= Martha Shelley =

American lesbian feminist activist

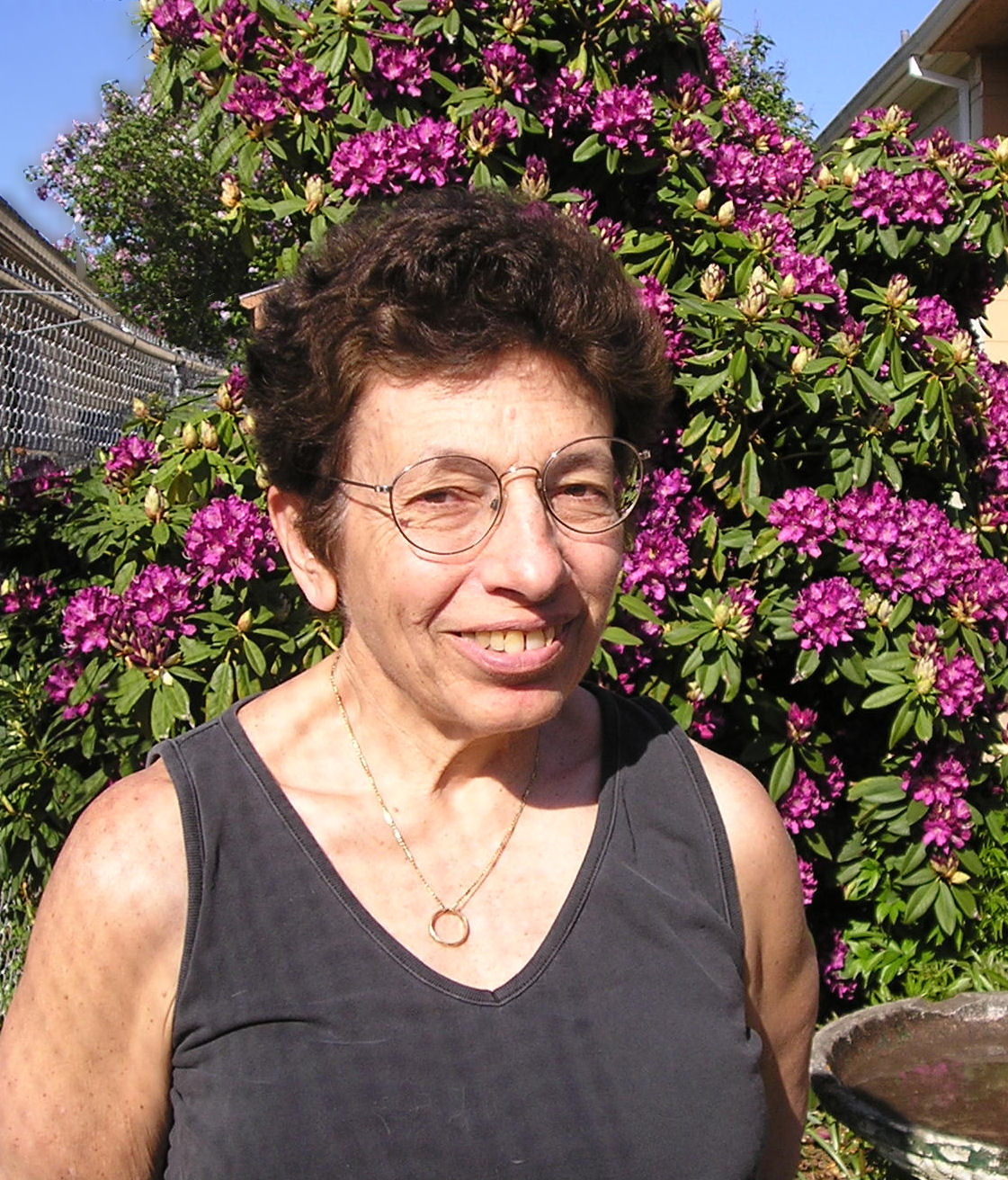
- Born: Martha Altman; December 27, 1943 (age 82); Brooklyn, New York City, U.S.
- Education: Bronx High School of Science; City College of New York
- Occupations: Activist, writer, poet
- Website: ebisupublications.com

Martha Shelley (born December 27, 1943) is an American activist, writer, and poet best known for her involvement in lesbian feminist activism.

== Life and early work ==
Martha Altman was born on December 27, 1943, in Brooklyn, New York, to parents of Russian-Polish Jewish descent. In 1960, she attended her first women's judo classes in New York City, trying to meet lesbian women. Two years later, at age 19, she moved out of her parents' home to a hotel and went to lesbian bars, where she "was miserable". She did not find herself fitting in to the roles of "butch" or "femme", common lesbian gender roles during this period.

During the 1960s, she was exposed to Betty Friedan's famous work, The Feminine Mystique, a text which inspired many feminists. She was also involved in a group based on the work of Harry Stack Sullivan which led to her first Anti-Vietnam War movement protest.

In 1965, she graduated from City College. In November 1967 she went to her first meeting of the New York City chapter of the Daughters of Bilitis (DOB), of which she later became president, despite her feelings of resistance to events like the "Annual Reminder" held by the organization.

Due to FBI surveillance, members of the DOB were encouraged to take aliases, and Altman took Shelley as a surname. While working as a secretary in the office of fundraising for Barnard College, she joined the Student Homophile League and worked with bisexual activist Stephen Donaldson, who she was also dating at the time. Shelley has described the affair as causing a scandal, stating, "We used to walk into these meetings arm in arm... because the two of us were so blatant and out there in public being pro gay, they certainly couldn't afford to throw us out."

In approximately 1969, the first major essay of Shelley's appears in the newsletter Liberation News Service: "Stepin' Fetchit Woman". This same essay later appeared in other publications under alternate titles including "Women of Lesbos" and "Notes of a Radical Lesbian"; it was called "Notes of a Radical Lesbian" in Sisterhood Is Powerful: An Anthology of Writings From The Women's Liberation Movement. Shelley states that she did not choose the title under which it first appeared.

In 2023, she published a memoir, We Set the Night on Fire: Igniting the Gay Revolution.

== Gay Liberation Front ==
While in a leadership role with the Daughters of Bilitis (DOB), Shelley sometimes provided tours to women who were in New York City to learn about how to make their own chapter of the organization. While giving one of these tours to women from Boston the night of the Stonewall riots, Shelley and her visitors walked past the beginnings of the riots outside of the Stonewall Inn. Shelley dismissed them as anti-war protests initially, but was later informed about the actual cause. Activist Mark Segal recounts that Shelley and Marty Robinson stood and made speeches from the front door of the Stonewall on June 29, 1969, the second night of the riot. Recognizing the significance of the event and being politically aware, Shelley proposed a protest march and, as a result, DOB and Mattachine sponsored a demonstration. With time, it became clear to those involved that Shelley and others desired a new organization to better serve their political goals; she was one of the twenty or so women and men who formed the Gay Liberation Front after Stonewall and was outspoken in many of their confrontations. Over time, the Gay Liberation Front's name was used in similar organizations but without any inherent direct connection to Shelley or other organizers in New York City at this time.

Shelley also wrote for Come Out!, the New York City Gay Liberation Front's newsletter, and helped get the issues printed. The newsletter published essays, reports, art, and poetry of submitters and members of the organization. It ran, however inconsistently, for three years. Shelley's work appears in all eight issues of the newsletter, with a variety of genres, including essays on the movements she was participating in, reports on the Gay Liberation Front in other cities and related organizations in New York City, and some of her poetry. Many of her essays, including “More Radical Than Thou” and “Subversion in the Women’s Movement - What is to be Done?” involve critiquing the competitive and cutthroat nature of the women's movement, gay liberation movement, and other adjacent movements. Come Out! is one of the places in which Shelley was first published, providing insight into her developing political ideology as well as the events around her.

The Gay Liberation Front allied itself with other movements going on at the time, including black liberation and women's liberation. For some, this unity was not desirable, and the Gay Activists Alliance (GAA) formed as a splinter group from GLF, and sought to focus more exclusively on gay rights. In addition to GAA, members of GLF also formed subgroups—cells—with different goals and purposes. One of the groups that formed primarily out of GLF women was Lavender Menace, named after the comment made by Betty Friedan (then president of NOW) regarding lesbians as a "lavender menace" in the feminist movement. Lavender Menace was later renamed Radicalesbians.

== Rat Subterranean News ==
Shelley was part of the women's collective that took over Rat Subterranean News in February 1970. As a collective, they published a feminist issue of the newspaper and then did not give it back to the male editors. Shelley was invited to take part in the collective as a representative of radical lesbian organizing.

== Feminism ==
In 1970, Lavender Menace, later Radicalesbians, organized the Lavender Menace zap of the Second Congress to Unite Women. Shelley played an instrumental role in the zap itself, and some have claimed she assisted in the writing of the Radicalesbians manifesto, "The Woman-Identified Woman", which introduced "women-identified" and "male-identified" terminology to the lesbian feminist discourse community. Later that same year, Shelley wrote "Subversion in the Women's Movement", which was published in both Come Out! and in off our backs, a feminist publication.

Beginning in 1972, Shelley produced the radio show Lesbian Nation on New York's WBAI radio station. The Library of Congress claims Lesbian Nation to be, most likely, the first lesbian radio show.

She contributed the pieces "Notes of a Radical Lesbian" and "Terror" to the 1970 anthology Sisterhood is Powerful: An Anthology of Writings From The Women's Liberation Movement, edited by Robin Morgan.

After moving to Oakland, California in October 1974, she was involved with the Women's Press Collective where she worked with Judy Grahn to produce Crossing the DMZ, In Other Words, Lesbians Speak Out and other books. Her poetry has appeared in Ms. magazine, Sunbury, The Bright Medusa, We Become New and other periodicals. Shelley appeared in the 2010 documentary Stonewall Uprising, an episode of the American Experience series.

== Activism and political views ==
External videos
- “American Experience; Stonewall Uprising; Interview with Martha Shelley, 2 of 2.” 2011-00-00. WGBH, American Archive of Public Broadcasting (WGBH and the Library of Congress), Boston, MA and Washington, DC

Despite being involved with lesbian feminism, Shelley does not describe herself as a lesbian separatist: though she liked the idea of lesbian-only spaces, she has said that the splitting of gay liberation into splinter groups weakened the movement as a whole. She also was allied to many other left-wing causes of the 1960s and 1970s, such as the pro-choice movement, and civil rights groups such as the Black Panthers and Young Lords, and has described herself as a socialist. Shelley was also a strong critic of the prevailing psychiatric views of homosexuality in the 1960s and argued that the stigmatization of homosexuality as a mental illness was a major contributing factor to psychological issues within the gay and lesbian community.

== Works and publications ==
=== Articles ===
==== In Come Out! ====
- "Stepin' Fetchit Woman" (Vol. 1, No. 1)
- “More Radical Than Thou” (Vol. 1, No. 2)
- “The Young Lords” (Vol. 1, No. 3)
- “Gay Youth Liberation” (Vol. 1, No. 4)
- “Gays Riot Again! Remember Stonewall!” (Vol. 1, No. 5)
- “Let a Hundred Flowers Bloom” (Vol. 1, No. 5) - Co-authored by Bernard Lewis
- "Subversion in the Women’s Movement: What is to be Done?” (Vol. 1, Issue 7)
- “Power… and the People!” (Vol. 2, No. 7b)

==== Other works ====
- "Notes of a Radical Lesbian" in Sisterhood is Powerful: An Anthology from the Women's Liberation Movement. Vintage. 1970. ISBN 9780394705392.
- "Gay is Good" in Out of the Closets: Voices of Gay Liberation. Douglas Books. 1972. ISBN 0-88209-002-X.
- "Our Passion Shook the World" in Smash the Church, Smash the State: The Early Years of Gay Liberation. City Lights Books. 2009. ISBN 9780872864979.

=== Books ===
- Crossing the DMZ. Women's Press Collective. 1974.
- Lovers and mothers. Sefir. 1981.
- Haggadah: A Celebration of Freedom. Aunt Lute Books. 1997. ISBN 1-879960-53-2.
- The Throne in the Heart of the Sea. Ebisu. 2011. ISBN 978-1-892076-83-0.
- The Stars in their Courses. Ebisu. 2014. ISBN 978-0692206171.
- A Meteor Shower. Ebisu. 2019. ISBN 978-0-578-50061-4.
- Released From the Wheel. Ebisu. 2021. ISBN 978-0-578-79959-9.
- We Set The Night On Fire: Igniting The Gay Revolution. 2023. ISBN 9781641609418

=== Short stories ===
- "Her wild barbarian heart" in Finding courage: writings by women. Crossing Press. 1989. ISBN 0-89594-378-6.
- "In that number". Common Lives/Lesbian Lives (30). 1989. ISSN 0891-6969.
- "Walking the rim" in Word of mouth : 150 short-short stories by 90 women writers. Crossing Press. 1990. ISBN 0-89594-395-6.
- "The cart o'tea belove" in Speaking for ourselves : short stories by Jewish Lesbians. Crossing Press. 1990. ISBN 9780895944283.

=== Poetry in anthology ===
- We become new : poems by contemporary women. Bantam. 1975.
- The Lesbian reader. Barn Owl. 1975. ISBN 0-9609626-0-3.
- The women's Seder sourcebook : rituals and readings for use at the Passover Seder. Jewish Lights. 2006. ISBN 978-1-58023-232-6.

== See also ==
- Karla Jay
- Susan Brownmiller
- Susan Simensky Bietila
- Anti-rape movement
- Gay Liberation Front
- Jewish Feminism
- Lavender Menace
- Lesbian feminism
- Radicalesbians
- Second-wave feminism
- The Woman-Identified Woman
