= Feminist separatism =

Theory of women's separation from men

Feminist separatism or separatist feminism is the theory that feminist opposition to patriarchy can be achieved through women's sex segregation from men. Much of the theorising is based on lesbian feminism.

Author Marilyn Frye describes feminist separatism as "separation of various sorts or modes from men and from institutions, relationships, roles and activities that are male-defined, male-dominated, and operating for the benefit of males and the maintenance of male privilege – this separation being initiated or maintained, at will, by women."

== Origins ==
Cultural critic Alice Echols describes the emergence of a lesbian separatist movement as a response to homophobic sentiments expressed by feminist organizations like the National Organization for Women. Echols argued that "the introduction of (homo)sex troubled many heterosexual feminists who had found in the women's movement a welcome respite from sexuality." Thus, Echols considered separatism as a lesbian strategy to untie lesbianism from sex so heterosexual women in the feminist movement felt more comfortable.

Cell 16, which was founded in 1968 by Roxanne Dunbar, has been cited as the first organization to advance the concept of separatist feminism. Echols argued that Cell 16 helped establish the theoretical foundations of lesbian separatism, and is an example of heterosexual feminist separatism, as the group never advocated lesbianism as a political strategy.

In No More Fun and Games, Cell 16's radical feminist periodical, members Roxanne Dunbar and Lisa Leghorn advised women to "separate from men who are not consciously working for female liberation." They advised women to have periods of celibacy (rather than lesbian relationships) which they considered to be "nothing more than a personal solution".

== Meaning and purpose ==
Proponents of feminist separatism have varied opinions on the meaning of feminist and lesbian separatism; major debates include the degree to which women should separate from men, whether it is a strict ideology or a strategy, and how it works to benefit women.

=== General feminist separatism ===
In a tract on socialist feminism published in 1972, the Hyde Park Chapter of the Chicago Women's Liberation Union differentiated between separatism as an "ideological position" and as a "tactical position". In the same document, they further distinguished between separatism as "personal practice" and as "political position".

In lesbian feminist Marilyn Frye's (1978) essay Notes on Separatism and Power she posits female separatism as a strategy practiced by all women, at some point, and present in many feminist projects (one might cite women's refuges, electoral quotas or Women's Studies programmes). She argues that it is only when women practice it self-consciously as separation from men, that it is treated with controversy (or as she suggests, hysteria). Male separatism on the other hand (one might consider gentleman's clubs, labor unions, sports teams, the military, and more arguably decision-making positions in general) is seen as quite a normal, even expedient phenomenon, while it is mostly not practiced self-consciously.

Some feminist separatists believe that men cannot make positive contributions to the feminist movement and that even well-intentioned men replicate the dynamics of patriarchy.

=== Lesbian separatism ===
Separatist lesbianism is a type of feminist separatism specific to lesbians.

Separatism has been considered by lesbians as both a temporary strategy and as a lifelong practice.

Charlotte Bunch, an early member of The Furies Collective, viewed separatism as a strategy, a "first step" period, or temporary withdrawal from mainstream activism to accomplish specific goals or enhance personal growth. In addition to advocating withdrawal from working, personal or casual relationships with men, The Furies Collective recommended that lesbian separatists relate "only (with) women who cut their ties to male privilege" and suggest that "as long as women still benefit from heterosexuality, receive its privileges and security, they will at some point have to betray their sisters, especially Lesbian sisters who do not receive those benefits." This was part of a larger idea that Bunch articulated in Learning from Lesbian Separatism (1976), that "in a male-supremacist society, heterosexuality is a political institution," and the practice of separatism is a way to escape its domination.

In her 1988 book, Lesbian Ethics: Toward New Value, lesbian philosopher Sarah Hoagland alludes to lesbian separatism's potential to encourage lesbians to develop healthy community ethics based on shared values. Hoagland articulates a distinction (originally noted by lesbian separatist author and anthologist, Julia Penelope) between a lesbian subculture and a lesbian community; membership in the subculture being "defined in negative terms by an external, hostile culture", and membership in the community being based on "the values we believe we can enact here".

Bette Tallen believes that lesbian separatism, unlike some other separatist movements, is "not about the establishment of an independent state, it is about the development of an autonomous self-identity and the creation of a strong solid lesbian community".

Lesbian historian Lillian Faderman describes the separatist impulses of lesbian feminism which created culture and cultural artifacts as "giving love between women greater visibility" in broader culture. Faderman also believes that lesbian feminists who acted to create separatist institutions did so to "bring their ideals about integrity, nurturing the needy, self-determination and equality of labor and rewards into all aspects of institution-building and economics".

In a United States context, the practice of lesbian separatism sometimes incorporates concepts related to queer nationalism and political lesbianism. Some individuals who identify as lesbian separatists are also associated with the practice of Dianic paganism.

=== Radical lesbianism ===
The term 'radical lesbianism' can be seen as both synonymous with and differentiated from lesbian separatism.

Radical lesbianism, amongst other similar movements, represents a rupture with the broader feminist movements. They offer an attempt by some feminists and lesbians to try to reconcile what they see as inherent conflicts with the stated goals of feminism. Many of these conflicts and ruptures are a result of issues arising from broader and nationally specifically cultural narratives around women. Some of them are created independently in response to these needs, while others draw inspiration from radical movements in other countries. This results in no single history of radical lesbianism, but of separate national struggles.

Internationally, radical lesbians often took advantage of convergent international spaces to create their own events to increase the visibility of lesbianism. Examples of this include the 1994 lesbian march in New York on the 25th anniversary of Stonewall, the 1995 Beijing hosted World Women's Conference, and the event held during the 1997 Amsterdam hosted Gay Games.

==== United States ====
In the United States, the movement started in 1970, when seven women (including lesbian activist Del Martin) confronted the North Conference of Homophile Organizations about the relevance of the gay rights movement to the women within it. The delegates passed a resolution in favor of women's liberation, but Del Martin felt they had not done enough, and wrote "If That's All There Is", an influential 1970 essay in which she decried gay rights organizations as sexist. The Furies formed a commune in 1971 open to lesbians only, where they put out a monthly newspaper called The Furies. The Furies consisted of twelve women, aged eighteen to twenty-eight, all feminists, all lesbians, all white, with three children among them. These activities continued into the early part of the decade. Other well known lesbian separatists groups include The Gutter Dykes, The Gorgons, and The Radicalesbians.

==== French-speaking countries ====
In Francophone countries, the term radical lesbian movement is used instead of lesbian separatism. It is roughly analogous to English-language lesbian separatism. Inspired by the writings of philosopher Monique Wittig, the movement originated in France in the early 1980s, spreading soon after to the Canadian province of Quebec. Wittig, referencing the ideas of Simone de Beauvoir, challenges concepts of biological determinism, arguing that those in power construct sex difference and race difference for the purpose of masking conflicts of interest and maintaining domination. She and her allies saw heterosociality as well as heterosexuality as aspects of hetero-power, strongly to be resisted.

==== Latin America ====
Radical lesbianism developed in Latin America during the 1970s. Like other parts of the movement, it came in response to specific national conditions. Radical lesbianism began to develop in Mexico in 1977, led by the group Mujeres guerreras que abren caminos y esparcen flores (Oikabeth). The movement arose in Chile in 1984 in response to national conditions resulting from the dictatorship. Costa Rica developed a radical lesbianism movement in 1986. During the 1980s and 1990s, life for lesbians in Latin America was difficult because of lesbophobic repression across the region. Consequently, the communities in Mexico, Costa Rica, Puerto Rico, Argentina and Brazil began working more closely together on shared goals.

== Culture and community ==
Lesbian and feminist separatism have inspired the creation of art and culture reflective of its visions of female-centered societies. An important and sustaining aspect of lesbian separatism was the building of alternative community through "creating organizations, institutions and social spaces ... women's bookstores, restaurants, publishing collectives, and softball leagues fostered a flourishing lesbian culture."

=== Writing ===
During the second-wave of feminism, the women in print movement aimed to create autonomous communications networks of feminist periodicals, presses, feminist bookstores, and information economies created by and for women. Some designated their periodicals and books "for women only", or "for lesbians only," and the first Women in Print Conference in 1976 asked attendees to keep the event secret. There were persistent debates about whether or how these separatist publishing enterprises should collaborate with or do business with men. Some feminist presses like Kitchen Table: Women of Color Press worked with men for pragmatic or ideological reasons.

==== Fiction ====
- Charlotte Perkins Gilman's feminist novel Herland (1915)
- Joanna Russ's The Female Man (1975)
- Nicola Griffith's Ammonite (1993)
- The Wanderground (Persephone Press, 1978), is a separatist utopian novel written from author Sally Miller Gearhart's personal experience in rural lesbian-separatist collectives.

==== Non-fiction ====
- Wild Mares: My Lesbian Back-to-the-Land Life (University of Minnesota Press, 2018) documents author Dianna Hunter's experiences in a lesbian separatist collective.
- Lesbian Nation: The Feminist Solution (Simon & Schuster, 1973) is a collection of essays written by Jill Johnston, that were originally printed in The Village Voice, where Johnston discusses elements of breaking off from the male-dominated institutions.
- For Lesbians Only: A Separatist Anthology (Onlywomen Press, 1988), edited by Julia Penelope and Sarah Lucia Hoagland, is a collection of writings on lesbian separatism.

==== Periodicals ====
Notable US lesbian separatist periodicals include:

- Common Lives/Lesbian Lives (Iowa, 1980–1996)
- Lesbian Connection (Michigan, 1974–present)
- Sinister Wisdom (California, 1976–present)
- Lesbian Tide (California, 1971–1980)
- WomanSpirit (Oregon, 1974–1984)
- Conditions (New York, 1976–1990)
- Azalea: A Magazine by Third World Lesbians (New York, 1971–1980).

Other international examples are:

- The London lesbian magazine Gossip: A Journal of Lesbian Feminist Ethics
- Lesbian Feminist Circle, a lesbian only journal collectively produced in Wellington, New Zealand
- The Australian periodical Sage: The Separatist Age
- Amazones d'Hier, Lesbiennes d'Aujourd'hui, produced for lesbians only in Montreal, Quebec
- The Killer Dyke a magazine by the "Flippies" (Feminist Lesbian Intergalactic Party), based in Chicago
- The Furies was an American newspaper by The Furies Collective which intended to give a voice to lesbian separatism, and ran from January 1972 until mid-1973.

=== Music ===
The early 1970s was an active period in women's music, a genre mostly originated and supported by lesbian separatists. Maxine Feldman's Angry Atthis and Alix Dobkin's Lavender Jane Loves Women were two early examples of this phenomenon.

The Michigan Womyn's Music Festival, or "Michfest", was a yearly music festival that took place every summer until 2015. Established in 1976, it actively supported the need for women to be separated at times from the "politics, institution, and culture of men. Michfest offered women not only the chance to 'live' feminism, but, as the quotes above testify, also acted as a way of educating women about feminist forms, in ways that can challenge the vilification of 'radical lesbian separatism'." Despite this claim to creating a community centered on women's liberation, Michfest implemented policies excluding attendees if they did not live up to their definition of a "womyn-born womyn". As a protest and alternative gathering, trans-inclusive activists founded Camp Trans.

Olivia Records was a separatist business in Los Angeles that produced women's music and concerts. Olivia Records was founded in 1973 by Jennifer Woodhul, Lee Schwing, Ginny Berson, and Helaine Harris and was originally located in Washington, D.C. Olivia Records sold nearly 2 million copies of albums with women performers and artists that were marketed to women. The record company eventually shifted from music to travel, and is now a lesbian travel company called Olivia.

=== Community projects ===
Many lesbian separatists bought land so they could live separately from men and heterosexual women. Lesbian separatism provided opportunities to "live their lives apart from ...mainstream society". In the 1970s, "significant numbers of lesbian feminists moved to rural communities."One of these lesbians, Joyce Cheney, interviewed rural feminist separatists and lesbian separatists living in intentional community, land trusts and land co-ops. The result was her book, Lesbian Land (1976). Cheney describes the reason for many of these separatists' move to lesbian land as a "spatial strategy of distancing ... from mainstream society". Another example is Lambda Award-winning author Elana Dykewomon spent the majority of her adult life in female-only communities, some of which she helped organise.

Womyn's land has been used in America to describe communities of lesbian separatists, normally living on a separate plot of land. Some of these communities have practiced the idea of ecofeminism, which is the connection between the oppression of women and the oppression of nature by men. Access to temporary free land was often found through women's music festivals, where lesbians would network and strategized their plans for lesbian land.

== Reception ==
In 1983, anarchist Bob Black wrote: "Separatism may be absurd as a social program and riddled with inconsistencies. But semi-isolation makes it easier to indoctrinate neophytes and shut out adverse evidence and argument, an insight radical feminists share with Moonies, Hare Krishna, and other cultists".

While advocating a broadly separatist policy, feminist Sonia Johnson points out that feminist separatism risks defining itself by what it separates itself from, i.e. men.

=== Issues of race ===
Lesbian poet Jewelle Gomez refers to her intertwined history with black men and heterosexual women in her essay Out of the Past and explains that "to break away from those who've been part of our survival is a leap that many women of color could never make".

In a 1982 published conversation about black feminism and lesbian activism with her sister Beverly Smith, Barbara Smith, co-author of the Combahee River Collective Statement, expressed concerns that "to the extent that lesbians of color must struggle simultaneously against the racism of white women (as against sexism), separatism impedes the building of alliances with men of color". Smith writes that race places lesbians of color in a different relation to men as white lesbians as "white women with class privilege don't share oppression with white men. They're in a critical and antagonistic position whereas Black women and other women of color definitely share oppressed situations with men of their race". Smith makes a distinction between the theory of separatism and the practice of separatism, stating that it is the way separatism has been practiced which has led to "an isolated, single-issued understanding and practice of politics, which ignores the range of oppressions that women experience".

== See also ==
- Default judgment
- Gatekeeper
- Flanderization
- Herd mentality
- Lesbian erasure
- Lysistrata
- Political lesbianism
- Radical feminism
- Riot grrrl
- Safe space
- Single-gender world
- TERF
- Who Needs Feminism
- YesAllWomen
- Misandry
