= The Furies Collective =

Defunct Lesbian commune in Washington, D.C.

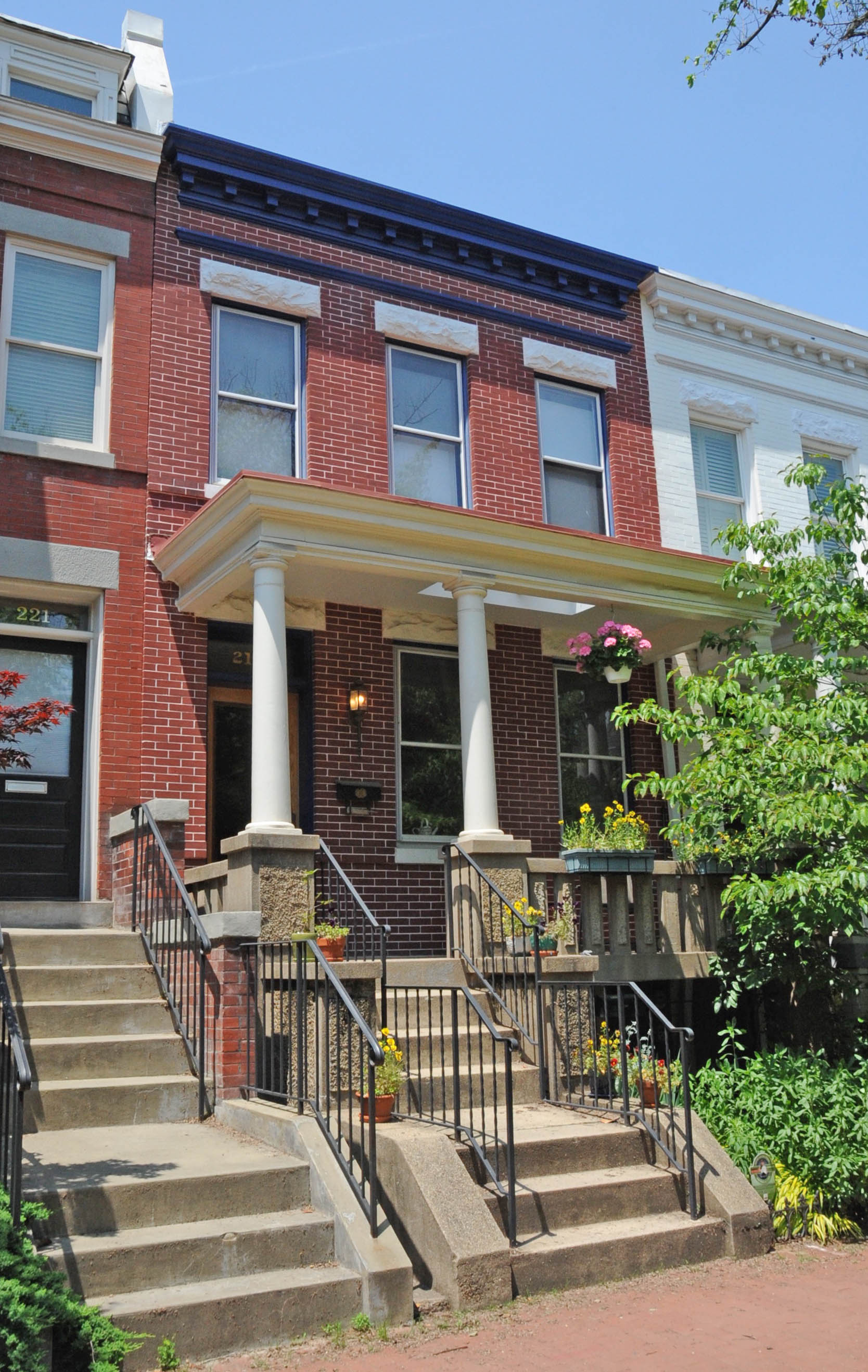
House at 219 11th St., SE, now a National Historic Landmark

The Furies Collective was a short-lived commune of twelve young lesbian separatists in Washington, D.C., U.S. in 1971 and 1972. They viewed lesbianism as more political than sexual, and declared heterosexual women to be an obstacle to the world revolution they sought. Their theories are still acknowledged among feminist groups.

== History and mission ==
The Furies Collective house is a row house that is a two-story early 20th century brick dwelling which addressed at 219 11th St SE in Washington, D.C., and was, along with the Gay Liberation House and the Skyline Collective, among Washington, D.C.'s best known communal living groups in the early 1970s. They were an example of lesbian feminism which emerged during the women's movement of the late 1960s and 1970s. The collective's decision to separate from the broader feminist movement (which they felt was dominated by white, heterosexual women) was partly motivated by a desire for a more revolutionary, non-compromising stance on issues of women’s liberation, which would resonate well with the collective’s specific aims.The twelve women in the collective were aged eighteen to twenty-eight, all feminists, lesbian, and white with three children among them. They shared chores and clothes, held some of their money in common, and slept on mattresses on a common floor.

All of the founding members had extensive organizing and activist experience before they started The Furies. In particular, many were members of the women's movement, specifically the DCWLM (D.C. Women's Liberation Movement). The group was modeled after other revolutionary movements such as the Black Panther Party and the Weathermen. In this sense, they aimed to promote a global revolution through the establishment of small radical groups. They wanted to abolish patriarchy, white supremacy, and imperialism. They were particularly devoted to developing and exploring feminist theory, especially the way in which sexual identity is socially constructed.

As part of their mission, they started a school to teach women auto and home repair so they would not be dependent on men. Members called for other feminists to create more communes wherein women could nurture their relationships with one another away from male chauvinism. Men as well as heterosexual woman were seen as impediments to progress.

Most of the members of the collective wrote for their newspaper, The Furies. From January 1972 until mid-1973, the paper was published and distributed nationally. In the first issue in January 1972, contributor Ginny Berson stated her view that:

"... Sexism is the root of all other oppressions, and Lesbian and woman oppression will not end by smashing capitalism, racism, and imperialism. Lesbianism is not a matter of sexual preference, but rather one of political choice which every woman must make if she is to become woman-identified and thereby end male supremacy."

The Furies received criticism from other feminist publications for using elitist, male-determined standards of language and theory. The criticism included focusing on theory because it was a tool used and created by men which ultimately perpetuates male power. Additionally, critics argued that The Furies publishing the names of authors undermines the collective nature of knowledge in the movement and upholds hierarchical power structures that parallel those in society. The members of the collective included little coverage of this criticism in their publication. This resistance to criticism and devotion to theory above personal experience alienated many women and hindered the Furies' ability to expand their membership in order to achieve their mass movement goals.

The group promoted a model of lesbianism for all members of the women's movement, an alternative identity which combined sexual orientation, gender identity, and radical philosophy. For member Charlotte Bunch, to be a lesbian "is to love oneself, woman, in a culture that denigrates and despises women." Berson also stated "Lesbians must become feminists and fight against woman oppression, just as feminists must become Lesbians if they hope to end male supremacy."

== Members ==
According to Rita Mae Brown in Rita Will, the members of the collective were "Rita Mae Brown, Charlotte Bunch, Tasha Byrd [sic], Ginny Berson, Sharon Deevey, Susan Hathaway, Lee Schwin [sic], Helaine Harris, Coletta Reid, Jennifer Woodull [sic], Nancy Myron and Joan E. Biren (J.E.B.)" Guest writers like DC poet Susan Baker were also involved. The names marked "[sic]" are actually Tasha Petersen or Peterson, Lee Schwing, and Jennifer Woodul.

== Legacy ==
The collective did not last long but its influence was felt beyond the group's end. Theoretical contributions to the women's movement included connecting the enforcement of heterosexuality with women's oppression, understanding sexual orientation as culturally, rather than biologically, constructed, and the legitimacy of lesbian feminism within the women's movement. Future feminist groups across the country cited the importance of the Furies' theoretical developments of feminism to their own organizing efforts. Former members of the collective went on to other organizing and activist positions, especially in media and publishing.

The first two members asked to leave were Joan E. Biren and Sharon Deevey, followed shortly thereafter by Rita Mae Brown. The newsletter survived the disbanding of the collective in the spring of 1972 by about a year.

Olivia Records was founded in 1973 by former group members and the Radicalesbians.

== Recognition ==
On January 28, 2016, the house at 219 11th St. SE which was home to the Furies Collective was named as the first lesbian-related historic landmark in Washington, D.C., when it was unanimously voted into the D.C. Inventory of Historic Sites. On May 2, 2016, Patrick W. Andues signed as keeper and the Furies Collective house was deemed private property. The house also became the first lesbian site on the National Register of Historic Places that day. It was designated a National Historic Landmark in 2024.

In February 2025, journalist Mady Castigan noted that the Furies Collective page on the National Park Service website had references to transgender people removed.
