= Elana Dykewomon =

American activist and author (1949–2022)

- Born: Elana Michelle Nachman; October 11, 1949; New York City, U.S.
- Died: August 7, 2022 (aged 72); Oakland, California, U.S.
- Education: California Institute of the Arts (BFA); San Francisco State University (MFA)
- Occupations: Author; professor; activist; editor
- Years active: 1974–2022
- Employer: San Francisco State University
- Known for: Lesbian feminist activism
- Spouse: Susan Levinkind (died 2016)
- Website: web.archive.org/web/20230101192548/http://www.dykewomon.org/home.html

Elana Dykewomon (née Nachman; October 11, 1949 – August 7, 2022) was an American lesbian activist, author, editor, and teacher. She was a recipient of the Lambda Literary Award for the Lesbian Fiction category.

== Early life and education ==
Dykewomon was born Elana Michelle Nachman in Manhattan to middle class Jewish parents; her mother was a researcher and librarian, and her father was a lawyer. She was raised in a Zionist household, and her father fought in Israel's War of Independence. She and her family moved from Long Island, New York to Puerto Rico when she was eight.

Dykewomon had a difficult childhood as she struggled with her sexuality and frequently fought with her parents. She recalled being molested by a worker at the local San Juan hotel. At around 11 or 12, she attempted suicide and was consequently sent to a residential center in New York for treatment then later to Johns Hopkins Hospital in Baltimore because of another attempt. In her later teen years, she lived in a halfway house and attended various boarding schools, including Windsor Mountain School.

She studied fine art at Reed College in Portland, Oregon, earned a Bachelor of Fine Arts in creative writing from the California Institute of Arts in 1971, and her Master of Fine Arts from San Francisco State University in 1997.

== Books ==
External videos
- Interviews and readings by Elana Dykewomon
- “Elana Dykewomon (1 of 1) -- Fat Liberation People's History”, August 3, 2022, A Fat Liberation Archive
- “Elana Dykewomon - SAS Invades Bookstream", April 17, 2020, Tubby & Coo's Mid-City Book Shop

In 1974, Dykewomon published her first novel, Riverfinger Women, with lesbian feminist publisher Daughters, Inc. under her birth name Elana Nachman.

Her second book, They Will Know Me By My Teeth, released in 1976, was published under the name Elana Dykewoman, "at once an expression of her strong commitment to the lesbian community and a way to keep herself 'honest,' since anyone reading the book would know the author was a lesbian." She also considered her name change an attempt to distance herself from the Nachman line of rabbis, and traditional literary culture, noting that "if I called myself Dykewomon, I would never get reviewed in the New York Times".

Fragments From Lesbos, printed in 1981 "for lesbians only," was published under the author's current last name, "Dykewomon," in order "to avoid etymological connection with men."

In the 1989 anthology of writing by Jewish women, The Tribe of Dina, Dykewomon describes herself as "a Lesbian Separatist, descendant of the Baal Shem Tov, typesetter, ...poet".

In 1997, Dykewomon published Beyond the Pale: A Novel, which followed two Jewish lesbians' migration from Russia to the Lower East Side in New York. The historical fiction novel included a depiction of the Triangle Shirtwaist Factory fire, as well as Russian pogroms, the U.S. suffrage movement, and midwifery practices in the early 20th century. Beyond the Pale was republished in 2013, and considered a classic of the lesbian fiction genre. The novel served as Dykewomon's master's thesis at San Francisco State University, requiring her to study Yiddish, the Torah, and the Talmud. Maxine Chernoff served as her thesis advisor.

== Periodicals ==
From 1987 to 1995, Dykewomon edited Sinister Wisdom, an international lesbian feminist journal of literature, art and politics, as well as contributing articles herself. She also contributed regularly to several other lesbian periodicals, including Common Lives/Lesbian Lives. She was also a regular contributor to Bridges, a magazine of writing by Jewish women.

== Awards and achievements ==
In 1998, Beyond the Pale won the Lambda Literary Award for Lesbian Fiction and the Ferro-Grumley Award for lesbian fiction.

In 2004, Riverfinger Women was selected as #87 in The Publishing Triangle's list of 100 Best Lesbian and Gay Novels, by a panel of judges that included Dorothy Allison, Samuel R. Delany, Lillian Faderman, M.E. Kerr, Sarah Schulman, and Barbara Smith. In 2018, the Golden Crown Literary Society awarded Riverfinger Women with the Lee Lynch Classic Award because it is an "essential part of American literary history, LGBT literature, politics, and popular culture."

Dykewomon was awarded the Jim Duggins Outstanding Mid-Career Novelists' Prize by the Saints and Sinners Literary Festival in 2009.

== Personal life and death ==
After graduating from the California Institute of Art, Dykewomon moved to Northampton, Massachusetts, where she was involved with the Valley Women's Center and lesbian separatist projects. In Northampton, she helped found Megaera Press, a lesbian publishing house, as well as the Women's Film Coop.

In the 1970s, Dykewomon moved to Coos Bay, Oregon, before settling in Oakland, California in the 1980s. In Oakland, she worked as a typesetter and taught in the English and the Women and Gender Studies departments at her alma mater San Francisco State. Dykewomon was involved with the San Francisco Dyke March for over eight years.

She was married to Susan Levinkind from 1988 until her death from Lewy body dementia in 2016.

Dykewomon died of esophageal cancer at her home on August 7, 2022, aged 72, shortly before she was to view the Bay Area Playwrights Festival's live-streamed reading of How to Let Your Partner Die, a play she had written about Levenkind's illness and death.

== Works ==
=== Books ===
==== Novels ====
- Nachman, Elana (1974). Riverfinger Women. Plainfield, VT: Daughters, Inc.
- Dykewomon, Elana (1997). Beyond the Pale. Vancouver: Press Gang Publishers. ISBN 9780889740747.
- — (2009). Risk. Ann Arbor: Bywater Books. ISBN 9781932859690.

==== Poetry and short story collections ====
- Dykewoman, Elana (1976). They Will Know Me By My Teeth. Northampton, MA: Megaera Press. OCLC 897740442.
- Dykewomon, Elana (1981). Fragments from Lesbos. Langlois, OR: Diaspora Distribution. OCLC 31156287.
- — (1995). Nothing Will Be As Sweet As The Taste: Selected Poems 1974–1994. London: Onlywomen Press. ISBN 9780906500576.
- — (2003). Moon Creek Road. Duluth, Minn.: Spinsters Ink. ISBN 9781883523626.
- — (2015). What Can I Ask: New and Selected Poems 1975-2014. Berkeley, CA: Sinister Wisdom. ISBN 978-1-938334-15-3.

=== Other writings ===
Prose

- — (1983). "The Mezzuzah Maker". Common Lives/Lesbian Lives. 8.
- — (Fall 1985). "Staking Claims". Common Lives/Lesbian Lives. 17.
- — (1989). "Manna from Heaven". In Kaye/Kantrowitz, Melanie; Klepfisz, Irena (eds.). The Tribe of Dina: A Jewish Women's Anthology. Beacon Press. ISBN 0-8070-3605-6.
- — (1990). "My Grandmother's Plates". Speaking for Ourselves: Short Stories by Jewish Lesbians. Freedom, CA: Crossing Press. ISBN 978-0895944283.
- — (1998). "Knaydie and the Librarian". In Tulchinsky, Karen X. (ed.). Friday the Rabbi Wore Lace: Jewish Lesbian Erotica. Cleis Press. ISBN 9781573440417.
- — (1999). "Grace". In Krug, Andrea; Schadenberg, Dagmar (eds.). augenblicke. Berlin. ISBN 978-3930041190.
- — (2001). "Dinoflagellates". In Tulchinsky, Karen X. (ed.). Hot & Bothered 3: Short Short Fiction on Lesbian Desire. Arsenal Pulp Press. ISBN 9781551521022.
- — (2002). "The Body Politic: Meditations on Identity". In Anzaldúa, Gloria; Keating, Analouise (eds.). This Bridge We Call Home: Radical Visions for Transformation. New York: Routledge. pp. 450–457. ISBN 9781135351526.
- — (2003). "What Love Is". In Brown, Angela (ed.). Best Lesbian Love Stories 2003. Alyson Press. ISBN 978-1555837655.
- — (2007). "Seeking Welcome". In Forrest, Katherine V.; Buskirk, Jim Van (eds.). Love, Castro Street: Reflections of San Francisco. Alyson Press. ISBN 9781555839970.

Poetry

- "I had a dream..." and "Even My Eyes Became Mouths" in — (1990). McEwen, Christian (ed.). Naming the Waves: Contemporary Lesbian Poetry. Freedom, CA: Crossing Press. ISBN 9780895943712.
- — (1983). "learning to breathe". In Schoenfielder, Lisa; Wieser, Barb (eds.). Shadow on a Tightrope: Writings by Women on Fat Oppression. Iowa City: Aunt Lute Books. ISBN 9781879960244.
- "The Census Taker Interviews the 20th Century" and "The Vilde Chaya and Civilization" in — (1992). Bridges: A Journal for Jewish Feminists and Our Friends. Seattle, WA. 3 (1). ISSN 1046-8358
- "New England Cemetery" and "diving, i kiss" in — (1993). Penelope, Julia; Wolfe, Susan (eds.). Lesbian Culture: An Anthology. Freedom, CA: Crossing Press. ISBN 9780895945921.
- — (1994). "A Law of Physics". Bridges: A Journal for Jewish Feminists and Our Friends. ISSN 1046-8358.
- — (Summer 1994). "When to Answer". Zyzzyva. X (2). ISSN 8756-5633.
- Various in — (1999). Mohin, Lilian (ed.). Not for the Academy: Lesbian Poets. London: Onlywomen Press. ISBN 9780906500606.
- — (April 2000). "Butch resisting the pressure to change gender". Sojourner. Boston. ISSN 0191-8699.
- Foreword, "Yahrzeit," "Butch Breasts at Fifty," and "Should I Tell My Gynecologist" in Zeiser, Linda; Machado, Trena, eds. (2006). What I Want From You: Voices of East Bay Lesbian Poets. Pittsburgh, CA: Raw Art Press. ISBN 978-0972918558.
- — (2011). "An Eastern/Western Country Song". In Enszer, Julie R. (ed.). Milk and Honey: A Celebration of Jewish Lesbian Poetry. A Midsummer Night's Press. ISBN 978-0-9794208-8-7.
- — (Spring 2016). "Pauline Newman at 92". Calyx. 29 (1). ISSN 0147-1627.

==== Essays ====
- — (1983). "Traveling Fat". In Schoenfielder, Lisa; Wieser, Barb (eds.). Shadow on a Tightrope: Writings by Women on Fat Oppression. Iowa City: Aunt Lute Books. ISBN 9781879960244.
- — (1989). "The Fourth Daughter's Four Hundred Questions". In Beck, Evelyn Torton (ed.). Nice Jewish Girls: A Lesbian Anthology. Boston: Beacon Press. ISBN 978-0807079058.
- — (December 2001). Gartrell, Nanette; Rothblum, Ester (eds.). "Changing the World". Journal of Lesbian Studies. 5 (3). Harrington Park Press: 53–62. doi:10.1300/J155v05n03_06. PMID 24802823. S2CID 43796951.
- — (2002). Kinberg, Clare (ed.). "My Mother and the Wars". Bridges: A Journal for Jewish Feminists and Our Friends. 9 (2). Eugene, OR. ISSN 1046-8358.
- — (2005). "Lesbian Quarters: On Building Space, Identity, Institutional Memory and Resources". Journal of Lesbian Studies. 9 (1 & 2): 31–43. doi:10.1300/J155v09n01_03. PMID 19780262. S2CID 20380955.
- —; Rothblum, Esther (2009). "Are We Ready to Throw Our Weight Around?: Fat Women and Political Activism". In Rothblum, Esther; Solovay, Sondra (eds.). The Fat Studies Reader. NYU Press. ISBN 978-0-8147-7631-5.
- — (February 2010). "Who says we're extinct?". TRIVIA: Voices of Feminism. 10. ISSN 2166-9082.
- —; Felman, Jyl Lynn (Spring 2011). "Forward and Backward: Jewish Lesbian Writers". Bridges: A Journal for Jewish Feminists and Our Friends. 16 (1): 228–233. doi:10.2979/bridges.16.1.228. ISSN 1046-8358. S2CID 144172333.
- — (Spring 2011). "Walking on the Moon". TRIVIA: Voices of Feminism. 11. ISSN 2166-9082.
- — (2014). "Living "Anyway:" Stories of Access". Journal of Lesbian Studies. 18 (1): 21–30. doi:10.1080/10894160.2013.836432. PMID 24400626. S2CID 6600940.
- — (2014). "In Search of the Fabled Fat Woman". Fat Studies. 3 (1): 1–5. doi:10.1080/21604851.2013.770355. S2CID 191464696.
