= Joan E. Biren =

American feminist photographer (born 1944)

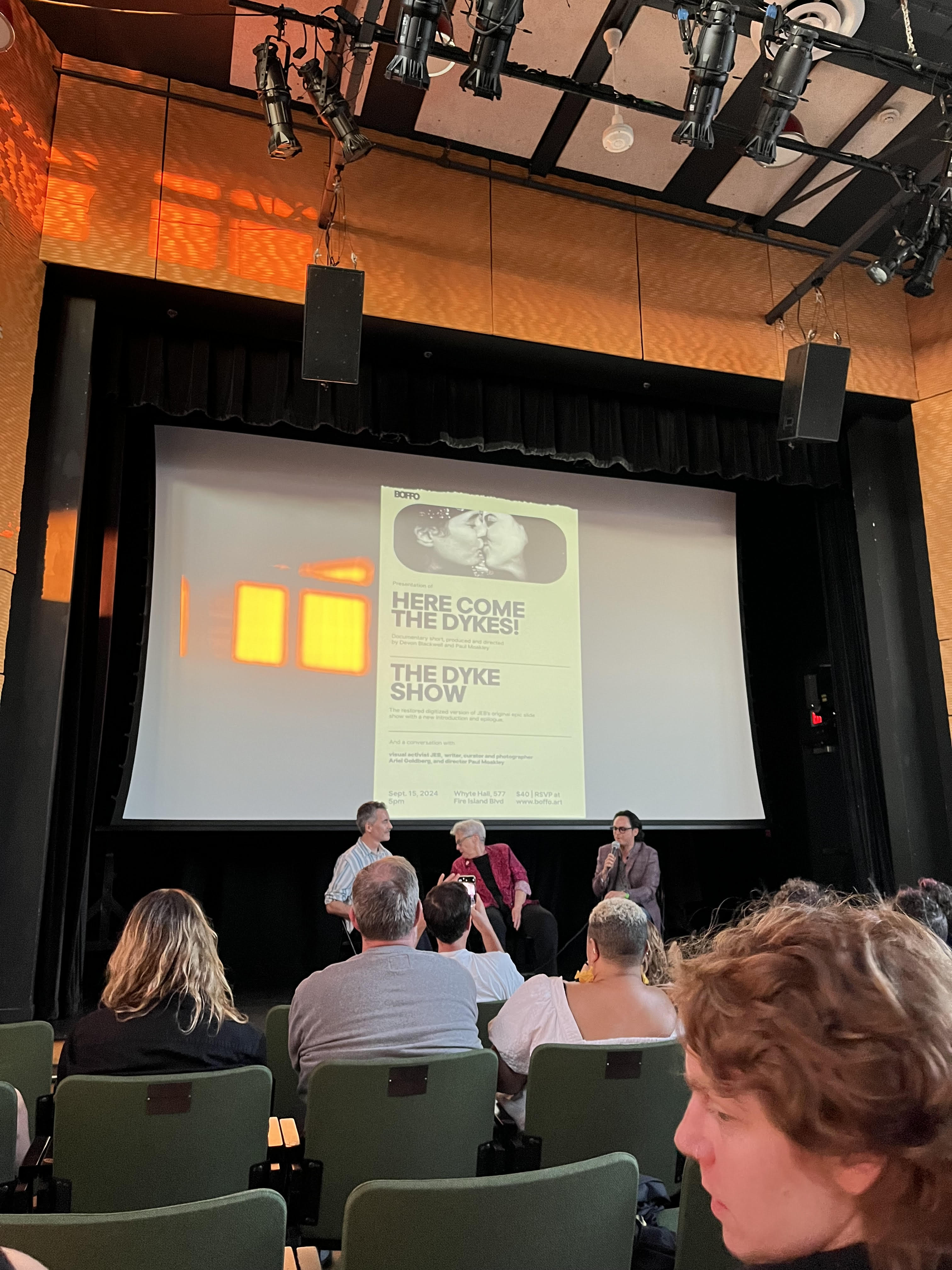
- J.E.B. (center) in September 2024
- Born: July 13, 1944 (age 82); Washington, D.C., United States
- Education: Mount Holyoke College; American University; Oxford University
- Occupations: Photographer, filmmaker, activist
- Organization: The Furies Collective
- Known for: "The Dyke Show"; Eye to Eye: Portraits of Lesbians

Joan E. Biren or JEB (born July 13, 1944) is an American feminist photographer and film-maker, who dramatizes the lives of LGBTQ people in contexts that range from healthcare and hurricane relief to women's music and anti-racism. For portraits, she encourages sitters to act as her "muse", rather than her "subject". Biren was a member of The Furies Collective, a short-lived but influential lesbian commune.

== Education ==
Biren attended Mount Holyoke College in South Hadley, Massachusetts, where she received her B.A. in political science in 1966. She received an M.A. in communications at American University in 1974. After three years of pursuing doctoral studies at Oxford University, Biren returned home to America. She worked at a camera store and small-town newspaper, teaching herself photography skills through a correspondence course.

== Career ==
=== The Furies Collective ===
In her early 20s, Biren and others, including Rita Mae Brown and Charlotte Bunch, formed The Furies Collective, a radical experiment in lesbian feminist separatist organizing. Though the collective lasted only about 18 months, it had a profound influence on lesbian thought through its newspaper, The Furies, and other publications.

=== Photography ===
It was in the collective that Biren began developing her skills in photography. In the 1970s, Biren toured the United States, photographing lesbians at women's events ranging from the Michigan Womyn's Music Festival, anti-Ku Klux Klan demonstrations, writing workshops, sporting events, lesbian-separatist communities, and pride parades. Her books Eye to Eye: Portraits of Lesbians (1979) and Making a Way: Lesbians Out Front (1987) brought visibility to lesbian lives. She has also photographed notable lesbians such as Kitty Tsui, Sarah Schulman, Shay Youngblood, Barbara Smith, Cherríe Moraga, and Hattie Gossett, as well as events like the Gay Games, the Seneca Women's Encampment for a Future of Peace and Justice, and Christopher Street Liberation Day.

Biren's first book, Eye to Eye: Portraits of Lesbians (1979), was considered a revolutionary work for its era. The book showcased Biren's collection of photographs that she took of lesbians from different backgrounds and ages in the United States living their daily lives. Photographs included lesbians in their homes embracing each other, raising a family together, and showing love. Alongside the photographs, Biren included their names and personal stories of their lives. Biren's vision for her book was to change the way society viewed lesbians and to allow lesbians to see themselves represented. The publication of her book allowed her to travel to bookstores and universities that requested Biren give presentations about her book and describe her writing and filming process as a lesbian feminist photographer. The book was republished in 2021 by Anthology Editions with additional essays from artist Tee Corinne, soccer player Lori Lindsey, and photographer Lola Flash.

After the publication of Eye to Eye in 1979, Biren developed a slideshow, "Lesbian Images in Photography, 1850 to the Present", also known as "The Dyke Show," intending to publicize the book, and toured the country presenting it to women-only audiences. The Dyke Show was a two and a half-hour presentation on female photographers who Biren theorized to be lesbians, including Clementina Hawarden, Frances Benjamin Jonhston, Alice Austen, and Berenice Abbott. The presentation also includes contemporary images from the gay liberation movement, erotica, and peer lesbian photographers such as Tee Corrine, Cathy Cade, Diana Davies, and Kay Tobin. Several images from the Dyke Show were sourced from Library of Congress collections, which Biren photographed surreptitiously in the bathrooms; the slideshow included sections on patterns and indicators of lesbianism in photography, hoping to increase visibility. For many years, Biren traveled the country presenting her multi-projector slideshows and running photography workshops.

Her mentors included Audre Lorde and Barbara Deming. In her photography, Biren tried to break away from the traditional power structures associated with photography. She preferred to use the term "muse" rather than "subject." She would also try to interact with her "muses" on equal terms, in what she has described as "lesbian semiotics," a concept further explored in her 1983 article "Lesbian Photography–Seeing Through Our Own Eyes" in Studies in Visual Communication. In an effort to ensure that affirming images and positive self-expression occurred outside of what she considered traditional patriarchal venues, Biren included her work in off our backs, the Washington Blade, Gay Community News, and on album and book covers. From Biren's oral history in The Rainbow History Project collection:

My thing was to take pictures of the people that other people weren't taking pictures of, to make visible what was invisible [...] I always try to present the entire diversity of our community.

=== Film ===
In the early 1990s, she moved from slideshows to filmmaking. Biren's films include No Secret Anymore: The Times of Del Martin and Phyllis Lyon; Removing the Barriers; Women Organize!; Solidarity, Not Charity; Lesbian Physicians on Practice, Patients and Power; and For Love and For Life: The 1987 March on Washington for Lesbian and Gay Rights.

Biren produced and wrote A Simple Matter of Justice, which documents the 1993 March on Washington for Lesbian, Gay and Bi Equal Rights and Liberation. The one-hour film received wide acclaim and was voted Best Video at the Reel Affirmations film festival. To produce this piece, Biren set up a live six-camera switch feed that simultaneously broadcast footage on jumbo screens located in the National Mall and around the world.

Biren's films have been shown on the Sundance Channel and public broadcasting stations. She is the president of Moonforce Media, a non-profit which produces and distributes films and videos that challenge people to work for social justice and awards the Tee A. Corinne Prize, an annual grant to lesbian media makers.

=== Later career and recognition ===
In 1995, Biren became an associate of the Women's Institute for Freedom of the Press, an American non-profit publishing organization that works to increase communication between women and connect the public with women-based media.

In 1997, George Washington University mounted a retrospective exhibit of Biren's work, Queerly Visible: 1971–1991, which later toured the country. In 2011, the Leslie-Lohman Museum of Art held a retrospective show, "Lesbians Seeing Lesbians: Building Community in Early Feminist Photography".

Biren received the Alice Austen Award in 2018 for the Advancement of Photography. In 2017, she received an honorary doctorate from her alma mater, Mount Holyoke College.

Biren's papers and visual materials are permanently archived at the Sophia Smith Collection at Smith College. Some of her work is held at the Library of Congress in Washington, D.C. In addition, George Washington University houses a collection of photographs used in Queerly Visible: 1971–1991.

== Bibliography ==
- Biren, Joan E. (1979). Eye to eye: portraits of lesbians : photographs. Glad Hag Books. ISBN 0960317600.
- Biren, Joan E. (1987). Making a way: lesbians out front. Glad Hag Books. ISBN 0960317619.
- Biren, Joan E. (1983). "Lesbian Photography – Seeing Through Our Own Eyes". Journal of Visual Communications. 9: 81–96.
- Deming, Barbara (1985). Biren, Joan E. (ed.). Prisons that could not hold. San Francisco: Spinsters Ink. ISBN 0933216157.
- Queerly visible, 1971–1991: the work of JEB (Joan E. Biren): a Washington, D.C. photographer. George Washington University. 1991.
- Biren, Joan E. (2021). Eye to Eye: Portraits of Lesbians. Brooklyn, NY: Anthology Editions. ISBN 978-1-944-86037-0.
- Biren, Joan E. (2018). "Resist and Renew". Feminist Studies. Vol. 44 Issue 3. p. 16. ISSN 0046-3663
