= Sisters for Homophile Equality =

Lesbian organisation in New Zealand

- Formation: 1973; 53 years ago
- Dissolved: 1977; 49 years ago
- Purpose: women's liberation, gay politics
- Region served: New Zealand

Sisters for Homophile Equality (SHE) was the first national lesbian organisation in New Zealand. They published The Circle, the first national lesbian magazine. Through this they were able to circulate overseas magazines and introduce New Zealanders to international ideas on lesbian feminism.

== History ==
SHE was founded in 1973 by six Christchurch women. The group was formed to include both women's liberation and gay politics, two groups which were felt to inadequately address the issues of lesbians. Facing exclusion from heterosexual feminists and sexism from gay men, lesbian feminists turned to forming their own organisations to represent their own identities.

The Christchurch branch of SHE was jointly responsible for the establishment of the first Women's Refuge in New Zealand, along with the groups 'Radical Feminist' and 'University Feminists.' A Wellington branch was soon formed which produced, The Circle magazine, which allowed for the circulation of national and international news on lesbian activism between 1973 and 1986. The Wellington branch was also responsible for beginning Club 41 in 1974, the first lesbian club in Wellington. After two months of their formation, the organisation has over 200 members across Christchurch and Wellington.

From 2 March to 3 March 1974, the first National Lesbian Conference was held in Wellington, this led to the development of the Palmerston North SHE branch.

SHE actively campaigned against the Wall Amendment which proposed to criminalise any positive representation of homosexuality to anyone under the age of twenty. They engaged in further campaigning in 1977, making submissions for the Human Rights Commission for it to become illegal to discriminate against someone based on 'sexual orientation.'

SHE eventually drew to a close in 1977 as members within the organisations fell into conflict over what the main purpose of the organisation should be. Groups that came out of this separated into ones that focused on activism, socialising, and education respectively.
