= GLQ =

GLQ may refer to:

- GLQ (journal), a scholarly journal
- Glasgow Queen Street railway station, in Scotland
