= Lavender Menace =

Lesbian radical feminist advocacy group

Lavender Menace was an informal group of lesbian radical feminists formed to protest the exclusion of lesbians and their issues from the feminist movement at the Second Congress to Unite Women in New York City on May 1, 1970. Members included Karla Jay, Martha Shelley, Rita Mae Brown, Lois Hart, Barbara Love, Ellen Shumsky, Artemis March, Cynthia Funk, Linda Rhodes, Arlene Kushner, Ellen Broidy, and Michela Griffo, and were mostly members of the Gay Liberation Front (GLF) and the National Organization for Women (NOW). They later became the Radicalesbians.

== Origins ==
The term "lavender menace" originated as a negative term for the association of lesbianism with the feminist movement, but it was later reclaimed as a positive term by lesbian feminists. The "lavender" aspect of the term stems back to the early 20th century in which lavender shades became popular in women's fashion, and the color took on meaning as a slang term for gay men.

The phrase "Lavender Menace" was reportedly first used in 1969 by Betty Friedan, president of The National Organization for Women (NOW), to describe the threat that she believed associations with lesbianism posed to NOW and the emerging women's movement. Friedan, and some other heterosexual feminists, worried that the association would hamstring feminists' ability to achieve serious political change. Under her direction, NOW attempted to distance itself from lesbian causes – including omitting the New York chapter of the Daughters of Bilitis from the list of sponsors of the First Congress to Unite Women in November 1969. Friedan's remarks and the decision to drop DOB from the sponsor list led lesbian feminist Rita Mae Brown to angrily resign her administrative job at NOW in February 1970. In a New York Times Magazine article on March 15, 1970, straight radical feminist Susan Brownmiller quoted Friedan's remarks about the "lavender menace," which Brownmiller took as an allusion to Cold War era "Red Menace" rhetoric, and dismissed Friedan's worries as "A lavender herring, perhaps, but no clear and present danger."

Brownmiller later said that when she wrote the article, she had intended to use a humorous quip to distance herself from Friedan's homophobia. However, some lesbian feminists, such as Michela Griffo, took her remarks as "a scathing put-down" and "evidence of Susan's homophobia or closet homosexuality—that is, that she was trying to distance herself from lesbians by insulting us." They felt that the quip dismissed lesbians as an insignificant part of the movement, or lesbian issues as unnecessary distractions from the important issues.

"The women's movement had coined the motto 'the personal is political,'" said Karla Jay, in the 2014 documentary She's Beautiful When She's Angry. "But when you were a lesbian and wanted to talk about lesbian relationships, as opposed to heterosexual relationships, they didn't want to hear about it."

== Second Congress to Unite Women ==
Describing lesbian activist Rita Mae Brown, Karla Jay has said: "one thing that you were not going to tell Rita was to shut up." Brown suggested to her consciousness-raising group that lesbian radical feminists organize an action in response to Brownmiller's comments, and the public airing of Friedan's complaints. The group decided to target the Second Congress to Unite Women in New York City on May 1, 1970, which they noticed featured not a single open lesbian on the program. They planned a demonstration for the opening session of the Congress, which would use humor and nonviolent confrontation to raise awareness of lesbians and lesbian issues as vital parts to the emerging women's movement. They prepared a ten-paragraph manifesto entitled "The Woman-Identified Woman" and made T-shirts, dyed lavender and silkscreened with the words "Lavender Menace" for the entire group. They also created rose colored signs with slogans like "Women's Liberation IS A Lesbian Plot" and "You're Going To Love The Lavender Menace" written on them, which were then placed throughout the auditorium.

Karla Jay, one of the organizers and participants in the zap, describes what happened:

Finally, we were ready. The Second Congress to Unite Women got under way on May 1 at 7:00 PM at Intermediate School 70 on West Seventeenth Street in Manhattan. About three hundred women filed into the school auditorium. Just as the first speaker came to the microphone, Jesse Falstein, a GLF member, and Michela [Griffo] switched off the lights and pulled the plug on the mike. (They had cased the place the previous day, and knew exactly where the switches were and how to work them.) I was planted in the middle of the audience, and I could hear my coconspirators running down both aisles. Some were laughing, while others were emitting rebel yells. When Michela and Jesse flipped the lights back on, both aisles were lined with seventeen lesbians wearing their Lavender Menace T-shirts and holding the placards we had made. Some invited the audience to join them. I stood up and yelled, "Yes, yes, sisters! I'm tired of being in the closet because of the women's movement." Much to the horror of the audience, I unbuttoned the long-sleeved red blouse I was wearing and ripped it off. Underneath, I was wearing a Lavender Menace T-shirt. There were hoots of laughter as I joined the others in the aisles. Then Rita [Mae Brown] yelled to members of the audience, "Who wants to join us?"

"I do, I do," several replied.

Then Rita also pulled off her Lavender Menace T-shirt. Again, there were gasps, but underneath she had on another one. More laughter. The audience was on our side.

— Karla Jay, Tales of the Lavender Menace, 143

After the initial stunt, the women passed out mimeographed copies of "The Woman-Identified Woman" and took the stage, where they explained how angry they were about the exclusion of lesbians from the conference and the women's movement as a whole. A few members of the planning committee tried to take back the stage and return to the original program, but gave up in the face of the resolute group and the audience, who used applause and boos to show their support. The group and the audience then used the microphone for a spontaneous speak-out on lesbianism in the feminist movement, and several of the participants in the "zap" were invited to run workshops the next day on lesbian rights and homophobia. Straight and gay women from the congress joined an all-women's dance, a frequent organizing and social tool used by Gay Liberation Front men and women.

After the Congress, the women who had organized the protest began to hold consciousness-raising groups for women of all sexualities. They also changed their name, first to Lesbian Liberation, then to Radicalesbians.

== Effects ==
The "Lavender Menace" zap, and the publication of "The Woman-Identified Woman," are widely remembered by many lesbian-feminists as a turning-point in the second-wave feminist movement, and as a founding moment for lesbian feminism. After the zap, many of the organizers continued to meet, and decided to create a lasting organization to continue their activism, which they eventually decided to call the "Radicalesbians". At the next national conference of NOW, in September 1971, the delegates adopted a resolution recognizing lesbianism and lesbian rights as "a legitimate concern for feminism".

The Lavender Menace Bookshop, an independent gay bookshop in Edinburgh that existed from 1982 to 1986, began as a bookstall called Lavender Books in the cloakroom of Fire Island gay disco on Princes Street, Edinburgh; the name of the stall was taken from the Lavender Menace group.

In 1999, Susan Brownmiller described the impact of the protest and subsequent lesbian-feminist organizing, writing that "Lesbians would be silent no longer in the women's movement." Karla Jay described it in her memoirs as "the single most important action organized by lesbians who wanted the women's movement to acknowledge our presence and needs," and said that it "completely reshaped the relationship of lesbians to feminism for years to come." "We felt as well," Jay wrote, "that the zap was only the first of many actions to come and that lesbian liberation was suddenly and unstoppably on the rise."

== See also ==
- LGBT rights in the United States
- List of LGBT rights organizations
- Transexual Menace
