= Ellen Shumsky =

American lesbian feminist activist

- Known for: secret photography

Ellen Shumsky is a lesbian feminist activist, photographer, psychoanalytic teacher, psychotherapist, supervisor, and writer.

In the late 1960s, Shumsky lived around Southern France in the Languedoc region. This was where she was studying photography, her main mentor was her brother-in-law, Harold Chapman. Over time she became a documentarian, picturing people without warning or awareness.

Shumsky returned from France when the Gay Liberation Front was being formed in the summer of 1969. After her quick return she dedicated herself to the GLF and Radical lesbian activism. Her photographs mainly showed up in underground publications and the GLF newspaper Come Out!

This was the start of her journey to capturing critical political movements and the key events leading up to these movements, she became more self-aware of her herself and the well-being of others.

She was a member of the Lavender Menace in 1970.

She was also one of the founding members of the Radicalesbians, and one of the authors of the 1970 lesbian feminist manifesto "The Woman-Identified Woman", which was written by the Radicalesbians. She is signed to that manifesto as Ellen Bedoz.

Portrait of a Decade: 1968-1978, a collection of her photographs edited by Flavia Rando, was published in 2009. She took many photographs of the feminist, gay liberation and lesbian movements.

She is featured in the feminist history film She's Beautiful When She's Angry.
