= Judy Dlugacz =

American entrepreneur

Judy Dlugacz is an American entrepreneur. She was one of the founders of Olivia Records. Founded in 1973, it was the first woman-owned record company. She also co-founded travel company Olivia Travel with Rachel Wahba in 1990 after not feeling comfortable on a cruise as an out lesbian. The Washington Blade described Olivia Travel as "the premier travel company for queer women". She executive produced HBO's first comedy special featuring lesbian Suzanne Westenhoefer and was nominated for a Chloe Award.

Dlugacz and her partner Claire Lucas, who are raising two children, have been called a power couple.

She was born in New York City and raised on Long Island. She met Lucas in 2008 on an Olivia cruise.

== Honors and awards ==
The Americana Music Association awarded Dlugacz the Jack Emerson Lifetime Achievement Award for Executive Achievement.
