= The Woman-Identified Woman =

Radical feminist manifesto

"The Woman-Identified Woman" was a ten-paragraph manifesto, written by the Radicalesbians in 1970. It was first distributed during the Lavender Menace protest at the Second Congress to Unite Women, hosted by the National Organization for Women (NOW) on May 1, 1970, in New York City in response to the lack of lesbian representation at the congress. It is now considered a turning point in the history of radical feminism and one of the founding documents of lesbian feminism redefining the term "lesbian" as a political identity as well as a sexual one.

It was written by a group of lesbian radical feminists who formed the group Radicalesbians or, originally, the Lavender Menace. The authors consisted of Artemis March, Lois Hart, Rita Mae Brown, Ellen Shumsky, Cynthia Funk, and Barbara XX. It was edited by Artemis March. A group of lesbian radical feminists staged a "zap" for the opening session of the Congress, during which they cut the lights, took over the stage and microphone and denounced the exclusion of lesbian speakers at the Congress. They distributed mimeographed copies of "The Woman-Identified Woman", in which they argued that lesbians are at the forefront of the struggle for women's liberation because their identification with other women defies traditional definitions of women's identity in terms of male sexual partners, and expressed, "...the primacy of women relating to women, of women creating a new consciousness of and with each other which is at the heart of women's liberation, and the basis for the cultural revolution." At the following NOW conference, held in New York City in September 1971, the Congress adopted a resolution acknowledging the rights of lesbians as a "legitimate concern for feminism".

== Background ==
Prior to the release of the “Woman-Identified Woman” manifesto, the gay liberation and women’s liberation movements were primarily separated. Members of the Lavender Menace came from both the Gay Liberation Front and National Organization for Women and, prompting the formation of their own group, had experienced sexism and homophobia respectively from the organizations. The name of the group, in fact, came from the leader of NOW, Betty Friedan, referring to lesbian feminists as a “lavender menace” distracting from the core of the movement. It was the general sentiment of many feminists at the time that lesbianism was a private and personal matter that shouldn’t be mentioned in a public sense and had no place in their discussions. It was this attitude of fellow feminists that thus prompted their organization and the manifesto demanding their inclusion.

== Responses ==
The reception immediately following the zap from attendants of the NOW conference was largely positive and prompted immediate action towards inclusion of lesbians at the conference. This manifested in the form of events added to the program like a workshop of heterosexism as well as congress resolutions as proposed by the Lavender Menace. Those at the conference recall the zap as exciting and the energy of the conference following as empowering. In recollection of the zap, one attendant called it "funny and wonderful" while another noted the members' "wit and vaudevillian charm" in the performative zap.

Outside of the conference, however, reactions were more mixed. More conservative lesbian newsletters at the time such as Lesbian Tide and The Ladder rejected the notions of the manifesto and saw it too radical. Other lesbians rejected the woman-identified label expressing their discomfort in it blurring lines of heterosexual and homosexual women and, despite the stigma surrounding the name, instead opted to embrace and reclaim “lesbian” itself. Another newsletter, Lavender Woman, asserts themselves as “lesbian-identified lesbians” not believing in the comradery with straight women and viewing the women-identified label as a joke.

== Impacts ==
=== Lesbian Advocacy ===
The manifesto was critical of the potentially regressive nature of the feminist movements in the 1970s, namely neglecting the significance of lesbian voices and the importance of incorporating lesbian ideals in the construction of feminist movements. At its publication in the 1970s, it was seen as a pioneer of lesbianism advocacy in feminist political theories.

The delivery of the manifesto was a watershed moment during the period of second-wave feminism. The primary focus of the period was gender inequality in law and culture. The Radicalesbians argued that mere opposition to patriarchy in American society would be ineffective and inefficient to bring about the triumph of feminism, due to the sheer dominance of patriarchy.

The manifesto points out that, although changes have occurred in American society for women, these changes are superficial, nominal displays presented to cope with the rising tide of feminism. The manifesto claims the overt political actions of "liberating women" are overshadowed by the covertly oppressive civil actions of men. It also questions the validity of the core ideals of feminism and feminist movements and alerted feminists to the threat of passive feminine argument.

The manifesto established the foundation for lesbians in feminist politics. This inclusion of lesbians in feminism was formal in the form of pacts written between NOW and the Lavender Menace and informal in the transformed community now more eager to learn. It triggered a ripple effect leading to the emergence of lesbian literature along with feminist writings that further shaped other radical and controversial theories.

=== Woman-Identified and Political Lesbians ===
One of the central grievances of the text is women's inability to self-identify; they are instead being prescribed suppressive sexist and heteronormative roles. This view of females, the authors argued, served only to keep a woman down, "poisoning her existence, keeping her alienated from herself, her own needs, and rendering her a stranger to other women."

Thus, this manifesto introduced the concept of being “woman-identified” which many feminists embraced for themselves as a sign of unified identification between straight women and lesbian women. This pushed the recognition of lesbian issues as simply women’s issues. Moreover, as the manifesto presented being a lesbian as the ultimate rejection of the patriarchy, many women took these ideas and considered themselves political lesbians with the sense they wanted to live with women separated from male society but did not have a sexual attraction to women. Resulting from this was categorization of realesbians, who were sexually attracted to women, and political lesbians, who simply embraced the ideology.

== Limitations ==
Despite connecting the issues of homophobia and sexism, the manifesto did not extend to racial oppression. Some black women activists, especially those engaging in mixed-gender civil rights activism, critiqued the separatism of the manifesto as men weren’t seen as the ultimate source of all their oppression. This lack of racial recognition is something women involved in the movement have also discerned in interviews looking back on their activism.

Additionally, there were some unintended effects of the release of the Woman-Identified Woman manifesto and subsequent movement as feminists were increasingly associated with and, many times, interchangeable with lesbians. Scholars have suggested the manifesto was coopted by antifeminists such as Phyllis Schlafly primarily in the efforts to rally against the Equal Rights Amendment (ERA). In pushing the image of ERA supporters, feminists, as man-hating lesbians, they thus mobilized the country’s homophobia.

== Full text online ==
- "The Woman-Identified Woman" (1970). From Documents from the Women's Liberation Movement, Special Collections Library, Duke University.

== Sources ==
- Jay, Karla (1999). Tales of the Lavender Menace: A Memoir of Liberation (ISBN 0-465-08366-8).
- Faderman, Lillian. The Gay Revolution: The Story of the Struggle. New York: Simon & Schuster, 2015.
