= Ginny Berson =

Radical lesbian feminist activist

Ginny Z. Berson is a radical lesbian feminist, political activist, and community organizer who lived and worked collectively as a lesbian separatist with The Furies Collective and Olivia Records.

== Early life ==
Born in Hartford, Connecticut in 1946, Berson is the second of three daughters. Her parents were first generation Americans of Ashkenazi Jewish descent. Her grandparents immigrated from Eastern Europe at the end of the nineteenth century. The family moved to Fairfield, Connecticut when Berson was in kindergarten and opened a family-run children’s clothing store called the Peter Pan Shop.

=== Athletics ===
From a young age, Berson recognized the professional limitations imposed on women during the mid-twentieth century. One of her childhood dreams was to play baseball in the Major Leagues, however, this opportunity was denied to her because of her gender. She went on to play softball as a shortstop on the Pinturas Glidden softball team while serving in the Peace Corps in Panama, helped organize women’s softball games in Washington DC, played second base for Terry’s Trumpeteers (a fast-pitch Class A lesbian bar softball league in Los Angeles), and played with the East Bay Blues and the Vampire Bats in Oakland, California.

=== Activism and identity formation ===
Berson graduated from Mount Holyoke College in 1967 with a degree in political science. During her time in college, she developed her writing skills and became active in the anti-Vietnam War movement, holding a vigil every week on the college’s campus. The combination of her political research and exposure to elite higher education was a radicalizing moment that solidified her as a political activist, driven by a longing for justice. After graduating from Mount Holyoke, Berson spent two years in the Peace Corps in Panama, where she became fluent in Spanish, gained more experience in community organizing, had a first-hand look at US colonialism, and was certain she was a lesbian.

== The Furies Collective and Olivia Records ==
After serving in the Peace Corps, Berson returned to the US and moved to Washington, DC. She found the Women’s Liberation Movement, came out as a lesbian in 1970, and became a member of The Furies – a radical lesbian separatist collective. She wrote extensively for The Furies newspaper from 1972 to 1973. In 1973, Berson and her romantic partner, Meg Christian, helped found Olivia Records, a national women’s record company created to release music centered on women’s lives. Similar to The Furies, Olivia Records operated as a collective that created an alternative feminist economic institution for women in the music and music distribution industry. Olivia Records, along with Berson and Meg Christian, moved from Washington DC to Los Angeles in March 1975 and then to Oakland in 1977. Christian and Berson ended their relationship in 1976 which led Berson to transition from managing and touring with Christian to working with the record label’s distribution network and eventually leaving Olivia Records in 1980. Berson went on to write a book titled, Olivia on the Record: A Radical Experiment in Women’s Music, published by Aunt Lute Books in the fall of 2020.

== Career in radio ==
After her work within Olivia Records, Berson began a career in radio, working for KPFA-FM first as the Director of Women’s Programming and then the Program Director. In the mid 1990’s, Berson worked as Senior Producer for Live National Events for Pacifica Radio. As part of her work at Pacifica, she collected radio content by attending marches, conventions, concerts, and Nelson Mandela’s triumphal visit to Oakland after his release from prison. She later went on to become the Director of Federation Services for the National Federation of Community Broadcasters.
