= Journal of Lesbian Studies =

- Language: English
- Edited by: Ella Ben Hagai

Publication details
- History: 1997–present
- Publisher: Taylor & Francis
- Frequency: Quarterly

Standard abbreviations
- ISO 4: J. Lesbian Stud.

Indexing
- CODEN: 97660031
- ISSN: 1089-4160 (print); 1540-3548 (web)

Links
- Journal homepage; Online access; Online archive

Journal of Lesbian Studies is a peer-reviewed interdisciplinary academic journal published by Taylor & Francis. It examines the cultural, historical, and interpersonal impact of the lesbian experience on society. The journal is a forum for research and theory, addressing the history, politics, science, race, literature, and life cycle issues of lesbians. It also carries book reviews related to lesbian studies. It was founded in 1997 by Haworth Press, who was acquired by Taylor & Francis in 2007.

== See also ==
- GLQ: A Journal of Lesbian and Gay Studies
