= Lesbian feminism =

Movement emphasizing lesbian perspectives

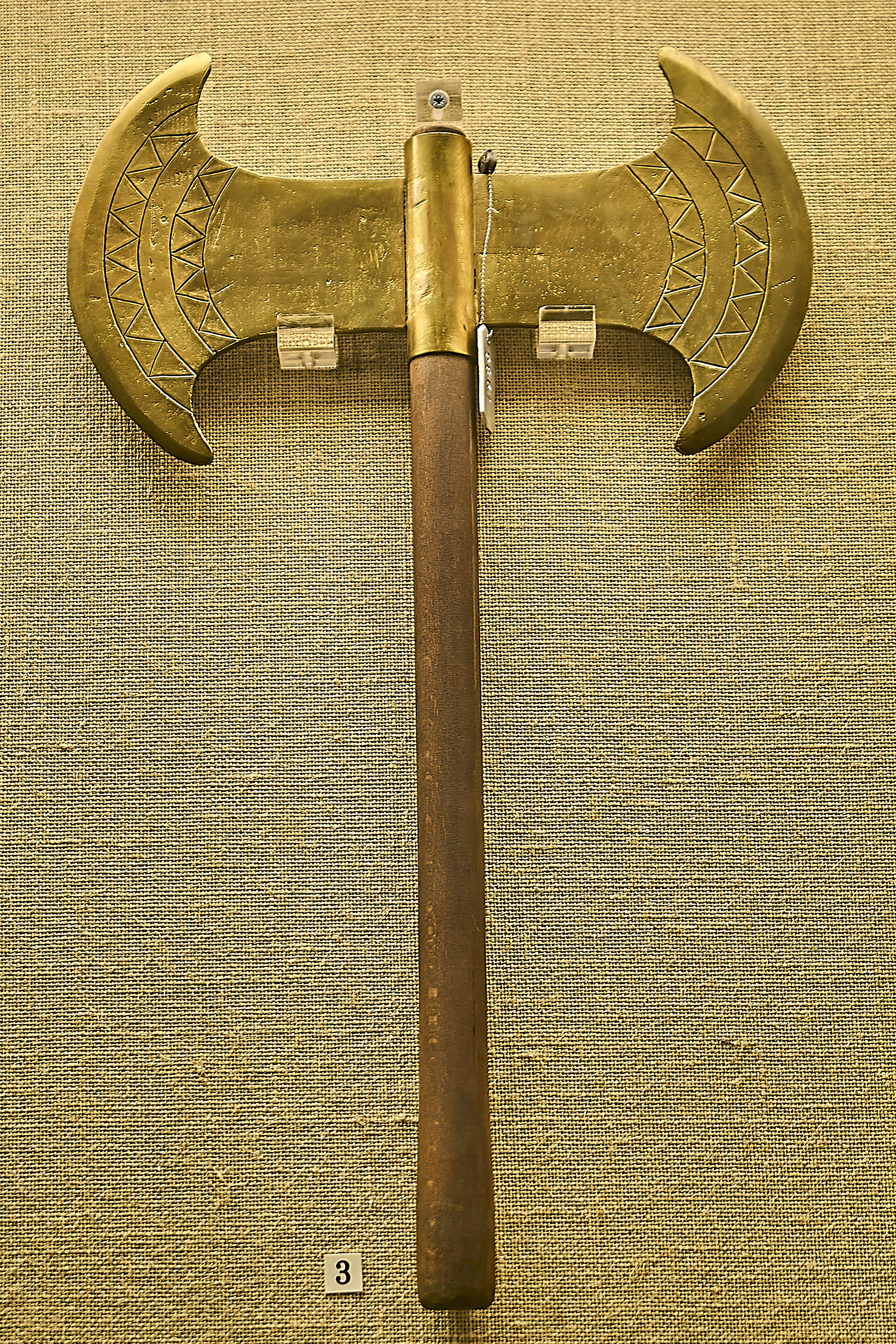
Since the late 1970s, the labrys has been used as a symbolic representation of lesbian and feminist strength and self-sufficiency.

Lesbian feminist pride flag. A labrys superimposed on the black triangle, set against a lavender-purple background.

Lesbian pride flag with double-Venus symbol (in biology and botany, the Venus symbol represents the female sex)

Lesbian feminism is a cultural movement and critical perspective that encourages women to focus their efforts, attentions, relationships, and activities towards women rather than men, and often advocates lesbianism as the logical result of feminism. Lesbian feminism was most influential in the 1970s and early 1980s, primarily in North America and Western Europe, but began in the late 1960s and emerged within the New Left women's movements, who were dissatisfied with the New Left, with the Campaign for Homosexual Equality, sexism within the gay liberation movement, and homophobia within popular women's movements at the time. Many of the supporters of Lesbianism were actually women involved in gay liberation who were tired of the sexism and centering of gay men within the community and lesbian women in the mainstream women's movement who were tired of the homophobia involved in it.

Some key thinkers and activists include Charlotte Bunch, Rita Mae Brown, Adrienne Rich, Audre Lorde, Marilyn Frye, Mary Daly, Sheila Jeffreys, Barbara Smith, Pat Parker, Margaret Sloan-Hunter, Cheryl Clarke, Gloria E. Anzaldúa, Cherríe Moraga, Monique Wittig, and Sara Ahmed (although the last two are more commonly associated with the emergence of queer theory).

As stated by lesbian feminist Sheila Jeffreys, "Lesbian feminism emerged as a result of two developments: lesbians within the Women's liberation movement began to create a new, distinctively feminist lesbian politics, and lesbians in the Gay Liberation Front left to join up with their sisters". According to Judy Rebick, a leading Canadian journalist and feminist activist, lesbians were and always have been "the heart of the women's movement", while their issues were "invisible" in the same movement.

Lesbian feminism of color emerged as a response to lesbian feminism thought that failed to incorporate the issues of class and race as sources of oppression along with heterosexuality.

== Key ideas ==
Lesbian feminism, much like feminism, lesbian and gay studies, and queer theory, is characterized by the ideas of contestation and revision. At the same time, one of the key themes of lesbian feminism is the analysis of heterosexuality as an institution. Lesbian feminist texts work to denaturalise heterosexuality and, based on this denaturalization, to explore heterosexuality's "roots" in institutions such as patriarchy, capitalism, and colonialism. Additionally, lesbian feminism advocates lesbianism as a rational result of alienation and dissatisfaction with these institutions.

Sheila Jeffreys defines lesbian feminism as having seven key themes:

- An emphasis on women's love for one another
- Separatist organizations
- Community and ideas
- Idea that lesbianism is about choice and resistance
- Idea that the personal is political
- A rejection of social hierarchy
- A critique of male supremacy

Lesbian feminist literary critic Bonnie Zimmerman frequently analyzes the language used by writers from within the movement, often drawing from autobiographical narratives and the use of personal testimony. According to Zimmerman, lesbian feminist texts tend to be expressly non-linear, poetic and even obscure.

Lesbian feminists of color argue for intersectionality, in particular the crossings of gender, sex, class, and race, emphasizing that most research and data about sexual orientation is provided by white cis males.

=== Biology, choice and social constructionism ===
As outlined above, lesbian feminism typically situates lesbianism as a form of resistance to "man-made" institutions. Cheryl Clarke writes in her essay New Notes on Lesbianism:

I name myself "lesbian" because this culture oppresses, silences, and destroys lesbians, even lesbians who don't call themselves "lesbians." I name myself "lesbian" because I want to be visible to other black lesbians. I name myself "lesbian" because I do not subscribe to predatory/institutionalized heterosexuality.

However, according to A Dictionary of Gender Studies, some lesbians who believed themselves to be 'born that way' considered political lesbians or those who believe lesbianism is a choice based on the institutionalized heterosexuality were appropriating the term 'lesbian' and not experiencing or speaking out against the oppression that those women experience. Additionally, some feminists argue that "political lesbianism," which reduces lesbianism as a political choice to reject men and the penises, overlooks the deeply personal nature of lesbianism as an expression of attraction between women and erases the experiences of trans women and their lesbian partners.

=== Separatism ===
Lesbian separatism is a form of separatist feminism specific to lesbians. Separatism has been considered by lesbians as both a temporary strategy and as a lifelong practice, but mostly the latter. In separatist feminism, lesbianism is posited as a key feminist strategy that enables women to invest their energies in other women, creating new space and dialogue about women's relationships, and typically, limits their dealings with men.

Lesbian separatism became popular in the 1970s, as some lesbians doubted whether mainstream society or even the gay rights movement had anything to offer them. In 1970, seven women, including Del Martin, confronted the North Conference of Homophile [meaning homosexual] Organizations about the relevance of the gay rights movement to the women within it. The delegates passed a resolution in favor of women's liberation, but Martin felt they had not done enough and wrote "If That's All There Is", an influential 1970 essay in which she decried gay rights organizations as sexist. In the summer of 1971, The Furies Collective formed a commune of twelve women, aged eighteen to twenty-eight, all feminists, all lesbians, all white, with three children among them. They shared chores and clothes, lived together, held some of their money in common, and slept on mattresses on a common floor. They also started a school to teach women auto and home repair so they would not be dependent on men. The newspaper lasted from January 1972 to June 1973; the commune itself ended in 1972.

Charlotte Bunch, an early member of "The Furies", viewed separatist feminism as a strategy, a "first step" period, or temporary withdrawal from mainstream activism to accomplish specific goals or enhance personal growth. Other lesbians, such as Lambda Award winning author Elana Dykewomon, have chosen separatism as a lifelong practice.

In addition to advocating withdrawal from working, personal or casual relationships with men, "The Furies" recommended that lesbian separatists relate "only (with) women who cut their ties to male privilege" and suggested that "as long as women still benefit from heterosexuality, receive its privileges and security, they will at some point have to betray their sisters, especially Lesbian sisters who do not receive those benefits".

This was part of a larger idea that Bunch articulated in Learning from Lesbian Separatism, that "in a male-supremacist society, heterosexuality is a political institution" and the practice of separatism is a way to escape its domination. For The Furies, lesbianism was the only path towards liberation from male supremacy and was seen as more of a political tool rather than a sexual preference.

In her 1988 book, Lesbian Ethics: Towards a New Value, lesbian philosopher Sarah Lucia Hoagland alludes to lesbian separatism's potential to encourage lesbians to develop healthy community ethics based on shared values. Hoagland articulates a distinction (originally noted by Lesbian Separatist author and anthologist Julia Penelope) between a lesbian subculture and a lesbian community; membership in the subculture being "defined in negative terms by an external, hostile culture", and membership in the community being based on "the values we believe we can enact here".

Bette Tallen believes that lesbian separatism, unlike some other separatist movements, is "not about the establishment of an independent state, it is about the development of an autonomous self-identity and the creation of a strong solid lesbian community". Efforts to create woman-centered cultures included the women in print movement, which established feminist periodicals, presses, and bookstores created by and for women. Many lesbians and lesbian separatists were influential in the women in print movement, including Bunch, June Arnold, Barbara Grier, Barbara Smith.

Lesbian historian Lillian Faderman describes the separatist impulses of lesbian feminism which created culture and cultural artifacts as "giving love between women greater visibility" in broader culture. Faderman also believes that lesbian feminists who acted to create separatist institutions did so to "bring their ideals about integrity, nurturing the needy, self-determination and equality of labor and rewards into all aspects of institution-building and economics".

The practice of lesbian separatism sometimes incorporates concepts related to queer nationalism and political lesbianism. Some individuals who identify as lesbian separatists are also associated with the practice of Dianic paganism.

A womyn's land is a women-only intentional community predominantly created, populated, and maintained by lesbian separatists.

Elsewhere, lesbian feminists have situated female separatism as a mainstream phenomenon and explored the mythology surrounding it. Marilyn Frye's essay Some Reflections on Separatism and Power (1977) is one such example. She posits female separatism as a strategy practiced by all women, at some point, and present in many feminist projects (one might cite women's refuges, electoral quotas or women's studies programmes). She argues that it is only when women practice it, self-consciously as separation from men, that it is treated with controversy (or as she suggests hysteria). On the other hand, male separatism (one might cite gentleman's clubs, labour unions, sports teams, the military and, more arguably, decision-making positions in general) is normalized.

Still, other lesbian feminists put forward a notion of "tactical separatism" from men, arguing for and investing in things like women's sanctuaries and consciousness-raising groups, but also exploring everyday practices to which women may temporarily retreat or practice solitude from men and masculinity.

Margaret Sloan-Hunter compared lesbian separatism to black separatism. In her work Making Separatist Connections: The Issue is Woman Identification she stated:

If Lesbian separatism fails it will be because women are so together that we will just exude woman identification wherever we go. But since sexism is much older than racism, it seems that we must for now embrace separatism, at least psychically, for health and consciousness sake. This is a revolution, not a public relations campaign, we must keep reminding ourselves.

Some of the lesbian feminist groups, however, were skeptical of separatism. As such, a prominent black lesbian feminist group, the Combahee River Collective, stated that separatism is not a viable political strategy for them.

=== The woman-identified woman ===
If the founding of the lesbian feminist movement could be pinpointed to a specific moment, it would probably be May 1970, when Radicalesbians, a radical feminist activist group of 20 lesbians, including novelist Rita Mae Brown, took over the Second Congress to Unite Women, a women's conference in New York City. Uninvited, they lined up on stage wearing matching T-shirts inscribed with the words "Lavender Menace", and demanded the microphone to read aloud their manifesto, "The Woman-Identified Woman", which laid out the main precepts of their movement. Later on, Adrienne Rich incorporated this concept in her essay "Compulsory Heterosexuality and Lesbian Existence", in which she unpacks the idea that patriarchy dictates women to be focused on men or to be "men-identified women. Becoming women-identified women, i.e. changing the focus of attention and energy from men to women, is a way to resist the patriarchal oppression".

Contrary to some popular beliefs about "man-hating butch dykes", lesbian feminist theory does not support the concept of female masculinity. Proponents like Sheila Jeffreys have argued that "all forms of masculinity are problematic".

This is one of the principal areas in which lesbian feminism differs from queer theory, perhaps best summarized by Jack Halberstam's quip that "If Sheila Jeffreys didn't exist, Camille Paglia would have had to invent her."

=== Womyn's culture ===
"Womyn" along with "wimmin" and "womin" were terms created by alliances within the lesbian feminist movement to distinguish them from men and masculine (or "phallogocentric") language. The term "women" was seen as derivative of men and ultimately symbolized the prescriptive nature of women's oppression. A new vocabulary emerged more generally, sometimes referencing lost or unspoken matriarchal civilizations, Amazonian warriors, ancient – especially Greek – goddesses, sometimes parts of the female anatomy and often references to the natural world. It was frequently remarked that the movement had nothing to go on, no knowledge of its roots, nor histories of lesbianism to draw on. Hence the emphasis on consciousness-raising and carving out new (arguably) "gynocentric" cultures.

In 1974, the Salsa Soul Sisters was formed in New York City as a Black lesbian organization, which recognized the triple oppression of gender, race, and class, rather than just gender, like the "womyn's" culture.

== Lesbians and mainstream feminism ==
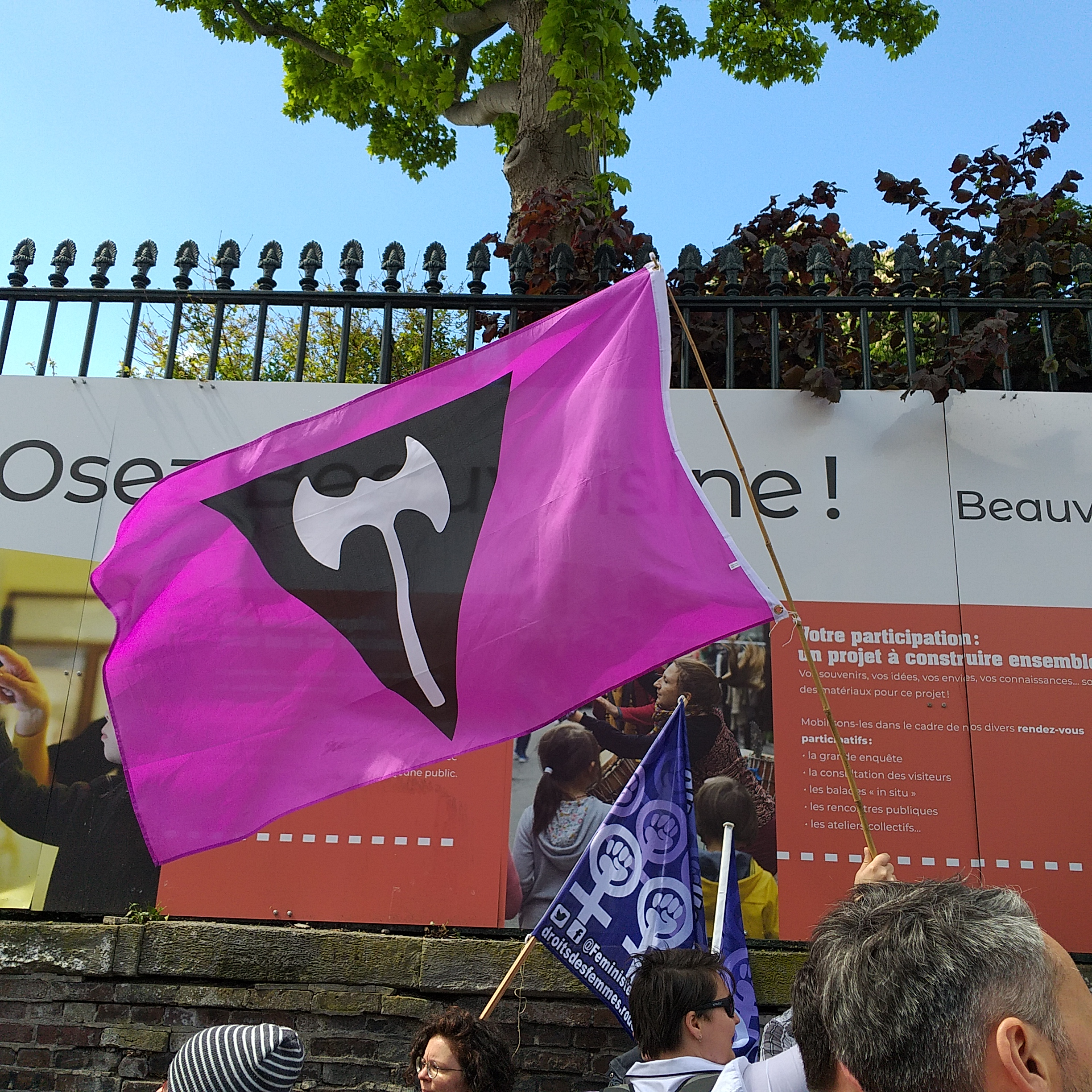
Gay pride parade, Rouen, France (2019)

As a critical perspective, lesbian feminism is perhaps best defined in opposition to mainstream feminism and queer theory. It has certainly been argued that mainstream feminism has been guilty of homophobia in its failure to integrate sexuality as a fundamental category of gendered inquiry and its treatment of lesbianism as a separate issue. In this respect, Adrienne Rich's 1980 classic text "Compulsory Heterosexuality and Lesbian Existence" is instructive and one of the landmarks in lesbian feminism.

=== Influence within feminist organizations ===
==== National Organization for Women (USA) ====
Lesbians have been active in the mainstream American feminist movement. The first time lesbian concerns were introduced into the National Organization for Women (NOW) was in 1969, when Ivy Bottini, an open lesbian who was then president of the New York chapter of NOW, held a public forum titled "Is Lesbianism a Feminist Issue?". However, NOW president Betty Friedan was against lesbian participation in the movement. In 1969, she referred to growing lesbian visibility as a "lavender menace" and fired openly lesbian newsletter editor Rita Mae Brown, and in 1970, she engineered the expulsion of lesbians, including Bottini, from NOW's New York chapter. In response, on the first evening, when four hundred feminists were assembled in the auditorium at the Congress to Unite Women, a group of twenty women wearing T-shirts that read "Lavender Menace" came to the front of the room and faced the audience. One of the women then read the group's declaration, The Woman-Identified Woman, the first major lesbian feminist statement. The group, which later named themselves Radicalesbians, were among the first to challenge the heterosexism of heterosexual feminists and to describe lesbian experience in positive terms. In 1971, NOW passed a resolution that proclaimed "a woman's right to her own person includes the right to define and express her own sexuality and to choose her own lifestyle", as well as a conference resolution stating that forcing lesbian mothers to stay in marriages or to live a secret existence in an effort to keep their children was unjust. That year, NOW also committed to offering legal and moral support in a test case involving child custody rights of lesbian mothers. In 1973, the NOW Task Force on Sexuality and Lesbianism was established.

In 1967, Del Martin and Phyllis Lyon were the first lesbian couple to join NOW. Martin was the first open lesbian elected by the organization.

==== Old Lesbians Organizing for Change ====
In 2014, Old Lesbians Organizing for Change (OLOC) issued an "Anti-Sexism Statement" which states:

Men run the world and women are supposed to serve according to the belief that men are superior to women, which is patriarchy. Patriarchy is the system by which men's universal power is maintained and enforced. OLOC works toward the end of patriarchy and the liberation of all women.

=== Influence within governmental institutions ===
==== National Plan of Action of the 1977 National Women's Conference (USA) ====
In November 1977, the National Women's Conference issued a National Plan of Action, which stated in part:

Congress, State, and local legislatures should enact legislation to eliminate discrimination on the basis of sexual and affectional preference in areas including, but not limited to, employment, housing, public accommodations, credit, public facilities, government funding, and the military. State legislatures should reform their penal codes or repeal State laws that restrict private sexual behavior between consenting adults. State legislatures should enact legislation that would prohibit consideration of sexual or affectional orientation as a factor in any judicial determination of child custody or visitation rights. Rather, child custody cases should be evaluated solely on the merits of which party is the better parent, without regard to that person's sexual and affectional orientation.

=== Feminist culture ===
American photographer Deborah Bright created a series called Dream Girls which challenged mainstream gender-sex identities that the Hollywood industry in the 1980s chose to propagate.

== Tensions with queer theory and trans feminism ==
The emergence of queer theory in the 1990s built upon certain principles of lesbian feminism, including the critique of compulsory heterosexuality, the understanding of gender as defined in part by heterosexuality, and the understanding of sexuality as institutional instead of personal. Despite this, queer theory is largely set in opposition to traditional lesbian feminism. Whereas lesbian feminism is traditionally critical of BDSM, butch/femme identities and relationships, transgender and transsexual people, pornography, and prostitution, queer theory tends to embrace them. Queer theorists embrace gender fluidity and subsequently have critiqued lesbian feminism as having an essentialist understanding of gender that runs counter to their stated aims. Lesbian feminists have critiqued queer theory as implicitly male-oriented and a recreation of the male-oriented Gay Liberation Front that lesbian feminists initially sought refuge from. Queer theorists have countered by pointing out that the majority of the most prominent queer theorists are feminists and many (including Judith Butler, Jack Halberstam, and Gayle Rubin) are, or have at one point identified as lesbians.

Peter Barry suggests that in choosing between these possible alignments (lesbian feminism and/or queer theory) one must answer whether it is gender or sexuality that is the more "fundamental in personal identity."

=== Views on butch/femme identities and relationships ===
Some lesbian feminists have argued that butch–femme is a replication of heterosexual relations, while other commentators argue that, while it resonates with heterosexual patterns of relating, butch–femme simultaneously challenges it.

In the 1970s, the development of lesbian feminism pushed butch–femme roles out of popularity. Lesbian separatists such as Sheila Jeffreys argued that all forms of masculinity, including masculine butch women, were negative and harmful to women. The group of radical lesbians often credited with sparking lesbian feminism, Radicalesbians, called butch culture "male-identified role-playing among lesbians."

While butch–femme roles had previously been the primary way of identifying lesbians and quantifying lesbian relationships in the 1940s, 1950s, and 1960s, lesbian feminist ideology had turned these roles into a "perversion of lesbian identity". Lesbian feminism was publicly represented though white feminism, and often excluded and alienated working class lesbians and lesbians of color. In these excluded communities, butch–femme roles persisted and grew throughout the 1970s. Despite the criticism from both middle-class lesbians and lesbian feminists, butch and femme roles reemerged in the 1980s and 1990s, but were no longer relegated to only working-class lesbians.

=== Views on BDSM ===
Because of its focus on equality in sexual relationships, lesbian feminism has traditionally been opposed to any form of BDSM that involve perpetuation of gender stereotypes. This view was challenged in the late 1970s, most notably by the Samois group, a San Francisco-based lesbian-feminist organization focused on BDSM. Samois members felt strongly that their way of practicing BDSM was entirely compatible with feminism, and held that the kind of feminist sexuality advocated by Women Against Violence in Pornography and Media was conservative and puritanical.

In contrast, many black lesbian feminists have spoken out against the practice of BDSM as racist. According to scholars Darlene Pagano, Karen Sims, and Rose Mason, sadomasochism, in particular, is a practice that often lacks sensitivity to the black female experience as it can be historically linked to similar forms of sexual violence and dominance enacted against black female slaves.

=== Views on bisexuality ===
Bisexuality is rejected by some lesbian feminists as being a reactionary and anti-feminist backlash to lesbian feminism.

A bisexual woman filed a lawsuit against the lesbian feminist magazine Common Lives/Lesbian Lives, alleging discrimination against bisexuals when her submission was not published.

A number of women who were at one time involved in lesbian feminist activism came out as bisexual after realizing their attractions to men. A widely studied example of lesbian-bisexual conflict within feminism was the Northampton Pride March during the years between 1989 and 1993, where many feminists involved debated over whether bisexuals should be included and whether or not bisexuality was compatible with feminism. Common lesbian feminist critiques leveled at bisexuality were that bisexuality was anti-feminist, that bisexuality was a form of false consciousness, and that bisexual women who pursue relationships with men were "deluded and desperate." However, tensions between bisexual feminists and lesbian feminists have eased since the 1990s, as bisexual women have become more accepted within the feminist community.

Nevertheless, some lesbian feminists such as Julie Bindel are still critical of bisexuality. Bindel has described female bisexuality as a "fashionable trend" being promoted due to "sexual hedonism" and questioned whether bisexuality even exists. She has also made tongue-in-cheek comparisons of bisexuals to cat fanciers and devil worshippers.

Lesbian feminist Sheila Jeffreys writes in The Lesbian Heresy (1993) that while many feminists are comfortable working alongside gay men, they are uncomfortable interacting with bisexual men. Jeffreys states that while gay men are unlikely to sexually harass women, bisexual men are just as likely to be troublesome to women as heterosexual men.

In contrast, Bi Any Other Name (1991), an anthology edited by Loraine Hutchins and Lani Kaʻahumanu considered one of the seminal books in the history of the modern bisexual rights movement, contains (among other things) the piece, "Bisexuality: The Best Thing That Ever Happened to Lesbian Feminism?", by Beth Elliot.

=== Views on transgender people ===
Though lesbian feminists' views vary, there is a specific lesbian feminist canon which rejects the transgender rights movement, transsexuals and transvestites, positing transgender people as gender dupes or functions of a discourse on mutilation; or additionally, shoring up support for traditional and violent gender norms. This is a position marked by intense controversy. Sheila Jeffreys summarized the arguments on this topic in Unpacking Queer Politics (2003) and Gender Hurts (2014).

These views on transgender people have been criticized by many in the LGBT and feminist communities as transphobic and constituting hate speech against transgender men and women.

Lesbian feminism is sometimes associated with opposition to sex reassignment surgery, as some lesbian feminist analyses see sex reassignment surgery as a form of violence akin to BDSM.

In 1979, lesbian feminist Janice Raymond published The Transsexual Empire: The Making of the She-Male. Controversial even then, Raymond's book looks at the role of transsexualism – particularly psychological and surgical approaches to it – and posits that it reinforces traditional gender stereotypes and that the medical-psychiatric community is culpable in promoting sex reassignment surgery and what would come to be known as gender-affirming care.

Raymond maintains that transgender identities are based on the "patriarchal myths" of "male mothering," and "making of woman according to man's image." She claims this is done in order "to colonize feminist identification, culture, politics and sexuality," adding: "All transsexuals rape women's bodies by reducing the real female form to an artifact, appropriating this body for themselves .... Transsexuals merely cut off the most obvious means of invading women, so that they seem non-invasive." In her book, Raymond includes sections on Sandy Stone, a trans woman who had worked as a sound engineer for Olivia Records, and Christy Barsky, accusing both of creating divisiveness in women's spaces. These writings have been heavily criticized as personal attacks on these individuals.

In Living a Feminist Life (2017), Sara Ahmed imagines lesbian feminism as a fundamental and necessary alliance with trans feminism. Ahmed considered that an anti-trans stance is an anti-feminist stance, and against the feminist project of creating worlds to support those for whom gender fatalism (i.e. boys will be boys, girls will be girls) is deleterious.

== Lesbian of color feminism ==
Feminism among lesbians of color emerged as a response to the texts produced by white lesbian feminist authors in the late 1970s. Typically, lesbian feminism at the time failed to recognize issues related to intersectionality between race, gender, and class. Apart from this, lesbian feminists of color addressed the relationship between feminism as a movement and "ideology of cultural nationalism or racial pride", as well as the differences found in the prevalent texts. Among the most influential lesbian feminists of color are Audre Lorde, Gloria E. Anzaldúa, Cherrie Moraga, Barbara Smith, Pat Parker, Kate Rushin, Margaret Sloan-Hunter, Cheryl Clarke, and Ochy Curiel. Audre Lorde addressed how these movements should intersect in her 1979 speech "The Master's Tools Will Never Dismantle the Master's House". In particular, she stated:

As women, we have been taught either to ignore our differences, or to view them as causes for separation and suspicion rather than as forces for change. Without community, there is no liberation, only the most vulnerable and temporary armistice between an individual and her oppression. But community must not mean a shedding of our differences, nor the pathetic pretense that these differences do not exist.

=== Black lesbian feminism ===
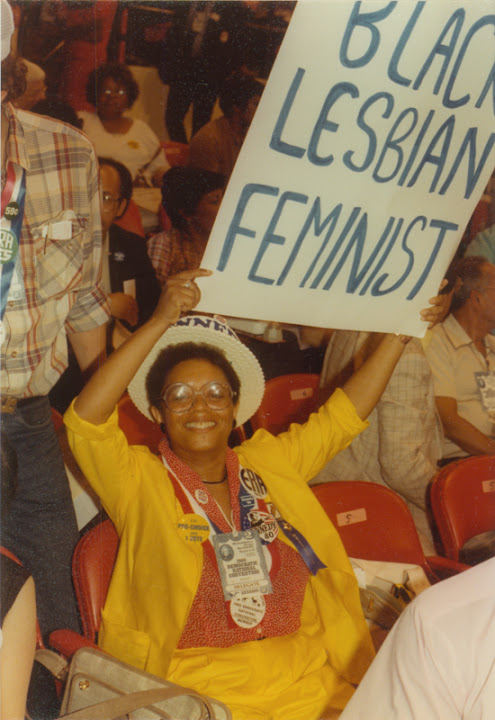
1980 Democratic National Convention

Black lesbian feminism originates from black feminism and the civil rights movement in the beginning of the 1970s. Kaila Adia Story, a contemporary black lesbian feminist scholar, defines black lesbian feminism "as the thought and praxis of an intersectional gendered and sexual analysis of the world's relationship to queer women of color specifically, both cis and trans". The prominent authors who were at the roots of black lesbian feminism include Audre Lorde, Barbara Smith, Pat Parker, Kate Rushin, Doris Davenport, Cheryl Clarke, and Margaret Sloan-Hunter.

Black lesbian feminism emerged as a venue to address the issue of racism in the mainstream feminist movement, which was described as white, middle-class, and predominantly heterosexual. According to a 1979 statement by Barbara Smith, "the reason racism is a feminist issue is easily explained by the inherent definition of feminism", which is "the political theory and practice to free all women: women of color, working-class women, poor women, physically challenged women, lesbians, old women, as well as white economically privileged heterosexual women." Later, in 1984, she extended her views on black lesbian feminism mission to "a movement committed to fighting sexual, racial, economic and heterosexist oppression, not to mention one which opposes imperialism, anti-Semitism, the oppressions visited upon the physically disabled, the old and the young, at the same time that it challenges militarism and imminent nuclear destruction is the very opposite of narrow."

Most prominent black lesbian feminists were writers rather than scholars and expressed their position in literary ways. Allida Mae Black states that unlike black feminism, in 1977 the position of black lesbian feminism was not as clear as the position of black feminism and was "an allusion in the text". Apart from this, the position of black lesbian feminists was expressed in their interviews and public speeches. As such, in a 1980 interview published in The American Poetry Review, Audre Lorde stated that a "true feminist deals out of a lesbian consciousness whether or not she ever sleeps with women", as well as that all black women, whether they admit it or not, are lesbians because they are "raised in the remnants of a basically matriarchal society" and are still oppressed by patriarchy.

Pat Parker's work reflected the oppression she suffered and observed in the lives of other women. In her poem Have you Ever Tried to Hide, Parker calls out racism in the white feminist movement. In her multiple works, including the poem "Womanslaughter", she drew attention to the violence Black women experience in their lives. Among others, Parker defended the idea of complex identities and stated that, for her, revolution will happen when all elements of her identity "can come along".

==== Combahee River Collective ====
The Combahee River Collective is a Boston-based black feminist group that was formed as a radical alternative to the National Black Feminist Organization (NBFO) founded by Margaret Sloan-Hunter in 1973. For the organization's members, NBFO lacked attention to the issues of sexuality and economic oppression. The Collective united the women who were dissatisfied with racism in the white feminist movement and sexism in the civil rights movement. The name of the organization alludes to the Underground Railroad Combahee River Raid that happened in 1863 under Harriet Tubman's leadership and freed 750 slaves. The Combahee River Collective issued a statement in 1977 that described the organization's vision as being opposed to all forms of oppression — including sexuality, gender identity, class, disability, and age oppression (later incorporated in the concept of intersectionality) that shaped the conditions on black women's lives.

In its "Statement", the Combahee River Collective defined itself as a left-wing organization leaning towards socialism and anti-imperialism. The organization also claimed that, unlike some white feminist groups or NBFO, the Collective members are in "solidarity with progressive Black men and do not advocate the fractionalization" and emphasized that "the stance of Lesbian separatism ... is not a viable political analysis or strategy."

Other organizations under the stance of black lesbian feminism include Salsa Soul Sisters, formed in 1974 in New York City and considered to be the oldest black lesbian feminist organization; and Sapphire Sapphos, formed in 1979 in Washington, DC.

==== Visual art and film ====
Aishah Shahidah Simmons, an award-winning black lesbian feminist, made NO! The Rape Documentary (2006), a documentary that explores how rape is used as a weapon of homophobia. For Simmons, a sexual assault survivor herself, the film was also an exploration of how rape impacted her Black feminist lesbian journey.

=== Chicana lesbian feminism ===
Chicana lesbian feminism emerged from the Chicana feminist movement in the late 1970s and early 1980s. During this time, Chicana feminism began to form as a "social movement aimed to improve the position of Chicanas in American society." Chicanas separated from the Chicano movement began drawing their own political agendas, and started to question their traditional female roles. Specifically, Chicana feminists (see also Chicana literature) started addressing the forces that affected them as women of color and fighting for social equality.

In With Her Machete in Her Hand: Reading Chicana Lesbians (2009), the first monograph dedicated to the work of Chicana lesbians, Catriona Rueda Esquibel stated "Chicana lesbians are central to understanding Chicana/o communities, theories, and feminisms." Similarly to black lesbian feminists, Chicana lesbian feminists use literature as a way of naming themselves, expressing their ideas, and reclaiming their experiences, flagged with a number of accusations. They are accused of being lesbians, of betraying society by denying men of their reproductive role, and of betraying their Chicana identity by adhering to feminist and lesbian ideologies, both things considered by Chicano culture as "white" notions. The key Chicana lesbian feminist thinkers include Cherrie Moraga, Gloria Anzaldúa, Lidia Tirado White, Alicia Gaspar de Alba, Emma Pérez, Carla Trujillo, Monica Palacios, Ana Castillo, Natashia López, and Norma Alarcón.

In the feminist anthology This Bridge Called My Back: Writings by Radical Women of Color, Moraga and Anzaldúa describe the Chicana lesbian feminist mission as follows: "we attempt to bridge the contradictions in our experience. We are the colored in a white feminist movement. We are the feminists among the people of our culture. We are often the lesbians among the straight. We do this bridging by naming ourselves and by telling our stories in our own words."

One of the foundational concepts of Chicana lesbian feminist movement is "theory in the flesh", which is "flesh and blood experiences of the woman of color." Specifically, as described by Moraga and Anzaldúa, "a theory in flesh means one where the typical realities of our lives —our skin color, the land or concrete we grew up on, our sexual belongings—all fuse to create a political born out of necessity." In Moraga's article La Güera, she continues making reference to the theory in the flesh: "it wasn't until I acknowledged and confronted my own lesbianism in the flesh, that my heartfelt identification with and empathy for my mother's oppression —due to being poor, uneducated, Chicana— was realized." Furthermore, this theory incorporates the ideas of finding strength in and celebrating each other's difference as well as reinterpreting the history by "shaping new myths", and lays in a process of naming themselves but also naming the enemies within oneself to break down paradigms. As Moraga explains in her prose Loving in the War Years: Lo que nunca paso por sus labios:

In this country, lesbianism is a poverty — as is being brown, as is being a woman, as is being just plain poor. The danger lies in ranking the oppressions. The danger lies in failing to acknowledge the specificity of the oppression. The danger lies in attempting to deal with oppression purely from a theoretical base. Without an emotional, heartfelt grappling with the source of our own oppression, without naming the enemy within ourselves and outside of us, no authentic, non-hierarchical connection among oppressed groups can take place.

==== Genres and main themes ====
Chicana lesbian feminists challenge traditional forms of knowledge production and introduce new ways of knowledge creation through new forms of writing. Many Chicana lesbian feminists use what Teresa de Lauretis named "fiction/theory", "a formally experimental, critical and lyrical, autobiographical and theoretically conscious, practice of writing-in-the-feminine that crosses genre boundaries (poetry and prose, verbal and visual modes, narrative and cultural criticism), and instates new correlations between signs and meanings." They combine genres such as autobiography, poetry, theory, personal diaries or imaginary interviews. At the same time, Chicana lesbian feminists today navigate and struggle across a variety of discursive contexts (as activists, academics, feminists, and artists).

Through their literature and art, Chicana lesbian feminists explore their body-lived experiences, a fundamental aspect in the construction of lesbian identity. They reclaim the idea of the real body and the physical aspect of it. Chicana lesbian feminists bring into the discussion the conflicts with the concept of la familia, the new familias they create, and their right to choose their own sexuality. Martha Barrera writes "we are just as valid a familia as we would be if she were a brown man who I married in the Catholic Church." At the same time they try to find reconciliation with their familia. Juanita M. Sánchez writes:

my father wanted me to go to work my grandmother wanted me to speak more Spanish she couldn't speak English i wanted to make a living selling popsicles on my 1948 cushman scooter nothing turned out like they wanted but my mother did say, "if you want to be with a woman, que le hace, as long as you're happy".

Chicana lesbian feminists confront their lesbian identity with their Chicano identity. This constitutes a central aspect of Chicana lesbian literature. Renée M. Martinez expresses her impossibility to reconcile the two identities: "being a Chicana and a lesbian, my parents' daughter and a lesbian, alive and a lesbian", lesbianism "would sever me from everything that counted in my life: homosexuality, the ultimate betrayal of my Mexican heritage, was only for white people." Moraga writes how:

the woman who defies her role ... is purported to be a "traitor to her race" by contributing to the "genocide" of her people ... In short, even if the defiant woman is not a lesbian, she is purported to be one; for, like the lesbian in the Chicano imagination, she is una Malinchista. Like the Malinche of Mexican history, she is corrupted by foreign influences which threaten to destroy her people. ... Lesbianism can be construed by the race then as the Chicana being used by the white man, even if the man never lays a hand on her. The choice is never seen as her own. Homosexuality is his disease with which he sinisterly infects Third World people, men and women alike.

== See also ==
- Feminist movements and ideologies
- Feminist views on sexual orientation
- Heteropatriarchy
- June L. Mazer Lesbian Archives
- Lesbian erasure
- Lesbian Feminist Circle
- Lesbian Herstory Archives
- Lesbian science fiction
- Lesbophobia
- List of lesbian periodicals
- Sappho Was a Right-on Woman
