= Common Lives/Lesbian Lives =

U.S. publication

- Frequency: Quarterly
- Circulation: 2500
- First issue: 1980
- Final issue: 1996
- Based in: Iowa City, Iowa
- Language: English
- ISSN: 0891-6969
- OCLC: 8234014

Common Lives/Lesbian Lives (CL/LL) was a collectively produced lesbian quarterly which published out of Iowa City, Iowa, from 1981 to 1996. The magazine had a stated commitment to reflect the diversity of lesbians by actively soliciting and printing in each issue the work and ideas of lesbians of color, Jewish lesbians, fat lesbians, lesbians over fifty and under twenty years old, disabled lesbians, poor and working-class lesbians, and lesbians of varying cultural backgrounds. Common Lives/Lesbian Lives was a cultural milestone in the lesbian publishing world, as it was one of the first lesbian journals or magazines published from outside the urban/coastal New York/Los Angeles/Berkeley scene.

== History ==
Common Lives/Lesbian Lives (CL/LL) was initiated by eight lesbians who were living in the Los Angeles area in late 1980. Catherine Nicholson and Harriet Ellenberger (also known as Harriet Desmoines), co-founders of the lesbian periodical Sinister Wisdom, were supportive of the new publication because Sinister Wisdom received more submissions than they could print. The CL/LL group moved to Iowa City later that year and started the magazine shortly afterwards. The core group of contributors and editors included Cindy Cleary, Anne Lee, and Tracy Moore. Moore was also involved in the Ain't I a Woman? collective, which published a newsletter of the same name from 1971 to 1974.

CL/LL was associated with the women in print movement (WIP), an effort by second-wave feminists and women's liberationists to establish autonomous communications networks created by and for women. Many of the women involved with the movement were lesbian feminists and feminist separatists. WIP feminists in Iowa City also founded Iowa City Women's Press and a typesetting firm owned and operated by women, which made Iowa City an inviting home for the new journal.

The first issue of Common Lives/Lesbian Lives was published in 1981, and the journal eventually reached a peak circulation of about 2,500 national and international subscribers.CL/LL's main distributor, Inland, declared bankruptcy in 1995. The 1995 fall issue was not published, and eventually Issue 56, which was to be the last, was published as the 1995–1996 issue. Despite efforts to raise money, Common Lives/Lesbian Lives officially closed in 1997.

In 2024, Sinister Wisdom published Issue 134: Lives of Common Lesbians, a tribute to Common Lives, Lesbian Lives. Sinister Wisdom editor Julie R. Enszer and a team of interns researched CL/LL and recorded oral history interviews with many of the original editors, who reunited to form an editorial collective for the CL/LL issue of Sinister Wisdom.

== Content ==
The publishing collective wanted the magazine to be "inclusive, non-academic, diverse and accessible". Most contributors had never been published before.

All work published in CL/LL was produced by self-defined lesbians, and all of the project's volunteers were lesbians. Due to this policy, a complaint was filed with the University of Iowa Human Rights Commission by a heterosexual woman who believed she was discriminated against when she was not hired as an intern. A complaint was also lodged with the University of Iowa Human Rights Commission by a bisexual woman whose submission to the magazine was not published.

In 1982, the University of Iowa printing department refused to print issue 20 CL/LL of because it contained photographs of lesbians making love. The magazine sued the university and won.

== Archives ==
The Iowa Women's Archives in the University of Iowa Libraries hosts Cl/LL archival material.

The Lavender Library, Archives and Cultural Exchange in Sacramento, California holds a substantial collection of the magazines.

== Contributors ==
Some of the contributors to the magazine included: Elana Dykewomon, Tee Corinne, Sapphire, Hawk Madrone, Julia Penelope, Candis Graham, Martha Miller, and Ruth Mountaingrove.

== See also ==
- Lesbian feminism
- Lesbian literature
- Category: Lesbian organizations
- List of lesbian periodicals in the United States
- Women in print movement
