= With Her Machete in Her Hand =

2006 book by Catrióna Rueda Esquibel

With Her Machete in Her Hand: Reading Chicana Lesbians
- Author: Catrióna Rueda Esquibel
- Published: 2006
- Publisher: University of Texas Press
- Pages: 263
- ISBN: 978-0-292-79625-6
- OCLC: 657193711

With Her Machete in Her Hand: Reading Chicana Lesbians is a non-fiction book by American academic Catrióna Rueda Esquibel about lesbian and lesbian relationships in Chicano literature, written by both lesbian and non-lesbian authors. It was published in 2006 by the University of Texas Press, and the title is a reference to Américo Paredes' 1958 book With His Pistol in His Hand and a poem by Gloria Anzaldúa.
