= Lesbian Feminist Circle =

Lesbian magazine from New Zealand

- First issue of The Circle from December 1973
- Publisher: Sisters for Homophile Equality
- First issue: December 1973
- Final issue: 1986
- Based in: Wellington, New Zealand
- OCLC: 70735762

The Circle was a lesbian journal collectively produced by the Sisters for Homophile Equality (SHE) in Wellington, New Zealand between December 1973 and 1986. The magazine was renamed Lesbian Feminist Circle in 1977, and continued to publish until 1986.

Circle, which was printed by Herstory Press, the country's first feminist and lesbian press, initially reprinted articles from international lesbian magazines; eventually the magazine's publishing collective began to write and collect historical, political and theoretical material with a New Zealand focus that was of interest to local lesbian feminists.

== See also ==
- Lesbian literature
- List of lesbian periodicals
- LGBT New Zealand
