= Bette Tallen =

American scholar (1950–2023)

Bette Sharon Tallen
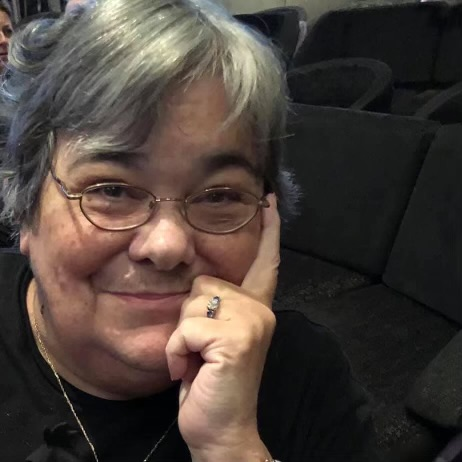
- Education: City College of New York; University of Michigan (PhD)
- Known for: Feminist lesbian activist
- Spouse: Carol Ann Thomas (m. 2019)

Bette Sharon Tallen (1950-2023) was an American scholar and activist. Tallen was part of the radical lesbian feminist separatist movement and gained recognition for her early academic contributions in the field. Her later work focused on diversity programming, affirmative action, and a feminist critique of twelve step programs.

== Early life and education ==
Bette Sharon Tallen was born in New York City to Nathaniel and Anne G. Tallen.

After graduating from Hunter College High School, Tallen received a bachelor's degree from the City College of New York, followed by a Doctor of Philosophy in political science from the University of Michigan.

== Career ==
Tallen taught at Ramapo College, Rollins College, and the University of Central Florida.

Congruent with her teaching, Tallen was active in many campus community programs and student groups. She worked in a shelter for women victims of domestic violence, and revived the Women's Services and Lesbian and Gay Alliance at the State University of New York. After retiring from teaching at the University of Central Florida, Tallen represented at-risk children in legal proceedings through the Guardian Ad Litem program.

== Personal life ==
Tallen married Carol Ann Thomas on November 16, 2019.

Tallen died on November 15, 2023. At the time of her death, she lived in Winter Park, Florida.
