= Olivia Travel =

Travel company

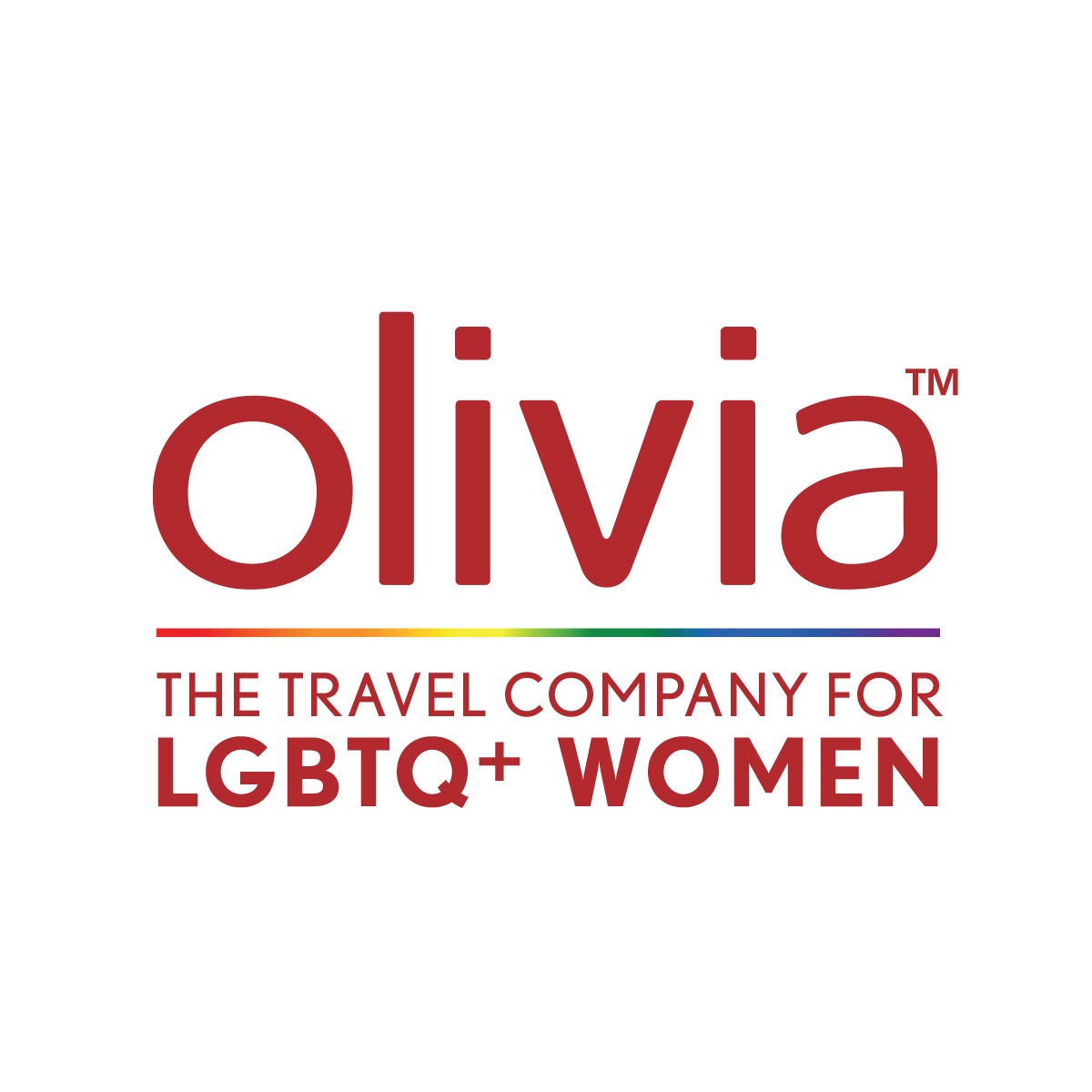
- Company type: Travel
- Founded: 1973
- Founders: Judy Dlugacz and Rachel Wahba
- Headquarters: San Francisco, United States
- Revenue: $25 million (2007)
- Website: www.olivia.com

Olivia Travel is a travel company that creates cruise and resort vacations curated for lesbian and LGBTQ+ women. Olivia was co-founded by Judy Dlugacz and Rachel Wahba as a reimagination of Olivia Records' mission of lesbian representation and freedom.

The Olivia brand was launched in 1973.

The premiere of The L Word in 2004 was hosted on an Olivia cruise. One of its episodes, Land Ahoy, was set on one of the ships Olivia uses.

Olivia offered its first all-woman cruise in 1990 and remains the only travel company in the world offering cruise, resort, riverboat, and adventure trips curated for lesbians and LGBTQ+ women.

Olivia takes its name from the heroine of a pulp novel by Dorothy Bussy who fell in love with her headmistress at a French boarding school.

== Endorsement ==
The company has attracted attention due to endorsements from lesbian celebrities, such as golfer Rosie Jones (who was the first professional athlete in America to endorse a gay-oriented company) tennis player Martina Navratilova and basketball player Sheryl Swoopes. Entertainers who have performed on Olivia cruises include the Indigo Girls and Margaret Cho.

The company was involved in mild controversy in 1998 when its attempt to buy an ad on the sitcom Ellen's anticipated "coming out" episode was rejected by ABC.

== See also ==
- Gay marketing
- List of gay villages
- R Family Vacations for LGBT families.
- Racquet Club of Palm Springs – a defunct tennis club now owned by Olivia Communities
