= Olivia Records =

Women's record label

Olivia Records Inc.
- Parent company: Olivia
- Founded: 1973
- Status: California corporation since 1975
- Genre: Women's music
- Country of origin: United States

Olivia Records is a record label founded in 1973 in Washington D.C. which centers female musicians. Its founders included prominent lesbian figures Ginny Berson, Meg Christian, Judy Dlugacz, Jennifer Woodul, Kate Winter and five others. Olivia Records sold two million records and produced about 40 albums during its twenty years of operation.

== History ==
A lesbian feminist movement emerged in the 1970s that reacted to the discrimination of women within the gay rights and counterculture movements, and heteronormativity embedded in the 1960s US feminist movement. Women's music labels such as Olivia contributed to a 1970s lesbian sub-culture by providing a public platform for the expression of topics that were lacking in dominant political discourse, and helped consumers develop strategies to cope with, organize, and articulate their experiences. Cris Williamson encouraged the Olivia collective to use an independent music label as an economic base for lesbian social organizing.

=== Foundation ===
First called the "Olivia Collective", the group that founded the record label named itself and the label after the heroine of a novel by Dorothy Bussy, who fell in love with her headmistress at French boarding school. The heroine and the novel were both called Olivia. The founders—Ginny Berson, Meg Christian, Judy Dlugacz, Jennifer Woodul, Kate Winter and five other women—borrowed $4,000 to form the record label.

Christian and Cris Williamson were the two best-selling artists signed to Olivia Records. In 1973, the collective released a 45 record with Christian's song "Lady" on one side and Williamson's "If It Weren't for the Music" on the other. The single sold for $1.50, plus mailing costs. Yoko Ono responded and said that she wanted to do a side project with Olivia, but the collective politely declined. Without making themselves dependent on any high-profile person, they made $12,000 with the single, which was enough to release Christian's first album, I Know You Know in 1974, and a year later, Williamson's groundbreaking album The Changer and the Changed. I Know You Know sold over ten thousand copies in its first year, and eventually sold over 70,000 copies for Olivia Records, while The Changer and the Changed became one of the top-selling albums on any independent label.

=== Move to California ===
In 1974, Judy Dlugacz, Meg Christian, Ginny Berson, Jennifer Woodhul, and Kate Winter relocated the company from Washington D.C. to California. But Olivia's business philosophy ultimately contributed to financial problems and internal conflicts among staff and artists contributed to its restructuring and ultimate demise.

Olivia Records echoed the philosophy cultural production of lesbian feminist separatists. But although Olivia Records claimed to benefit all women, the business was primarily led and promoted the interests of white middle-class American lesbians. In the late 1970s, Olivia expanded in inclusivity by promoting the music of African American artists Linda Tillery and Mary Watkins. In 1977, after attacks on municipal gay rights ordinances spearheaded by Anita Bryant, Olivia put out Lesbian Concentrate, a collection of songs and poetry with part of the proceeds going to benefit the Lesbian Mothers National Defense Fund. Included on the 13 track LP was Meg Christian's "Ode To A Gym Teacher" and Sue Fink's "Leaping Lesbians".

Sandy Stone was Olivia's sound engineer from ca. 1976-1978, recording and mixing all Olivia product during this period. She resigned as the controversy over her working for a lesbian-identified enterprise increased because she was a transgender woman.

=== Decline ===
Following a sold-out tenth-anniversary best-of concert at Carnegie Hall in New York City, Olivia's idealist and inexperienced business practices led to significant financial hardship. Meg Christian left the record label in 1984. Olivia moved first to Los Angeles in 1975 to stay on top of the burgeoning music scene and then to Oakland in 1977. The remaining five women of the collective, who had been pooling their money and even living together for the previous seven years, began to disperse. Olivia stopped putting out new records and instead performed a series of 15th anniversary concerts in 1988. The two 15th-anniversary concerts at Carnegie Hall were the largest grossing concerts at that venue in its history. In 1988, the record label restructured and morphed into a broader women-centered social business venture resulted in the branding of Olivia, a lesbian travel company.

Even though Olivia Records released world music and salsa records, it was most successful with acoustic solo acts, although sometimes it failed to identify mainstream talent. In 1985, singer/songwriter Melissa Etheridge, then a struggling Los Angeles artist, sent her demo to Olivia, but was ultimately rejected. Etheridge went on to become one of the most popular female performers of the 1990s and arguably the most successful lesbian musician of all time. She saved the rejection letter, signed by "the women of Olivia," which was featured in Intimate Portrait, the Lifetime Television documentary of her life.

Olivia Records was unable to adapt to the evolving musical landscape for women—from the Riot grrrl movement to Lilith Fair and the rise of Ani DiFranco—and consequently could no longer sustain operations as a record label.

== Philosophy ==
Olivia Records promoted music that validated women's and lesbian's experiences, including lyrical and musical expressions of love, anger, fear, and humor. Lyrics by artists on Olivia Records frequently described personal or local problems rather than address global women's issues. Fans bonded to the musicians and to each other, thus forming women-centered musical communities. Early interviews with the founders of Olivia Records show an acute awareness of the radical political message embedded in the very creation of the label. In an August 1974 interview about the creation of Olivia Records, Ginny Berson, Meg Christian, Judy Dlugacz, Cyndi Gair and Helaine Harris described the label as a new national women's recording company. In this interview, Meg Christian described Olivia Records as a form of lobbying, and Judy Dlugacz directly tied the label to the broader women's movement. Ginny Berson explained their vision for women to gain social power and capital by creating alternative economic institutions that would enable women to control their own economic situation. She identified the fastest way to eliminate oppressive/discriminating/harassing workplaces as by employing women, promoting women, and investing women's money in women.

The economic philosophy and business operations that differentiated Olivia Records from mainstream records reflected the idealistic hopes of its founders, and the label's executives revelled in experimenting with unknown artists and inexperienced producers. As an independent label, Olivia Records cultivated a fan base through music festivals, coffee houses and bookstores, and mail order catalogs. Similar to women's music festivals, Olivia Records favored apprenticeship and mentoring as staple organizational practices. The founders of Olivia Records were not the only LGBTQ activists to criticize American capitalism or consumerism, and many subculture bars, bookstores, coffee shops, and presses were created to carve out physical and intellectual queer spaces in the American marketplace. The DIY aesthetic of Olivia Records mirrored broader trends that proliferated in the American lesbian arts and counter-marketplace during the 1970s and 80s, including the rejection of mass-production and big corporations in favor of crafts, folk art, and preindustrial production techniques. Similarly, lesbians were valuing alternative forms of commerce, including gifting and trading. Lesbians were reclaiming handmade objects and domestic products, and the rise of acoustic folk music was an offshoot of all of these trends.

== Impact ==
Cris Williamson and Judy Dlugacz were awarded the 2018 Jack Emerson Lifetime Achievement Award for Executive by the Americana Music Association.

== Artists ==
- Margie Adam
- Gwen Avery
- Alicia Bridges
- Joanna Cazden
- Meg Christian
- Casse Culver
- Dianne Davidson
- Sue Fink
- Tret Fure
- Kay Gardner
- Judy Grahn
- Barbara Higbie
- Leslie Ann Jones
- BeBe K'Roche
- Deidre McCalla
- June Millington
- Pat Parker
- Woody Simmons
- Linda Tillery
- Lucie Blue Tremblay
- Teresa Trull
- Robin Tyler
- Nancy Vogl
- Mary Watkins
- Cris Williamson
