= GLQ (journal) =

- Discipline: Queer studies
- Language: English
- Edited by: Chandan Reddy, C. Riley Snorton

Publication details
- History: 1993 to present
- Publisher: Duke University Press
- Frequency: Quarterly

Standard abbreviations
- ISO 4: GLQ

Indexing
- ISSN: 1064-2684 (print); 1527-9375 (web)

Links
- Journal homepage

GLQ: A Journal of Lesbian and Gay Studies is a scholarly, peer-reviewed journal based published by Duke University Press. It was co-founded by David M. Halperin and Carolyn Dinshaw in the early 1990s. In its mission, the journal seeks "to offer queer perspectives on all issues touching on sex and sexuality." It covers religion, science studies, politics, law, and literary studies.

The current editors are Chandan Reddy, Associate Professor of Gender, Women and Sexuality Studies at the University of Washington, and C. Riley Snorton, Professor of English Language and Literature at the University of Chicago.

In a retrospective article for the twenty-fifth anniversary issue, co-founder Halperin wrote of the journal's founding:

Like every good idea I have ever had, the idea of founding GLQ did not originate with me. It was proposed to me early in 1991 by Philip Rappaport, who was working at the time as an acquisitions editor at Gordon and Breach and who was looking for ways to make his job more interesting—specifically by taking account of emerging work in lesbian and gay studies. Philip approached me about the possibility of starting an academic journal, and although I thought it was a terrific idea, I didn’t feel that I could take on such an ambitious project. But I did mention Philip’s proposal, some time later, to Carolyn Dinshaw, whom I had recently met, and she expressed immediate enthusiasm for it. I told her that if she would be willing to do it with me, I would gladly agree to it. She accepted. I got back in touch with Philip. The rest is history.

GLQ was acquired by Duke University Press from Gordon and Breach in 1997 after Gordon and Breach refused to print an article selected by the editors. Gordon and Breach had offices in Malaysia, and Malaysian officials has recently objected to an article in GLQ with anti-Islamic imagery.

At the 2011 Modern Language Association convention, GLQ received the 2010 Special Issue Prize from the Council of Editors of Learned Journals for its "Sexuality, Nationality, Indigeneity" issue, which covered LGBT Native American topics.

== See also ==
- List of LGBT publications
- Journal of Lesbian Studies
