= Radicalesbians =

Group of lesbian feminist organizations

"Radicalesbians" were several lesbian feminist organizations founded in the post-Stonewall period of gay activism. The first, most well-known of these groups was founded in New York City, and was short-lived, though their impact was not: the manifesto the group distributed during their protest, titled "The Woman-Identified Woman," came to be known as one of the foundational documents of lesbian feminism.

Following the first group in New York City, other groups known as "Radicalesbians" arose elsewhere. The Philadelphia Radicalesbians were explicitly connected to the New York City group, and some of the membership overlapped. However, another group of Radicalesbians in Australia also formed in the 1970s, unrelated to the United States groups, but motivated by similar concerns of misogyny and homophobia.

== Historical context ==
In the 1960s, both women's liberation and gay liberation movements in the United States were amassing increasing levels of support. Yet, some lesbian women of this time period were feeling excluded from both movements.

In response to misogyny from the men of gay liberation organizations such as the New York City Gay Liberation Front, lesbians began to form their own, distinctive groups. They also held their own events, beginning with their first women's dance on April 3, 1970. Similarly, lesbian women often found themselves on the margins of women's groups due to their sexuality. This issue was exacerbated by comments from Betty Friedan, then-leader of the National Organization for Women (NOW), who referred to lesbians as a "lavender menace" to the women's movement in 1969. Then, in March 1970, Susan Brownmiller's article "Sisterhood is Powerful" (published in The New York Times) referred to lesbians as a "lavender herring." While Brownmiller's comment has since been characterized as her "attempting to make a joke and dissociate from Friedan’s views," it was clear that "some activists did not see the humor in it, and instead saw it as a comment on lesbians’ insignificance in the march toward women’s rights."

In New York City, the frustration some lesbian women felt at this time led to one group of women deciding it was time to take action, and they formed a temporary group to protest the Second Congress to Unite Women on May 1, 1970.

=== Second Congress to Unite Women ===
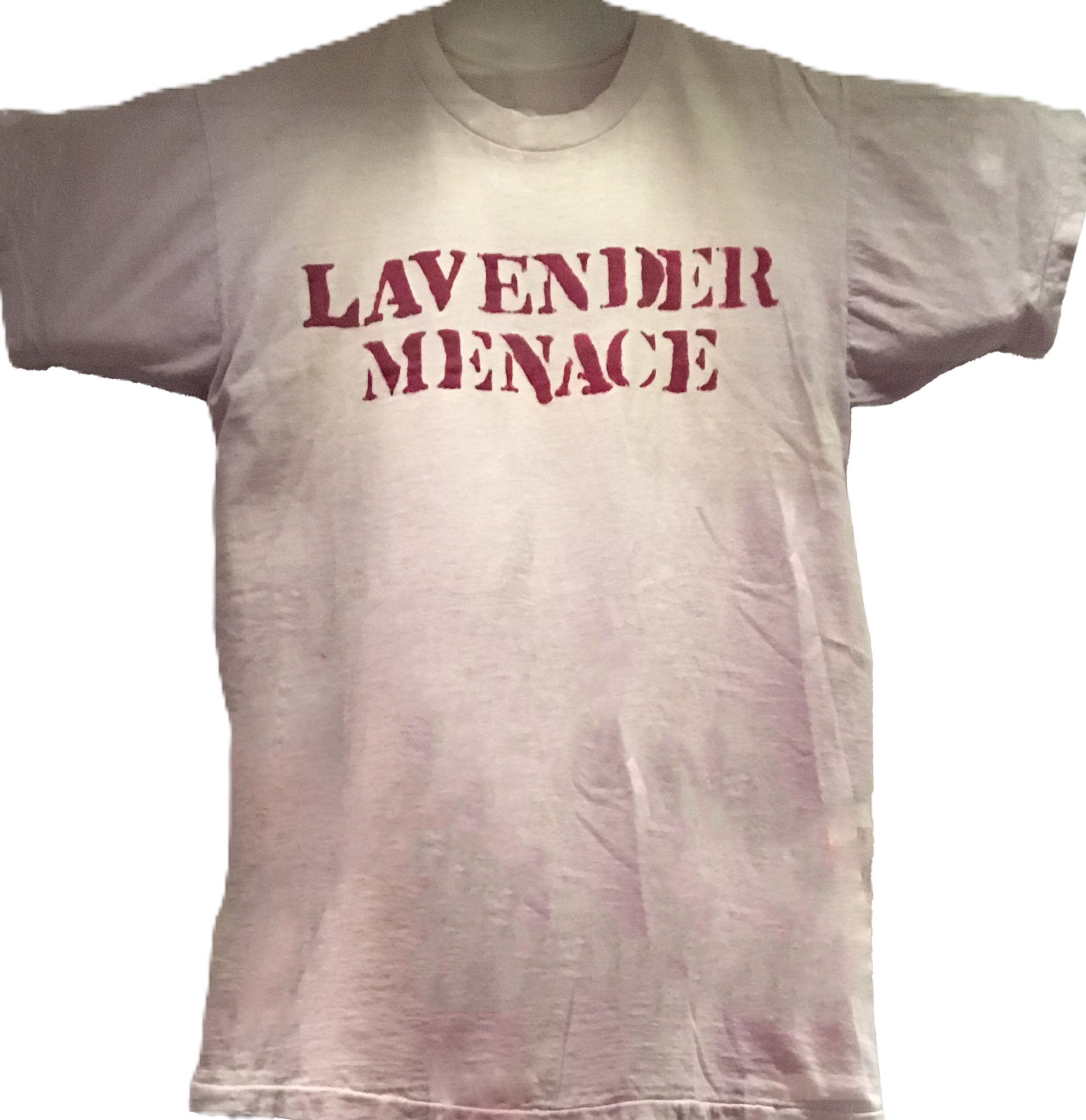
A "Lavender Menace" t-shirt from the NYC protest, (donated to the Lesbian Herstory Archives in Brooklyn, NYC).

Around 7pm, during the conference's opening session (led by author Kate Millett), the women began their zap. One newsletter after the event recalled: "The lights went out, people heard running, laughter, a rebel yell here and there, and when the lights were turned back on, those same 300 women found themselves in the hands of the LAVENDER MENACE."

The women sported t-shirts they had designed themselves, featuring the words "Lavender Menace" across the front. Some of the women took to the stage and "announced their intention to discuss lesbian issues." Members of the group who had remained seated stood to reveal their own "Lavender Menace" shirts and voice their support.

The group had anticipated resistance (though Millet encouraged the zap), but they were pleasantly surprised as the conversation was actually welcomed. The remaining two days of the Congress became dedicated to discussions, debates, and workshops about lesbian issues and their needs from other women in the movement.

== Ideology ==
In their manifesto, the Radicalesbians defined their importance to the feminist movement and recontextualized lesbianism as a political movement. The manifesto centered on the concept of the "Woman-Identified Woman;" the idea that women can only achieve liberation through detaching from male-dominated classifications and instead defining themselves in relation to other women. They argued that the hegemony of patriarchy had internalized sexism into women's perceptions of themselves, and only by being given a new sense of self from identifying with other women could women escape their oppression.

The manifesto was also directly in conversation with the policies of NOW, where the documents were distributed. The Radicalesbians criticized the exclusionary policies that had originally pushed their sexuality out of the discussion, and identified the importance of the total unity between women against male oppression. They argued against moderate policies of passive opposition and lobbying for gradual legislative change, instead supporting radical departure from male-dominated society.

The Radicalesbians argued that concepts of sexuality were oppressive social constructs imposed by a patriarchal society. They stated that a sexual norm was inexorable from the oppression of women, and that a truly equally society would see sexual freedom and the disappearance of homosexuality and heterosexuality as labels.

== United States ==
US-based Radicalesbians chapters continued to organize for lesbian-feminism after the May 1970 action.

=== New York City group ===
The NYC-based women who had organized the protest began to hold consciousness-raising groups for women of all sexualities. They also took on a name, abandoning their prior label of "Gay Liberation Front Women." and the "Lavender Menace" (the title of their demonstration). They first experimented with the name Lesbian Liberation, then adopted their better-known name, Radicalesbians. Despite the changes, Radicalesbians of NYC is sometimes still mistakenly referred to as "Lavender Menace," given it was that demonstration that is typically considered the catalyst for the Radicalesbians group and the rapid growth in lesbian-feminist thought.

==== Known members ====
There is not a full list of the membership of the NYC Radicalesbians, but many of its members have written about their participation and thus made their connections public. Some known members of the group include:

- Arlene Kushner
- Artemis March
- Barbara Love
- Cynthia Funk
- Ellen Broidy
- Ellen Shumsky
- Karla Jay
- Lois Hart
- Martha Shelley
- Michela Griffon
- Rita Mae Brown

==== Dissolution of New York group ====
In an effort to avoid unjust, "patriarchal 'leadership hierarchies' that would allow individual women to exert undue influence on the group," the group adopted a lot system that ensured responsibilities were spread around, allowing all women to participate in each role. Though this method showed some promise, over time, some women were routinely taking on leadership roles in an unofficial capacity due to their perceived expertise or experience. This led to some women feeling like they were unable to participate equally.

Other women criticized the group for a lack of direct action. Those who sought a more active role in the lesbian-feminist movement eventually began to turn elsewhere.

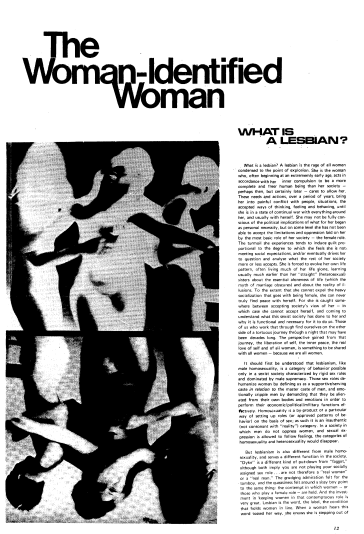
The Radicalesbians' manifesto, as seen reprinted in the Gay Liberation Front newsletter for June/July 1970.

==== Legacy ====
The Congress where the women held their initial protest was in Manhattan, in the building known today as New York City Lab School for Collaborative Studies; the site is recognized by the NYC LGBT Historic Sites Project as a historic location.

Their manifesto, "The Woman-Identified Woman," introduced a new way to discuss lesbianism that diverged from the pathologizing definitions in psychology at the time.

=== Philadelphia ===
In Philadelphia, Pennsylvania, another Radicalesbians group began in 1971. Some of the women in this chapter had experiences in the NYC chapter, and therefore wanted to avoid the problems that led to the NYC group's dissolution. Philadelphia Radicalesbians "focused on the meaningful connections between and among women in consciousness-raising groups and small direct actions," trying to maintain a greater sense of community than what existed in their NYC counterpart.

== Australia ==
In the 1970s, tensions between lesbian women and the mainstream gay rights movement, mirroring those in the US, were rising in Australia. By 1972, lesbian women were forming their own groups, separate from mixed-gender groups.

=== The Sorrento Conference (1973) ===
In July 1973, Australian lesbian-feminists held their first conference, nicknamed the "Sorrento Conference" as it was held at the Whitehall Guest House in Sorrento, Australia. This initial conference allowed lesbian feminists of Australia their first organized effort at defining "what a lesbian is, what she could be and what we could do about it."

== See also ==
- Lesbian Avengers
- Lesbian history
- Radical feminism
- Redstockings
