= List of feminist periodicals in the United States =

This is a list of feminist periodicals in the United States. A feminist periodical is a journal, magazine, or newsletter that primarily publishes content reflecting the ideologies of the Women's Movement. Though interpretations of feminism vary from one periodical to the next, all of these publications aimed to provide a space for women to express their thoughts, ideas, and goals. This list is by no means exhaustive.

Era	Name	Start date	End date	Location	Publisher(s)	Frequency	Notes	Identifier	References
1800s	Advocate and Family Guardian	1835	1941	New York City, New York	New York Female Moral Reform Society; American Female Guardian Society	Semi-monthly		OCLC 30552324	
1800s	The Una	1853	1855	Boston, Massachusetts					
1800s	Woman's Journal	1870	1931	Boston, Massachusetts		Weekly		OCLC 7383821	
1800s	American Association of University Women Outlook	1884	Active	Washington D.C.	American Association of University Women	3 times a year		ISSN 0001-0278, 1044-5706, 0161-5661	
The American Jewess	1895	1899	Chicago, Illinois			The first English-language periodical published for American Jewish women.	OCLC 5782568		
1900s	The Socialist Woman	1907	1914	Chicago, Illinois	The Socialist Woman Publishing Co.	Monthly			
1900s	Women in Music	1935	1940	New York, New York				OCLC 15728633	
1950s	The Ladder	1956	1972	Los Angeles, California	Daughters of Bilitis	Monthly, later Bimonthly	The first nationally distributed lesbian publication in the United States.	ISSN 0023-7108 OCLC 1037547553	
1960s	Aphra	1969	1976	New York, New York			A literary magazine. They published poetry, fiction, and various articles on the arts. Issues were frequently themed.	ISSN 0003-6447 OCLC 1481674, 187448726	
1960s	Focus: A Journal for Gay Women	1969	1983	Boston, Massachusetts	Boston Daughters of Bilitis.	Monthly/Bi-Monthly	A literary review for gay women.	OCLC 2261157	
	Women: A Journal of Liberation	1969	1983	Baltimore, Maryland	Women: A Journal of Liberation	Quarterly	A political and cultural journal.	ISSN 0043-7433OCLC 1250191222	
1970s	Off Our Backs	1970	2008	Washington D.C.	off our backs, inc.	Bimonthly	The longest surviving feminist newspaper in the United States.	ISSN 0030-0071 OCLC 1038241	
1970s	Ain't I A Woman?	1970	1971	Iowa City, Iowa	AIAW Collective / Iowa City Women's Liberation Front Publications Collective	Monthly	Feminist art and politics.	ISSN 0044-6939 OCLC 2221525	
1970s	Best Friends	1971	Unknown	Albuquerque, N.M.	Best Friends Poetry Collective	Less than quarterly	A women's poetry magazine.	OCLC 1001234876	
1970s	Black Maria	1971		Chicago, Illinois	Black Maria Collective Inc.	Annual	A feminist journal of art and politics.	ISSN 0045-222X OCLC 2786249	
1970s	Earth's Daughters	1971	Active	Buffalo, New York	Earth's Daughters	3 times a year	A feminist literary and art periodical.	ISSN 0163-0989	
1970s	The Lesbian Tide	1971	1980	Los Angeles, California	Tide Collective	Bi-monthly	The first national lesbian newspaper. Also, the first American magazine to use the word "lesbian" in its title.	ISSN 0270-8167OCLC 1167128712, 941667492, 917541844	
1970s	Moving Out	1971		Detroit, Michigan	Moving Out Collective	Irregular	A feminist literary & arts journal.	ISSN 0047-830X	
1970s	The Second Wave: A Magazine of the New Feminism	1971	1983	Cambridge, Massachusetts	Second Wave	Quarterly	A political periodical. Also published "many pages of poetry, fiction, book reviews and art."	ISSN 0048-9980 OCLC 2267579	
1970s	The Amazon	1972	1984	Milwaukee, Wisconsin	Amazon	6 times a year	A journal for midwestern women.	OCLC 2045999, 1000824023ISSN 2381-0718	
1970s	Amazon Quarterly	1972	1975	Oakland, California	Amazon Press	Quarterly	A lesbian feminist arts journal.	OCLC 2750571	
1970s	Country Women	1972	1979	Albion, California	Country Women Publications		A feminist country survival manual and a creative journal.	ISSN 0199-1361 OCLC 3804478	
1970s	The Feminist Art Journal	1972	1977	New York	Feminist Art Journal, Inc.	Quarterly		ISSN 0300-7014 OCLC 0300-7014	
1970s	Feminist Studies	1972	Active	College Park, Maryland	Feminist Studies, Inc.	3 times a year	An independent, nonprofit peer-reviewed academic journal.	ISSN 0046-3663, 2153-3873OCLC 38966895	
1970s	Media Report To Women	1972	Active	Washington, D.C.	Communication Research Associates, Inc.	Quarterly	A journal about what women are doing and thinking about communications media.	ISSN 0145-9651OCLC 476239773	
1970s	Ms.	1972	Active	Virginia	Liberty Media for Women, L.L.C.	Quarterly	Typically credited as "the first national feminist magazine" for being the first mainstream feminist publication.	ISSN 0047-8318 OCLC 671775389	
1970s	New Directions for Women	1972	1983	Dover, New Jersey	Paula Kassell	Quarterly	A feminist newspaper.	ISSN 0160-1075OCLC 3617120	
1970s	Women & Film	1972	1976	California	Women and Film	3 times a year	The first known feminist film magazine in the US.	ISSN 0049-7797	
1970s	13th Moon	1973	Active	New York	13th Moon, Inc.	Annual	A feminist literary magazine founded Ellen Marie Bissert	ISSN 0094-3320 OCLC 1165759346	
1970s	Big Mama Rag	1973	1984	Denver, Colorado	Big Mama Rag, Inc.	Monthly	A feminist newsjournal.	ISSN 0277-7533OCLC 23201144	
1970s	Dykes & Gorgons	1973	1976	Berkeley, California	Dykes & Gorgons			ISSN 2573-6183 OCLC 951615724, 55515875;	
1970s	Gravida	1973	19??	New York	Gravida, Ltd.	Quarterly	A literary and poetry journal.	ISSN 0191-0760OCLC 612072421	
1970s	The Lesbian Feminist	1973		New York, New York	The Lesbian Feminist Liberation	Monthly	Both a newsletter and a political journal. They published personal and political analyses of lesbian feminist experience.	OCLC 63149145	
1970s	Albatross	1974	1980	East Orange, New Jersey	Albatross Collective	Bi-monthly	A radical-lesbian-feminist magazine.	OCLC 8740582	
1970s	Chomo-Uri	1974	1979	Amherst, Massachusetts	Chomo Uri Collective	3 times a year	A "women's multi-art magazine."	ISSN 0190-4736OCLC 1051603856	
1970s	Dark Horse	1974	19??	Cambridge, Massachusetts	Dark Horse Poets, Inc.	Quarterly	"Boston's first poetry and fiction newspaper."	OCLC 2943336	
1970s	Exponent II	1974	2007	Arlington, Massachusetts	Exponent II, Inc.	Quarterly	The longest-running independent publication for Latter-day Saint women.	ISSN 1094-7760	
1970s	Jump Cut	1974	Active	Berkeley, California	Jump Cut Associates	Annual	"A Review of Contemporary Media"	ISSN 0146-5546OCLC 2971578	
1970s	Lesbian Connection	1974	Active	East Lansing, Michigan	Elsie Publishing Institute	Bimonthly	"The free worldwide forum of news & ideas for, by and about lesbians."	ISSN 1081-3217 OCLC 10734023	
1970s	Lesbian Voices	1974		San Jose, California	Lesbian Voices	Quarterly	A literary and cultural journal. Edited by Rosalie Nichols.	OCLC 222412119	
1970s	Paid My Dues: Journal of Women and Music	1974	1980	Milwaukee, Wisconsin; Chicago, Illinois	Woman's Soul Publishing; Calliope Publishing, Inc.	Irregular		ISSN 0097-8035	
1970s	Quest: A Feminist Quarterly	1974	1982	Washington D.C.	Quest			ISSN 0098-955X OCLC 2242837	
1970s	Radical History Review	1974	Active	Durham, North Carolina	Duke University Press	3 times a year	A scholarly journal.	ISSN 0163-6545, 1534-1453OCLC 985576992	
1970s	Sibyl-Child	1974		Hyattsville, Maryland	Sibyl-Child Press, Inc.	3 times a year	A Women's Arts and Culture Journal.	ISSN 0161-715X	
1970s	So's Your Old Lady	1974	1979	Minneapolis, Minnesota	Haymarket Press	Bi-monthly	A Lesbian and Feminist Journal	OCLC 917556863	
1970s	Sunbury	1974	1981	New York, New York	Sunbury Press			ISSN 0271-3217 OCLC 1000821142	
1970s	Gibbous Rising	1977	????	Sacramento, California	Gibbous Rising	Irregular	Feminist News Journal	OCLC ocn952386352	
1970s	Women & Literature	1974	1988	New York, New York; New Brunswick, New Jersey	Holmes & Meier Publishers	Irregular	A feminist scholarly journal founded by Janet Margaret Todd. Formerly known as Mary Wollstonecraft Newsletter (until 1974) and Mary Wollstonecraft Journal (until 1975)	ISSN 0147-1759	
1970s	DYKE: A Quarterly	1975	1978	New York	Tomato Publications Ltd.; Liza Cowan and Penny House	Quarterly	A magazine by and about lesbian separatists. DYKE was an all woman publication.	ISSN 2573-4741OCLC 951614810	
1970s	Fighting Woman News	1975	199?	New York, New York	Spectrum Resources	Quarterly		ISSN 0146-8812 OCLC 3054837	
1970s	Frontiers: A Journal of Women Studies	1975	Active	Lincoln, Nebraska	University of Nebraska Press	3 times a year	One of the earliest and longest-running publications on feminist and gender studies in the US.	ISSN 0160-9009, 1536-0334 OCLC 642530710, 909782314	
1970s	Gilt Edge	1975	1977	Missoula, Montana	Women's Resource Center; University of Montana	Annually?	A magazine of artists who are women	OCLC 42302751	
1970s	Primavera	1975	2006	Chicago, Illinois	Salsedo Press	Annual	A feminist magazine that focused on women's experiences.	ISSN 0364-7609 OCLC 1078795375	
1970s	Radical Teacher	1975	Active	Pittsburgh, Pennsylvania	University of Pittsburgh. University Library System	3 times a year		ISSN 1941-0832 (web); ISSN 0191-4847 (print)	
1970s	Signs	1975	Active	Chicago, Illinois	University of Chicago Press	Quarterly	"A Journal of Women in Culture and Society." A peer-reviewed feminist academic journal.	ISSN 0097-9740OCLC 21629549	
1970s	Sojourner: The Women's Forum	1975	2002	Cambridge, Massachusetts	Sojourner, Inc.	Monthly	A feminist periodical founded by a group of women from MIT.	ISSN 0191-8699 OCLC 4656277	
1970s	Women Artist News	1975	1998	New York, New York	Midmarch Arts Press	Annual			
1970s	Women talking, Women Listening	1975	19??	Dublin, California	Women Talking, Women Listening Press	Annually	Published women's poetry.	OCLC 5696938	
1970s	Women's International Network News	1975	2002	Lexington, Massachusetts	Women's International Networks			ISSN 0145-7985	
1970s	Calyx	1976		Corvallis, Oregon	Calyx, Inc.	3 times a year	A literary and art magazine dedicated to publishing the voices of women in the Northwest.	ISSN 0147-1627	
1970s	Camera Obscura	1976	Active	Durham, North Carolina	Duke University Press	3 times a year	A journal of feminism, culture, and media studies.	ISSN 0270-5346	
1970s	Equal Times	1976	1984	Boston, Chicago	Equal Times	Weekly	A feminist newspaper from Boston that wrote on equal pay and jobs for women.	OCLC 15158516	
1970s	Houston Breakthrough	1976	1981	Houston, Texas	Breakthrough Publishing Co.	Monthly			
1970s	Lady-Unique-Inclination-of-the-Night	1976	1983	New Brunswick, New Jersey	Sowing Circle Press	Annual (issues were referred to as "cycles")	A journal of feminist art, history, and performance with a particular focus on women's spirituality)	OCLC 5348640	
1970s	Lilith	1976	Active	New York, New York	Lilith Publications, Inc.	Quarterly	A Jewish Women's Quarterly.	ISSN 0146-2334	
1970s	Sinister Wisdom	1976	Active	Charlotte, North Carolina; Lincoln, Nebraska; Berkeley and Oakland, California	Sinister Wisdom, Inc.	3 times a year	The longest operating lesbian journal to date.	ISSN 0196-1853 OCLC 3451636	
1970s	Through the Looking Glass	1976	19??	Seattle, Washington	Through the Looking Glass	Quarterly	A women's and children's prison newsletter.	OCLC 952387485, 7448204	
1970s	Womanart	1976	1978	New York, New York	Womanart Enterprises	Quarterly		OCLC 2531831	
1970s	Women's Agenda	1976	1979	New York, New York	Women's Action Alliance, Inc.	Monthly or 10 a year	A politically radical magazine for women activists.	ISSN 0149-0532	
1970s	WREE - View of Women	1976	19??	Grand Rapids, Michigan	Women for Racial and Economic Equality	Quarterly	A political newsletter.	ISSN 0892-3116OCLC 25792491	
1970s	Auntie Bellum: A New South Carolina Journal for Women	1977		Columbia, South Carolina		Quarterly	"Includes articles, profiles of outstanding women, poetry, reviews, with emphasis on regional interests and writers."	OCLC 4815152	
1970s	Azalea: A Magazine by Third World Lesbians	1977	1983				A quarterly magazine for Black, Latina, Asian, and Native American lesbians.	OCLC 919005098	
1970s	The Bright Medusa	1977	Unknown	Berkeley, California	Bright Medusa	Quarterly	A feminist literary journal.	OCLC 4139314	
1970s	Chrysalis	1977	1980	Los Angeles, California	Chrysalis	Quarterly		ISSN 0197-1867 OCLC 3128311	
1970s	Conditions	1977	1990	Brooklyn, New York	Conditions, Inc.	Annual	A lesbian feminist literary magazine.	ISSN 2381-5620OCLC 646884046	
1970s	Feminist Japan	1977	Unknown	Tokyo, Japan; New York		Bimonthly	A Japanese feminist magazine.	OCLC 16104584	
1970s	The Creative Woman	1977	1992	Illinois	Governors State University	Quarterly		ISSN 0736-4733 OCLC 698137157	
Gaysweek	1977	1979	New York, New York	New York Gay News, Inc.	Weekly	Has been considered New York City's first mainstream gay and lesbian newspaper.	ISSN 0145-9104 OCLC 62387609		
Heresies	1977	1993	New York, New York	Heresies Collective	Irregular	A feminist art and politics journal.	ISSN 0146-3411 OCLC 818922604		
	WomaNews	1979	Unknown	Gainesville, Florida; New York, New York	WomaNews Collective	Monthly	A radical feminist newspaper.	OCLC 11483997	
1980s	Gender Issues	1980	Active	New York, New York	Springer New York LLC	Quarterly	A feminist academic journal.	ISSN 1098-092XOCLC 49644179	
1980s	Maenad	1980		Gloucester, Massachusetts	Maenad Ltd.	Quarterly	A women's literary journal.	ISSN 0275-5629	
1980s	Woman's Art Journal	1980	Active		Old City Publishing, Inc.	Biannually	A feminist art history journal	ISSN 0270-7993 OCLC 6497852	
1980s	Womyn's Braille Press	1980	1996		Womyn's Braille Press	Irregular	A feminist organization that was operated by blind women. They circulated a newsletter for twelve years.		
1980s	Blatant Image	1981	1983	Oregon	Blatant Image	Annual		ISSN 0277-8181 OCLC 7627805	
1980s	Common Lives - Lesbian Lives	1981	1996	Iowa		Quarterly		ISSN 0891-6969 OCLC 8234014	
1980s	Frontiers	1981	2016	Southern California	Michael Turner	Weekly	Frontiers was Southern California's oldest and largest LGBT magazine.		
1980s	Onyx: Black Lesbian Newsletter	1982		Berkeley, California		Bimonthly		OCLC 69262012	
1980s	Trivia: Voices of Feminism	1982	Active	Amherst, Massachusetts	Trivia	Semi-annually		ISSN 2166-9082, 0736-928X	
1980s	Tulsa Studies in Women's Literature	1982	Active	Tulsa, Oklahoma	University of Tulsa	Semi-Annually		ISSN 0732-7730	
1980s	Bi Women Quarterly	1983	Active	Boston, Massachusetts		Quarterly			
1980s	Hurricane Alice	1983	1998	Rhode Island	Hurrican Alice	Quarterly		ISSN 0882-7907	
1980s	Women & Performance	1983	Active	New York	Routledge	3 times a year	A journal of feminist theory.	ISSN 0740-770X	
1980s	Backbone: A Journal of Women's Literature	1984	1988	Seattle, Washington	Backbone Magazine, Inc.	Semi-annual	Originally Seal Press's "Backbone Series."	ISSN 0888-6520	
1980s	Anamika	1985	1987	New York	Anamika Collective			OCLC 61120598	
1980s	Minnesota Women's Press	1985	Active	Minnesota	Minnesota Women's Press, Inc.	Monthly		ISSN 1085-2603	
1980s	M/E/A/N/I/N/G	1986	1997	New York	M/E/A/N/I/N/G	Semi-annually		ISSN 1040-8576	
1990s	Shamakami	1990	1997	San Francisco	Shamakami Collective			ISSN 1084-2446 OCLC 24646926	
1990s	ROCKRGRL	1995	2005	San Mateo, California	ROCKRGRL	Bi-Monthly		ISSN 1086-5985	
1990s	Femspec	1999	Active	Cleveland Heights, Ohio	Femspec	Semi-annually		ISSN 1523-4002	
2000s	LTTR	2001	2006	New York	Printed Matter, Inc.	Annual		ISSN 1935-066X	
2000s	$pread	2005	2011	New York	The Feminist Press	Quarterly			
