= List of lesbian periodicals in the United States =

A timeline of notable lesbian magazines, periodicals, newsletters, and journals in the United States organized by the initial publication date and then title. For a global list, see the list of lesbian periodicals.

Era	Name	Start date	End date	Location	Publishers	Frequency	Notes	Identifier	References
== 1940s–1960s (Before Stonewall riots) ==	Vice Versa (Note: Can be read in full at Queer Music Heritage)	1947	1948	Los Angeles, California	Lisa Ben	Monthly	First documented lesbian periodical in the United States.	OCLC 1624255	
== 1940s–1960s (Before Stonewall riots) ==	The Ladder	1956	1972	San Francisco, California	Daughters of Bilitis	Monthly/bimonth	First widely distributed lesbian periodical in the United States.	ISSN 0023-7108	
== 1940s–1960s (Before Stonewall riots) ==	Daughters of Bilitis–Philadelphia Newsletter	1967	1968	Philadelphia, Pennsylvania	Philadelphia chapter of Daughters of Bilitis				
== 1940s–1960s (Before Stonewall riots) ==	No More Fun and Games (Note: Can be read in full at Reveal Digital's Independent Voices)	1968	1973	Somerville and Cambridge Massachusetts	Cell 16 and Female Liberation	Irregular	Considered by some scholars to be the first lesbian magazine to espouse separatist feminism. Untitled (1968) and titled The Female Slate (1970).	OCLC 2265148	
== 1940s–1960s (Before Stonewall riots) ==	Come Out!	1969	1972	New York City	Gay Liberation Front	Sporadic	One of the newspaper's purposes was to promote lesbian feminism	OCLC 14078148	
== 1940s–1960s (Before Stonewall riots) ==	Maiden Voyage	1969	1970	Boston, Massachusetts	Boston chapter of Daughters of Bilitis	Continues as Focus: A Journal for Gay Women (1971–1983)	OCLC 42316511		
== 1970s ==	Ain't I A Woman	1970	1974	Iowa City, Iowa	AIAW Collective/Iowa City Women's Liberation Front Publications Collective	Twice a month		ISSN 0044-6939OCLC 2221525	
== 1970s ==	off our backs (Note: Can be read in part at Reveal Digital's Independent Voices)	1970	2008	Washington, D.C.	off our backs, inc.			ISSN 0030-0071OCLC 1038241	
== 1970s ==	Sisters: By and For Lesbians (Note: Can be read in full at University of California, Berkeley Libraries here)	1970	1975	San Francisco, California	San Francisco chapter of Daughters of Bilitis	Monthly		ISSN 0049-0644	
== 1970s ==	Amazon: A Midwest Journal for Women	1971	1984	Milwaukee, Wisconsin	Amazon Collective	Monthly (1972–1976), bimonthly (1976–1984)		ISSN 2381-0718	
== 1970s ==	Focus	1971	1983	Boston and Cambridge, Massachusetts	Boston chapter of Daughters of Bilitis		Continues as Maiden Voyage (1969–1971). Subtitled A Journal for Gay Women (1971–1977), A Journal for Lesbians (1977–1983).	OCLC 233599645, 233599608	
== 1970s ==	Killer Dyke	1971	1972	Chicago, Illinois	"Flippies" or the Feminist Lesbian Intergalactic Party	Once a year	Satire magazine	OCLC 25217267, 1000821785	
== 1970s ==	Lavender Vision	1971		Cambridge, Massachusetts				OCLC 2263450	
== 1970s ==	LA DOB Newsletter	1971	1972	Los Angeles, California	Los Angeles chapter of Daughters of Bilitis		Continued as Lesbian Tide (1971–1980)		
== 1970s ==	Lavender Woman	1971	1976	Chicago, Illinois				OCLC 28896850	
== 1970s ==	Lesbian Tide	1971	1980	Los Angeles, California	Jeanne Córdova		Continued as LA DOB Newsletter (1971–1972)	ISSN 0270-8167	
== 1970s ==	Mother	1971		Stanford, California	Mother Publications		Continues as Proud Woman (1972)	OCLC 2264422	
== 1970s ==	Purple Star: Journal of Radicalesbians	1971		Ann Arbor, Michigan	Women's Liberation of Ann Arbor			OCLC 942695178	
== 1970s ==	Reach Out	1971	1972	Detroit, Michigan	Detroit chapter of Daughters of Bilitis			OCLC 2266772, 1000926490	
== 1970s ==	Scarlet Letter	1971	1972	Madison, Wisconsin					
== 1970s ==	Siren: A Journal of Anarcho-Feminism	1971		Chicago, Illinois					
== 1970s ==	Spectre	1971	1972	Ann Arbor, Michigan				OCLC 18917439	
== 1970s ==	Amazon Quarterly	1972	1975	Oakland, California and West Somerville, Massachusetts				OCLC 2750571	
== 1970s ==	ALFA Newsletter	1973	1976	Atlanta, Georgia	Atlanta Lesbian Feminist Alliance		Continues as Atalanta (1977–1994)		
== 1970s ==	Better Homes and Dykes Newsletter of the Lesbian Alliance	1972		Iowa City, Iowa					
== 1970s ==	Echo of Sappho	1972	1973	Brooklyn, New York	Sisters for Liberation			OCLC 2320647	
== 1970s ==	Furies	1972	1973	Washington, D.C.	The Furies Collective			ISSN 0046-5305OCLC 2334944	
== 1970s ==	Lesbians Fight Back	1972		Philadelphia, Pennsylvania					
== 1970s ==	Maine Freewoman's Herald: A Mostly Lesbian Journal	1972		Portland, Maine					
== 1970s ==	National Lesbian Information Service News	1972		San Francisco, California					
== 1970s ==	Portcullis	1972		Los Angeles, California					
== 1970s ==	Purple Rage	1972		NYC					
== 1970s ==	Proud Woman	1972		Stanford, California	Mother Publications		Continues as Mother (1971)	OCLC 25185782	
== 1970s ==	Tres Femmes	1972		San Diego, California					
== 1970s ==	Coming Out Rage	1973		NYC					
== 1970s ==	Cowrie	1973	1974	NYC	Community of Women				
== 1970s ==	Cries from Cassandra	1973		Chicago, Illinois	The Amazon Nation				
== 1970s ==	Desperate Living	1973	1977	Baltimore, Maryland					
== 1970s ==	Dykes and Gorgons	1973		Berkeley, California				OCLC 55515875	
== 1970s ==	Gay Revolution of Women Newsletter	1973	1974	Rochester, New York	Gay Revolution of Women (GROW)		Continues as Women in Sunlight (1974), New Women's Times (1974–1985), and Lesbian Resource Center Newsletter (1974)		
== 1970s ==	The Lesbian Feminist	1973	1979	NYC					
== 1970s ==	Moonstorm	1973	1980	St. Louis, Missouri	Lesbian Alliance of St. Louis, Missouri				
== 1970s ==	Mother Jones Gazette	1973	1974	Knoxville, Tennessee					
== 1970s ==	One-to-One: A Lesbian/Feminist Journal of Communication	1973		NYC					
== 1970s ==	Sapphire	1973		San Francisco, California					
== 1970s ==	So's Your Old Lady	1973	1979	Minneapolis, Minnesota					
== 1970s ==	The Udder Side	1973		NYC					
== 1970s ==	Albatross	1974	1980	East Orange, New Jersey	Albatross Collective		Varied subtitles but usually The Lesbian Feminist Satire Magazine		
== 1970s ==	Lesbian Connection	1974	Present	Michigan	Ambitious Amazons		Free to lesbians everywhere	ISSN 1081-3217	
== 1970s ==	Lesbian Resource Center Newsletter	1974		Rochester, New York			Continues as Gay Revolution of Women Newsletter (1973), Women in Sunlight (1974), and New Women's Times (1974–1985)		
== 1970s ==	Lesbian Voices	1974	1981	San Jose, California					
== 1970s ==	Mom's Apple Pie: Newsletter of the Lesbian Mother's National Defense Fund	1974	1985	Seattle, Washington	Lesbian Mother's National Defense Fund				
== 1970s ==	Purple Cow	1974	1976	Columbus, Ohio					
== 1970s ==	Quest: A Feminist Quarterly	1974	1985				A radical feminist journal.		
== 1970s ==	Satin for Gay Women	1974		San Jose, California					
== 1970s ==	Wicce	1973	1975	Philadelphia, Pennsylvania					
== 1970s ==	WomanSpirit	1974	1984	Wolf Creek, Oregon	Ruth and Jean Mountaingrove		The first lesbian-feminist periodical about spirituality.		
== 1970s ==	Women in Sunlight	1974		Rochester, New York			Continues as Gay Revolution of Women Newsletter (1973), New Women's Times (1974–1985), and Lesbian Resource Center Newsletter (1974)		
== 1970s ==	Dyke: A Quarterly	1975	1978	NYC				OCLC 21506187	
== 1970s ==	Goodbye to All That: A Lesbian Feminist Publication	1975	1977	Austin, Texas	Austin Lesbian Organization		Continues as LesBeFriends		
== 1970s ==	Lesbian-Feminist Union News	1975	1978	Louisville, Kentucky					
== 1970s ==	Lesbian Herstory Archives Newsletter	1975	Present	NYC	Lesbian Herstory Archives			ISSN 1064-0819	
== 1970s ==	The Lesbian Lipservice	1975	1976	Ann Arbor, Michigan					
== 1970s ==	Lesbian News	1975	Present	Los Angeles, California	Jinx Beers (until 1989)	monthly		ISSN 0739-1803	
== 1970s ==	The Lesbian Newsletter	1975		Ann Arbor, Michigan					
== 1970s ==	New Women's Times	1975	1985	Rochester, New York	New Women's Times, Inc.	Monthly	Continues as Gay Revolution of Women Newsletter (1973), Women in Sunlight (1974), and Lesbian Resource Center Newsletter (1974)		
== 1970s ==	Pointblank Times: A Lesbian-Feminist Paper	1975		Houston, Texas					
== 1970s ==	We Got It	1975	1976	Madison, Wisconsin					
== 1970s ==	C A L F A Notes	1976		Cleveland Heights, Ohio	Cleveland Area Lesbian Feminist Alliance (CALFA)				
== 1970s ==	Conditions	1976	1990	Brooklyn, New York			Dedicated to publishing lesbians, specifically working class lesbians and lesbian of color.		
== 1970s ==	Lesbiana Speaks	1976	1977	Miami, Florida					
== 1970s ==	Lesbian Milepost	1976	1977	Anchorage, Alaska			Continues as Klondyke Cuntree (1976), Klondyke Kontact (1977–1980)		
== 1970s ==	Out and About: Seattle Lesbian/Feminist Newsletter	1976	1986	Seattle, Washington					
== 1970s ==	Rubyfruit Reader	1976	1978	Santa Cruz, California					
== 1970s ==	Salsa Soul Sisters/Third World Women's Gay-zette	1976	1985	NYC	Salsa Soul Sisters Third World Wimmin Inc. Collective				
== 1970s ==	Sinister Wisdom	1976	Present	Charlotte, North Carolina; Lincoln, Nebraska; Berkeley and Oakland, California	Catherine Nicholson and Harriet Ellenberger (Desmoines)		Longest surviving lesbian literary journal in the United States.	ISSN 0196-1853OCLC 3451636	
== 1970s ==	Wishing Well	1976		Santa Rosa, California					
== 1970s ==	Atalanta	1977	1994	Atlanta, Georgia	Atlanta Lesbian Feminist Alliance		Continues as ALFA Newsletter (1973–1976)		
== 1970s ==	Azalea: A Magazine by Third World Lesbians	1977	1983	NYC	Salsa Soul Sisters Third World Wimmin Inc. Collective				
== 1970s ==	Changes	1977		Winter Park, Florida	Greater Orlando Lesbian/Feminists				
== 1970s ==	Klondyke Kontact: The Anchorage Lesbian Newsletter	1977	1980	Anchorage, Alaska		Bimonthly	Continued as Lesbian Milepost, Cunni Linguist, and Klondyke Cuntree.		
== 1970s ==	The Leaping Lesbian	1977	1981	Ann Arbor, Michigan		Bimonthly			
== 1970s ==	Lone Star Lesbians	1977	1978	Austin, Texas					
== 1970s ==	Matrices: A Lesbian/Feminist Research Newsletter	1977	1996			Three times a year, irregular			
== 1970s ==	Pearl Diver	1977	1978	Portland, Oregon			A black lesbian magazine		
== 1970s ==	Tribad: A Lesbian Separatist Newsjournal	1977	1979	NYC					
== 1970s ==	Two Dykes & Others: A Texas Lesbian Periodical	1977							
== 1970s ==	Amazon Spirit	1978		Helena, Montana	Montana Amazons Unlimited				
== 1970s ==	Boulder Lesbian Network Newsletter	1978		Boulder, Colorado	Boulder Lesbian Network				
== 1970s ==	Feminary: A Feminist Journal for the South Emphasizing Lesbian Visions	1978	1982	Chapel Hill, North Carolina					
== 1970s ==	Austindyke	1979		Austin, Texas		Monthly			
== 1970s ==	DONT: Dykes Opposed to Nuclear Technology Newsletter	1979		NYC					
== 1970s ==	Lesbians of Color Caucus Quarterly	1979		Seattle, Washington					
== 1980s ==	Associated Lesbians of Puget Sound (ALPS) Newsletter	1980s	2000s						
== 1980s ==	Dyke Diannic Wicca: Newsletter for Biophilic Hags of Magick	1980		Berkeley, California	Artemis				
== 1980s ==	Green Mountain Dyke News	1980		Bennington, Vermont	Green Mountain Dykes				
== 1980s ==	Lesbian Insider, Insighter, Inciter	1980		Minneapolis, Minnesota					
== 1980s ==	The Lunatic Fringe	1980		Chicago, Illinois					
== 1980s ==	Telewoman: A Woman's Newsletter	1980	1983	Pleasant Hill, California					
== 1980s ==	Womyn's Braille Press Newsletter	1980		Minneapolis, Minnesota	Womyn's Braille Press Inc.				
== 1980s ==	Common Lives/Lesbian Lives	1981	1996	Iowa City, Iowa				OCLC 8234014	
== 1980s ==	Lesbian Community News	1981	1987	Lincoln, Nebraska	Lincoln Legion of Lesbians	irregular			
== 1980s ==	Big Apple Dyke News (B.A.D. News)	1981	1988	NYC					
== 1980s ==	(The) Other Black Woman	1981		Jackson Heights, Queens, New York	Committee for the Visibility of the Other Black Woman: The Black Lesbian				
== 1980s ==	Black Lesbian Newsletter	1982		San Francisco, California	San Francisco Women's Center's Black Lesbian Newsletter		Continues as Onyx (1983–1984)		
== 1980s ==	The Celibate Woman: A Journal for Women Who Are Celibate or Considering this Liberating Way of Relating to Others	1982	1988	Washington, D.C.					
== 1980s ==	Dyke Separatist / Amazon Magick	1982		Berkeley, California	Amethyst/Artemis				
== 1980s ==	In the Life: the Newsletter of the June L. Mazer Lesbian Collection	1982	Present	Los Angeles, California	June L. Mazer Lesbian Archives				
== 1980s ==	Maize: A Lesbian Country Magazine (Note: Can be read in part at Julie R. Enzser's Lesbian Poetry Archive)	1982	Present	Minneapolis, Minnesota; Preston-Potter Hollow, New York; Serafina, New Mexico					
== 1980s ==	Woman's Journal-Advocate	1982	1992	Lincoln, Nebraska	The WJ-A collective	Monthly			
== 1980s ==	Lesbian Contradiction	1983	1994					ISSN 1064-4776	
== 1980s ==	Onyx	1983	1984	San Francisco, California	San Francisco Women's Center's Black Lesbian Newsletter		Continued as Black Lesbian Newsletter (1982)		
== 1980s ==	Woman to Woman	1983	1985	Lake Charles, Louisiana	Linda Parks		Free to lesbians and women in prison		
== 1980s ==	Hot Wire: The Journal of Women's Music and Culture (Note: Can be read in full at Hotwire's website)	1984	1994		Toni Armstrong Jr.				
== 1980s ==	Lesbian Ethics	1984		Venice, California	Jeannette Silveira			ISSN 8755-5352	
== 1980s ==	On Our Backs	1984	2006				Lesbian pornographic magazine as a play on off our backs		
== 1980s ==	Asian Lesbians of the East Coast Newsletter	1984		NYC					
== 1980s ==	I Know You Know: Lesbian Views and News	1984	1985?	Indianapolis, Indiana					
== 1980s ==	Lesbian Health Resource Center Newsletter	1985		Durham, North Carolina	Lesbian Health Resource Center (LHRC)				
== 1980s ==	Golden Threads	1985	2016	Demorest, Georgia			Network for older lesbians		
== 1980s ==	WAVELENGTH. A Lesbian Feminist Publication	1985		Seattle, Washington	Groundswell				
== 1980s ==	Hag Rag	1986	1993	Milwaukee, Wisconsin	Intergalactic Lesbian Feminist Press			OCLC 62882091	
== 1980s ==	Yoni: Lesbian Erotica Quarterly	1986		Oakland, California					
== 1980s ==	Visibilities	1987	1991	NYC				ISSN 0892-7375	
== 1980s ==	Dykes, Disability and Stuff: Cause We Always Have Stuff to Share	1988		Madison, Wisconsin; Boston, Massachusetts			For lesbians with disabilities, formats included large print, audio, braille, and electronic.		
== 1980s ==	The L-Word	1988	Present	Bayside, California					
== 1980s ==	Aché: A (Free) Publication for Black Lesbians	1989	1993	Albany and Berkeley, California					
== 1980s ==	1989		Oakland, California						
== 1980s ==	Hikané: The Capable Womon: Disabled Wimmin's Magazine for Lesbians and Our Wimmin Friends	1989		Hillsdale, New York					
== 1980s ==	Tacoma Lesbian Concern (TLC) newsletter	1989	2003	Tacoma, Washington					
== 1990s ==	Old Lesbians Organizing for Change Reporter	1990	Present	Houston, Texas; Athens, Ohio					
== 1990s ==	Girljock	1990	1997	Berkeley, California		Irregular	First lesbian sports periodical.		
== 1990s ==	Shamakami: Forum for South Asian Feminist Lesbians	1990	1997	San Francisco, California					
== 1990s ==	Curve	1991	Present				Continues as Deneuve (1991–1995)		
== 1990s ==	Esto No Tiene Nombre: revista de lesbianas latinas	1991	1994	Miami, Florida					
== 1990s ==	Les Talk: the magazine for empowering lesbians/womyn	1991	1995	St. Louis, Missouri	Rose Publications	monthly	Continues as Kolours: celebrating diversity (1995 Dec - 1997)		
== 1990s ==	Wimmin Magazine	1991							
== 1990s ==	Canswers: The Quarterly Newsletter of the Lesbian Community Cancer Project	1992		Chicago, Illinois					
== 1990s ==	Dykespeak	1993							
== 1990s ==	Lesbian Review of Books: An International Quarterly Review of Books by, for, and about Lesbians	1994	2002	Altadena, California; Hilo, Hawaii				ISSN 1077-5684	
== 1990s ==	Conmoción: An International Latina Lesbian Vision	1995	1996	Miami, Florida					
== 1990s ==	Journal of Lesbian Studies	1997	Present	Binghamton, New York	Haworth Press				
== 1990s ==	Bint el Nas	1998	Present	San Francisco, California			Arab-world identified online magazine		
== 1990s ==	Rain and Thunder: A Radical Feminist Journal of Discussion and Activism	1998	Present	Northampton, Massachusetts			Radical feminism with a lesbian focus.		
== 1990s ==	She Magazine	Feb. 1999	Nov. 2015	Fort Lauderdale, Florida			Longest running magazine for LGBT women in Florida		
== 2000s ==	Go Magazine	2000	Present	NYC			Free		
== 2000s ==	Harrington Lesbian Fiction Quarterly	2000	2005	Binghamton, New York			Continued as Harrington Lesbian Literary Quarterly (2006–2008)		
== 2000s ==	Harrington Lesbian Literary Quarterly	2006	2008				Continued as Harrington Lesbian Fiction Quarterly (2000–2005)		
== 2000s ==	Issues! The Magazine for Lesbians of Color	2000							
== 2000s ==	Jota!	2000		Los Angeles, California			Chicana lesbian poetry review		
== 2000s ==	(el) telarañazo	2000			La telaraña				
== 2000s ==	Velvetpark: Dyke Culture in Bloom	2002	Present	NYC					
	Tagg Magazine	2012	Present	Washington, DC	Eboné Bell	Bi-Monthly	"Everything lesbian, queer, and under the rainbow."		
	EveryQueer	2012	Present	NYC	Meg Ten Eyck	Daily	Emphasizing LGBTQ+ women, transgender and nonbinary people		
	The Sapphic Sun	2024	Present	St. Peterburg, Florida		Monthly	Print only; Focus on archiving daily queer life in Florida and the South		

== Unknown year ==
Name	End date	Location	Publishers	Notes	References
Amazonian		Pioneer Valley, Massachusetts			
Threads Newsletter		NYC	Astrea Lesbian Foundation for Justice		
Carolina Lesbian News		Charlotte, North Carolina			
Island Lesbian Connection		Paia, Hawaii			
Lesbian Lifeline		Daytona Beach, Florida			
Lesbian Visual Artists Newsletter		San Francisco, California			
Lesbians in Colorado		Denver, Colorado			
Lesburbia		Montgomeryville, Pennsylvania			
Dinah: A Monthly Publication of the Lesbian Activist Bureau	1977				
COGS: Coalition of Gay Sisters Newsletter		Columbia, Maryland	Coalition of Gay Sisters		
Amazon Farmers	1977	Fayetteville, Arkansas	Ozark Wimmin on Land		
Moonstorm		St. Louis, Missouri	St. Louis Lesbian Alliance		
Anamika	1985	Brooklyn, New York		Asian American focus	
De Colores: Newsletter of Bay Area Lesbians of Color	1987		San Francisco, California		
A P L Network news	1988	NYC	Asian Pacific Island Lesbian Network (APL)		
Multi-Cultural Jewish Dyke Newsletter	1993?	Huntington, New York			
Women's Central News	1999	Arizona			
G.B.F. Magazine	1990		Hollywood, Los Angeles, California		
Albuquerque Lesbian Rag: A Monthly Lesbian Information and Nonsense Source	1991		Corrales, New Mexico		
Girlfriends	1993	2006			The Girl Guide

== Footnotes ==
=== Sources ===
- Armstrong, David (1985). Trumpet to Arms: Alternative Media in America. South End Press. ISBN 978-0-89608-193-2.
- Armstrong, Elizabeth (2002). Forging Gay Identities. University of Chicago Press. ISBN 978-0-226-02693-0.
- Endres, Kathleen L.; Lueck, Therese L. (1996). Women's Periodicals in the United States: Social and Political Issues. Greenwood Publishing Group. ISBN 9780313286322.
- Faderman, Lillian (1991). Odd Girls and Twilight Lovers. Columbia University Press. ISBN 978-0-231-07488-9.
- Miller, Alan V. (2001). "Our Own Voices: Lesbian & Gay Periodicals 1890s-2000s". Canadian Lesbian and Gay Archives. Archived from the original on February 2, 2009.
- Parkinson, Phil (2003). "Serials List". Lesbian and Gay Archives of New Zealand (LAGANZ).
- Potter, Clare (February 1986). The Lesbian Periodicals Index. Tallahassee, FL: Naiad Press. ISBN 978-0930044749.
- "A Guide to Current Lesbian Periodicals" (PDF). Lesbian Herstory Archives Newsletter. 6. July 1980.
- Glenn, Emily; Shorr, Manya (1998). "The Feminist and Lesbian Periodical Collection". Special Collections and University Archives, University of Oregon Libraries.
- Schwamb, Don (2001). "Gay Media and Media Coverage in the History of the LGBT Community in Milwaukee, Wisconsin". Milwaukee LGBT History Project, Inc.
