= Marilyn Webb =

Marilyn Webb may refer to:

- Marilyn Salzman Webb (born 1942), American activist, author, journalist, and professor
- Marilyn Webb, co-founder of Bethel Heights Vineyard

== See also ==
- Marilynn Webb (1937–2021), New Zealand artist
- Marylyn Webb (1948-2014), British television presenter
