= Woman's Journal-Advocate =

Feminist newspaper in Lincoln, Nebraska, US

- Lincoln's Feminist Newspaper
- Publisher: The WJ-A collective
- Founded: January 1982
- Political alignment: feminist
- Language: English
- Ceased publication: March 1992
- Headquarters: Lincoln, Nebraska

Woman's Journal-Advocate was a feminist newspaper published in Lincoln, Nebraska, from 1982 to 1992. It was created to increase communication among Lincoln's women's and lesbian groups, and to publish and promote artwork and writing by women. Woman's Journal-Advocate was named for two nineteenth-century feminist newspapers, Woman's Journal and The Woman's Advocate.

According to journalist C. J. Janovy, "Lincoln was a hotbed of lesbian political activity" in the time leading up to the newspaper's founding. Some of the newspaper's content advocated political lesbianism and feminist separatism. The newspaper contained reviews of and publicity for lesbian and feminist artists and performers, such as Judy Chicago, and hoped to foster a "Feminist Aesthetic" of distinctively feminist styles in artwork.

The newspaper frequently dealt forcefully with the subjects of rape and domestic violence. It reported on local cases and statistics measuring these crimes, and on volunteer and official responses to them. It aimed for political and social reform, including a greater acceptance of women who respond with violence toward their attackers.

Co-founders of the newspaper include linguist Julia Penelope, journalist Martha Stoddard, and poets Linnea Johnson and Judith Sornberger. The paper printed writing by Helen Longino, Sonia Johnson, Moira Ferguson, Carol Lee Sanchez, Barbara A. Baier, Lin Quenzer, and many other feminist writers, particularly of Nebraska and the Midwest region. It printed dispatches from the Lincoln Legion of Lesbians, Queer Nation Nebraska, the YWCA and other organizations.

== See also ==
- Second-wave feminism
- Feminist sex wars
- LGBT rights in Nebraska
- Lincoln Legion of Lesbians
- OutNebraska
