= Martha Violet Ball =

American educator and philanthropist

- Born: May 17, 1811; Boston, Massachusetts, U.S.
- Died: December 22, 1894 (aged 83); Boston, Massachusetts, U.S.
- Occupation: teacher; philanthropist; activist; writer; editor
- Language: English

Martha Violet Ball (May 17, 1811 – December 22, 1894) was a 19th-century American educator, philanthropist, activist, writer, and editor. Ball and her sister, Lucy, undertook the work of opening a school for young African American girls in the West End of Boston. In the same year, 1833, she assisted in the organization of the Boston Female Anti-Slavery Society, of which she and Lucy held leadership roles. Her work among unfortunate women and girls led to the formation of the New England Female Moral Reform Society, with which she was from its beginning connected as Secretary and Manager. For twenty-five years, she was joint-editor of its organ, the Home Guardian, and was also affiliated in its department, "The Children's Fireside". She was a constituent member of the Ladies' Baptist Bethel Society, first as its Secretary and for thirty years its President. Ball was the first President of the Woman's Union Missionary Society of America for Heathen Lands, and a charter member of the New England Woman's Press Association. She was the author of several small, popular books.

== Early life and education ==
Martha Violet Ball was born in Boston, Massachusetts, May 17, 1811. Her parents were Joseph T. Ball (born, Jamaica, West Indies) and Mary Montgomery Drew Ball. There were at least five siblings, Mary (1800–1829), Joseph (1805–1861), Lucy (1807–1891), Hannah (1813–1888), and Thomas (1819–1819). She was educated in the public schools and by private tutors.

== Career ==
Ball was a school teacher for thirty years and a Sunday school teacher for forty years. From 1833 to 1839, Ball and her sister operated a school for young African American girls in West End, Boston. In 1838, under the auspices of the New England Female Moral Reform Society, she started providing services for fallen, intemperate women and unfortunate young girls. In this regard, Ball served on The Home Guardian, a monthly periodical published by the society, for twenty-seven years, ten years, beginning in 1837, as assistant and seventeen years as editor. She resigned in 1890, on account of the illness of her sister, Lucy.

Ball was one of the women who in 1833 assisted in forming the Boston Female Anti-Slavery Society in the parlor of Mrs. J. N. Barbour. She served as recording secretary in 1837–38. She continued to labor for the overthrow of slavery until it was abolished.

In 1836, assisted by a few friends, she opened an evening school for young African American girls in the west part of Boston. In 1840, after the dissolution of the Boston Female Anti-Slavery Society, Ball and her sister, Lucy, helped found the Massachusetts Female Emancipation Society.

In 1838, Ball was sent as a delegate to an anti-slavery convention of women held in Philadelphia, Pennsylvania Hall, where the convention met, was attacked by a mob of several thousands, the women were driven out and pelted with stones, mud and missiles of various kinds, and Ball was struck in her chest by a piece of brick. The hall was shortly after burned to the ground by the mob.

Ball aided in forming the Ladies' Baptist Bethel Society and was secretary for a time. She was then elected president, and retained that office for thirty years. The society became a large and influential body, laboring under the auspices of the Boston Baptist Bethel Society. In 1860, Ball, with a few other women, organized the Woman's Union Missionary Society of America for Heathen Lands.

A charter member of the New England Woman's Press Association, she was the author of several small, popular books.

== Personal life ==
In religion, Ball was a Baptist. She was a member of the Rowe Street Baptist Church in Boston, where she was prominent in social and religious work, and was long interested in Home and Foreign Missions. She died in Boston on December 22, 1894, aged 83.
