= Margaret Prior =

American writer and reformer (1773–1842)

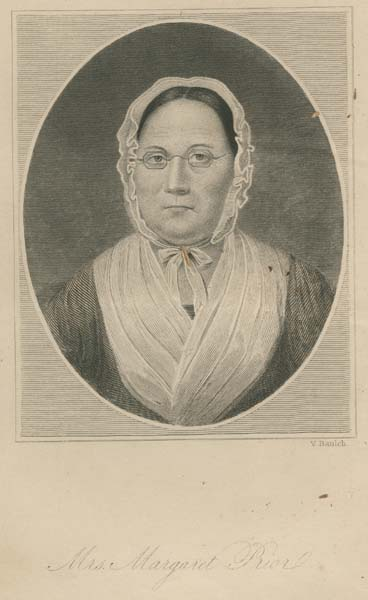
- Born: Margaret Barrett; 1773; Fredericksburg, Colony of Virginia, British America
- Died: April 7, 1842 (aged 68-69); New York City, U.S.
- Occupations: humanitarian; urban missionary; moral reform worker; writer; school founder
- Spouses: William Allen (m. 1879; died 1808); William Prior (m. 1814; died 1829)
- Writing career
- Language: English

Margaret Prior (née, Barrett; after first marriage, Allen; after second marriage, Prior; 1773 – April 7, 1842) was an American humanitarian, urban missionary, moral reform worker, and writer who established a school and a soup kitchen in New York City. She was well known in New York City as one of the most successful laborers in the cause of moral reform, between the years 1835 and 1845. Prior was one of the originators of the American Female Moral Reform Society. She was, for a number of years, one of its managers, and was for five years in its employment as a missionary in New York City. The reports of her visits were published posthumously in Walks of usefulness, or, Reminiscences of Mrs. Margaret Prior, in 1851.

== Early life ==
Margaret Barrett was born in Fredericksburg, Virginia, in 1773. Prior was the daughter of William Barrett, a farmer of the township of Fredericksburg. Both her parents were religious. Her mother died when she was a child, and a stepmother took her place. At an early age, Prior was taught to be frugal and to rely upon herself.

== Career ==
At the age of sixteen, she married William Allen, a merchant of Baltimore. They had several children who died before he was lost at sea with the vessel which he owned and commanded. Shortly after Allen's death, Prior and her only remaining son removed to New York, where she could have the counsel of an elder sister who resided in the city.

In 1814, six years after the death of her first husband, she married William Prior, a merchant, and a member of the Society of Friends, who was somewhat distinguished for his benevolence and public spirit.

During Allen's lifetime, she made a public profession of religion by uniting with the Baptist Church. But it was not till after she had spent several years with her second husband that she became acquainted with the Methodists. An invitation had been given to attend a Methodists meeting in the church that was separated from her residence only by an adjoining yard. Having developed strong prejudices against Methodism, the invitation was not accepted. But her own place of worship being at some distance, she was induced on a Sunday morning to select a place beneath a shade-tree in her own garden, where she could, without being perceived, listen to the sermon. In 1819, Prior united with the Methodist Episcopal Church, and remained member till her death.

Soon after, the New York Asylum for Orphans was instituted, and she became one of its Board of Managers. She was in the habit of visiting the Asylum on holidays, and of distributing baskets of presents among the children. She said they were deprived of their parents, and had no friends to bestow the little gifts that other children expect on such occasions; and the privilege of conferring such favors was a source of enjoyment.

Prior was also a stated visitor at the House of Refuge. Her connection with the House of Refuge, where she was a constant visitor, led her to dwell upon the causes and consequences of early crime among the type of females who were gathered there. There she saw the result of its beginnings; and in another department of her labor, the hospital and penitentiary, she saw its end.

During most of the time intervening between 1819 and 1828, her residence was on Bowery hill, in the upper part of the city. Her house was large, surrounded by a pleasant yard and wide garden, filled with flowers and shrubbery, fruit trees and shade trees. In 1822, after visiting in the neighborhood around her, and learning of its troubles, she established a school for the children of the poor, hired a teacher, and visited it weekly for conversation and prayer. Prior contributed personally US$100 per annum to sustain this school, but several friends also contributed pecuniary aid from time to time.

While quite young, like many others, she acquired the habit of using snuff, and continued it for many years, but felt compelled to quit after she began laboring in behalf of the temperance movement. Mr. Prior died September 14, 1829, and subsequently, she removed from her Bowery hill home to a more modest residence.

Early in the year 1833, the Moral Reform Society was originated, with the aim for prevention. In 1834, Prior became associated with the New York Female Moral Reform Society as an urban missionary. In the year 1837, Prior was first employed by the American Female Moral Reform Society, as a city missionary, and furnished with tracts and papers, with instructions to visit from house to house, as she had so long been accustomed to do in her tract districts. She was also requested to render reports of her labors at the meetings of the society, that extracts might be gathered suitable for their periodical. She remarked that she had written littled for many years, and at her advanced age, she felt unable to commit to writing for the press. It was suggested that she employ someone to write for her, and after some deliberation, she chose an amanuensis. Her reports, as given verbally, were briefly narrated, together with her remarks, and then read to her for correction and alteration, so that the statements and sentiments expressed were her own.

In soup-houses, and as a city missionary among the poor, her labors were arduous. After seven of her children died, she fostered others, and adopted at least two children. She was numbered among those active Christians, of conservative theological opinions, who were industrious in organizing week-day and sabbath schools, industrial associations, and temperance societies, establishing soup-houses and orphan-asylums. She continued in this work until she became too ill to do so.

== Death and legacy ==
She died in New York City, on April 7, 1842, aged 68 years. After her death a small volume, containing a narrative of her work in the cause of benevolence, was published by the American Female Moral Reform Society. In the preface to that work, it is said that "During the last five years of her life she was thought to have been instrumental in the conversion of more than one hundred souls." It describes the death of her second husband and that of seven children; her removal from a pleasant home on Bowery Hill; and many other trials through which Prior passed.

== Selected works ==
- Walks of usefulness, or, Reminiscences of Mrs. Margaret Prior, 1851
