= Paid My Dues: Journal of Women and Music =

American feminist magazine

Paid My Dues
- Front cover of Paid My Due's last issue (Spring 1980). Features Mary Watkins. Image retrieved from https://queermusicheritage.com/pmd1.html
- Editors: Kathryn Gohl, Karen Corti, Judy Erickson, Kathryn Judd, Toni Armstrong Jr., and many others.
- Frequency: Irregular
- Publisher: Woman's Soul Publishing (1974-1976) Calliope Publishing, Inc. (1977-1980)
- Founder: Dorothy Dean
- First issue: 1974
- Final issue: Spring 1980
- Based in: Milwaukee, Wisconsin (1974-1976) Chicago, Illinois (1977-1980)
- ISSN: 0097-8035

Paid My Dues: Journal of Women & Music was an American feminist periodical published from 1974 until 1980. Paid My Dues was the first, and for some time the only, feminist music journal. Published quarterly, it provided a literary space for women to write and share their experiences and ideas about music. It published articles on instruments, reviews on songs and albums, as well as music sheets. In contributing to the feminist movement of the late '70s, the magazine was devoted to celebrating the culture and history of women and music.

First established in 1973 under the name My Sister's Song, the magazine started as a discography of women's music and as a directory of women musicians in North America. One year later, the magazine began publishing as Paid My Dues: A Quarterly Journal of Women and Music. However, due to high demand and unprecedented busy schedules, they dropped "Quarterly" from the name from 1975 until Spring 1979.

Apart from articles, Paid My Dues accepted submissions from readers such as songs, photographs, and interviews. They also often collaborated with other feminist periodicals such as Country Women and HERESIES.
