= Black Maria (magazine) =

Defunct American feminist magazine

- First Collective (Founding Editors): Donna Ippolito, Marge Everett, Karen Ney, and Kathy Rowley
- Second Collective: Barbara Emrys, Francine Krasno, Susan Wexler, Betty Codell, and Denice Renschen
- Publisher: Black Maria Collective, Inc.
- First issue: December 1971
- Country: United States
- Based in: Chicago, Illinois
- ISSN: 0045-222X

Black Maria was an American feminist magazine from Chicago, Illinois. Established in 1971 by Donna Ippolito, Marge Everett, Karen Ney, and Kathy Rowley, the magazine devoted their publications on feminist journalism, essays on controversial topics, and lesbian writing. Describing itself as a "feminist journal of art and politics," their content also included book reviews, biographies, and interviews. The first few issues of the magazine focused on articles about and by Chicago-area women until they expanded nation-wide later on.

Janet Ruth Heller, one of the founders of a similar magazine called Primavera, explained that the name Black Maria was "chosen by the collective because it refers to the black paddy wagons used by the police to cart the early American suffragettes to jail. [The] title reveals the editors' awareness of women's history and political issues."

The preface of the first issue in December 1971, which was written by the founding editors, explains Black Maria's origins:

"Black Maria was conceived many months ago among several women who were then part of a rap group affiliated with the Chicago Women's Liberation Union. At the time there was no publication devoted entirely to the writings of Chicago-area women and we saw and felt the need. It seemed to us that a magazine could provide local women with a unique place in which to meet, speak, learn and grow, and that it could contribute toward the development of a women's consciousness and perspective that are truly and firmly our own. So much for theory. We were really starting from scratch—no money, no experience, no articles, no skills—and every single step had to be learned along the way..."
