= Boston Female Liberation =

Radical feminist organization during the 1960s

Boston Female Liberation was an American radical feminist organization founded in Boston in 1968. The group published The Second Wave, which described itself as "a magazine of the new feminism." The first issue was in the spring of 1971.

== Purpose ==
The first issue of the organization's The Second Wave included "A Statement About Female Liberation," which states in part:

Female Liberation is an organization which encompasses all aspects of the feminist struggle, including education, consciousness-raising activities, and action around such basic demands of the movement as childcare, abortion and equal pay. No woman is excluded from Female Liberation who is interested in the development of a strong, autonomous women's movement capable of bringing about change on every level.

== Activities ==
The organization was initially known as Cell 16. The organization participated in activities in defense of a woman's right to choose abortion and for free, community-controlled child care available up to twenty-four hours a day. Female Liberation advocated and promoted self-defense. In September 1970, participating in a "Symposium on Feminism" at the University of Pittsburgh, two members of Female Liberation demonstrated karate techniques.

Boston Female Liberation participated in protests against U.S. involvement in the Vietnam War and helped to build women's contingents. At a rally in Boston, November 1971, Pat Galligan spoke on behalf of the organization telling the crowd, "American women and the people of Southeast Asia have the same enemy. We want the government out of the war, out of our wombs, and out of our way."

The organisation also helped to build conferences on women's liberation at various Boston area campuses. At Boston University in the fall of 1970, sponsoring "a weekend of education and discussion for all women." Workshop topics included, "Black and Third World Women," "Marriage," and "Is Feminism Revolutionary?"

As of 1974, it was cited as one of the few women's organizations to maintain an official membership system.
