= The Future Is Female =

Feminist slogan

"The Future is Female" is a feminist slogan coined in the 1970s by workers at Labyris Books, the first women's bookstore in New York City which opened in 1972. The slogan was featured on store merchandise and gained popularity after a photograph of Alix Dobkin, taken by her then partner Liza Cowan, circulated in DYKE: A Quarterly. However the phrase did not come into mainstream use until the mid-2010s when the photograph of Dobkin was shared on Instagram and seen by graphic designer Rachel Berks. Berks, the owner of the store Otherwild, began printing shirts in 2015. The slogan was eventually used by Hillary Clinton in her concession speech to her 2016 presidential campaign, where it became a popular phrase for feminist merchandise.

Since then, "The Future is Female" has been used as the title of books and articles, by the United Nations Development Programme, art exhibits, and an album by the band the Von Tramps. Despite its mainstream popularity, the slogan has caused controversy and claims that it is misandrist as well as reinforcing the gender binary.
