= Women: A Journal of Liberation =

Defunct American journal (1968-1983)

- Founder: Dee Ann Mims, Donna Keck, Vicki Pollard, and Carmen Arbona
- Founded: 1968
- First issue: Fall 1969
- Final issue: 1983
- Based in: Baltimore, Maryland, USA
- Language: English
- ISSN: 0043-7433
- OCLC: 1696334

Women: A Journal of Liberation was a North American women's journal based on second-wave feminism. The journal was created in 1968 by Dee Ann Mims, Donna Keck, Vicki Pollard, and Carmen Arbona in Baltimore, Maryland after attending one of the first Women's Liberation Conferences. Citing a gap in the market for a national feminist publication and a need for a communications network for the second-wave feminist movement, the four got to work. The first issue was published in August 1969.

Beginning as a quarterly publication, the journal reduced its prints to three per year, cycling a collective of volunteer contributors of 9-15 for each issue. By the end, over 100 individuals had contributed to the periodical.

3,000 copies of the first issue were printed, reaching 20,000 in its peak, considering it a popular alternative press magazines for its time.

== Stance and editorial content ==
The foundations of the Feminine Mystique made up the foundations of the journal's ideology in conjunction with the liberal feminist stance of National Organization for Women (NOW).

Taking the position of the socialist feminist, the journal was oriented toward working-class women. Specific positions on subjects fluctuated as a result of the revolving collective of contributors which assisted in providing diverse, but radical feminist discourse. The collective itself espoused cultural feminism as a practice and as a way to differentiate themselves from other popular feminist organizations.

Each issue revolved around particular themes or topics which included: nature vs. nurture, history of the women's liberation movement, arts, aging, homosexuality, work, politics, and more. Issues often included contributions from prominent feminist thinkers.

The collective at Women: A Journal of Liberation differentiated itself from other collectives, rejecting separation from heterosexuals in order to be inclusive to all women and feminists in Baltimore which garnered both praise and criticism from different groups.

== Discontinuation ==
As a result of financial strain, the journal ceased publication in 1983. Citing an inadequate business model, advertising policy, and costly distribution arrangements, the collective was more concerned with getting the magazine made well and distributed to its subscribers than it was with making money.

== Noted Contributors ==
- Eve Merriam
- Linda Gordon
- Elsa Gidlow
- Tillie Olsen
- Rita Mae Brown
- Ellen Bass
- Barbara Ehrenreich
- Margaret Randall
- Audre Lorde
- May Sarton
- Judy Grahn

== See also ==
List of feminist periodicals in the United States

List of feminist literature
