= Advocate and Family Guardian =

American periodical

- Editor: S. R. I. Bennett (initial)
- Frequency: Semi-monthly
- Publisher: American Female Guardian Society
- Founder: New York Female Moral Reform Society
- First issue: 1835
- Final issue Number: June 1941; Vol. 109, no. 6
- Country: U.S.
- Language: English
- OCLC: 30552324

The Advocate and Family Guardian (former names, Advocate of Moral Reform, Advocate of Moral Reform and Family Guardian, and Advocate and Guardian; 1835–1941) was an American periodical published semi-monthly by the New York Female Moral Reform Society and its successor, the American Female Guardian Society, characterized as a "pioneer child-saving institution in the U.S.". The first number appeared in 1835 and the last, in volume 109, number 6, in June 1941. Initial publication took place at 29 East 29th Street, in New York City. The Advocate, a continuation of McDowell's Journal, went through several name changes: Advocate of Moral Reform (1835–47), The Advocate of Moral Reform and Family Guardian, (1847–49), finally, The Advocate and Family Guardian from 1849 until it ceased publication in 1941.

== Advocate of Moral Reform ==
After the formation of the Society, and previous to his illness, John Robert McDowall (1801–1836) had discontinued the publication of his Journal, and given to this Society, his list of subscribers, with whatever payments were due-but with no restrictions-a gift that afterward proved of special service in establishing a new paper, under different auspices, and in no sense, identified with any previous publication.

The first work of the Society was the establishment of a semimonthly paper, the Advocate of Moral Reform, which should be an exponent of their principles, and an organ of communication with the public. Still young in years, timid, unused to business beyond the confines of home, the leaders in this work had much to learn in a new sphere of duty, where wisdom, skill, and efficiency were indispensable. Pecuniary resources they had none, and how to prosecute their enterprise without embarrassment was an unsolved problem. But they were encouraged by the approval of their husbands and pastors.

It was designed to be the ally and defender of virtue, and to hold up before the world as their prominent aim, "Remedy if practicable, Prevention by every possible Christian endeavor". It was to be also an agency for procuring funds to carry forward the work. The first few numbers of the Advocate enlisted sympathy and co-operation among Christian women in the U.S. The Advocate was issued monthly and widely distributed, a vigorous correspondence carried on. From a paper of December 1, 1835, comes the following:—

"The present number of the Advocate concludes its first year. We entered this field from an impressive sense of duty. To do good, to save the youth of our beloved land from crime and ruin, has been our only object. All the funds which the public have placed at our disposal have been faithfully expended in sustaining the Advocate, or in other efforts to advance the cause. That our paper has done good, we have the most unquestionable testimony. It has drawn the attention of virtuous females to hidden moral evils; it has called into existence about fifty auxiliary associations; induced many a parent to impart instruction to his children upon a subject vastly important, yet hitherto neglected. Should our labors in this cause end here, we feel that we have done what we could to stay the progress of that moral pestilence, which threatens alike the morals of our children and the fair institutions of our country."

By 1837, the Advocate stated it had 16,500 subscribers, which made it the most widely-read periodical in the U.S. at that time. The issue of that paper of June 1, 1837, showed that 200 auxiliary bodies were connected with the Female Moral Reform Society, and that about 15,000 women were "all pledged to the great principles of Moral Reform." The Advocate denounced "the sickly sentimentality which for reasons of supposed delicacy ignores ugly facts." An article in this publication, April 15, 1837, estimated, as the result of an investigation, that the number of "notoriously abandoned females" in U.S. cities was at least 150,000. When the Advocate denounced writings which "corrupt the taste, seduce the heart through the senses and pollute it through the medium of imagination which they have made wild, restless and uncontrollable," its purpose was to breed wholesomeness of mind.

After the lapse of years, and in view of the enlarging sphere of the Society, disapprobation of its title, even among its friends, was expressed, as calculated to arouse prejudice on the one hand, and on the other, not sufficiently to define its aims.

== Advocate of Moral Reform and Family Guardian ==
In reply to these objections, the editor remarks, in the closing issue of 1846, "The Society and its friends have never regarded the term 'Moral Reform' as implying exclusively and specifically the reformation of the abandoned. Far otherwise; with them it signifies reform in public sentiment, reform in social customs; in a word, reform in whatever is erroneous in belief or practice coming within the scope of the Divine command relative to purity of heart and life. Such is the Moral Reform' they advocate, and they do it, having for their chief end and aim, to prevent moral evil, and to warn the young and unfriended to flee from temptation before their steps slide, and ruin overtakes them. The other objection, viz.: that the term 'Moral Reform' is not sufficiently definite, we admit to be just, and wish to remedy. The work of the Society has greatly enlarged since the name was given to their paper, and many of the exposed and needy have now come to look to it rather as a guardian institution. Its field of usefulness, as hitherto, will be mainly in the family circle. Here lie the rising hopes of our country. Let the domestic hearth be sedulously guarded, and kept pure, as it may be, from the taint of moral evil, and a generation of the pure in heart, blessed of Heaven, and prepared to see God, will yet live to bless the earth."

From that date the paper was called The Advocate of Moral Reform and Family Guardian,.

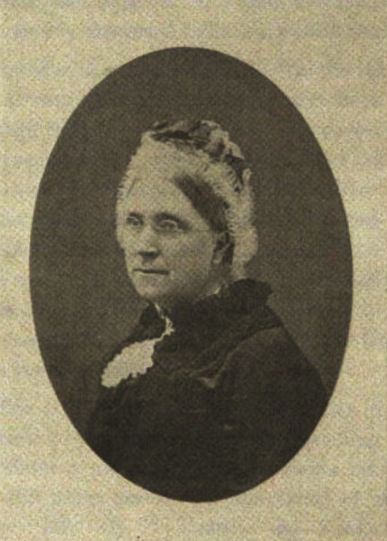
Sarah R. Ingraham Bennett, 1884

After many years of work in the interests of the Society, as Corresponding Secretary and editor of its paper, Sarah R. Ingraham Bennett's health failed, and the paper passed into the hands of Helen E. Brown, the executive committee still retaining the oversight of its publication.

Communication with the Southern section of the country being interrupted by the civil war, the subscription list became greatly lessened, and other circumstances tended to reduce the circulation of the Advocate. The most prominent of these was the multiplication of religious periodicals, and especially the journals advocating its peculiar principles, for as "Homes for the Friendless" arose in large U.S. cities, most of them also had a paper to plead its cause.

== Advocate and Family Guardian ==
The name was subsequently abbreviated to Advocate and Family Guardian.

In 1877, Geo. P. Rowell and Co.'s American Newspaper Directory reported that the periodical was sixteen pages long, each page measuring 9 by 12 inches (230 mm × 300 mm). The cost of a subscription was US$1 and circulation was estimated to be 10,000.

== Notable people ==
- S. R. I. Bennett, editor from 1842 to 1867
- Helen E. Brown, editor from 1867-

== See also ==
- List of feminist periodicals in the United States
