= Womyn's Braille Press =

American organization by blind women

Womyn's Braille Press (WBP) was an American feminist organization run by blind women from 1980 to 1996. Their primary goal was to make feminist and lesbian literature accessible for women who are blind or print disabled. They produced tapes, braille prints, and even circulated a newsletter for twelve years. The newsletter was one of the very few publications for women with disabilities at the time. The project ran for many years and augmented the feminist movement of the 1980s by providing a network for visually impaired women.

== History ==
WBP was founded in Minneapolis, Minnesota, by Marj Schneider when she was a Women's Studies major at the University of Minnesota. Schneider wanted to take a proactive and assertive approach in providing books for visually disabled women rather than wait for a government agency to fund one. She decided, along with many other women she met through an organization of the blind, that they had the knowledge, skills, and abilities to take on a project that would produce feminist literature for themselves and other blind women.

It has been said that WBP often reproduced works that the Library of Congress deemed "too risqué" for blind readers. One of those works, for example, was Dykes to Watch Out For by Alison Bechdel. Cassette tapes were then produced "underground" and remained absent in the Library of Congress system. Mara Mills, an assistant professor from NYU Steinhardt studying the organization's archives, once reflected that these tapes were "labors of love". Mills said that these materials were produced by dedicated "volunteers who put hours of work into reading each page aloud, and in the case of a graphic novel describing every image—and by Womyn's Braille Press coordinators who facilitated their own network of tape exchange."

Womyn's Braille Press often partnered up with other feminist periodicals such as off our backs, Sinister Wisdom, and Lesbian Contradiction. A 1990 library newsletter and a 1997 disability resource guide described WBP as producing books and periodicals on tape, circulating several feminist periodicals on cassette, and publishing a quarterly newsletter in braille, on tape, and in print that covered issues of interest to women with disabilities.
