= Massachusetts Female Emancipation Society =

The Massachusetts Female Emancipation Society was founded by Mary Parker and sisters Martha and Lucy Ball in the year 1840. The society was a female abolitionist society based in Boston, Massachusetts, and was formed after the disbanding of the Boston Female Anti-Slavery Society by former members.

== Split from the Boston Female Anti-Slavery Society ==
The Massachusetts Female Emancipation Society was formed after the Boston Female Anti-Slavery Society (BFAS) disbanded and split into two groups. It was made up of former members of the BFAS and founded by former BFAS president Mary Parker and the Ball sisters, Lucy and Martha. The split was originally caused by growing tensions in the Boston Female Antislavery society stemming from differences in beliefs among members of the society. Parker and the Ball sister felt that the Boston Female Antislavery Society was shifting away from its original goals and anti-slavery precepts by supporting reform agendas created by William Lloyd Garrison.

Differences in socioeconomic status and religion among members also divided the society. The BFAS was composed mostly of women who were from a wealthier socioeconomic status. The women of the BFAS also tended to be intellectuals and professed a variety of different Protestant religions such as Unitarianism and Quakerism. However, the women who broke from the BFAS to create with the Massachusetts Female Emancipation Society tended to be of a lower to middle class in terms of wealth. They also were mainly evangelical and did not have the same upper-class connections and resources that the majority of the Boston Female Anti-Slavery Society members had.

== Membership ==
The Massachusetts Female Emancipation Society was less religiously diverse than the Boston Female Anti-Slavery Society had been. Yet there continued to be diversity in terms of age, because members tended to join as family groups, meaning that individuals of different ages from the same family belonged to the MFES. Thus the society had members ranging from teen girls to women in their fifties. Although the organization was mostly white, black women were able to join and participate as well. There was also a great deal of diversity in terms of marital status. Many of the women participating remained unmarried, including those who had been leaders in the Boston Female Anti-Slavery Society, like Lucy and Martha Ball.

== Beliefs ==
The Massachusetts Female Emancipation Society's beliefs and views were based on religion and the ideals of motherhood and womanhood at the time. They were also influenced by the culture of the 19th century, with the idea of separate spheres and the Cult of Womanhood being influential factors. The members of the Society tended to be guided by the principles of "female martyrdom and self-abnegation, duty combined with self-denial." This factored heavily into their work as abolitionists and how they viewed themselves within the movement for freedom. The Massachusetts Female Emancipation Society members believed that black women deserved the rights and privileges of motherhood and womanhood that they were being denied. This contrasted with the views of the Boston Female Anti-Slavery Society, whose members instead believed that slavery was immoral due to its influence on the inherent rights and accountability.

== Achievements ==
After the group broke off from the Boston Female Anti-Slavery Society, it began to shift their area of interest to assisting other disenfranchised peoples. They founded charities and halfway houses to "assist prostitutes and... homeless women." Later, they took over certain projects of the Boston Female Anti-Slavery Society. Specifically, they began managing the Samaritan Asylum for Colored Indigent Children, a project previously taken on by the Boston Female Anti-Slavery Society who then transferred management of the project to the Massachusetts Female Emancipation Society.

Many of the sources and documents connected to the Massachusetts Female Emancipation Society have been lost or are not legible and so exact dates are difficult to find on when the group formally disbanded.
