= Lydia Andrews Finney =

- Born: March 8, 1804; New Britain, Connecticut, U.S.
- Died: December 17, 1847 (aged 43)
- Resting place: Oberlin, Ohio, U.S.

Lydia Andrews Finney (March 8, 1804 – December 17, 1847), born Lydia Root, was an American social reformer and evangelical revivalist during the Second Great Awakening. She was most notably a founder of the New York Female Moral Reform Society.

== Early life ==
Finney was born in New Britain, Connecticut, the fifth child of Nathaniel Andrews and Sarah Marcy. She grew up with her family in the then religiously vibrant Whitestown, New York, where she lived until she married her husband, Charles Grandison Finney, in 1824. When she first met her would-be husband, he was not Christian and she prayed for his conversion, which would ultimately occur a few months after they first met in Adams, New York. They were married on October 5, 1824.

== Career ==
Finney was an active revivalist throughout her life and joined her husband on many revival tours across the country. While her husband would preach, she would often lead women's prayer sessions. She would also often establish maternal organizations and women's church groups in the towns that they visited.

Along with helping her husband, she was one of the founders and first directress of the New York Female Moral Reform Society. The group initially focused on what they saw as the widespread plague that was prostitution in America during the time, and advocated for approaches that would hold men as well as women responsible, as well as practical ways to reduce prostitution. It eventually grew to have many branches outside of New York, and shifted to focus on more general women's issues. Finney's actions were controversial during the time, as she and other women openly discussed the then-taboo topic of prostitution.

In 1835, her husband took a job teaching theology at Oberlin College in Ohio, and shortly after she and their children moved to join him. She was very active both politically and socially in Oberlin, and helped found multiple organizations including the Oberlin Female Moral Reform Society, the Oberlin Maternal Association, and the Ohio Ladies Anti-Slavery Society. She also arranged for three former prostitutes to study at Oberlin as part of her anti-prostitution activism.

== See also ==
- New York Female Moral Reform Society
- Charles Grandison Finney
- Oberlin College
- Second Great Awakening
