= Feminist: Japan =

Feminist bi-monthly magazine established in Tokyo, Japan

FEMINIST
- Front cover of the International No. 2 issue
- Executive Editors: Ikuko Atsumi & Diane L. Simpson
- First issue: 1977
- Country: Japan, United States, Netherlands
- Based in: Tokyo, Japan; New York City, U.S.; Los Angeles, U.S. Amersfoort, Netherlands
- Language: Japanese, English

Feminist: Japan or FEMINIST was a Japanese feminist bi-monthly magazine established in Tokyo, in 1977. Led by Ikuko Atsumi and a group of academic women, the journal aimed to make women's voices heard and to promote women's studies, which was not yet a part of the curriculum in Japanese universities. The magazine covered topics and themes such as women and language, media, motherhood, arts, and power.

FEMINIST was first published by Boku-shin-sha, Tokyo, during late summer 1977. Due to the first issue's "outstanding graphic appeal", "unflinching content" and commercial success, the magazine ventured internationally and released its second issue in New York City under the name Feminist: Japan in spring 1978. The executive editors of the international issue were Atsumi and Diane L. Simpson. Feminist: Japan was published internationally and had offices in New York City, Los Angeles, and Amersfoort in the Netherlands.
