= Sarah Hoagland =

American philosopher (born 1945)

Sarah Lucia Hoagland
- Born: June 4, 1945 (age 81); Denver, Colorado
- Known for: Bernard Brommel Distinguished Research Professor and Professor Emerita of Philosophy and Women's Studies at Northeastern Illinois University in Chicago

Sarah Lucia Hoagland (born 4 June 1945 in Denver, Colorado) is the Bernard Brommel Distinguished Research Professor and Professor Emerita of Philosophy and Women's Studies at Northeastern Illinois University in Chicago.

== Biography ==
She authored Lesbian Ethics: Toward New Value. She was also co-editor (with Julia Penelope) of For Lesbians Only, an anthology of writing on the topic of lesbian separatism, and (with Marilyn Frye) Re-reading the Canon: Feminist Interpretations of Mary Daly.

Hoagland is a collective member of the Institute of Lesbian Studies in Chicago, a staff member of the Escuela Popular Norteña, and a Research Associate of the Philosophy Interpretation and Culture Center at Binghamton University (Vestal, New York).

In 2000, Hoagland was inducted into the Chicago Gay and Lesbian Hall of Fame.

In 2017, Hoagland married her partner of 34 years, Anne Leighton.

== Works ==
=== Books ===
- Hoagland, Sarah Lucia; Penelope, Julia (1988). For Lesbians Only: A Separatist Anthology. London: Onlywomen Press Ltd. ISBN 9780906500286.
- Hoagland, Sarah (1992). Lesbian Ethics: Toward New Value. Palo Alto, California: Institute of Lesbian Studies. ISBN 9780934903035.
- Hoagland, Sarah Lucia; Frye, Marilyn (2000). Feminist interpretations of Mary Daly. Re-reading the cannon. University Park, Pennsylvania: Pennsylvania State University. ISBN 9780271020198.

=== Essays ===
- Hoagland, Sarah Lucia; Penelope, Julia (1980). "Lesbianism, Sexuality and Power: The Patriarchy, Violence and Pornography". Sinister Wisdom. 15. Amherst, Massachusetts. OCLC 70961358.
- Hoagland, Sarah Lucia (1982), "Sadism, Masochism, and Lesbian-Feminism", in Russell, Diana E. H.; Star, Susan Leigh; Linden, Robin Ruth; et al. (eds.), Against Sadomasochism: A Radical Feminist Analysis, East Palo Alto, California: Frog in the Well, pp. 153–163, ISBN 9780960362837.
- Hoagland, Sarah Lucia (1986). "Moral Agency Under Oppression". Trivia: A Journal of Ideas (9). North Amherst, Massachusetts. OCLC 610413666.
- Hoagland, Sarah Lucia (1990). "Some Concerns About Nel Noddings' Caring". Hypatia. 5 (1): 109–114. doi:10.1111/j.1527-2001.1990.tb00394.x. S2CID 144960864.
- Hoagland, Sarah Lucia (1991), "Some Thoughts About "Caring"", in Card, Claudia (ed.), Feminist Ethics, Lawrence, Kansas: University Press of Kansas, pp. 246–263, ISBN 9780700604838.
- Hoagland, Sarah Lucia (1995). "Why Lesbian Ethics?". Hypatia. 7 (4): 195–206. doi:10.1111/j.1527-2001.1992.tb00726.x. S2CID 145454869.
- Beltré, Mildred; Bryce, Geoff; Camacho, Julia Schiavone; Flores, Aurelia; Gonzales, Easa; Hernandez, Nydia; Hoagland, Sarah; Keating, Cricket; Kerr, Laura DuMond; Lugones, María; Mutis, Rafael; Price, Josh; Restrepo, Rocio; Santos, Rick; Silverio, Rocio (1999). "Towards a practice of radical engagement: Escuela Popular Norteña's 'Politicizing the Everyday' Workshop". The Radical Teacher (56): 13–18. ISSN 0191-4847. JSTOR 20710014.
- Hoagland, Sarah Lucia (2007). "Heterosexualism and White Supremacy". Hypatia. 22 (1): 166–185. doi:10.1111/j.1527-2001.2007.tb01155.x. S2CID 144026873.
- Hoagland, Sarah Lucia (2010), "Oaths", in Sandlin, Jennifer; Schultz, Brian; Burdick, Jake (eds.), Handbook of Public Pedagogy, Routledge, doi:10.4324/9780203863688, ISBN 9781135184193
- Hoagland, Sarah Lucia (2010), "Colonial Practices/Colonial Identities: All the Women Are Still White", in Yancy, George (ed.), The Center Must Not Hold: White Women on the Whiteness of Philosophy, Rowman & Littlefield, ISBN 978-1283599283
- Hoagland, Sarah Lucia (2020-01-01). "Aspects of the Coloniality of Knowledge". Critical Philosophy of Race. 8 (1–2). The Pennsylvania State University Press: 48–60. doi:10.5325/critphilrace.8.1-2.0048. ISSN 2165-8684. S2CID 212859120.

=== Reviews ===
- Hoagland, Sarah Lucia (2007). "Review of (1) Undivided Rights: Women of Color Organize for Reproductive Justice. Jael Silliman, Marlene Gerber Fried, Loretta Ross and Elena R. Gutiérrez. Boston: South End Press. (2) Policing the National Body: Race, Gender and Criminalization. Edited by Jael Silliman and Anannya Bhattacharjee. Cambridge, Mass.: South End Press. (3) Conquest: Sexual Violence and American Indian Genocide. Andrea Smith. Boston: South End Press". Hypatia. 22 (2). doi:10.1111/j.1527-2001.2007.tb00988.x. S2CID 232181403.
