= Womanart =

Womanart Magazine's First Issue from Summer 1976. Image from womanartmag.org

Womanart was an American feminist magazine that was published quarterly in Brooklyn, New York. It began in 1976 and concluded in 1978, publishing a total of seven issues. Each publication primarily consisted of articles on women artists, reviews on galleries, and reports from Women's Caucus for Art Conferences. The magazine’s editor and publisher Ellen Lubell stated that they aimed to augment what was then a lack of “literary discussion of the work of women artists.”
