= The Second Wave: A Magazine of The New Feminism =

American feminist magazine

The Second Wave
- First Issue of The Second Wave (Spring 1971). Image retrieved from the Independent Voices Archive.
- Categories: Feminist magazine
- Publisher: Female Liberation
- First issue: Spring 1971
- Final issue: 1983
- Company: The Second Wave, Inc.
- Based in: Cambridge, MA
- ISSN: 0048-9980
- OCLC: 2267579

The Second Wave: A Magazine of The New Feminism was an American feminist magazine from Cambridge, Massachusetts. Founded in 1971, the magazine published fiction, poetry, book reviews, graphics, and various feminist articles. Though they included works by famous feminists such as Adrienne Rich, Mary Daly, and Victoria Redel, the magazine mostly published works by unknown authors.

The magazine was published by Boston Female Liberation, an organization which "encompasses all aspects of the feminist struggle, including education, consciousness-raising activities, and action around such basic demands of the movement as childcare, abortion and equal pay."

According to the first issue, the title of the publication was "chosen to remind us that [the feminist] movement started well over a century ago and that we are the second wave of feminists in an ongoing struggle."

The Second Wave released a total of 22 issues before ceasing publication in 1983 due to lack of funding.
