= Lincoln Legion of Lesbians =

Lesbian feminist collective in Lincoln, Nebraska

- Symbol used by Lincoln Legion of Lesbians
- Formation: 1976
- Founder: Julia Penelope
- Dissolved: circa 1991
- Purpose: reduce homophobia and promote lesbian community
- Headquarters: Lincoln, Nebraska
- Publication: Lesbian Community News

Lincoln Legion of Lesbians (LLL) was a lesbian feminist collective in Lincoln, Nebraska, that sought to destigmatize lesbianism and build lesbian community. The collective sponsored community events open exclusively to women and girls, advocating feminist separatism.

The collective is notable for initiating the first attempt to outlaw anti-gay discrimination in Nebraska in 1980. A fierce local backlash to this attempt expanded into a nationwide strategy of anti-LGBT rhetoric using pseudoscientific arguments.

== Organization and activities ==
The Lincoln Legion of Lesbians was organized by University of Nebraska–Lincoln (UNL) scholar Julia Penelope in 1976, according to LLL member Sarah Lucia Hoagland. Same-sex sexual activity was illegal in the state until 1978, and the LLL kept out of the public eye in its early years. Yet it was at the center of "a vibrant lesbian feminist community in Lincoln, Nebraska in the late 1970s."

LLL newsletter Lesbian Community News says that in a 1979 meeting, the collective chose to emerge as an "up-front" group that would speak openly of lesbian concerns and host public events. Among the founders at this meeting were Julia Penelope, and Mother Earth News chief editor Cheryl Long. The group's first event was a slide show by Tee Corinne called Images of Lesbian Sexuality in Art.

Members of the collective advocated for and practiced feminist separatism, attempting to exclude men from their lives to varying degrees. LLL frequently held events that were for women only or lesbians only. Men who were turned away from women-only LLL events sometimes clashed with LLL collective members in local media. One LLL member observed that separatism was "seen by men as a terrific act of insubordination."

Local press frequently covered LLL in the early 1980s because of the group's outspoken advocacy against discrimination and abuse of women. Julia Penelope took joy in her belief that the governor of Nebraska wanted the word "lesbian" to stop appearing on the front pages of Lincoln newspapers.

LLL funded itself by recycling aluminum cans and by selling lesbian photography to women. LLL disputed with Ms. magazine in the feminist press when the magazine refused to advertise the sale of notecards depicting lesbian sex. The organization sponsored all-women dances, brought lesbian performers to Lincoln, and met with officials on political and legal issues impacting lesbians and women. The collective offered social events into the early 1990s.

== Anti-discrimination campaign and backlash ==
An LLL sponsored event, the Third Midwest Feminist Conference, was scheduled for August 1980 at Camp Kataki, a YMCA summer camp near Omaha. Upon learning of the event's lesbian sponsorship the YMCA canceled its contract to host the conference, saying lesbianism was inconsistent with Kataki's purpose of "wholesome recreation and Christian fellowship".

Frustrated with the YMCA's discrimination against lesbians, the LLL asked Lincoln city government to outlaw discrimination based on sexual preference. Lincoln human rights commissioner Bob Kerrey and mayor Helen Boosalis supported the LLL's suggestion, but attorneys determined that the request exceeded city government authority.

LLL and other advocates proposed overcoming this problem by amending the city charter through a vote by Lincoln citizens. The proposed change to the charter, called "the gay rights amendment" in the Lincoln press, would have allowed the Lincoln city council to outlaw discrimination based on sexual orientation in housing and employment.

Opposition to the gay rights amendment was fierce — "a campaign marked by a great deal of fear, hysteria, and homophobia" in the words of LGBTQ archivist David Williams. A UNL psychologist, Paul Cameron, emerged as the leader of the homophobic campaign. Where most prior anti-gay rhetoric had appealed to religion and morality, Cameron pioneered pseudoscientific arguments against homosexuality, using his status as a psychologist to publish fraudulent research. Cameron was called "the most dangerous antigay voice in the United States" by The Advocate because his research was quickly adopted by the emerging Christian right in their opposition to gay rights nationwide.

LLL members worked to reduce homophobia in the voting public. Setting aside skepticism about working with men, the lesbian collective collaborated with the Nebraska Coalition for Gay and Lesbian Civil Rights to advocate for the gay rights amendment. Backlash to their efforts was more powerful than they projected; the amendment failed in a landslide in 1982, with 78% of Lincoln voters opposed to gay rights.

The campaign against Lincoln's gay rights amendment grew into a national-level hate group, the Family Research Institute, which still produces pseudoscience used by Focus on the Family and similar organizations. Since the decision of Bostock v. Clayton County in 2020, discrimination in housing or employment based on sexual orientation or gender identity has been illegal in Nebraska.
