= Lady-Unique-Inclination-of-the-Night =

American feminist periodical from 1976 until 1983

- Cover of the last issue (Cycle 6). Image retrieved from addressesproject.com/memory/kay-turner
- Editor: Kar Turner
- Publisher: Sowing Circle Press
- First issue: 1976
- Final issue: Autumn 1983
- Based in: New Brunswick, N.J.

Lady-Unique-Inclination-of-the-Night was an American feminist periodical from 1976 until 1983. Founded and edited by Kay Turner, the journal primarily wrote on feminist art, history and performance with a particular focus on women's spirituality.

Turner says that the magazine's logo was inspired by Ixchel, the Mayan Moon Goddess. "Inclining towards night" in the periodical's title refers to Ixchel, in her aspect of the waning moon, going into darkness.

The magazine referred to each issue as "cycles," and according to Turner, each cycle took a lot of effort. All the covers were hand silkscreened and the first three cycles were mostly done by hand. The last cycle, which was about women's altars, was produced differently from the rest. Describing her team's process for the sixth cycle, Turner explains:

"We made fifteen-hundred individual altars and affixed them to the cover of each journal and so you lift up your little altar and then underneath it is this printed image of a very ancient Mycenaean altar."

Apart from the 1,500 unique copies of the last issue, the magazine in general took a lot of work. And so, Lady Unique only lasted for a total of six cycles.

The magazine came up along with other feminist publications during its time such as Chrysalis, HERESIES, and WomanSpirit.
