= New England Female Moral Reform Society =

Historical entity

The New England Female Moral Reform Society was originally called the Boston Female Moral Reform Society at the time it was founded in 1835. The group changed their name in 1838 in response to a rivalry with the New York Female Moral Reform Society for support among women in auxiliary societies. The goal of the New England Female Moral Reform Society, as well as the other moral reform societies at the time, was to prevent prostitution and to end the sexual double standard. In 1844 the society opened a home for reformed prostitutes. In the first volume of their semi-monthly periodical, the society asserted that men and women were equally liable for the immoral sexual actions that they performed together.

== Nineteenth-century moral reform ==
Northern women in the 1830s were a part of a rising middle class during a period of Protestant religious revival known as the Second Great Awakening. Shaping their place in the emerging middle class, women sought to reform society in order to create an environment where they were valued and respected. Simultaneously, those influenced by the Second Great Awakening were focused on creating a more heavenly America by eradicating immoral practices. Women were able to address both of these goals through the moral reform movement, which marked the first social movement in which women predominated. Moral reform was a female cause that spurred the creation of primarily female organizations. Like most social movements at this time, the movement organized gendered groups. By 1841 there were about 50,000 women in 616 local moral reform societies in the North, including the New England Moral Reform Society. While the two most notable moral reform societies were urban, the auxiliary groups that formed in rural areas did an immense amount of work for the movement and consisted of a large majority of the women in the movement.

== Publications ==
One of the primary means of spreading the New England Female Moral Reform Society's message was through the publication of a semi-monthly periodical, called Friend of Virtue. The first volume of this periodical was published in 1838 and was edited by the society's secretary, Rebecca Eaton. This publication was a way to spread the ideas of the movement to small towns and cities throughout New England. It urged the women in those areas to organize groups of their own in order to fight for the cause. Through Friend of Virtue, the society spoke out against immoral actions and events, warned women of the deception of men, and told stories about immoral women to belabor their beliefs.

== See also ==
- New York Female Moral Reform Society
- Second Great Awakening
- Reform Movement
