= American Female Guardian Society =

American reformist organization, founded 1849

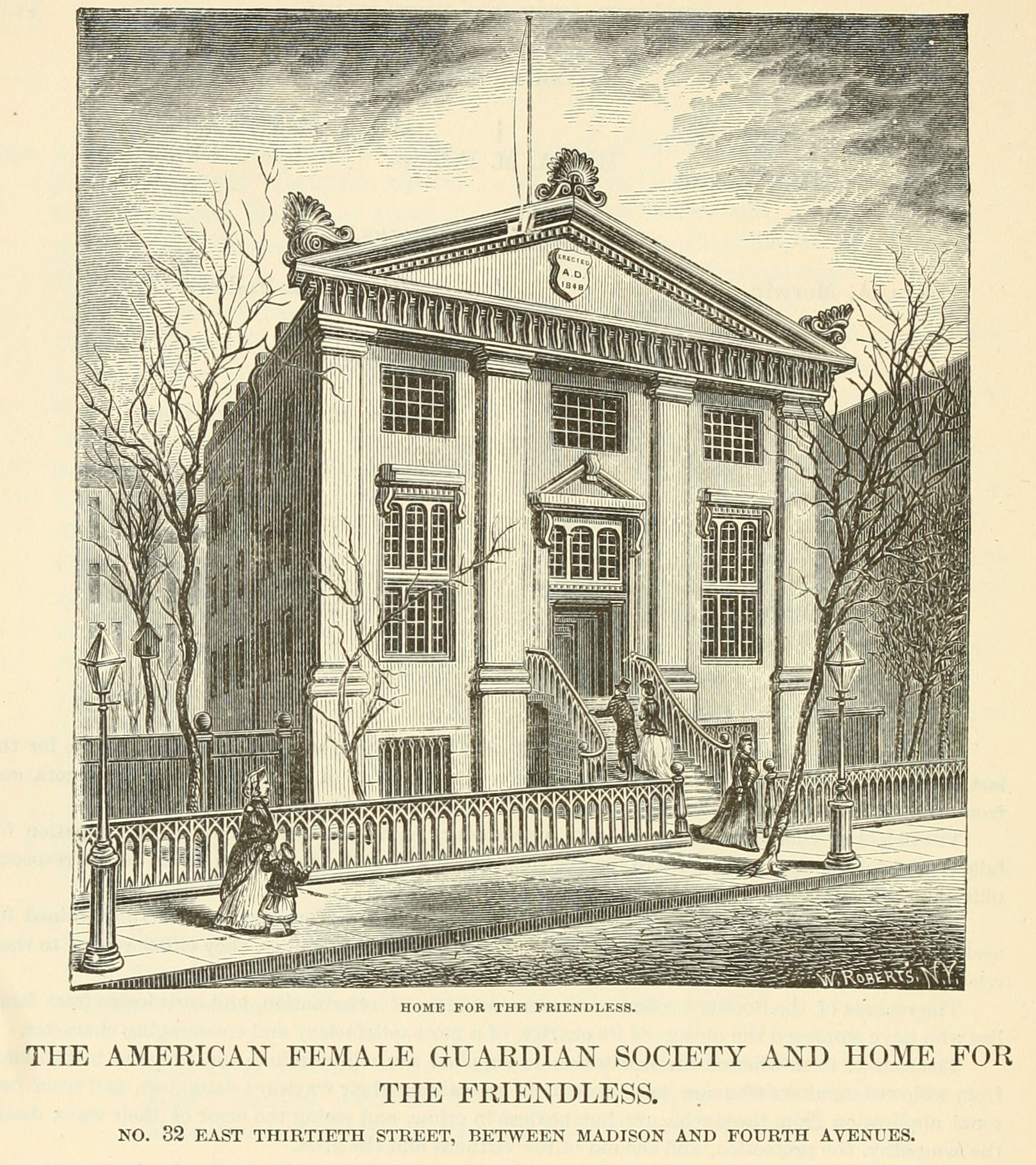
Home for the Friendless, 32 East 30th Street

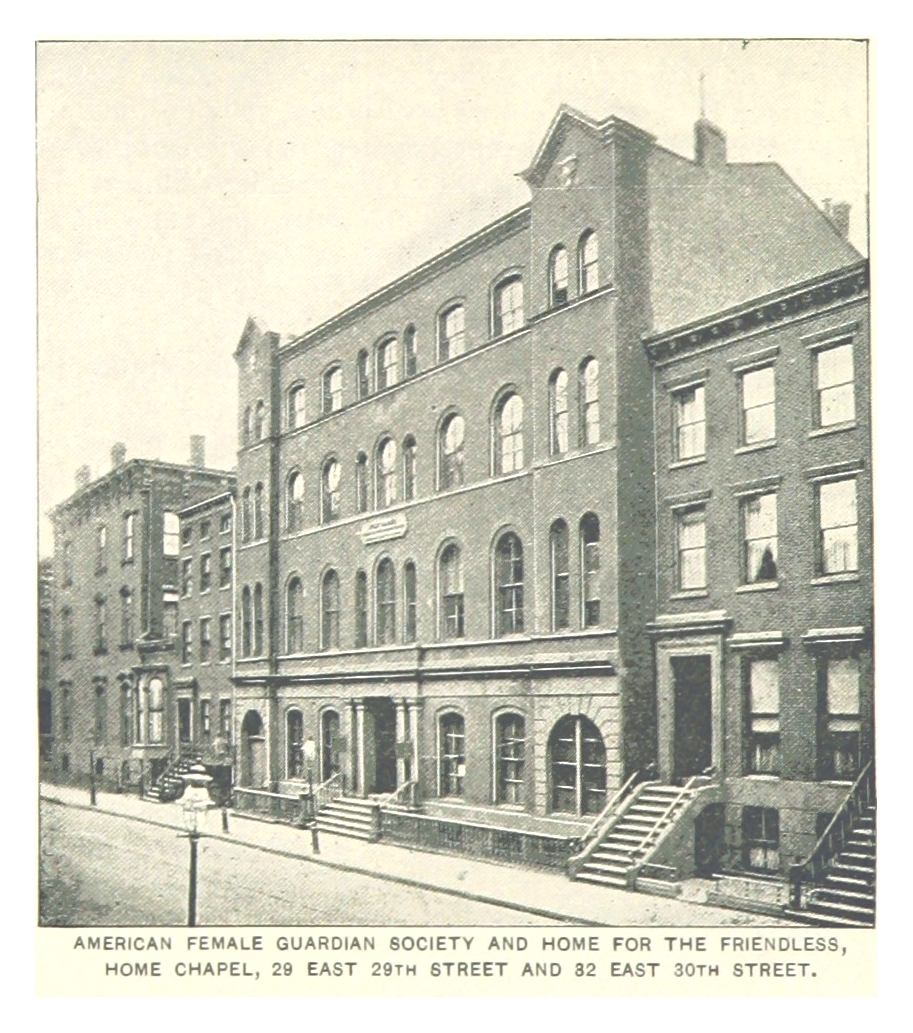
Home Chapel, 29 East 29th Street and 82 East 30th Street

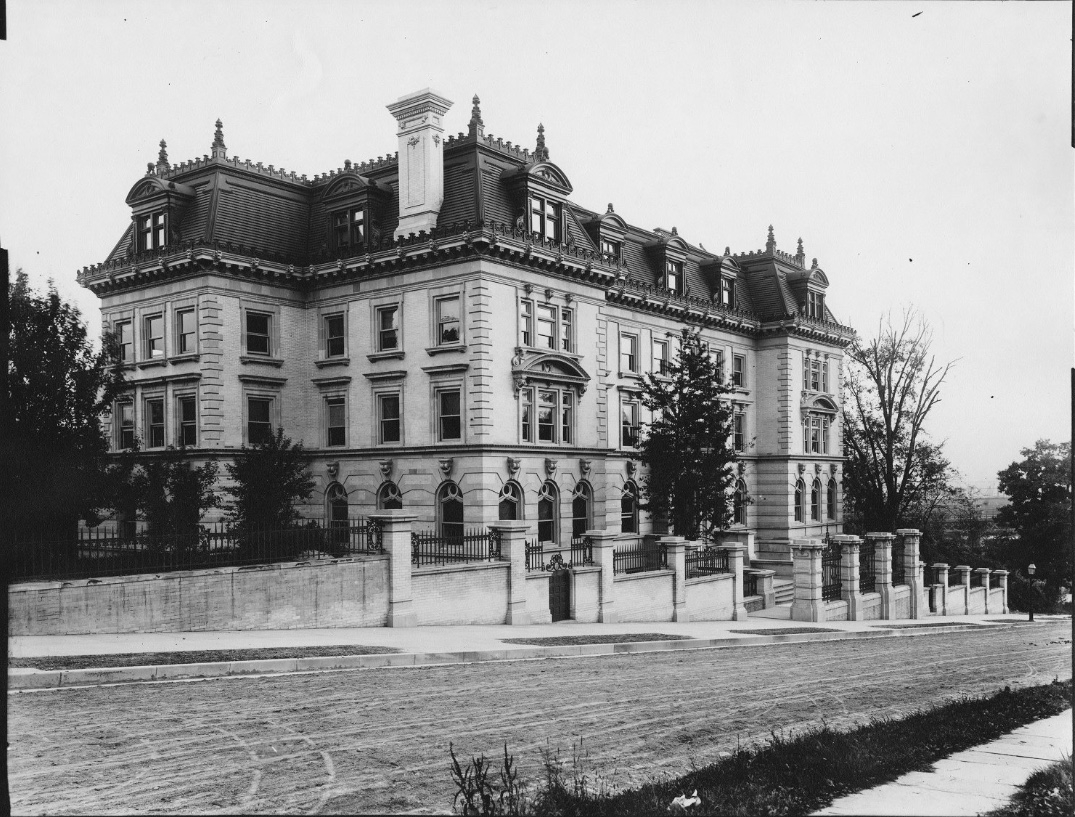
Woody Crest Home, 936 Woodycrest Avenue, The Bronx

The American Female Guardian Society (full name, American Female Guardian Society and Home for the Friendless) was an American prototype civic improvement association and a pioneer child-saving institution. Incorporated in 1849, and based in New York City, it was an outgrowth of the New York Female Moral Reform Society. The Society existed until at least 1941 when its official organ, Advocate and Family Guardian ceased operation.

The aims of the Society were to rescue homeless children, and to secure for them permanent country homes in Christian families. Many thousands of homeless children were thus been provided for. It provided shelter for indigent women and served as an employment agency on their behalf. It provided education to women and children living in slums.

The Society had no endowment, but was mainly sustained by charitable contributions, and donations of clothing and provisions. Its work was limited only by the amount of donations received. It sustained twelve Industrial Schools, in destitute sections of the city, in which between 5,000 and 6,000 children of the poorest class were gathered. Besides the primary branches of an English education, the girls were taught sewing, cooking, housekeeping, and the boys carpentry. The Society had an Employment Aid Department, where work was provided for many aged women, who were otherwise kindly cared for.

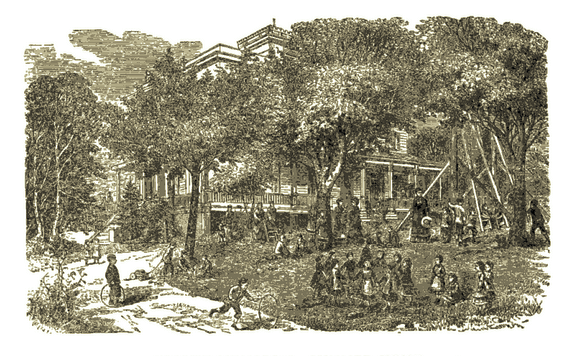
Wright Memorial, summer home

The children's summer home at Oceanport, New Jersey known as John D. Wright Memorial Home, was the summer retreat of the juvenile inmates of the Home. The Advocate and Family Guardian, the official organ of the Society, was a semi-monthly journal, published by the executive committee, at 29 East 29th Street.
