= Primavera (magazine) =

American feminist magazine based in Chicago

- Editor: Ruth Young
- Frequency: Annual
- Publisher: Salsedo Press
- First issue: 1975
- Final issue: 2006
- Country: United States
- Based in: Chicago, Illinois
- ISSN: 0364-7609

Primavera was an American feminist magazine based in Chicago, Illinois from 1975 to 2006. Established by Janet Ruth Heller, Celia Josephson, and Deborah Gordon Fisher, the magazine contained poetry, illustrations, fiction, and photography. It was most notable for its lack of political content—they concerned themselves more with content that reflected on women’s experiences.

Often described as "A Unique Woman's Magazine," Primavera garnered praise from other publications such as Off Our Backs, Chicago Magazine, and Library Journal. It published annually and often depended on submissions.

The magazine's editor, Ruth Young, became involved with Primavera while she was still working as a managing editor for the Bulletin of the Atomic Scientists. It has been said that Young kept the magazine alive. Lisa Grayson, a friend and a fellow colleague of Ruth Young at Primavera said that Young "did everything from sending out issues to libraries to dealing with printers," and "read every manuscript that came over the transom."
