= Onyx: Black Lesbian Newsletter =

Magazine focusing on black lesbian life and culture

- Editor: Laverne Gagehabib, A. C. Barber, Vivienne Walker-Crawford
- Categories: Lesbian
- Frequency: Bimonthly
- First issue: 1982
- Final issue: 1984
- Country: United States
- Based in: Berkeley, California
- Language: English
- OCLC: 69262012

Cover of the June/July 1983 edition of Onyx. Illustration by Sarita Johnson.

Onyx: Black Lesbian Newsletter was a bimonthly magazine focusing on Black lesbian life and culture. Originally titled Black Lesbian Newsletter, Onyx was based in Berkeley from 1982 to 1984. It was created by Laverne Gagehabib, A.C. Barber, and Vivienne Walker-Crawford. The newsletter contained fiction pieces, opinion articles, news, reviews, poems, personal ads, art, and photographs. Onyx was the earliest of the three San Francisco Bay Area publications which focused on Black lesbian life and culture, the others being Aché: A Journal for Lesbians of African Descent and Issues! The Magazine for Lesbians of Color. Onyx covers were illustrated by Sarita Johnson. Its editors included Marlene Bonner.

== Laverne Gagehabib ==
Since the end of Onyx Laverne has published four books. The Blacksmith and the Doctor, The Doctors and Their Wives, and Jonny and Vera. One of the most prominent works being Circles of Power:Shifting Dynamics in a Lesbian-centered Community in collaboration with Barbara Summerhawk. The book is a study on Southern Oregon women's community. All of the books seem to have limited physical copies making them difficult to find.

== See also ==
- List of lesbian periodicals
- List of lesbian periodicals in the United States
- Black lesbian literature in the United States
