= Marilyn Salzman Webb =

American journalist

Marilyn Salzman Webb (born October 26, 1942), also known as Marilyn Webb, is an American author, activist, professor, feminist and journalist. She has been involved in the civil rights, feminist, anti-Vietnam war and end-of-life care movements, and is considered one of the founders of the Second-wave women's liberation movement.

Webb holds a PhD in educational psychology from the University of Chicago - successfully awarded 50 years after sexual harassment derailed her from first receiving it. She pursued her undergraduate education at Brandeis University, graduating with a BA in 1964. Later she studied at the Columbia University Graduate School of Journalism and completed her MS degree in 1981. She had begun studies for her PhD in educational psychology at the University of Chicago in 1964, but left with only the compensatory master's degree in 1967, when her doctorate was nearly completed. After finishing her coursework and passing her preliminary examinations, she abandoned her degree after facing sexual harassment and sexual assault by professors she asked to serve on her dissertation committee. Fifty years later, she contacted administrators, who — after due diligence — welcomed her to finish her dissertation and awarded her a PhD in June 2019.

Webb has had a five decades-long career in journalism and is the author of the acclaimed book, The Good Death: The New American Search to Research the End of Life (Bantam Books, 1997 and 1998), and co-editor (with poet Anne Waldman) of two historic book collections of talks by Beat poets and artists, Talking Poetics from Naropa Institute: Annals of the Jack Kerouac School of Disembodied Poetics, Volume One, and Volume Two (both Shambhala Publications, 1979). She was also an editor-in-chief of Psychology Today, a senior editor at Woman's Day, McCall's, and US Magazine, a writer for New York Magazine, and a daily newspaper reporter. Her pieces have appeared in multiple other publications, including The Village Voice, Ladies Home Journal, Family Circle, Cosmopolitan, Glamour, Harper's Bazaar, Ms. Magazine, Child Magazine, Parade, The New York Times and USA Today, as well as in numerous book anthologies.

== Feminism ==
Webb was the co-founder of the first feminist consciousness-raising groups in both Chicago (1966) and in Washington, D.C. (1967). She co-organized the early national Sandy Springs and Lake Villa women's liberation conferences. As a feminist leader, she faced New Left male chauvinism when she spoke to introduce the fledgling women's movement on January 20, 1970, to 10,000+ participants at an anti-war rally against President Richard M. Nixon's inauguration. She and feminist Shulamith Firestone were booed off the protest stage, met by cat calls, derogatory words, and a near crowd riot. Her focus then shifted to Second-Wave feminism and a crucial national decision ensued to separate women's movement organizing from the larger New Left.

As a young feminist in the winter of 1970, Webb co-founded off our backs ("oob"), one of the first of the Second Wave feminist newspapers to appear. It began publishing on February 27, 1970, predating MS Magazine by two years, and was continually published for the next 38 years. By the time publishing ceased in 2008, oob was "the only early feminist journal continuously publishing after four decades," and the longest surviving feminist publication in American history. In fall 1970, Webb left oob and co-founded, directed, and taught in one of the first college-based women's studies programs on an American campus, at Goddard College in Plainfield, Vermont. In 1975, she co-founded Sagaris, a feminist think-tank, that grew out of the Goddard program.

Webb was profiled in early feminist movement days in Esquire magazine, Ramparts magazine, The Washington Star Sunday Magazine, and has since featured in many core books and movies on the New Left and/or the women's movement, including In Our Time, The World Split Open, Daring to Be Bad, The Sixties, Outlaw Woman, Jewish Radical Feminism: Voices from the Women's Liberation Movement, For Women Only, Freedom for Women, Young Radicals, Generation on Fire, Rebels with a Cause, the movie She's Beautiful When She's Angry, and others.

== Journalism ==
As a journalist, Webb has written countless articles on numerous subjects, over many decades. The most influential likely include: "Becoming the Men We Wanted to Marry," (Village Voice), "The Art of Dying," and "The Hospice Way of Death" (New York Magazine), "A Lover's Story: Dr. Kevorkian and the Death of Tom Hyde" (Glamour), "Special Report on Kevorkian Families" (Ladies Home Journal), and Op Ed pieces on hospice and Medicare (The New York Times) and assisted suicide (USA Today).

In addition to Goddard College, Webb has taught at Columbia University's Graduate School of Journalism in New York City, and at Knox College, in Galesburg, Illinois. There she began a journalism program based on the work of the muckrakers, primarily those published in McClure's Magazine, a turn-of-the 20th century progressive periodical published by S. S. McClure — a famed Knox College alumnus — who showcased investigations by Progressive Era journalists Ida Tarbell, Lincoln Steffens, Ray Stannard Baker, and others. Webb now holds the title of Knox College Distinguished Professor Emerita of Journalism. As part of Knox College's Journalism program, Webb directed students in publishing award-winning articles in professional newspapers, including the March 2011 series, "Maytag Employees in Transition," a 17-part investigation printed in the Galesburg Register-Mail on the five-year aftermath of the closure of the local Maytag Refrigeration Plant. The series won first place awards in both the Illinois Press Association and the Illinois Associated Press Editors Association, plus the coveted Sweepstakes Award for best reporting, all in competition statewide with professional journalists and newspapers.

When The Good Death: The New American Search to Reshape the End of Life was published in 1999, it garnered multiple laudatory book reviews — including those in The New York Times, the Washington Post, Kirkus Reviews, and Publishers Weekly. Webb subsequently began a two-year national stint of speaking and organizing to improve care of the dying, giving keynote addresses to medical, social work, church-based and community groups across the country, as well as granting nearly two hundred, newspaper, radio, and TV interviews.

== Political activism ==
At Brandeis, Webb was inspired by professors Eleanor Roosevelt and Herbert Marcuse, by visiting speakers Malcolm X and Tom Hayden, and by Martin Luther King Jr.'s "I Have a Dream" speech when she went to the 1963 March on Washington for Jobs and Freedom. In Chicago, Webb was involved with community organizing, civil rights, and the anti-war movements while she was a young graduate student. In 1965, she co-founded and directed one of the first national pilot programs for Head Start pre-schools. This school — in the predominantly Black Woodlawn area — was modeled on the Mississippi Summer Freedom Schools, with parent participation as a core element led by Rosie Simpson, a key leader of the famed 1963 Chicago Public Schools boycott. An affiliate of the Student Woodlawn Area Project (SWAP), the pre-school was a fulcrum for community organizing. She also became director of a second pre-school, this one part of Saul Alinsky's The Woodlawn Organization (TWO). Webb was an early member of Students for a Democratic Society (SDS) and part of a Chicago anti-war group. In 1967, she directed the educational arm of Vietnam Summer, a national effort against the war. She organized high school teachers across the country to teach about the war and helped establish a school curriculum on Vietnam for classroom use.

After leaving the University of Chicago, and after founding the women's consciousness raising group in Hyde Park, Chicago, Webb moved to Washington, D.C. and in 1967 founded the first women's liberation group there and joining the Students for a Democratic Society. The D.C. group grew to include other consciousness raising groups, and developed an educational outreach component, an abortion counseling service, and a speakers' bureau. In 1968, she co-organized both the seminal Sandy Springs and Lake Villa women's conferences while she also helped develop D.C. Women's Liberation as an organization, renting an office space and forming Magic Quilt, the group's innovative governing body. On January 20, 1969, Webb was tapped to be a lead speaker for women's liberation at the large demonstration during the inauguration of President Nixon, but she and other women were booed off a protest stage. She then helped encourage feminists to organize independently of the New Left. In January 1970, Webb and six others from D.C. Women's Liberation disrupted Sen. Gaylord Nelson's U.S. Senate's Committee Hearings on the safety of the birth control pill, charging that there were no women on the committee, no women doctors or scientists testifying, and no women speaking at the hearings who had used the pill. Their protests garnered much press attention, but also led to decreased dosages of estrogen in the pill and the inauguration of a vital women's healthcare movement. That was the same year she also co-founded oob and also began the women's studies program at Goddard.

Years of research as an investigative journalist culminated in her book The Good Death, published in 1997, on medical and legal controversies surrounding end-of-life care in the US. She spent the following several years speaking to medical, religious, and lay groups about how to improve care, and served on the boards of the Hospice Foundation, publicizing hospice care, and Compassion in Dying (now Compassion & Choices), which promotes legalizing medical aid-in-dying.

She sees connections between her work as a young feminist and her work on end-of-life care, as she explained in an interview with Kathy Rand of the Veteran Feminists of America, "Take medical care and childbirth, for instance, taking control of your birthing process, using midwives, having guaranteed childcare are issues that are all now applicable to women regarding medical decision making and care at the end of life. There are still also the same enemies, whether it is doctors who want to stay in control of medical decision-making, or those who want to disallow aid-in-dying or having Medicare cover homecare." And because women tend to do the most caregiving for others and then also live longer, they often end up without enough money for the caregiving they need late in life, she said. "Feminism raised these issues early in life and they persist over our lifetimes in the exact same way but in different circumstances."

In 2001, she founded the journalism program at Knox College; she holds the title Distinguished Professor Emerita of Journalism. She had previously founded the women's studies program at Goddard College and taught in the journalism program at Columbia University.

In 2009, Webb ran for mayor of Galesburg, Illinois.

Webb is featured in the documentary She's Beautiful When She's Angry.

== Personal life and education ==
Webb was born in Brooklyn, New York, on October 26, 1942, to a middle-class Jewish family that included Russian Jewish social justice seekers on her mother's side, and conservative German-Austrian Jews on her father's side. They lived in an apartment building in the Flatbush section of Brooklyn until she was nine years old, when her parents moved her and her younger sister, Netta, to a suburban housing development in Elmont, Long Island.

Before she married, her mother, Esther Wein Salzman (Halpert) had been a salesclerk at Hearn's Department Store in New York City and co-organizer of the first department store union to be granted bargaining privileges in that city. Webb's father, William ('Bill") Salzman, was an illustrator training to work for his uncle, Charles Mintz, one of the first animated film producers and the first employer of Walt Disney. Then Mintz and Disney had a falling out, Mintz suddenly died of a heart attack, and her father ended up manufacturing underwear with another uncle in New York's garment business.

Webb began elementary school at P. S. 181 in Brooklyn, finished in Elmont and graduated from Elmont Memorial Junior-Senior High School in 1960. She described her childhood in an interview for the Veteran Feminists of America's oral history web site.

"I was a typical suburban kid. I rode my bike around the neighborhood, in high school I was a cheerleader because it was the only sport that women could do at the time, and I was very athletic. It turned out that in the culture wars of high schools, cheerleaders were stereotyped as airheads, but I was also in the honors classes, a separate educational track at the time, and I wrote for the school newspaper, so I embraced a lot of different subgroups, and tried to keep them separate so I could fit in each one."

Webb's younger sister, Netta, died in 1959 after a three-year illness. In those three years that her family focused on her ill sister, Webb developed a strong separate life, reporting for the school newspaper and reading Nancy Drew books and biographies of future role models like Marie Curie, Eleanor Roosevelt, and Lincoln Steffens. Her dream was to be a girl detective like Nancy Drew, a star reporter like comic strip heroine, Brenda Starr, and a real-life reporter like Lincoln Steffens. Webb has said in interviews that her feminism began after being rejected from Little League at age nine because she was a girl, and after being kicked out of summer camp when she was caught kissing a boy behind the tennis courts. She was outraged by both events but was particularly irked that nothing happened to the boy she had been kissing before she was kicked out.

Webb's father died in 1963 of a heart attack. Her family was thrown into chaos and she finished college at Brandeis on a scholarship and by selling sandwiches at nights in the women's dorms. Webb has said it taught her abruptly about social class, and she found herself labeled "lowly." Awareness of class divisions stayed with her for the rest of her life.

In 1967, she married Lee Webb, who was the national secretary of SDS, and in 1970 their daughter, Jennifer Brooke Stanton Webb, was born in Washington, D.C., and named after First Wave feminist Elizabeth Cady Stanton. They subsequently moved to Vermont to teach at Goddard College and later divorced.

In 1975, Webb moved to Boulder, Colorado, where she studied Tibetan Buddhism, worked at Naropa Institute (now Naropa University) and with her teacher, Chögyam Trungpa, Rinpoche. She edited two books on the Beat Poets and artists who taught at Naropa (among them, Allen Ginsberg, William Burroughs, Diane Di Prima and John Cage) and was a reporter for the Boulder Daily Camera. In 1980, Webb moved back to New York, where she continued her long career as a writer and editor.

In 1993, Webb married John Sheedy Jr., a retired executive at Bristol-Myers, Vice Chairman of Corporate Executives Against the War in Vietnam.
