= Maenad: A Women's Literary Journal =

American feminist periodical (1980-83)

Maenad
- Editor: Paula Estey, Jean Rdoslovich
- First issue: 1980
- Country: United States
- Based in: Gloucester, Massachusetts
- ISSN: 0275-5629

Maenad: A Women’s Literary Journal was an American feminist periodical published in Gloucester, Massachusetts in the early 1980s. The magazine's content primarily included feminist critical essays, visual arts, and creative writing. It also regularly featured book reviews, letters to the editors, and advertisements to other feminist publications such as HERESIES. Maenad ceased publication after a few years.

It has been said that the periodical's title was inspired by the Maenads from Greek mythology. Much like the female "frenzied" followers of the Greek god Dionysus, Maenad: A Women's Literary Journal expresses both "anger and inspiration in the complexion of its pages."

The magazine often advised their contributors in their submission guidelines:

"We are looking for controversial and radical feminism ideas and theories, including lesbian and third world manuscripts. Our areas of concern are large: factual and theoretical articles, biographical and historical work, fiction, reviews, criticism and compiled bibliographies."

Maenad featured works from various feminists such as Adrienne Rich, Zita N. Dressner, and Elaine Wing.

In 1983, Maenad closed due to a lack of funding and debt.
