= Women's International Network News =

American feminist newsletter in Massachusetts

- Publisher: Women's International Network
- First issue: January 1975
- Final issue: September 2003
- Country: United States
- Based in: Lexington, Massachusetts
- Language: English
- Website: https://feminist.com/win.htm
- ISSN: 0145-7985

Women's International Network (WIN) News was an American feminist newsletter published in Lexington, Massachusetts from 1975 until 2003. The publication wrote news articles and segments about women and health, media, environment, violence, human rights, development, and much more. The newsletter listed international career opportunities for women, as well as published direct reports from around the world.

According to the publication's first issue, purpose of WIN News is:

"To establish a world-wide open communication system by, for and about women of all backgrounds, beliefs, nationalities, and age-groups. To serve the general public, institutions and organisations by transmitting internationally information about women and women's-groups."
