= Sunbury (magazine) =

- Editor: Virginia Scott
- Format: Print
- Publisher: Sunbury Press
- ISSN: 0271-3217
- OCLC: 3470343

Sunbury: A Poetry Magazine was an American feminist magazine published and edited by Virginia Scott in Bronx, New York. The periodical was devoted to promoting the marginalized works of women, blue-collar, and minority poets. Apart from poetry, the magazine also published fiction, interviews, and reviews.

Sunbury published three times a year and has been by praised by other feminist publications such as Majority Report:

"The quality of the poetry in Sunbury is high, high enough for a first-rate anthology, let alone for a poetry magazine published three times a year."

== Writers published by Sunbury: ==
- Ursula K. Le Guin
- Mary TallMountain
- Linda Hogan
- Andrew Salkey
- Paula Gunn Allen
- Brenda Connor-Bey
- Bob Bohm
- Joan Lupo Batista
- Harryette Mullen
- Thom Lee
- Yuri Kageyama
- Teresa Anderson
- Margaret Randall
- David Henderson
- Meridel Le Sueur
- Sandra Esteves
- Thoman McGrath
- Manna Lowenfels-Perpelitt
- Steven Cannon
- Victor Hernandez Cruz
- Regina de Cormier-Shekerjian
- Mashadi Mashabela
- Hettie Jones
- Grace Paley
