= Dykes & Gorgons =

American lesbian feminist magazine (1973-76)

- Vol. 1, Issue 1 cover
- Publisher: Gutter Dyke Collective, East Bay Queers
- First issue: May 1973
- Final issue: 1976
- Country: USA
- Based in: Berkeley, California
- ISSN: 2573-6183
- OCLC: 213859226

Dykes & Gorgons was a lesbian feminist and lesbian-separatist magazine founded in 1973 in Berkeley, California. Its publication ended in 1976.

== History ==
The publication was critical of racism and classism within the lesbian-feminist movement, critiqued male-dominated socialist groups, and opposed the presence of trans women in lesbian organizations. Dykes & Gorgons also encouraged lesbian-feminists to reject traditional femininity, advocating that women reject restrictive female clothing and cut their hair short as an expression of feminism and lesbian visibility: "The time has come to stop blending in with the 'feminized' masses of women, to stop being that invisible minority." Many members of Dykes & Gorgons chose to reject submissive femininity by eschewing purses, blouses, and heels, wearing practical clothing instead, often men's clothing, such as Levi jeans with pockets and men's boots. One member explained that the intent was to empower women rather than imitate men: "It wasn't a masculine image I was keeping. It was convenience and practicality. The clothes I wear help me to know my own power."

Autostraddle described Dykes & Gorgons as a lesbian-feminist publication which had "faded into obscurity or barely breathed at all, unfortunately", "particularly tragic" because Dykes & Gorgons had an "amazing name".

Dykes & Gorgons has been digitized and added to the digital collections of Bryn Mawr College.

== See also ==
- Lesbian literature
- List of lesbian periodicals in the United States
