= New York Female Moral Reform Society =

19th century social organization in United States

The New York Female Moral Reform Society (NYFMRS) was an American reformism organization based in New York. It was established in 1834 under the leadership of Lydia A. Finney, wife of revivalist Charles Grandison Finney. The NYFMRS was created for the fundamental purpose of preventing prostitution in early 19th century New York. It launched its official organ, Advocate of moral reform (later renamed Advocate and Family Guardian) in 1835.

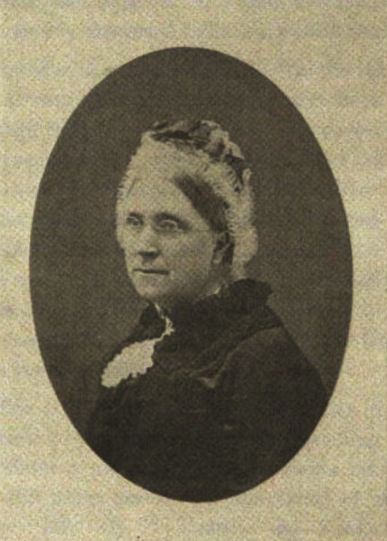
Sarah R. Ingraham Bennett, editor, Advocate and Family Guardian

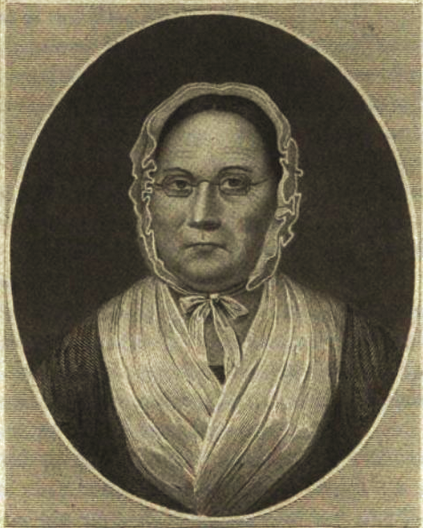
Margaret Prior, first missionary, New York Female Moral Reform Society

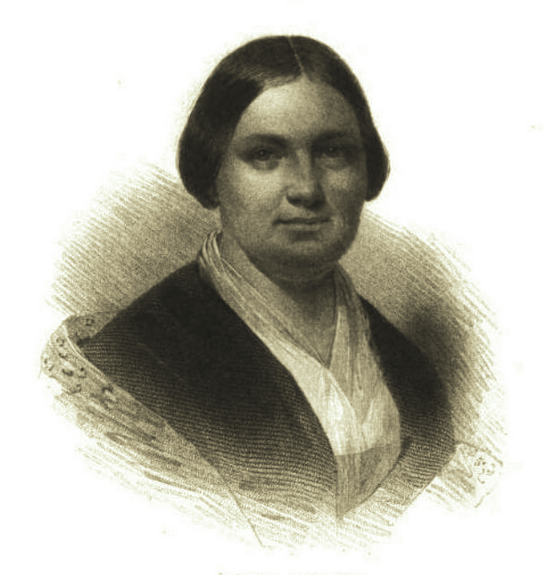
Mary Anne Hawkins, president, American Female Moral Reform Society

In time, the NYFMRS became one of the most well-known moral reform organizations of the period and even expanded its influence to other cities across America. Five years after its establishment, the NYFMRS already had 445 auxiliaries, and thus changed its name in 1839 to the American Female Moral Reform Society in the hopes that membership would expand even further. This name change came just a year after the Boston Female Moral Reform Society became the New England Female Moral Reform Society due to a growing rivalry for support among auxiliary societies in the Northeast.

By 1840, the society's goals evolved and with it came a name change to the American Female Guardian Society.

== Goals ==
Prostitution first became a problem in America between 1810 and 1820, primarily because it was not completely illegal, thus it is estimated that 5 to 10 percent of women were prostitutes. Women soon discovered that prostitution paid more than any other kind of work available to them at the time, and even some kinds of employment were linked to prostitution. A report by the NYFMRS in the 1830s found that servants, chambermaids, and milliners were the most common occupations linked with prostitution. With estimates of more than ten thousand prostitutes in the city it can be understood that some women simply turned to prostitution out of necessity from the strains of their economic and environmental situations.

Moral reform became a prominent issue in the U.S. during the 1830s and 1840s and many organizations were created during this time to eliminate prostitution and the sexual double standard, and to also encourage sexual abstinence. While some organizations tried to reclaim women who had fallen into prostitution, moral reform societies like NYFMRS were convinced that prevention was their primary concern. Women involved in the New York Female Benevolent Society, who tended to be older women, were more willing to help prostitutes out of their situation.

== Reform strategies ==
The NYFMRS attempted many strategies in preventing prostitution from occurring. Some of these strategies included entering brothels and praying for the prostitutes and their clients, lobbying the state to make male solicitation of prostitutes a crime and threatening to publish names in their monthly journal of the men who regularly visited brothels. Through time the NYFMRS took on new missions, primarily by relaxing their focus on prevention and opening up to the idea of homes for the friendless, offering education to those women in need and opening up an employment agency to help some respectable women.

== Notable people ==
- Lydia A. Finney
- Margaret Prior
