= Women & Literature =

American feminist scholarly journal

- A Women & Literature advertisement found in the second issue of the HERESIES magazine.
- Categories: Literature, Film, Feminism
- Frequency: Irregular
- Format: Print
- Publisher: Holmes & Meier Publishers, Inc.
- Founder: Janet M. Todd
- Founded: 1974
- Final issue: 1988
- Country: United States
- Language: English
- ISSN: 0147-1759

Women & Literature was an American feminist scholarly journal. Janet Margaret Todd, a British academic and author, founded the journal around the 1970s while she was teaching at Rutgers University. Women & Literature wrote about feminist film and literature and sought to support the feminist work of the 1970s. It advertised itself as “a scholarly journal of women writers and the literary treatment of women”. Issues included articles on women writers such as Jane Austen, Charlotte Bronte, and Mary Leadbeater.

Adrienne Rich, an influential American feminist poet, praised the publication after one of its issues, "Women and Film": “No one who pretends to a sound, broad, genuinely human scholarship can afford to remain ignorant of the work Women & Literature is now making available”.

== Volumes ==
- Volume 1: Gender and Literary Voice (1980)
- Volume 2: Men by Women (1981)
- Volume 3: Jane Austen: New Perspectives (1983)
- Volume 4: Women and Film (1988)
