= DYKE: A Quarterly of Lesbian Culture and Analysis =

1970s American lesbian separatist magazine

DYKE: A Quarterly of Lesbian Culture and Analysis was a New York-based lesbian separatist magazine published by Tomato Publications. The magazine was active from 1975 to 1979. Liza Cowan and Penny House created the periodical, functioning as the publishers and editors during its run.

DYKE only distributed through women's outlets and by mail, making clear that they were not interested in selling to men or straight women. The magazine's staff and collaborators were mostly lesbians. The majority of the articles were written by lesbians, printed by a lesbian print shop, and their advertisers were primarily lesbian feminists.

Despite having a relatively small audience while active, DYKE, A Quarterly did well by alternative press standards and was well known and considered controversial by many. Over time, the magazine became increasingly popular and is today considered to be a key feminist periodical for the lesbian separatist and feminist movement. Additionally, the design and name of the magazine was influential and contributed to lesbian aesthetics and the development of "Dyke," as a facet of lesbian identity.

== Context and history ==
Liza Cowan and Penny house were born into Jewish families in New York City and grew up close together. In the early 1970s, after both had come out as lesbians, the duo began to learn about the women's liberation movement – their political philosophies evolved until finding their permanent alignments with dyke or lesbian separatism.

Liza got started in the world of business first by creating feminist buttons, a business which she considered to be successful. She became increasingly engaged with feminist and lesbian media and business – producing radio entertainment for WBAI FM and co-editing a lesbian feminist periodical titled COWRIE in 1972 which ran for five issues. When starting COWRIE, Liza Cowan had originally hoped to found a women's center with the other contributors of what was at the time just a newsletter. After her venture with COWRIE, DYKE: A Quarterly began. Liza was self-taught and learned her craft by studying other alternative and popular magazines which are reflected in the aesthetics of DYKE.

Liza Cowan and Penny House got to work on DYKE in January 1975. Ten months later, the first issue was published. The cause for this endeavor has been cited by Liza Cowan as a response to a gap in the market for exclusively lesbian periodical literature.

== Editorial content ==
The magazine revolved around radical feminism and lesbian politics. DYKE: A Quarterly featured articles on lesbian "theoretical politics, live events, places, current and past history, media, fashions, music, home economics, literature, animal lore, health, applied sciences and gossip." Seeking out to capture the historical, social and cultural moment of the time, the magazine took a radical stance on lesbian feminism. The platform that developed allowed for unfiltered lesbian voices to be expressed, promoting diverse and uncensored discourse within the lesbian and feminist subcultures of 1970s America. Two terms that often come up when discussing DYKE, A Quarterly are "personal," and "political."

A primary political stance that influenced the editorial content is that lesbian culture mandates a separatist partial position and results in separatist analysis. The philosophy was that this exclusivity would promote freedom from fear of negative social sanctions within the communication network of DYKE, allowing lesbian feminists engaging with DYKE to express themselves as freely as possible.

Citing inspiration from popular press such as Vogue, People, LIFE, The New York Times, and more, the editorial content of DYKE, A Quarterly drew from many of these publications. They wrote articles from how to dress like a "dyke," to how to come out of the closet. They created and featured a significant amount of art by lesbians as well as controversial political analysis.

== Origin of the name ==
The title DYKE was cited by Liza as a spoof of the title LIFE magazine, whose design also inspired the second issue of DYKE. This spoof is also reflected in the iconography and general design of DYKE, A Quarterly.

== Discontinuation ==
In a letter from the editors in 1979, DYKE announces the end of its publication. Reasons for discontinuing were cited as: high costs of production due to the quality of materials, small circulation, advertisements, and the name of the publication – which deterred many potential readers.

== Since 1979 ==
DYKE has continued to be the subject of study, featured in art books, and remembered as an important part of the second wave feminist movement and lesbian culture.

=== Gay Gotham: art and underground culture in New York ===
In 2016, Skira Rizolli Publications, Inc., for The Museum of the City of New York, published an art book titled Gay Gotham: Art and Underground Culture in New York. In the section titled 1969–1993 Out New York, DYKE, A Quarterly is featured, going over the history of the periodical and displaying full page reproductions of some of the magazines front covers and subject matter.

=== "The future is female" ===
Originally featured in COWRIE before being featured in DYKE, an image depicting Alix Dobkin: musician, writer, feminist, and partner to Liza Cowan, wearing a Labrys Books T-shirt with a slogan on the front that says "THE FUTURE IS FEMALE," received international recognition after model Cara Delevingne made an instagram post wearing a shirt with the same slogan. This led to Hillary Clinton repeating the slogan and subsequent coverage of the t-shirt in notable news outlets such as The Washington Post. The slogan has since reverberated in the sphere of LGBTQ+ activism and discourse. In an interview with Liza Cowan in 2019, when asked about the meaning of the slogan, she stated that the slogan was created more so to be thought provoking than to say anything in particular at the time.

=== Archives and digitization ===
In the 2010s Liza digitized the magazine into a blog format, providing free access to issues of DYKE, A Quarterly with additional blog content and links added. Liza also hosts Facebook and Instagram accounts for the magazine which feature parts of the publications there.

Since the end of DYKE's run in 1979, The Museum of Modern Art has archived a collection of DYKE in their library. Additionally, the collection is also available at The Schlesinger Library at Radcliffe College.

== See also ==
- List of feminist periodicals
- List of lesbian periodicals
