= Julia Penelope =

American linguist, author, and philosopher (1941–2013)

- Born: Julia Penelope Stanley; June 19, 1941; Miami, Florida, U.S.
- Died: January 19, 2013 (aged 71); Texas, U.S.
- Occupations: American author, linguist, academic, philosopher; lgbt and feminist activist

Julia Penelope (June 19, 1941 – January 19, 2013) was an American linguist, author, and philosopher. She was part of an international movement of critical thinkers on lesbian and feminist issues. A self-described "white, working-class, fat butch dyke who never passed," she started what she called "rabble rousing" when she was a young woman.

== Early life and education ==
Julia Penelope Stanley was born at Jackson Memorial Hospital in Miami, Florida, to Frederick William Stanley and his wife, Frances.

In 1959, she was asked to leave Florida State University in Tallahassee because of her lesbianism. This was around the time that the Johns Commission was harassing gay faculty and students at the University of Florida in Gainesville, Florida, but she was not interviewed by that commission. She transferred to the University of Miami, a private university, where she was required to live off campus. Eight weeks later, two gay male friends were rehearsing a college production of Lysistrata at her apartment and stayed overnight. A neighbor reported this to the university, and she was expelled for having men in her room. She then earned a BA in English and linguistics from City College of New York in 1966, followed by graduate work at the University of Texas at Austin where she received a doctoral degree in English in 1971.

== Career ==
Her first teaching position was at the University of Georgia in Athens, in 1968. She went on to teach for eleven years at the University of Nebraska–Lincoln, where she was passed over for promotions because her research on lesbians was deemed "too narrow".

=== Activism ===
An activist and an organizer, Penelope attended the first conference of the Gay Academic Union in 1973 at the City College of New York. She was a delegate to the National Women's Conference in Houston in 1977, and she participated in the planning meetings that led to the founding of the Lesbian Herstory Archives. She founded several activist groups, including the "Lincoln Legion of Lesbians" and "Lesbians for Lesbians." She was one of the first scholars to teach women's studies courses, including Twentieth-Century Lesbian Novels and Feminist Literary Criticism.

In 1988, she co-edited with Sarah Lucia Hoagland an anthology on lesbian separatism, For Lesbians Only: A Separatist Anthology. As a lesbian separatist, Penelope was controversial among lesbians. According to her biography in Lesbian Histories and Cultures: An Encyclopedia (2000), she became disheartened by lesbian infighting and withdrew from lesbian writing.

== Death ==
Julia Penelope, aged 71, died on January 19, 2013, in Texas.

== Works ==
- Penelope, Julia; Wolfe, Susan (1980). The Coming Out Stories. Persephone Press. ISBN 9780930436032.
- Penelope, Julia; Hoagland, Sarah Lucia (1980). "Lesbianism, Sexuality and Power: The Patriarchy, Violence and Pornography". Sinister Wisdom. 15. Amherst, Massachusetts. OCLC 70961358.
- Penelope, Julia; Hoagland, Sarah Lucia (1988). For Lesbians Only: A Separatist Anthology. London: Onlywomen Press Ltd. ISBN 9780906500286.
- Penelope, Julia; Wolfe, Susan (1989). The Original Coming Out Stories. Crossing Press. ISBN 9780895943392.
- Penelope, Julia; Grey, Morgan (1989). Found Goddesses: Asphalta to Viscera. illustrated by Allison Bechdel. New Victoria Publishers. ISBN 9780934678186.
- Penelope, Julia; Valentine, Sarah (1990). Finding The Lesbians. Crossing Press. ISBN 9780895944276.
- Penelope, Julia (1990). Speaking Freely: Unlearning the Lies of the Fathers' Tongues. Teachers College Press. ISBN 9780807762448.
- Penelope, Julia (1992). International Feminist Fiction. Crossing Press. ISBN 9780895945679.
- Penelope, Julia (1992). Call Me Lesbian: Lesbian Lives, Lesbian Theory. Crossing Press. ISBN 9780895944962.
- Penelope, Julia; Wolfe, Susan (1993). Sexual Practice/Textual Theory: Lesbian Cultural Criticism. Blackwell Publishers. ISBN 9781557861016.
- Penelope, Julia; Wolfe, Susan (1993). Lesbian Culture: An Anthology. Crossing Press. ISBN 9780895945914.
- Penelope, Julia (1994). Out of the Class Closet: Lesbians Speak. Crossing Press. ISBN 9780895947048.
- Penelope, Julia (1995). Crossword Puzzles for Women. ISBN 9780895947918.
- Penelope, Julia (1998). Flinging Wide the Eyed Universe: Poems by Julia Penelope. ISBN 9781884540349.
