= Fighting Woman News =

American feminist periodical about self defense

- Front Cover of the first issue of Fighting Woman News (December 1975)
- Categories: Martial Arts, Self-Defense, Feminism
- Frequency: Monthly
- Publisher: Valerie Eads
- First issue: 1975
- Country: United States
- Based in: New York, N.Y.
- ISSN: 0146-8812
- OCLC: 3054837

Fighting Woman News was an American feminist periodical founded in December 1975 by Valerie Eads. This newsletter grew out of Eads's regular column in Black Belt Woman. This magazine focused on martial arts, self-defense, and combative sports for and by women. It published news and articles on techniques, workshops, and events. Fighting Woman News also regularly sent representatives to women's conferences to promote self-defense and martial arts literature for women.

Print copies of the magazine sold for $6 for yearly individual subscriptions and $10 for institutions.
