= Country Women =

American feminist magazine

- Front cover of Country Women's last issue (March 1979). Image retrieved from Independent Voices Digital Archive.
- Format: Print
- Publisher: Country Women Publications
- First issue: 1972
- Final issue: March 1979
- Country: United States
- Based in: Albion, California
- Language: English
- ISSN: 0199-1361
- OCLC: 3804478

Country Women was an American feminist magazine published in Albion, California, from 1972 until 1979. Describing itself as "a feminist country survival manual and a creative journal," the magazine published various articles, poems, and illustrations concerning women learning and growing in rural communities. Country Women was founded, hand-illustrated, and typewritten by Carmen Goodyear and a commune of women she had welcomed to her property after moving to Mendocino County.

The magazine advertised itself in HERESIES, another feminist publication, by describing its content:

Half of each issue presents a different theme (Personal Power, Anger and Violence, Sexuality, Women As Mothers/Women As Daughters) and the other half consists of articles on learning specific skills (building a solar energy collector, caring for cows and goats, reglazing windows, and winter gardening).

Country Women was successful for a while, garnering more subscribers than Ms. magazine at one point, but ultimately ceased publication in 1979 due to financial and staff issues.
