= Focus: A Journal for Lesbians =

- Categories: News magazine, lesbian
- Frequency: Monthly
- Publisher: Daughters of Bilitis
- First issue: February 1970
- Final issue: December 1983
- Country: United States
- Based in: Boston
- Language: English

Focus: A Journal for Lesbians was an American lesbian magazine that was published from 1970 to 1983.

== History ==
Focus was established in February 1970, following the success of The Ladder, the United States' first nationally distributed lesbian magazine. It was started by the Boston chapter of the Daughters of Bilitis (DOB), a lesbian rights organization that published The Ladder. The magazine's original subtitle was A Journal for Gay Women, and it replaced Maiden Vogue, a monthly newsletter published by the DOB. By 1974, Focus had built a readership outside of Boston and had gained a reputation for its lesbian-related essays, poetry, and short stories. Initially, virtually all of the magazine's content was written under pseudonyms. Readers could pay 60 cents per issue, $3.50 for a yearly subscription, or $4.50 to buy the magazine in a brown wrapper.

When the Gay Community News was established in 1973, the content of Focus shifted away from coverage of lesbian-related news and events and focused more on arguments for LGBT rights, while its editors became "more vocal" advocates. The magazine gradually increased its promotion of lesbian visibility in the mid-1970s, featuring cover illustrations of women kissing and a nude woman. In 1977 the editors replaced "Gay Women" with "Lesbians" in the magazine's subtitle, reflecting the increasing political and literary emphasis of the content. From 1978 to 1979 Focus was run by five volunteer editors who said they had "no office, no equipment, ... no capital ... and precious little experience". At this time the magazine doubled in length, was released bimonthly, and increased in price.

Focus became an independent publication in 1980 when the Boston chapter of the DOB cut their financial ties with the magazine. Since subscriptions were no longer automatically purchased for DOB members, Focus's readership fell dramatically and the editors began to ask readers for donations. In December 1983, the magazine ceased publication because of increased publishing costs and the decrease in circulation.

== Importance ==
Jan Whitt wrote that Focus allowed its lesbian readership "to unite and to feel more confident about their own self-worth" and described it as "one of the most supportive lesbian publications in the early gay rights movement". In one of its final issues, the editors of Focus described the magazine as "America's oldest literary journal for lesbians—and, therefore, the world's oldest literary journal for lesbians".
