= Off Our Backs =

American radical feminist periodical (1970–2008)

- Language: English
- Edited by: Collective

Publication details
- History: 1970–2008
- Publisher: Off Our Backs, Inc. (United States)
- Frequency: Bimonthly

Standard abbreviations
- ISO 4: Off Our Backs

Indexing
- ISSN: 0030-0071
- LCCN: sv86023034
- JSTOR: 00300071
- OCLC no.: 1038241

Links
- Online archive

Off Our Backs (stylized in all lowercase; oob) was an American radical feminist periodical that ran from 1970 to 2008, making it the longest-running feminist periodical in the United States. Marilyn Salzman-Webb and Marlene Wicks were among Off Our Backs original founders, creating the periodical in Washington, D.C. as a response to what many felt was an underrepresentation of the women’s liberation movement in mainstream media. It was a self-sustaining periodical edited and published by a collective of women consisting mainly of volunteers who practiced consensus decision-making. Reporting on feminism related topics, the periodical transitioned from a monthly to a bi-monthly newspaper, and ultimately to a quarterly magazine before financial difficulties led to its termination in 2008.

Off Our Backs dealt with some controversy in 1984 during the creation of On Our Backs.

Archives of Off Our Backs are housed at Hornbake Library, University of Maryland.

== History ==
Cover art of Off Our Backs' first publication

=== Origins and creation ===
Off Our Backs was founded in January 1970 by Marlene Wicks and Marilyn Salzman Webb in Washington, D.C. The original funding for the periodical came from $400 that was collected to start an anti-Vietnam War coffee house, with the idea for the paper stemming from frustration about the lack of news about the women’s liberation movement in mainstream media.

According to Marlene Wicks, Off Our Backs was originally created because while Marilyn Salzman Webb wrote for the Guardian, every time she submitted articles about women the articles would be edited to the point where they would become nonsensical.

They created the periodical with the intention for the paper to be by, for and about women, emphasizing that the paper was part of a movement. The name Off Our Backs was selected to reflect the dual nature of the women’s movement. Their mission statement was stated as “to provide news and information about women's lives and feminist activism; to educate the public about the status of women around the world; to serve as a forum for feminist ideas and theory; to be an information resource on feminist, women's, and lesbian culture; and to seek social justice and equality for women". The editorial statement from the first issue in February 1970 states that Off Our Backs "is a paper for all women who are fighting for the liberation of their lives and we hope it will grow and expand to meet the needs of women from all backgrounds and classes."

The first issue of Off Our Backs was published on February 27, 1970, consisting of a twelve-page tabloid first issue. The first issue included articles about the birth control pill, abortion rights, Korean women’s movements, and advocacy for women’s rights protests and oppositions. The first issue was written by a collective of 17 women, namely Marlene Wicks, Alison Sand, Roxanne Dunbar, Martha Atkins, Conni Bille Finnerty, Paula Goldsmid, Bonnie McFadden, Charlotte Bunch-Weeks, Sue Tod, Jessica Finney, Marilyn Salzman-Webb, Norma Allen Lesser, Anne Hutchinson, Rachel Scott, Coletta Reid, Regina Sigal, and Alice Wolfson.

=== 1970 to 2002 ===
Off Our Backs began publishing the journal monthly after its initial release, skipping one month of the year. The frequency of publication remained as 11 publications a year from 1970 until 2002. During that time, the Off Our Backs collective wrote about numerous local and international subjects revolving around feminist and women’s issues. During this time, the paper included several exposés, interviews and editorials. By the 1980s the collective published rare editorials and moved away from them to signed commentaries. Carol Anne Douglas (one of Off Our Backs' longest-writing members) explained their cease of editorials due to the fact that the collective "often disagreed on issues anyways".

1977 was the year Off Our Backs peaked, with 15,000 copies sold.

In 1988 Off Our Backs struggled to keep publishing. Carol Anne Douglas stated that only two or three women would attend meetings at the time. It was not until 1989 when three new women joined the collective that Off Our Backs was able to publish with more ease.

By its later years, Off Our Backs switched from a newspaper format to a magazine format.

=== 2002 to 2008 ===
In 2002 Off Our Backs began publishing journals bi-monthly (six times a year). It remained bi-monthly until 2006 when the paper was released quarterly.

Off Our Backs published the last issue of the news journal in 2008, citing financial difficulties as the primary factor behind the cessation. Carol Anne Douglas stated that the lack of money led to the end of publication as prices rose and subscriptions diminished. In their final publication, the Off Our Backs collective wrote about considering moving the periodical online and requesting donations. Off Our Backs never made an online version of the periodical thus was the final issue published.

=== Growth and influence ===
Off Our Backs expanded its coverage to include topics such as: international women's issues, LGBTQ+ rights, and anti-racist activism. The periodical featured investigative journalism and analysis. The collective espoused a commitment to amplifying marginalized voices and engaging in political activism.

For example, Off Our Backs provided coverage of the Roe v. Wade decision and the feminist and LGBTQ movements.

The publication had an impact on the feminist movement in the United States and beyond. The periodical provided a platform for feminist discourse, advocacy, activism, and community building.

== Content ==
Off Our Backs reported on a wide range of feminism related topics not covered in mass media such as issues of international affairs, women's rights, activism, sexuality, women of colour and social justice, positioning itself as a news journal by, for and about women. The form varied throughout its publication, involving a wide range of articles, exposes, interviews, editorials, and signed commentaries.

== Staff ==
=== Collective structure ===
Off Our Backs was written and edited by a collective of women who used consensus decision-making to create the paper. Consensus decision-making allowed the collective to come to decisions acceptable to all. Marilyn Salzman-Webb, one of the paper's founders, described the process behind the collective's writing, stating "each member had to learn about those issues up for discussion: current news, the legal system, the history of the family, the role of romance in Western civilization, etc. (...) As collective members pushed themselves further intellectually, and learned to relate to one another differently from the way (competitively) that they had been taught to relate to other women, they found it necessary to challenge the foundations of their lives, and bringing change on many levels."

The paper always remained nonhierarchical, consisting of around 15 members at a time. Marilyn Salzman-Webb, one of the paper's founders stated that the collective was made up of women ranging from ages 17 to 32.

The Off Our Backs collective was staffed mainly by volunteers. Starting in 1973, Off Our Backs paid one or two staff members minimal salaries.

The periodical was self-sustaining, receiving its funding through paid subscriptions.

== Controversies ==
The title of the magazine On Our Backs (one of the first women-run erotica magazines and one of the first magazines to feature lesbian erotica for a lesbian audience in the United States) was a satirical reference to Off Our Backs, which the founders of On Our Backs considered prudish about sexuality. Off Our Backs regarded the new magazine as "pseudo-feminist" and threatened legal action over the logo OOB.

== See also ==
- List of lesbian periodicals
- Feminism in the United States
