= History of lesbianism in the United States =

Symbol representing lesbian made from two interlocked astronomical symbols for the planet Venus. In biology, the singular symbol represents the female sex.

This article addresses the history of lesbianism in the United States. Unless otherwise noted, the members of same-sex female couples discussed here are not known to be lesbian (rather than, for example, bisexual), but they are mentioned as part of discussing the practice of lesbianism—that is, same-sex female sexual and romantic behavior.

== 1600–1899 ==
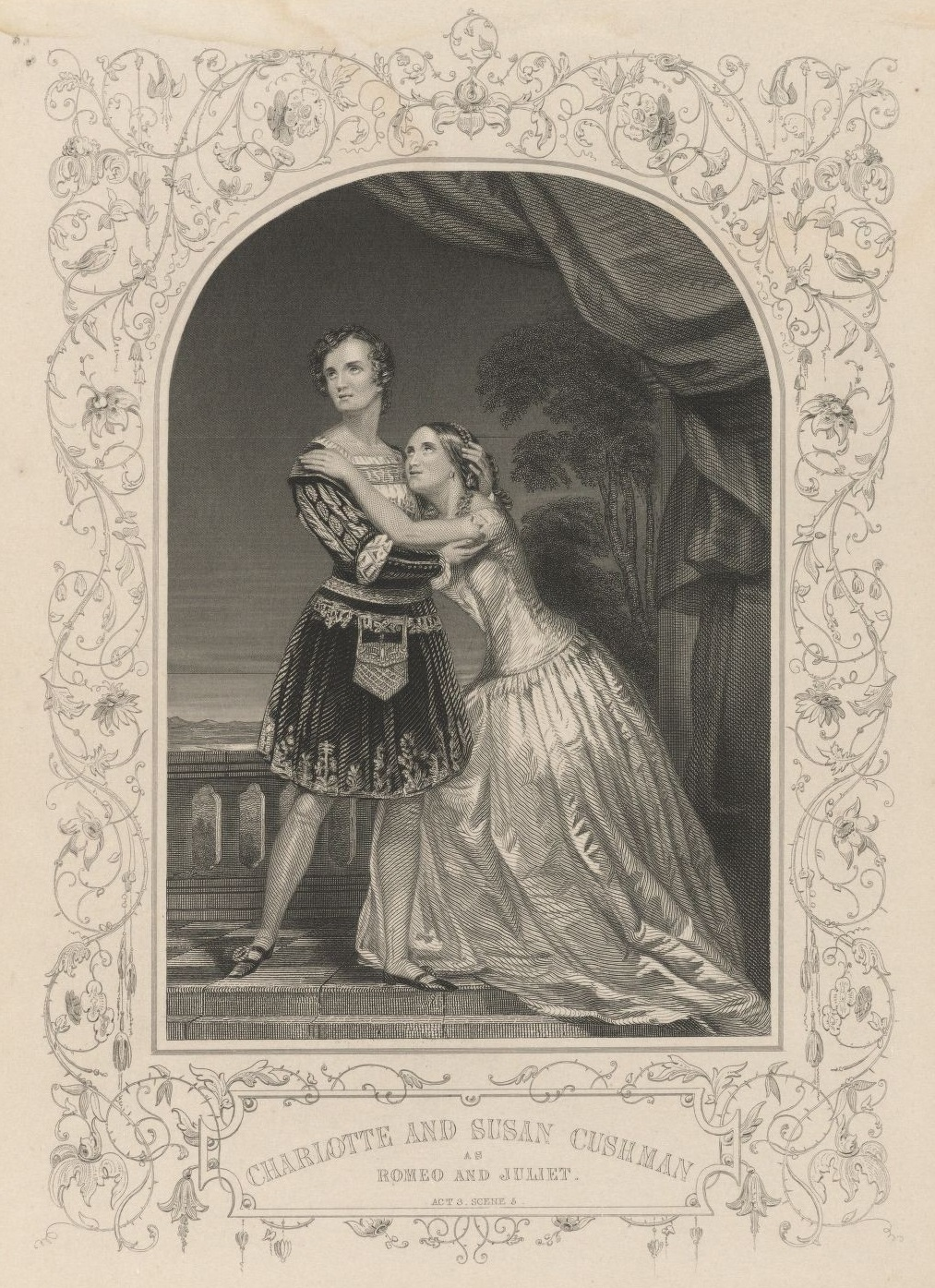
Lesbian actress Charlotte Cushman, (left) as Romeo, with her sister Susan as Juliet in Romeo and Juliet in 1846. Nineteenth century lesbians like Cushman presented themselves publicly as close friends with their romantic partners.

Laws against lesbian sexual activity were suggested but usually not created or enforced in early American history. In 1636, John Cotton proposed a law for Massachusetts Bay making sex between two women (or two men) a capital offense, but the law was not enacted. It would have read, "Unnatural filthiness, to be punished with death, whether sodomy, which is carnal fellowship of man with man, or woman with woman, or buggery, which is carnal fellowship of man or woman with beasts or fowls." In 1655, the Connecticut Colony passed a law against sodomy between women (as well as between men), but nothing came of this either. In 1779, Thomas Jefferson proposed a law stating that, "Whosoever shall be guilty of rape, polygamy, or sodomy with man or woman shall be punished, if a man, by castration. If a woman, by cutting thro' the cartilage of her nose a hole of one half inch diameter at the least", but this also did not become law. However, in 1649 in Plymouth Colony, Sarah White Norman and Mary Vincent Hammon were prosecuted for "lewd behavior with each other upon a bed"; their trial documents are the only known record of sex between female English colonists in North America during the 17th century. Hammon was only admonished, perhaps because she was younger than sixteen, but in 1650 Norman was convicted and required to acknowledge publicly her "unchaste behavior" with Hammon, as well as warned against future offenses. This may be the only conviction for lesbianism in American history.

In the 19th century, lesbians were only accepted if they hid their sexual orientation and were presumed to be merely friends with their partners. For example, the term "Boston marriage" was used to describe a committed relationship between two unmarried women who were usually financially independent and often shared a house. These relationships were presumed to be asexual, and hence the women were respected as "spinsters" by their communities. Notable women said to be in Boston marriages included Sarah Jewett and Annie Adams Fields, as well as Jane Addams and Mary Rozet Smith.

Some American lesbians in the arts moved in the 19th century from the United States to Rome, including the actress Charlotte Cushman, and sculptors Emma Stebbins and Harriet Hosmer. Around 1890, former acting First Lady Rose Cleveland started a lesbian relationship with Evangeline Marrs Simpson, with explicitly erotic correspondence. This cooled when Evangeline married Henry Benjamin Whipple, but after his death in 1901 the two rekindled their relationship and in 1910 moved to Italy together.

== 1900–1949 ==
=== Studies on lesbian activity in prisons ===
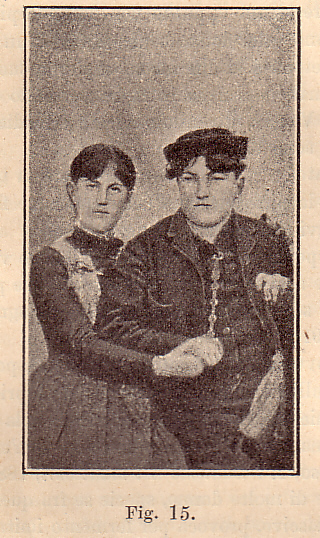
A same-sex female couple on the cover of a 1915 criminology text.

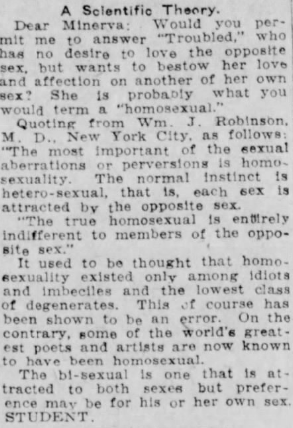
A June 25, 1923 letter written to The Lincoln Star in defense of a lesbian.

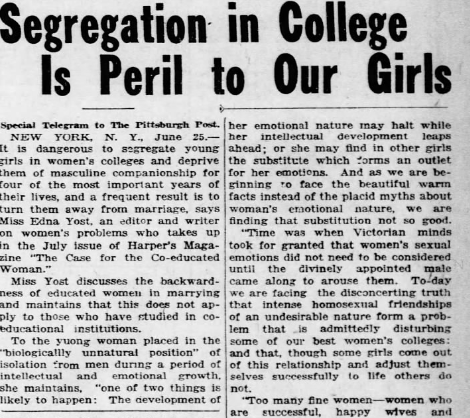
Special Telegram to The Pittsburgh Post, June 26, 1927, expressing alarm over lesbianism in girls' schools.

The earliest published studies of lesbian activity were written in the early 20th century, and many were based on observations of, and data gathered from, incarcerated women. Margaret Otis published "A Perversion Not Commonly Noted" in 1913 in The Journal of Abnormal Psychology, coupling a decidedly Puritanical moral foundation with an almost revolutionary sympathy for lesbian relationships. Her focus revolved more around her revulsion for sexual contact between those of different ethnic backgrounds, yet offered an almost radical tolerance of the lesbian relations themselves. As Otis noted, "Sometimes the love [of one young woman for another] is very real and seems almost ennobling". This document provided a rare view from a tightly controlled setting monitored by a corrections supervisor. Kate Richards O'Hare, imprisoned in 1917 for five years under the Espionage Act of 1917, published a firsthand account of incarcerated women In Prison complete with frightening accounts of lesbian sexual abuse among inmates. So wrote O'Hare: "...A thorough education in sex perversions is part of the educational system of most prisons, and for the most part the underkeepers [sic] and the stool pigeons are very efficient teachers..." O'Hare then recounted a systematic induction of women into a cycle of forced prostitution to which authorities turned a blind eye: "...there seems to be considerable ground for the commonly accepted belief of the prison inmates that much of its graft and profits may percolate upward to the under officials...the...stool pigeon...handled the vices so rampant in the prison...she, in fact, held the power of life and death over us, by being able to secure endless punishments in the blind, she could and did compel indulgence in this vice in order that its profits might be secured".

=== Lesbian community ===
Early academic study of lesbian community include lesbian Mildred Berryman's 1930's groundbreaking The Psychological Phenomena of the Homosexual on 23 lesbian women, whom she met through the Salt Lake City Bohemian Club. In the study most of the subjects (many of whom had Mormon background) reported experiencing erotic interest in others of the same sex since childhood, and exhibited self-identity and community identity as sexual minorities. During the 1920s lesbian subcultures were beginning to become more established in several larger US cities. However, police raids happened on lesbian places, resulting in their closure, such as the Eve's Hangout in Greenwich Village, after the deportation of Eva Kotchever for obscenity.

=== Lesbians in literature ===
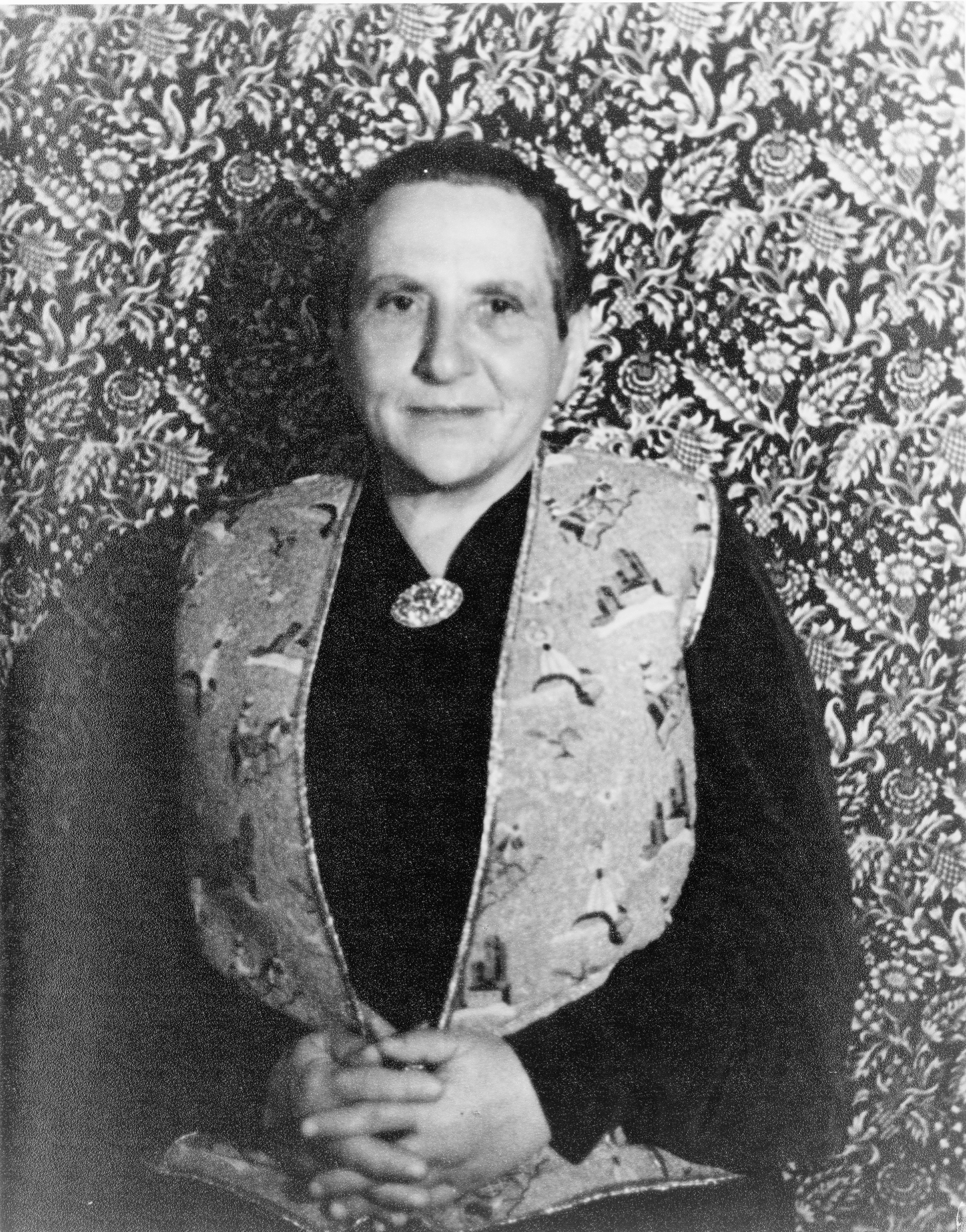
Gertrude Stein

Lesbians also became somewhat more prominent in literature at this time. In the early 20th century, Paris became a haven for many lesbian writers who set up salons there and were able to live their lives in relative openness. The most famous Americans of these were Gertrude Stein and Alice B. Toklas, who lived together there as a couple for many years. In 1922, Gertrude Stein published "Miss Furr and Miss Skeene", a story based on the American couple Maud Hunt Squire and Ethel Mars, artists who visited Stein and Toklas in Paris at Stein's salon. In 1933, Stein published The Autobiography of Alice B. Toklas, a modernist memoir of her Paris years written in the voice of Toklas, which became a literary bestseller. Another significant early 20th century writer about lesbian themes was Djuna Barnes, who wrote the book Nightwood. Both Barnes and Gertrude Stein were visitors to another influential Parisian salon hosted by American expatriate Nathalie Barney, as was sculptor Thelma Wood, photographer Berenice Abbott and painter Romaine Brooks. In 1923, lesbian Elsa Gidlow, born in England, published the first volume of openly lesbian love poetry in the United States, On A Grey Thread.

Yet, openly lesbian literature was still subject to censorship. In 1928, British lesbian author Radclyffe Hall wrote a tragic novel of lesbian love, The Well of Loneliness. After the book was banned in England, Hall lost her first American publisher. In New York, John Saxton Sumner of the New York Society for the Suppression of Vice and several police detectives seized 865 copies of The Well from her second American publisher's offices, and Donald Friede was charged with selling an obscene publication. But Friede and his publishing partner Pascal Covici had already moved the printing plates out of New York in order to continue publishing the book. By the time the case came to trial, it had already been reprinted six times. Despite its price of $5 — twice the cost of an average novel — it would sell over 100,000 copies in its first year.

In the United States, as in the United Kingdom, the Hicklin test of obscenity applied, but New York case law had established that books should be judged by their effects on adults rather than on children and that literary merit was relevant. Morris Ernst, co-founder of the American Civil Liberties Union, obtained statements from authors, including Theodore Dreiser, Ernest Hemingway, F. Scott Fitzgerald, Edna St. Vincent Millay, Sinclair Lewis, Sherwood Anderson, H. L. Mencken, Upton Sinclair, Ellen Glasgow, and John Dos Passos. To make sure these supporters did not go unheard, he incorporated their opinions into his brief. His argument relied on a comparison with Mademoiselle de Maupin by Théophile Gautier, which had been cleared of obscenity in the 1922 case Halsey v. New York. Mademoiselle de Maupin described a lesbian relationship in more explicit terms than The Well did. According to Ernst, The Well had greater social value because it was more serious in tone and made a case against misunderstanding and intolerance. In an opinion issued on February 19, 1929, Magistrate Hyman Bushel declined to take the book's literary qualities into account and said The Well was "calculated to deprave and corrupt minds open to its immoral influences". Under New York law, however, Bushel was not a trier of fact; he could only remand the case to the New York Court of Special Sessions for judgment. On 19 April, that court issued a three-paragraph decision stating that The Well's theme — a "delicate social problem" — did not violate the law unless written in such a way as to make it obscene. After "a careful reading of the entire book", they cleared it of all charges. Covici-Friede then imported a copy of the Pegasus Press edition from France as a further test case and to solidify the book's U.S. copyright. Customs barred the book from entering the country, which might also have prevented it from being shipped from state to state. The United States Customs Court, however, ruled that the book did not contain "one word, phrase, sentence or paragraph which could be truthfully pointed out as offensive to modesty".

Most literature of the 1930s, '40s, and early '50s presented lesbian life as tragedy, ending with either the suicide of the lesbian character or her conversion to heterosexuality. This was required so that the authorities did not declare the literature obscene. For example, The Stone Wall, a lesbian autobiography with an unhappy ending, was published in 1930 under the pseudonym Mary Casal. It was one of the first lesbian autobiographies. Yet as early as 1939, Frances V. Rummell, an educator and a teacher of French at Stephens College, published the first explicitly lesbian autobiography in which two women end up happily together, titled Diana: A Strange Autobiography. This autobiography was published with a note saying, "The publishers wish it expressly understood that this is a true story, the first of its kind ever offered to the general reading public" The first American magazine written for lesbians, Vice Versa: America's Gayest Magazine, was published from 1947–1948. It was written by a lesbian secretary named Edith Eyde, writing under the pen name Lisa Ben, an anagram for lesbian. She produced only nine issues of Vice Versa, typing two originals of each with carbons. She learned that she could not mail them due to possible obscenity charges, and even had difficulty distributing them by hand in lesbian bars such as the If Club.

Furthermore, the Hays Code, which was in operation from 1930 until 1967, prohibited the depiction of homosexuality in all Hollywood films.

=== Lesbians in the military ===
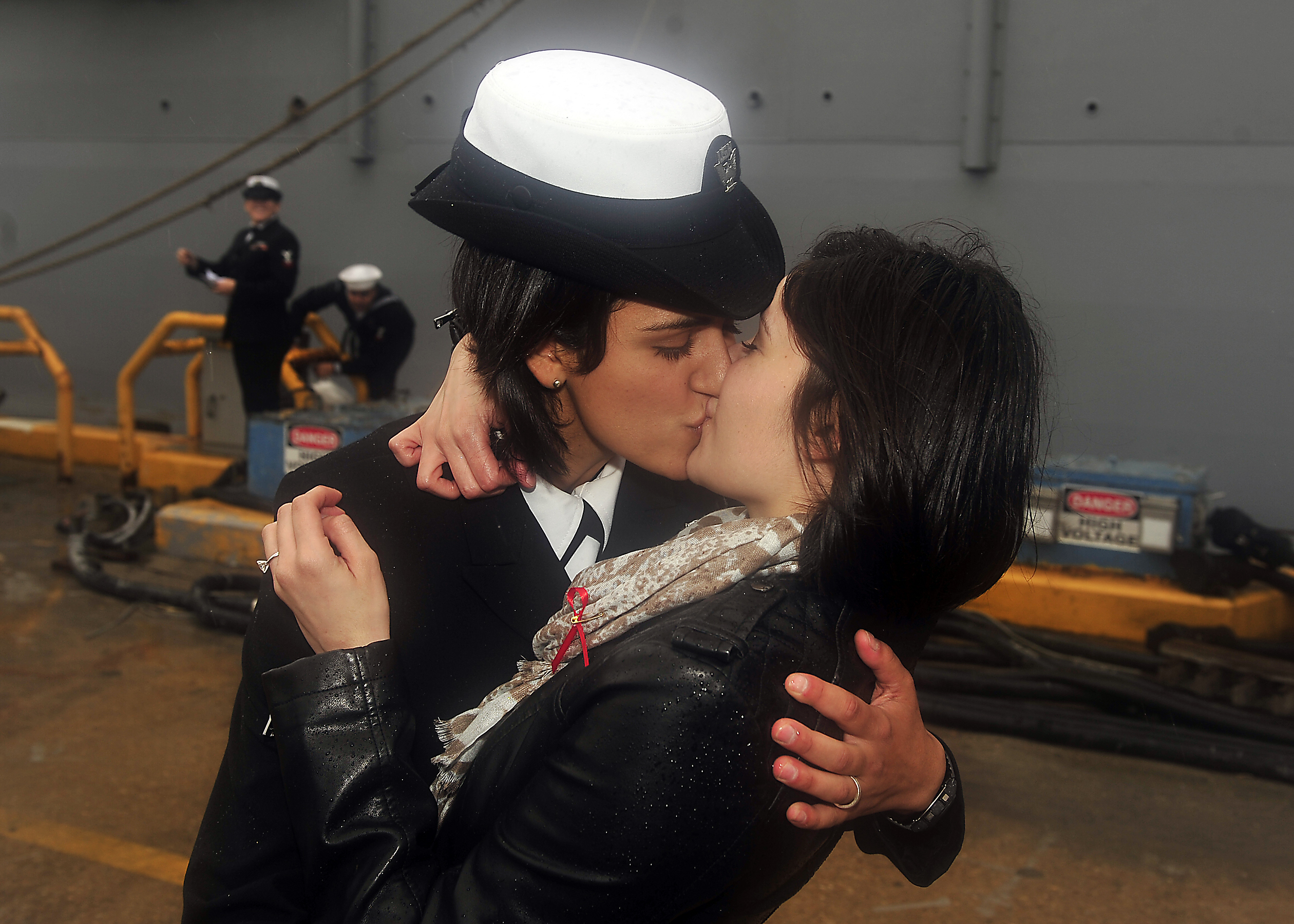
USS Oak Hill FC 2nd Class Marissa Gaeta kisses her fiancé, FC 3rd Class Citlalic Snell, after three-month deployment. Virginia Beach, VA (2011)

Many lesbians found solace in the all-female environment of the United States Women's Army Corps (WAC), but this demanded secrecy, as lesbians were not allowed to serve openly in the U.S. military. Over the years the military not only dismissed women who announced their lesbianism, but sometimes went on "witch hunts" for lesbians in the ranks.

== 1950–1999 ==
=== 1950s: Lesbianism in literature ===
It was not until the mid-1950s that obscenity regulations began to relax and happy endings to lesbian romances became possible. However, publications addressing homosexuality were officially deemed obscene under the Comstock Act until 1958.

Spring Fire, the first lesbian paperback novel, and considered the beginning of the lesbian pulp fiction genre, was published in 1952 and sold 1.5 million copies. It was written by lesbian author Marijane Meaker under the pen name "Vin Packer", and ended unhappily.

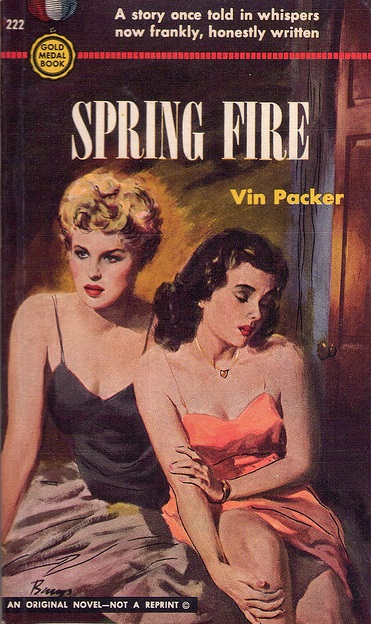
Cover of Spring Fire (1952), the first lesbian paperback novel, by Vin Packer (pen name of Marijane Meaker)

1952 also saw the publication of lesbian classic The Price of Salt by lesbian author Patricia Highsmith, published under the pseudonym "Claire Morgan", in which the women break up but are implied to get back together in the end (the novel was republished as Carol in 1990 under Highsmith's name). In her 2003 memoir, Marijane Meaker said that, for many years, The Price of Salt was "the only lesbian novel, in either hard or soft cover, with a happy ending".

Lesbian pulp fiction novels allowed young lesbian women to have some presence of representation in literature at the time. These works were representative but still limited by homophobic tones in the novels. Pulp novels were a double-edged sword for young lesbian women, as they perpetuated homophobic ideas but allowed for a silent culture to be seen by others in the public as well as read stories about themselves.

=== 1950s: The Kinsey Report ===
In 1953, Alfred Kinsey published "Sexual Behavior in the Human Female," in which he noted that 13% of the women he studied had at least one homosexual experience to orgasm (vs. 37% for men), while including homosexual experience that did not lead to orgasm raised the figure for women to 20%. In addition, Kinsey noted that somewhere between 1% and 2% of the women he studied were exclusively homosexual (vs. 4% of the men).

=== 1950s: Legal restrictions on gays and lesbians ===
On April 27, 1953, President Eisenhower issued Executive Order 10450, which banned gay men and lesbians from working for any agency of the federal government. It was not until 1973 that a federal judge ruled that a person's sexual orientation alone could not be the sole reason for termination from federal employment, and not until 1975 that the United States Civil Service Commission announced that they would consider applications by gays and lesbians on a case by case basis.

=== 1950s – 1970s Rise of the LGBTQ rights movement ===
In the 1950s the lesbian rights movement began in America. The Daughters of Bilitis (DOB) was founded in San Francisco in 1955 by four female couples (including Del Martin and Phyllis Lyon) and was the first national lesbian political and social organization in the United States. The group's name came from "The Songs of Bilitis," a lesbian-themed song cycle by French poet Pierre Louÿs, which described the fictional Bilitis as a resident of the Isle of Lesbos alongside Sappho. DOB's activities included hosting public forums on homosexuality, offering support to isolated, married, and mothering lesbians, and participating in research activities. Del Martin became DOB's first president, and Phyllis Lyon became the editor of the organization's monthly lesbian magazine, The Ladder, which was launched in October 1956 and continued until 1972, having reached print runs of almost 3,800 copies. The show Confidential File on the station KTTV covered the 1962 convention of DOB and aired after Confidential File became syndicated nationally; this was probably the first American national broadcast that specifically covered lesbianism. Kay Lahusen, the first openly gay or lesbian photojournalist of the gay rights movement, photographed lesbians for several of the covers of The Ladder from 1964 to 1966 while her partner, Barbara Gittings, was the editor; previously there had been drawings of people and cats and such on the covers. The first photograph of lesbians on the cover was done in September 1964, showing two women from the back, on a beach looking out to sea. The first lesbian to appear on the cover with her face showing was Lilli Vincenz in January 1966. Daughters of Bilitis ended in 1970.

The Cooper Do-nuts Riot was a May 1959 incident in Los Angeles, in which lesbians, transgender women, drag queens, and gay men rioted, one of the first LGBTQ uprisings in the US. The incident was sparked by police harassment of LGBT people at a 24-hour cafe called "Cooper Do-nuts".

The first public protests for equal rights for gay and lesbian people were staged at governmental offices and historic landmarks in New York City, Philadelphia, and Washington, D.C., between 1965 and 1969. In DC, protesters picketed in front of the White House, Pentagon, and the U.S. Civil Service Commission. Lilli Vincenz was the only self-identified lesbian to participate in the second White House picket. The other two women at that picket were heterosexually married, though one, J.D., identified herself as a bisexual. Lesbian activist Barbara Gittings was also among the picketers of the White House at some protests, and often among the annual picketers outside Independence Hall in Philadelphia. In 1965, Gittings marched in the first gay picket lines at the White House, the U.S. State Department, and at Independence Hall to protest the federal government's policy on discrimination against gay people, holding a sign that read "Sexual preference is irrelevant to federal employment." Gittings and Frank Kameny led the Annual Reminder, the first pickets organized by homophile organizations specifically to demand equality for gays and lesbians, which included activists from New York, Washington, D.C., and Philadelphia and took place each Fourth of July from 1965 to 1969 in front of Independence Hall.

Political lesbianism, which embraces the theory that sexual orientation is a political and feminist choice, and advocates lesbianism as a positive alternative to heterosexuality for women as part of the struggle against sexism, originated in the late 1960s among second wave radical feminists. Ti-Grace Atkinson, a lesbian and radical feminist who helped to found the group The Feminists, is attributed with the phrase that embodies the movement: "Feminism is the theory; lesbianism is the practice." The Feminists, also known as Feminists—A Political Organization to Annihilate Sex Roles, was a radical feminist group active in New York City from 1968 to 1973. They at first advocated that women practice celibacy, and later came to advocate political lesbianism.

The modern LGBT civil rights movement began in 1969 with the Stonewall Riots, when police raided a gay bar called the Stonewall Inn. A scuffle broke out when a woman in handcuffs was escorted from the door of the bar to the waiting police wagon several times. She escaped repeatedly and fought with four of the police, swearing and shouting, for about ten minutes. Described as "a typical New York butch" and "a dyke–stone butch", she had been hit on the head by an officer with a baton for, as one witness claimed, complaining that her handcuffs were too tight. Bystanders recalled that the woman, whose identity remains unknown (Stormé DeLarverie, who was a lesbian, has been identified by some, including herself, as the woman, but accounts vary), sparked the crowd to fight when she looked at bystanders and shouted, "Why don't you guys do something?" After an officer picked her up and heaved her into the back of the wagon, the crowd became a mob and went "berserk": "It was at that moment that the scene became explosive." Lesbian Martha Shelley was also in Greenwich Village the night of the Stonewall Riot with women who were starting a Daughters of Bilitis chapter in Boston. Recognizing the significance of the event and being politically aware she proposed a protest march and as a result DOB and Mattachine sponsored a demonstration. According to an article in the program for the first San Francisco pride march, she was one of the first four members of the Gay Liberation Front, the others being Michael Brown, Jerry Hoose, and Jim Owles.

=== 1970s: Lesbians and feminism ===
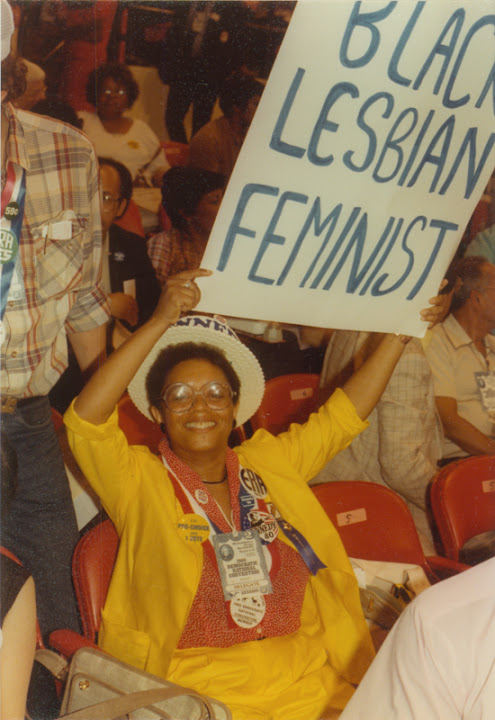
Democratic National Congress (1980)

Lesbians were also active in the feminist movement. The first time lesbian concerns were introduced into the National Organization for Women came in 1969, when Ivy Bottini, an open lesbian who was then president of the New York NOW chapter, held a public forum titled "Is Lesbianism a Feminist Issue?". However, the national president, Betty Friedan, was against lesbian participation in the movement. In 1969 she referred to growing lesbian visibility as a "lavender menace" and fired openly lesbian newsletter editor Rita Mae Brown, and in 1970 she engineered the expulsion of lesbians, including Bottini, from the New York chapter.

At the 1970 Congress to Unite Women, on the first evening when all 400 feminists were assembled in the auditorium, twenty women wearing t-shirts that read "Lavender Menace" came to the front of the room and faced the audience. One of the women then read their group's paper, "The Woman-Identified Woman", which was the first major lesbian feminist statement. The group, who later named themselves Radicalesbians, were among the first to challenge the heterosexism of heterosexual feminists and to describe lesbian experience in positive terms. In 1971 NOW passed a resolution declaring "that a woman's right to her own person includes the right to define and express her own sexuality and to choose her own lifestyle," as well as a conference resolution stating that forcing lesbian mothers to stay in marriages or to live a secret existence in an effort to keep their children was unjust. That year NOW also committed to offering legal and moral support in a test case involving child custody rights of lesbian mothers. In 1973 the NOW Task Force on Sexuality and Lesbianism was established.

At first, Friedan ignored lesbians in NOW and objected to what she saw as demands for equal time. She wrote later, "'Homosexuality ... is not, in my opinion, what the women's movement is all about.'" She refused to wear a purple armband or self-identify as a lesbian as an act of political solidarity, considering it not part of the mainstream issues of abortion and child care. She later wrote, "The women's movement was not about sex, but about equal opportunity in jobs and all the rest of it. Yes, I suppose you have to say that freedom of sexual choice is part of that, but it shouldn't be the main issue ...." Friedan eventually admitted that "the whole idea of homosexuality made me profoundly uneasy." and acknowledged that she had been very square and was uncomfortable about lesbianism.

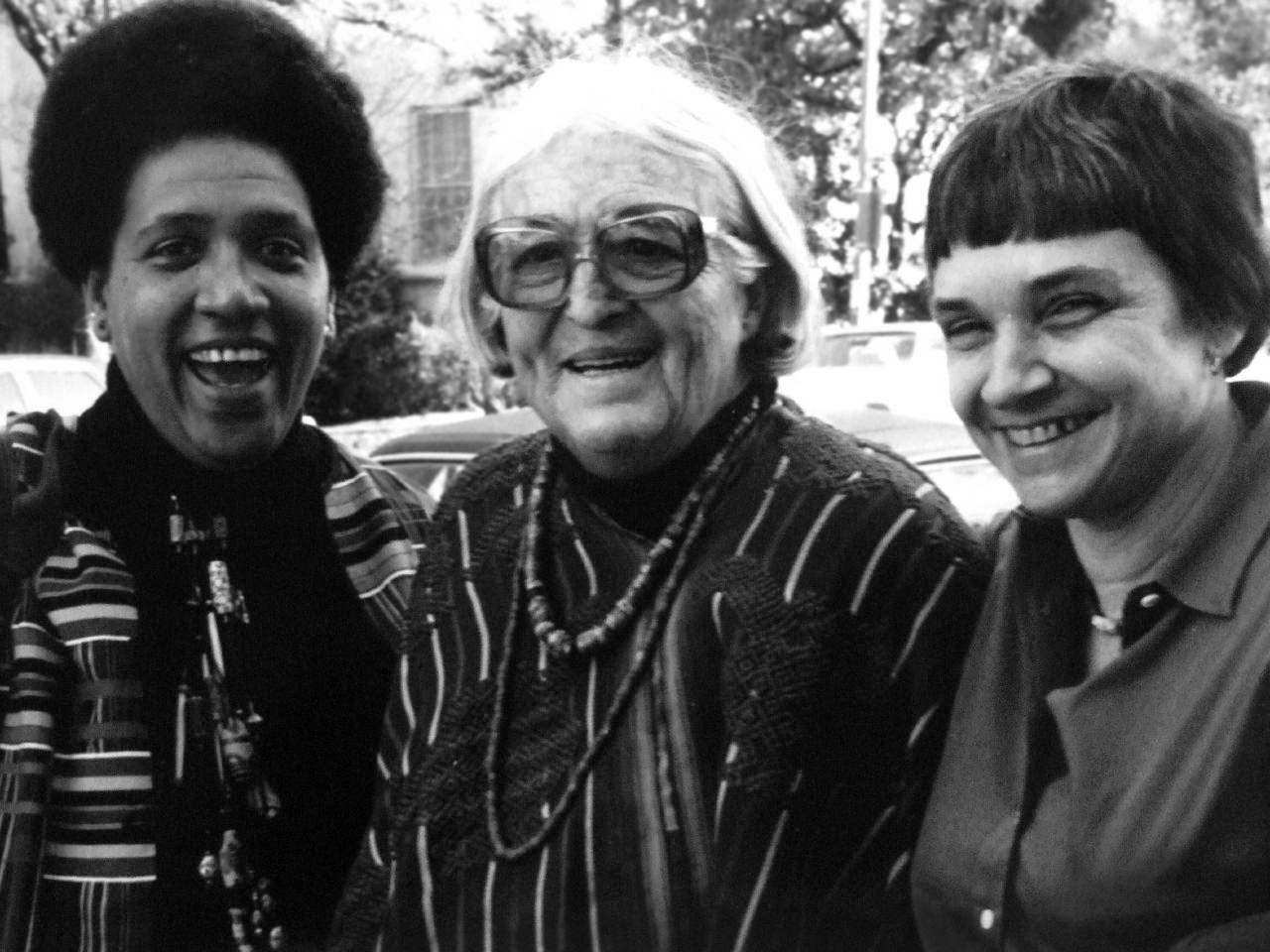
Audre Lorde, Meridel Lesueur, Adrienne Rich (1980)

At the 1977 National Women's Conference, Friedan seconded the lesbian rights resolution "which everyone thought I would oppose" in order to "preempt any debate" and move on to other issues she believed were more important and less divisive in the effort to add the Equal Rights Amendment to the United States Constitution. The lesbian rights resolution passed. In November 1977 the National Women's Conference issued the National Plan of Action, which stated in part, "Congress, State, and local legislatures should enact legislation to eliminate discrimination on the basis of sexual and affectional preference in areas including, but not limited to, employment, housing, public accommodations, credit, public facilities, government funding, and the military. State legislatures should reform their penal codes or repeal State laws that restrict private sexual behavior between consenting adults. State legislatures should enact legislation that would prohibit consideration of sexual or affectional orientation as a factor in any judicial determination of child custody or visitation rights. Rather, child custody cases should be evaluated solely on the merits of which party is the better parent, without regard to that person's sexual and affectional orientation." Del Martin was the first open lesbian elected to NOW's board of directors, and Del Martin and Phyllis Lyon were the first lesbian couple to join NOW.

Lesbian feminism is a cultural movement and critical perspective, most influential in the 1970s and early 1980s (primarily in North America and Western Europe), that encourages women to direct their energies toward other women rather than men, and often advocates lesbianism as the logical result of feminism. Some key American lesbian feminist thinkers and activists are Charlotte Bunch, Rita Mae Brown, Adrienne Rich, Audre Lorde, Marilyn Frye, and Mary Daly.

Lesbian separatism, a subset of lesbian feminism, became popular in the 1970s as some lesbians doubted whether mainstream society or even the LGBT movement had anything to offer them. In 1970, seven women (including Del Martin) confronted the North Conference of Homophile [meaning homosexual] Organizations about the relevance of the gay rights movement to the women within it. The delegates passed a resolution in favor of women's liberation, but Del Martin felt they had not done enough, and wrote "If That's All There Is", an influential 1970 essay in which she decried gay rights organizations as sexist. In the summer of 1971, a lesbian group calling themselves "The Furies" formed a commune open to lesbians only, where they put out a monthly newspaper. "The Furies" consisted of twelve women, aged eighteen to twenty-eight, all feminists, all lesbians, all white, with three children among them. They shared chores and clothes, lived together, held some of their money in common, and slept on mattresses on a common floor. They also started a school to teach women auto and home repair so they would not be dependent on men. The newspaper lasted from January 1972 to June 1973; the commune itself ended in 1972. In 1973, lesbian separatist and cultural critic Jill Johnston published Lesbian Nation, after scandalizing Norman Mailer and others in attendance at a 1971 New York debate on feminism by kissing and rolling around the floor with another woman and announcing, "All women are lesbians, except those who don't know it yet." Another 1970s separatist group, the Lincoln Legion of Lesbians, promoted lesbian solidarity and social events into the 1990s. It was also political, bringing equal rights for gay and lesbian people to a vote in Nebraska.

Lesbian pride flag with double-Venus symbol (in biology and botany, the Venus symbol represents the female sex)

Olivia Records was a collective founded in 1973 to record and market women's music. Olivia Records, named after the heroine of a 1949 pulp novel by Dorothy Bussy who fell in love with her headmistress at French boarding school (the heroine and the novel both being named Olivia), was the brainchild of ten lesbian feminists (the Furies and Radicalesbians) living in Washington, D.C., who wanted to create a feminist organization with an economic base. The Lesbian Herstory Archives, a New York City-based archive, community center, and museum dedicated to preserving lesbian history, located in Park Slope, Brooklyn, was founded in 1974. It was founded by lesbian members of the Gay Academic Union who had organized a group to discuss sexism within that organization, specifically Joan Nestle, Deborah Edel, Sahli Cavallo, Pamela Oline, and Julia Stanley.

Lesbian activist Barbara Gittings remained in the LGBT movement in the 1970s. In that decade, Gittings was most involved in the American Library Association, especially its gay caucus, the first such in a professional organization, in order to promote positive literature about homosexuality in libraries. She was also involved in getting homosexuality accepted by psychiatry, and was a discussion leader for the American Psychiatric Association panel on "Life Styles of Non-Patient Homosexuals," which included Del Martin as one of six panelists. In 1972, she organized the appearance of "Dr. H. Anonymous," a gay psychiatrist who appeared wearing a mask to conceal his identity and joined a panel that she and others participated in titled "Psychiatry: Friend or Foe to Homosexuals? A Dialogue". This spurred the beginning of an official homosexual group within the APA. Also in 1972, and again in 1976 and 1978, Barbara organized and staffed exhibits on homosexuality at yearly APA conferences. Largely due to these efforts, the APA removed homosexuality from its list of mental disorders in 1973. Gay rights activist Frank Kameny called Barbara the "Founding Mother" of the movement.

Lesbian separatist ideology led to the establishment of sex segregated womyn's land communities, and creation of the women-only Michigan Womyn's Music Festival.

=== 1970s Political action ===
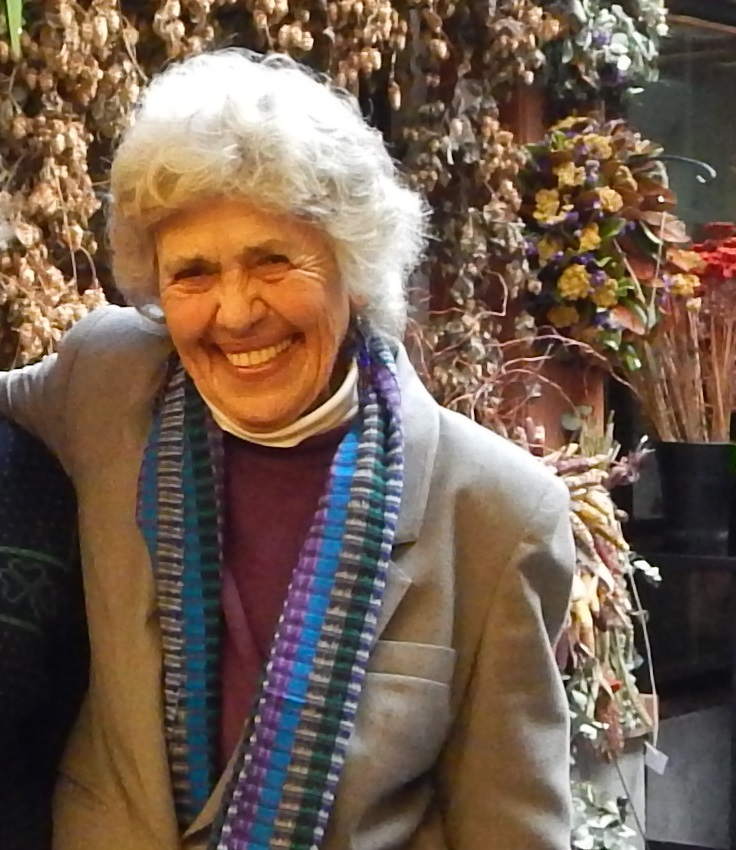
Sally Miller Gearhart worked with Harvey Milk to help defeat the Briggs Initiative in the 1970s

In the 1970s open lesbians also began their first forays into American politics. In 1972, Nancy Wechsler became the first openly gay or lesbian person in political office in America; she was elected to the Ann Arbor City Council in 1972 as a member of the Human Rights Party and came out as a lesbian during her first and only term there. That same year, Madeline Davis became the first openly lesbian delegate elected to a major political convention when she was elected to the Democratic National Convention in Miami, Florida. She addressed the convention in support of the inclusion of a gay rights plank in the Democratic Party platform. In 1974, Elaine Noble became the first openly gay or lesbian candidate ever elected to a state-level office in America when she was elected to the Massachusetts House of Representatives. She had come out as a lesbian during her campaign. Furthermore, the first openly gay or lesbian person to be elected to any political office in America was Kathy Kozachenko, who was elected to the Ann Arbor City Council in April 1974. In 1977, Anne Kronenberg was Harvey Milk's campaign manager during his San Francisco Board of Supervisors campaign, and she later worked as his aide while he held that office. (While Kronenberg identified as a lesbian at that time, she later fell in love with and married a man she met in Washington, D.C., in the 1980s.) In 1978, lesbian Sally Miller Gearhart fought alongside Harvey Milk to defeat Proposition 6 (also known as the "Briggs Initiative" because it was sponsored by John Briggs), which would have banned gays and lesbians from teaching in public schools in California. Gearhart debated Briggs about the initiative, which was defeated. A clip of their debate appeared in the documentary film The Times of Harvey Milk, which also included Gearhart talking about working with Milk against Proposition 6, and appearances by Kronenberg.

In 1979, the first National March on Washington for Lesbian and Gay Rights was held, in Washington, D.C., on October 14. It drew between 75,000 and 125,000 people together to demand equal civil rights and urge the passage of protective civil rights legislation. The march was led by the Salsa Soul Sisters, a lesbian group, who carried the official march banner. Charlotte Bunch and Audre Lorde were the only out lesbians who spoke at the main rally.

San Francisco lesbian bar Peg's Place was the site of an assault in 1979 by off-duty members of the San Francisco vice squad, an event which drew national attention to other incidents of anti-gay violence and police harassment of the LGBT community and helped propel a (unsuccessful) citywide proposition to ban the city's vice squad altogether. Historians have written about the incident when describing the tension that existed between the police and the LGBT community during the late 1970s.

=== 1970s Conflict between some lesbian feminists and transgender women ===
The 1970s also saw conflict between the transgender and lesbian communities in America. A dispute began in 1973, when the West Coast Lesbian Conference split over a scheduled performance by the lesbian transgender folk-singer Beth Elliott, who had helped to create the conference and was on its organization committee as well as having been asked to perform as a singer in the conference's entertainment program. After a vote in her favor, Elliot gave a brief performance and went on to leave the conference. The following day, keynote speaker Robin Morgan gave her address, which she had altered after the events of the previous night. In the speech, titled "Lesbianism and Feminism: Synonyms or Contradictions?" Morgan referred to Elliott as a "gatecrashing...male transvestite" and, using male pronouns, charged her as "an opportunist, an infiltrator, and a destroyer-with the mentality of a rapist." Elliott had served as vice-president of the San Francisco chapter of the Daughters of Bilitis, and edited the chapter's newsletter, Sisters, but was expelled from the DOB in 1973 because she was transgender, as were all transgender women. When Del Martin announced the vote against transgender women in the DOB, the editorial staff of Sisters walked out, leaving the group over the decision. As well, some lesbians protested the fact that lesbian transgender woman Sandy Stone was employed at Olivia Records as Olivia's sound engineer from ca. 1974-1978, recording and mixing all Olivia product during this period. In 1979, lesbian radical feminist activist Janice Raymond released the book The Transsexual Empire: The Making of the She-Male, which was a critique of a patriarchal medical and psychiatric establishment, and which maintained that transsexualism is based on the "patriarchal myths" of "male mothering," and "making of woman according to man's image." Raymond argued that this was done in order "to colonize feminist identification, culture, politics and sexuality," adding: "All transsexuals rape women's bodies by reducing the real female form to an artifact, appropriating this body for themselves .... Transsexuals merely cut off the most obvious means of invading women, so that they seem non-invasive." For example, in The Transsexual Empire: The Making of the She-Male. Raymond asserted that Sandy Stone was working to destroy the Olivia Records collective and womanhood in general with "male energy." In 1976, prior to publication, Raymond sent a draft of the chapter addressing Stone to the Olivia collective "for comment", possibly with the intention of outing Stone. However, Stone had informed the collective of her transgender status before joining. The collective replied that they disagreed with Raymond's description of transgender identity and that they felt differently about Stone's place in and effect on the collective. Raymond responded to this in the published version of her manuscript:

Masculine behavior is notably obtrusive. It is significant that transsexually constructed lesbian feminists have inserted themselves into positions of importance and/or performance in the feminist community. Sandy Stone, the transsexual engineer with Olivia Records, an "all-women" recording company, illustrates this well. Stone is not only crucial to the Olivia enterprise but plays a very dominant role there. The...visibility he achieved in the aftermath of the Olivia controversy...only serves to enhance his previously dominant role and to divide women, as men frequently do, when they make their presence necessary and vital to women. As one woman wrote: "I feel raped when Olivia passes off Sandy...as a real woman. After all his male privilege, is he going to cash in on lesbian feminist culture too?"

Members of the collective responded in turn by defending Stone in various publications. Stone remained a member of the women's collective and continued to record Olivia artists until political dissension over transgender topics, culminating in 1979 with the threat of a boycott of Olivia products. Finally, Stone resigned.

=== 1970s – 1980s Lesbian/feminist sex wars ===
The lesbian sex wars, also known as the feminist sex wars, or simply the sex wars or porn wars, are debates amongst feminists regarding a number of issues broadly relating to sexuality and sexual activity, which polarized into two sides during the late 1970s and early 1980s, and the aftermath of this polarization of feminist views during the sex wars continues to this day. The sides were characterized by anti-porn feminist and sex-positive feminist groups with disagreements regarding sexuality, including the role of trans women in the lesbian community, lesbian sexual practices, erotica, prostitution, sadomasochism and other sexual issues. The feminist movement was deeply divided as a result of these debates. Samois, the earliest known lesbian S/M organization in the United States, was founded in San Francisco in 1978. During the late 1970s and the 1980s, lesbian Andrea Dworkin gained national fame as a spokeswoman for the feminist anti-pornography movement, and for her writing on pornography and sexuality, particularly in Pornography: Men Possessing Women (1981) and Intercourse (1987), which remain her two most widely known books.

=== 1970s – 1980s: Challenge to white feminists by lesbians of color ===
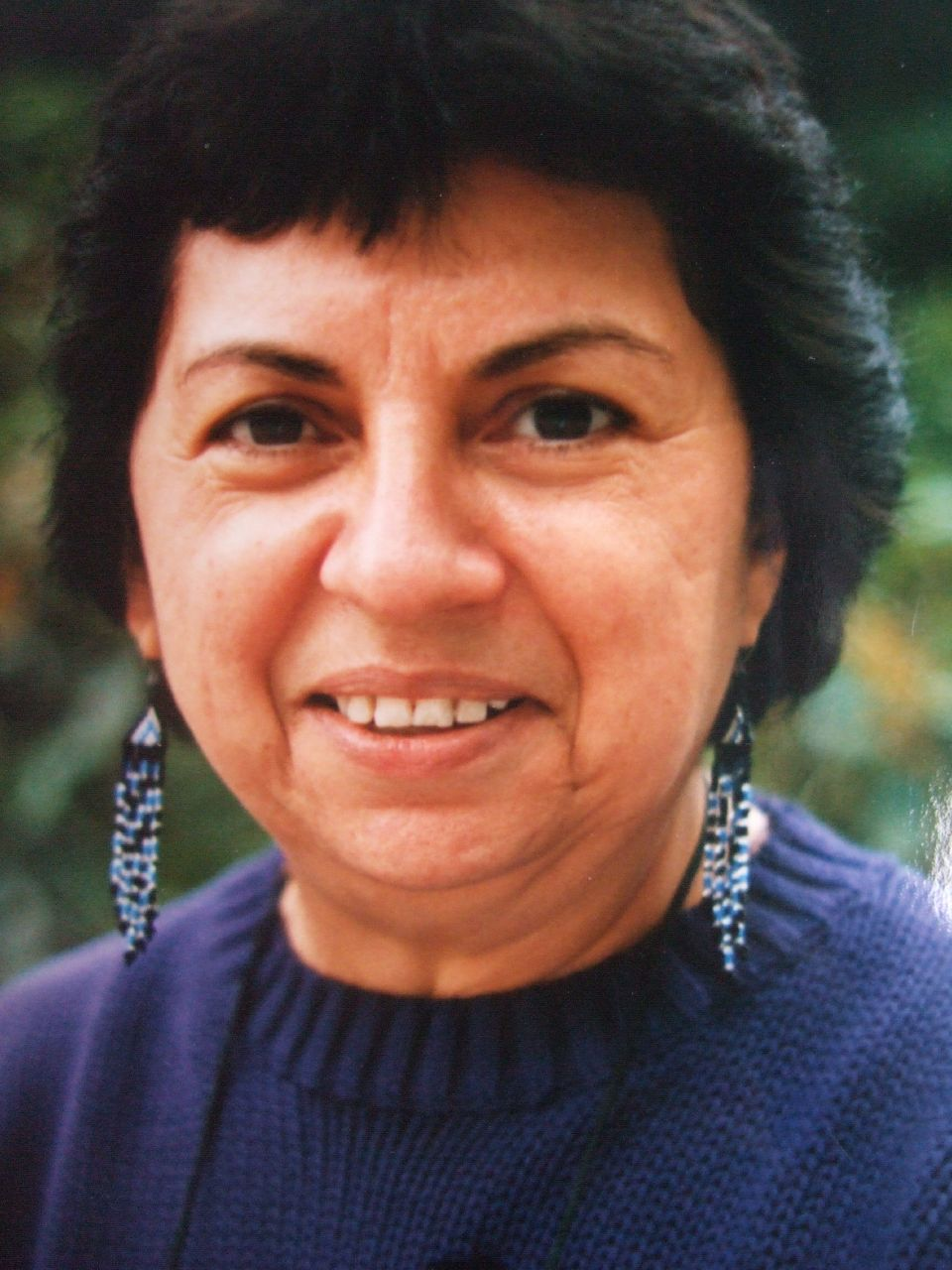
Gloria Anzaldua, writer and editor

In 1977, a Bostonian Black lesbian feminist organization called the Combahee River Collective published their statement which is an important artifact for Black and/or lesbian feminism and the development of identity politics. The Combahee River Collective Statement made legible the concerns of Black women-loving women who felt as though they were being ignored by mainstream feminists and the civil rights movement. Their attention to overlapping oppressions and refusal to accept essentialist, universalizing feminist ideologies has helped to shape third-wave and contemporary feminism.

Another important feminist work published in the 1980s was This Bridge Called My Back: Writings by Radical Women of Color, a feminist anthology edited by American lesbians Cherríe Moraga and Gloria E. Anzaldúa. The anthology was first published in 1981 by Persephone Press, and the second edition was published in 1983 by Kitchen Table: Women of Color Press. The book was out in its third edition, published by Third Woman Press, until 2008, when its contract with Third Woman Press expired and it went out of print. This Bridge centered the experiences of women of color, offering a serious challenge to white feminists who made claims to solidarity based on sisterhood. Writings in the anthology, along with works by other prominent feminists of color, call for a greater prominence within feminism for race-related subjectivities, and ultimately laid the foundation for third wave feminism. This Bridge has become one of the most cited books in feminist theorizing. Another important event for lesbians of color was that "Becoming Visible: The First Black Lesbian Conference" was held at the Women's Building, from October 17 to 19, 1980. It has been credited as the first conference for African-American lesbian women.

=== 1980s: Lesbians and religion ===
Lesbians had some success in being integrated into religious life in the 1980s. In 1984 Reconstructionist Judaism became the first Jewish denomination to allow openly lesbian rabbis and cantors. In 1988 Stacy Offner became the first openly lesbian rabbi hired by a mainstream Jewish congregation, Shir Tikvah Congregation of Minneapolis (a Reform Jewish congregation). Years of debate in the 1980s also led to Reform Judaism deciding to allow openly lesbian rabbis and cantors in 1990.

=== 1990s: Victories and political power ===
In re Guardianship of Kowalski, 478 N.W.2d 790 (Minn. Ct. App. 1991), was a Minnesota Court of Appeals case that established a lesbian's partner as her legal guardian after she (Sharon Kowalski) became incapacitated following an automobile accident. Because the case was contested by Kowalski's parents and family and initially resulted in the partner (Karen Thompson) being excluded for several years from visiting Kowalski, the gay community celebrated the final resolution in favor of the partner as a victory for gay rights.

The Lesbian Avengers began in New York City in 1992 as "a direct action group focused on issues vital to lesbian survival and visibility." Dozens of other chapters quickly emerged worldwide, a few expanding their mission to include questions of gender, race, and class. Newsweek reporter Eloise Salholz, covering the 1993 LGBT March on Washington, believed the Lesbian Avengers were so popular because they were founded at a moment when lesbians were increasingly tired of working on issues, like AIDS and abortion, while their own problems went unsolved. Most importantly, lesbians were frustrated with invisibility in society at large, and invisibility and misogyny in the LGBT community.

From 1993 until 2011, lesbians were allowed to serve in the military, but only if they kept their sexuality secret under what was known as the "Don't Ask Don't Tell" policy.

In the 1990s lesbians also became more visible in politics. In 1990, Dale McCormick became the first open lesbian elected to a state Senate (she was elected to the Maine Senate). In 1991, Sherry Harris was elected to the City Council in Seattle, Washington, making her the first openly lesbian African-American elected official. In 1993, Roberta Achtenberg became the first openly gay or lesbian person to be nominated by the president and confirmed by the U.S. Senate when she was appointed to the position of Assistant Secretary for Fair Housing and Equal Opportunity by President Bill Clinton. Deborah Batts became the first openly gay or lesbian federal judge in 1994; she was appointed to the U.S. District Court in New York. In 1998 Tammy Baldwin became the first openly gay or lesbian non-incumbent ever elected to Congress, and the first open lesbian ever elected to Congress, winning Wisconsin's 2nd congressional district seat over Josephine Musser.

=== 1990s: Lesbianism in the media ===
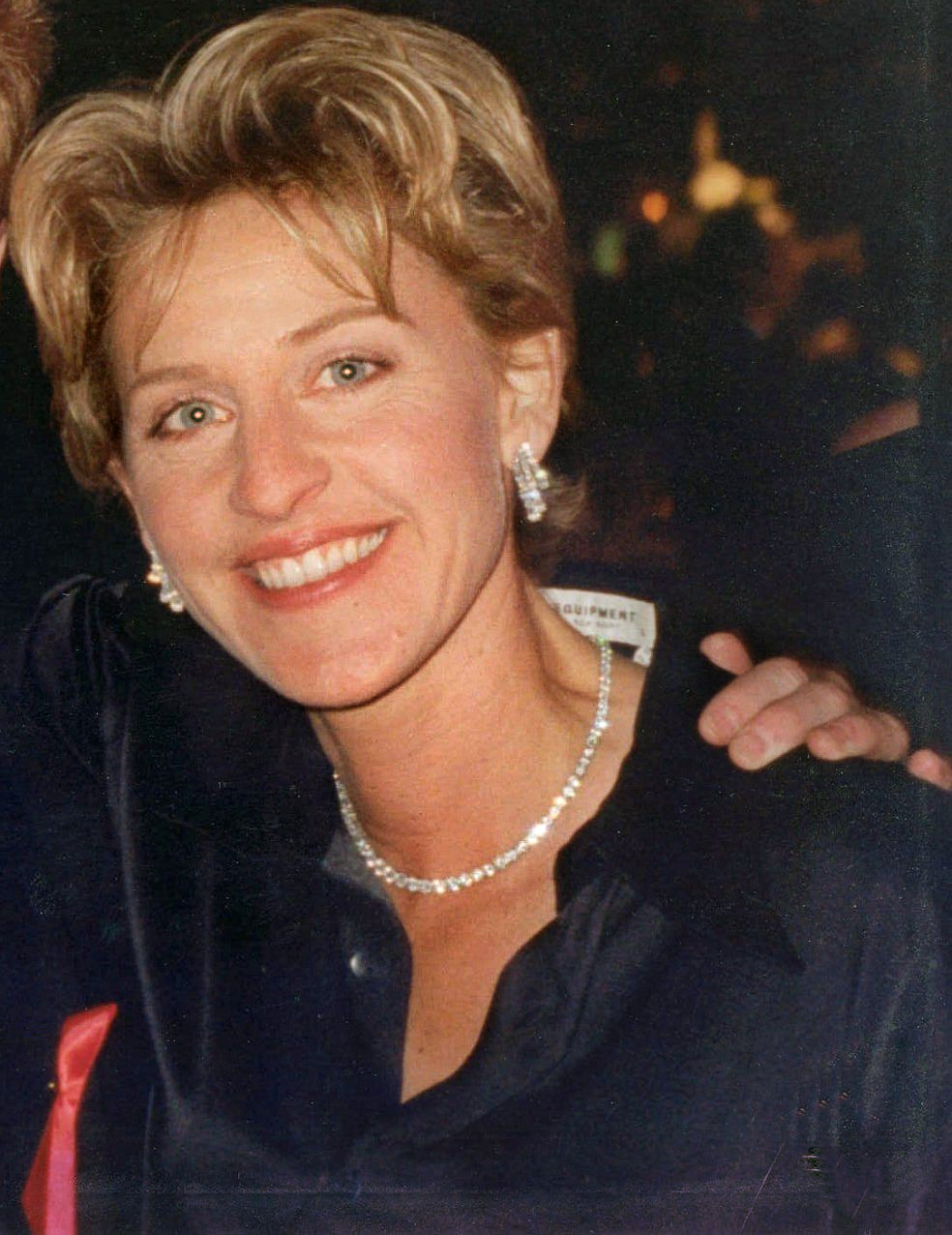
Ellen DeGeneres (1994), one of the first openly lesbian American celebrities

Entertainment also began to show more lesbian stories and openly lesbian performers. In 1991, the first lesbian kiss on television occurred on L.A. Law between the fictional characters of C.J. Lamb (played by Amanda Donohoe) and Abby (Michele Greene). Singer Melissa Etheridge came out as a lesbian in 1993, during the Triangle Ball, the first inaugural ball to ever be held in honor of gays and lesbians. Subsequently her album Your Little Secret went multiplatinum, making her one of the most successful openly lesbian singers ever. She also won a Grammy Award in 1995 for Best Female Rock Vocalist.

In 1996, the first lesbian wedding on television was held for fictional characters Carol (played by Jane Sibbett) and Susan (played by Jessica Hecht) on Friends. In 1997, Ellen DeGeneres came out as a lesbian, one of the first celebrities to do so, and later that year her character Ellen Morgan came out as a lesbian on the TV show Ellen, making her the first openly lesbian actress to play an openly lesbian character on television.

=== 1990s legal victories ===
There were several prominent legal successes for lesbians in the 1990s. Hawaii's denial of marriage licenses to same-sex couples was first challenged in state court in 1991 in Baehr v. Miike (originally Baehr v. Lewin) and the plaintiffs (two same-sex female couples, Ninia Baehr and Genora Dancel, and Antoinette Pregil and Tammy Rodrigues, as well as a same-sex male couple) initially met with some success. But Hawaii voters modified the state constitution in 1998 to allow the legislature to restrict marriage to mixed-sex couples. By the time the Supreme Court of Hawaii considered the final appeal in the case in 1999, it upheld the state's ban on same-sex marriage, but same-sex marriage was legalized in Hawaii in 2013. In 1993 the "Don't Ask Don't Tell" policy was enacted, which mandated that the military could not ask servicemembers about their sexual orientation. However, until the policy was ended in 2011 service members were still expelled from the military if they engaged in sexual conduct with a member of the same sex, stated that they were lesbian, gay, or bisexual, and/or married or attempted to marry someone of the same sex. In 1994, fear of persecution due to sexual orientation became grounds for asylum in the United States. Domestic partnerships were legalized in California in 1999 - the first state to do so, and therefore, the first state to legally recognize same-sex relationships. Lesbian legislator Carole Migden was the primary author and sponsor of the domestic partnership bills. Several other states have legalized domestic partnerships since.

== 2000–2020 ==
=== Civil unions and same sex marriage ===
==== 2000 ====
In 2000, civil unions were legalized in Vermont (the first state to do so) and Carolyn Conrad and Kathleen Peterson became the first couple in the United States to be civilly united. Several other states have legalized civil unions since. Same-sex marriages also began to be legally recognized in the 2000s.

==== 2004 ====
Del Martin and Phyllis Lyon became the first same-sex couple to be legally married in the United States in 2004, when San Francisco mayor Gavin Newsom allowed city hall to grant marriage licenses to same-sex couples. However, all same-sex marriages done in 2004 in California were annulled. After the California Supreme Court decision in 2008 that granted same-sex couples in California the right to marry, Del Martin and Phyllis Lyon remarried, and were again the first same-sex couple in the state to marry. Later in 2008 Proposition 8 illegalized same-sex marriage in California until 2013 (see below), but the marriages that occurred between the California Supreme Court decision legalizing same-sex marriage and the approval of Proposition 8 illegalizing it are still considered valid, including the marriage of Del Martin and Phyllis Lyon. However, Del Martin died in 2008.

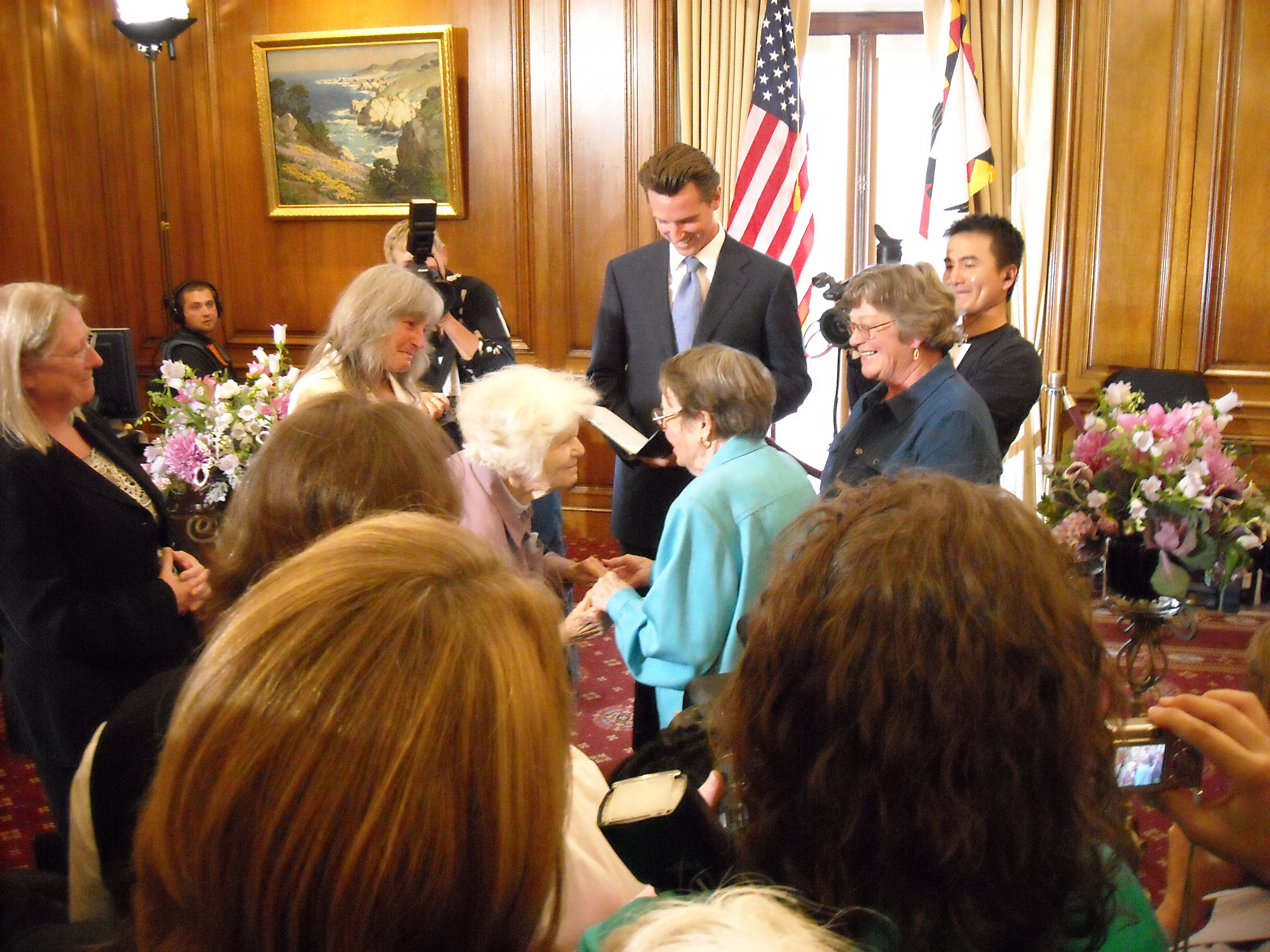
Del Martin and Phyllis Lyon, the first same sex couple to be legally wed in the United States (2004)

In 2004, same-sex marriage was legalized in the state of Massachusetts, and Marcia Hams and Sue Shepherd became the first same-sex couple to receive a marriage license in Massachusetts. Mary Bonauto, herself a lesbian, had argued and won the case that legalized same-sex marriage in the state of Massachusetts in 2003. In March 2004, same-sex marriage was legalized in part of Oregon, as after researching the issue and getting two legal opinions, the commissioners decided Oregon's Constitution would not allow them to discriminate against same-sex couples. The Chairwoman of the Board of Commissioners ordered the clerk to begin issuing marriage licenses. Mary Li of Portland and her partner, 42-year-old Becky Kennedy, became the first same-sex couple to marry in Oregon. However, later that year, Oregon voters passed a constitutional amendment defining marriage as involving one man and one woman. The same-sex marriages from 2004 were ruled void by the Oregon Supreme Court in 2005.

==== 2007 ====
Ciara Durkin becomes the first openly lesbian soldier to die in Afghanistan during Operation Enduring Freedom. Her sexual orientation would become a source of speculation following her death.

==== 2008 ====
Same-sex marriage was legalized in Connecticut in 2008, and state Rep. Beth Bye and her girlfriend Tracey Wilson became the first same-sex couple to marry in Connecticut. That same year, at the request of a same-sex female couple (Kitzen and Jeni Branting), the Coquille Indian Tribe on the southern Oregon coast adopted a law recognizing same-sex marriage. Tribal law specialists said the Coquille may be the first tribe to sanction such marriages. In 2009 Kitzen and Jeni Branting married in the Coquille Indian tribe's Coos Bay plankhouse, a 3-year-old meeting hall built in traditional Coquille style with cedar plank walls. They were the first same-sex couple to have their marriage recognized by the tribe, of which Kitzen was a member.

==== 2009 ====
Same-sex marriage was legalized in Iowa in 2009, and Shelley Wolfe and Melisa Keeton became the first same-sex female couple (and the second same-sex couple) to marry in Iowa. Same-sex marriage was legalized in Vermont in 2009, and Claire Williams and Cori Giroux became one of the first same-sex couples to marry in Vermont (others including them married the moment same-sex marriage was legalized).

==== 2010 ====
The lipstick lesbian flag was introduced in 2010 by Natalie McCray; this is a version with the kiss symbol changed. The lipstick lesbian flag has not been widely adopted; due to some lesbians complaining that it is not inclusive of butch lesbians, while others have argued that McCray wrote biphobic, racist, and transphobic comments on her now-defunct blog.

In 2010, same-sex marriage was legalized in the District of Columbia, and Sinjoyla Townsend and Angelisa Young became the first same-sex couple to marry in the District of Columbia. That year same-sex marriage was also legalized in New Hampshire, and Linda Murphy and Donna Swartwout became one of the first same-sex couples to marry in New Hampshire (others including them married the moment same-sex marriage was legalized).

==== 2011 ====
In 2011, Courtney Mitchell and Sarah Welton, both from Colorado, were married in Nepal's first public same-sex female wedding ceremony, although the marriage was not legally recognized in Nepal. Same-sex marriage was legalized in New York state in 2011, and Kitty Lambert and Cheryle Rudd became the first same-sex couple to be married in New York state. Also in that year, the Suquamish tribe of Washington state adopted a law proposed by a young lesbian tribal member (Heather Purser) recognizing same-sex marriage.

==== 2012 ====
In 2012, a same-sex couple (unknown if they were women or men) wed in December 2012 under Cheyenne and Arapaho Tribal law; the tribe will issue a marriage license to anybody who lives within the tribes' jurisdiction, if at least one person is a tribal member. Also in 2012, Maine, Massachusetts, and Washington became the first states to pass same-sex marriage by popular vote. Later that year Sarah and Emily Cofer became the first same-sex couple to be married in Washington, and Donna Galluzzo and Lisa Gorney became one of the first same-sex couples to be married in Maine.

==== 2013 ====
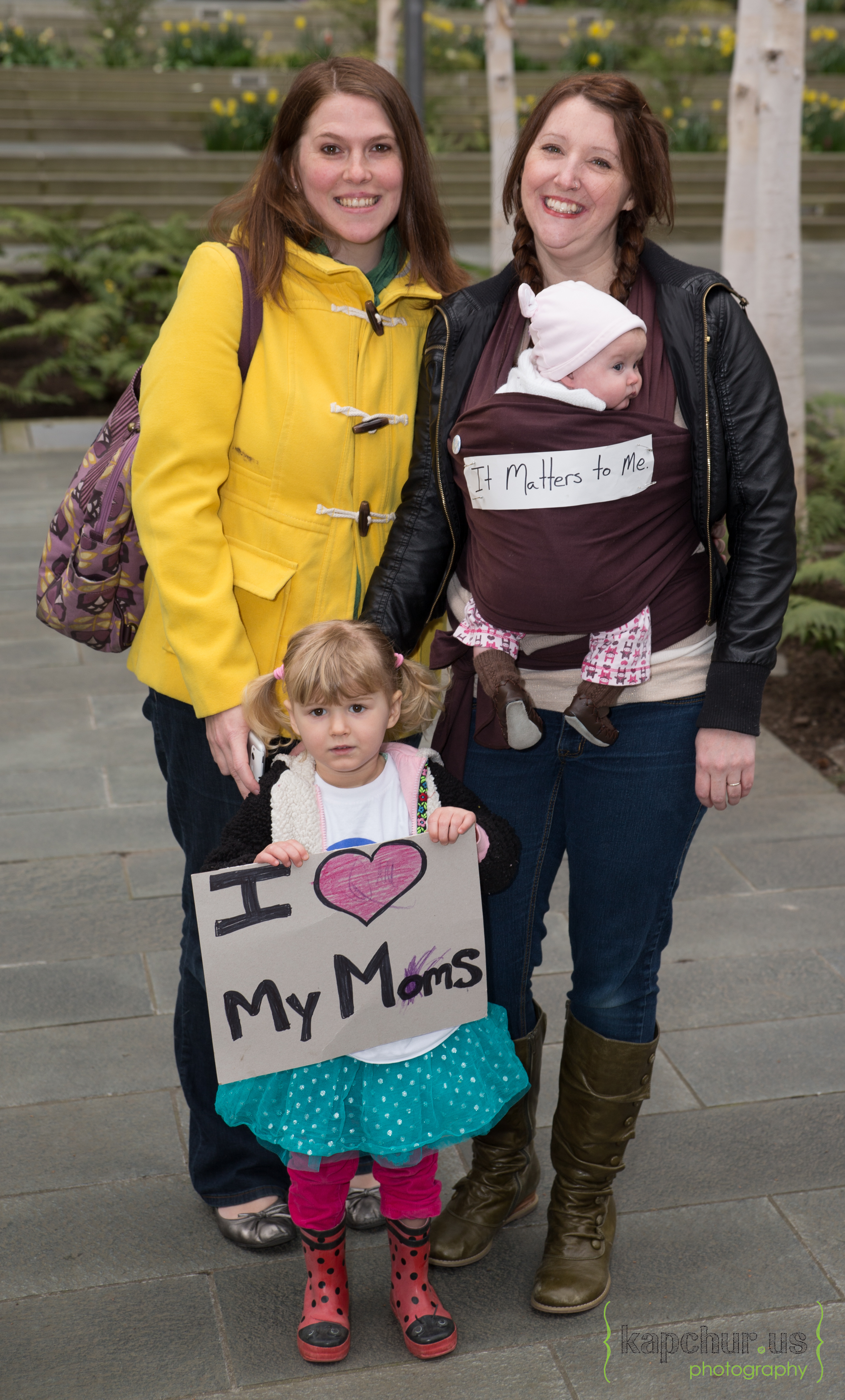
A couple with their children at marriage equality rally, Seattle, WA (2013)

In 2013, in the case Hollingsworth v. Perry, which was brought by a same-sex female couple (Kristin Perry and Sandra Stier) and a same-sex male couple, the Supreme Court said the private sponsors of Proposition 8 did not have legal standing to appeal after the ballot measure was struck down by a federal judge in San Francisco, which made same-sex marriage legal again in California. Kristin Perry and Sandra Stier were married shortly afterward, making them the first same-sex couple to be married in California since Proposition 8 was overturned. Also in 2013, Delaware legalized same-sex marriage and state senator Karen Carter Peterson and her partner Vikki Bandy became the first same-sex couple to be married in Delaware. Also in 2013, same-sex marriage was legalized in Minnesota, New Jersey, New Mexico, Rhode Island, and Utah, and by the Confederated Tribes of the Colville Reservation in the state of Washington, the Leech Lake Band of Ojibwe, the Little Traverse Bay Bands of Odawa Indians, the Pokagon Band of Potawatomi Indians, and the Santa Ysabel Tribe. However, several weeks after same-sex marriage was legalized in Utah a stay stopped it. Also in 2013, Hawaii and Illinois legalized same-sex marriage, and Vernita Gray and Patricia Ewert became the first same-sex couple to marry in Illinois. U.S. District Judge Thomas Durkin had ordered the Cook County clerk to issue an expedited marriage license to Gray and Ewert before the state's same-sex marriage law took effect in June 2014, because Gray was terminally ill; slightly later that same year, it was declared that all same-sex couples in Illinois where one partner had a terminal illness could marry immediately.

==== 2014 ====
In January 2014, same-sex marriage was legalized in Oklahoma, but the ruling was stayed; in 2014, a U.S. appeals court in Denver upheld the lower court ruling that struck down Oklahoma's gay-marriage ban, but that was also stayed. In March 2014, same-sex marriage was legalized in Michigan, and Glenna DeJong and Marsha Caspar became the first same-sex couple married in Michigan; however, later that year the overturning of Michigan's ban on same-sex marriage was indefinitely stayed. In May 2014, same-sex marriage was legalized in Arkansas, and Kristin Seaton and Jennifer Rambo became the first same-sex couple married in Arkansas; later that year, the Arkansas Supreme Court suspended same-sex marriages. In May 2014, same-sex marriage was legalized in Oregon, and Deanna Geiger and Janine Nelson became the first same-sex couple to marry in Oregon. Also in May 2014, same-sex marriage was legalized in Pennsylvania and Wisconsin, but later that year same-sex marriages in Wisconsin were put on hold while the ruling striking down the state's ban on such unions was appealed. That same month, Idaho's same-sex marriage ban was declared unconstitutional, but another court stayed the ruling. Also in 2014, same-sex marriage was legalized in Kentucky, but that ruling was put on hold and so no same-sex marriages were performed at that time. Indiana performed same-sex marriages for three days in 2014, but then the ruling legalizing same-sex marriage in Indiana was likewise put on hold. Similarly, a federal appeals court based in Denver found that states cannot ban gay marriage, but that ruling was put on hold pending an appeal; however, Boulder county clerk Hillary Hall (the first clerk to do so) and clerks in Denver and Pueblo counties issued marriage licenses to same-sex couples in Colorado in spite of the hold. Later that year, same-sex marriage was legalized in Colorado, but the ruling was stayed. Colorado's Supreme Court ordered the Denver county clerk to stop issuing marriage licenses to gay couples while the state's ban against the unions was in place. While that decision did not include Boulder and Pueblo, Pueblo county agreed to stop issuing licenses at the request of the Attorney General's office, but Boulder's clerk did not. Later that year a federal judge in Denver ruled Colorado's ban on same-sex marriage was unconstitutional, but the ruling was stayed. Later that year the Colorado Supreme Court ordered Boulder County clerk Hillary Hall to stop issuing same-sex marriage licenses.

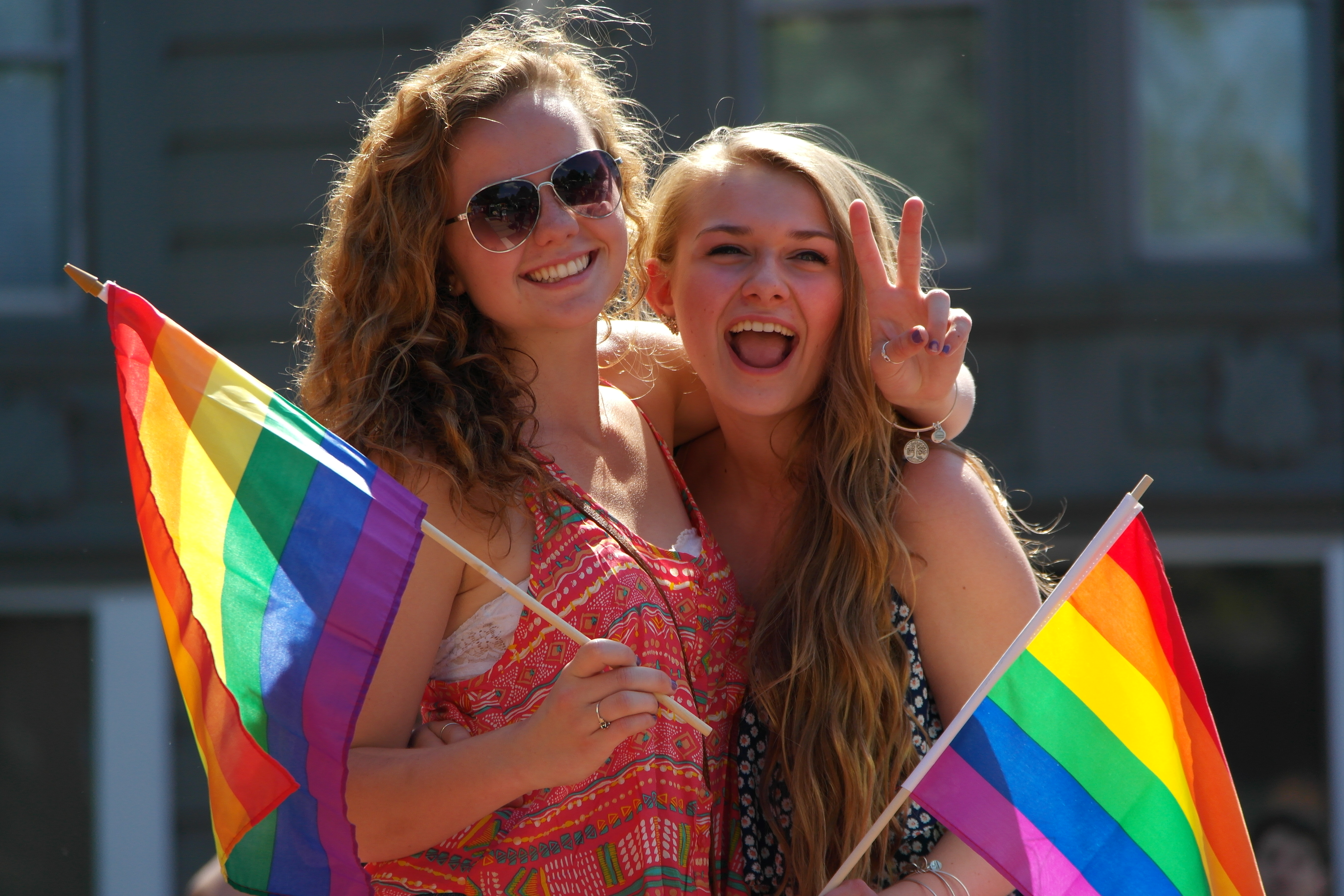
Two women at the Capital Pride Parade, Washington, DC (2014)

Also in 2014, Monroe County, Florida, legalized same-sex marriages, but the ruling was stayed. Later that year Miami-Dade Circuit Judge Sarah Zabel legalized same-sex marriage in Florida, but the ruling was stayed. Shortly afterward, two more judges legalized same-sex marriage in Florida, but their rulings were stayed. Toward the end of July 2014, the Fourth Circuit Court of Appeals (covering Maryland, Virginia, and the Carolinas) ruled against Virginia's gay marriage ban, but the ruling was stayed. However, in August 2014 a state court in Kingston, Tennessee, became the first to uphold a state ban on gay marriage since the Supreme Court's decision in 2013 in United States v. Windsor. Also, in September 2014 a federal judge upheld Louisiana's ban on same-sex marriages, which was the first such loss for LGBTQ rights in federal court since the Supreme Court's decision in 2013 in United States v. Windsor. But slightly later the 7th Circuit Court of Appeals legalized same-sex marriage in Indiana and Wisconsin, although the decision did not take effect then. Also, Louisiana legalized same-sex marriage in September 2014, but the ruling did not take effect then. In October 2014, the Supreme Court declined to hear the seven cases regarding same-sex marriage in Indiana, Oklahoma, Utah, Virginia, and Wisconsin, which meant lower court decisions ruling in favor of same-sex marriage stood, and therefore same-sex marriage then became legal in those states.

Shortly later that month, the 9th Circuit Court of Appeals in San Francisco declared same-sex marriage legal in Idaho and Nevada, but Supreme Court Justice Anthony Kennedy temporarily blocked that ruling for Idaho. Shortly later a private group that had led the legal fight to defend the voter-approved ban on same-sex marriage withdrew its pending appeal for a stay with the Supreme Court, and thus same-sex marriage became legal in Nevada. Nevada state Sen. Kelvin Atkinson and Sherwood Howard were the first same-sex couple to marry in Nevada. Also in October 2014, a federal judge legalized same-sex marriage in North Carolina; although his federal judicial district only covers the western third of the state, North Carolina Attorney General Roy Cooper said that the federal ruling applied statewide. Also that month Attorney General Patrick Morrisey announced he would no longer fight a challenge to West Virginia's same-sex marriage ban, and thus same-sex marriage was legalized in West Virginia. Same-sex marriage was also legalized in Alaska, Arizona, Colorado, Idaho, and Wyoming that month. In November 2014, same-sex marriage was legalized in Kansas, but Supreme Court Justice Sonia Sotomayor issued an order temporarily blocking it. The order was lifted later that month; although Kansas Attorney General Derek Schmidt said that a separate lawsuit he filed with the state Supreme Court should prevent gay marriage in all but the two counties that were home to cases covered in the ruling from the nation's capital (Douglas and Sedgwick counties) couples beyond Douglas and Sedgwick counties picked up marriage licenses also. Later in November 2014 the Kansas Supreme Court ruled that Johnson County could issue marriage licenses to same-sex couples and left it to the federal courts to determine whether a Kansas ban on same-sex marriage violated the U.S. Constitution. Derek Schmidt then asked the 10th Circuit Court of Appeals for an en banc hearing on the Kansas same-sex marriage ban, but the 10th Circuit refused. Also in November 2014, same-sex marriage was legalized in Montana and South Carolina, although the ruling in South Carolina was stayed until later that month. Kayla Bennett and Kristin Anderson were the first same-sex couple to be married in South Carolina. That same month, same-sex marriage was legalized in Arkansas and Mississippi, but the rulings were stayed. Also in November 2014, St. Louis Circuit Judge Rex Burlison ruled that Missourians in same sex relationships have the right to marry, and St. Louis County began complying with that ruling, as shortly after Jackson County also did. But the judge who issued the ruling striking down Missouri's same-sex marriage ban stayed its order directing Jackson County to issue licenses to same-sex couples. Also in November 2014, the Sixth Circuit Court of Appeals upheld bans on same-sex marriage in Kentucky, Ohio, Tennessee, and Michigan, marking the first time since the Supreme Court's rulings in Windsor v. U.S. and Hollingsworth v. Perry (both of which were in favor of same-sex marriage) that any federal appeals court upheld a state's voter-approved ban on same-sex marriage.

==== 2015 ====
Pink lesbian flag with colors copied from the lipstick lesbian flag.

In January 2015, U.S. District Judge Robert Hinkle in Tallahassee ruled that all clerks in the state were required under the Constitution to issue marriage licenses to all same-sex couples. On January 5, 2015, same-sex marriage was legalized in Miami-Dade County when Judge Sarah Zabel lifted the legal stay on her July decision legalizing same-sex marriage in Florida, and Karla Arguello and Catherina Pareto became the first same-sex couple married in Florida. On January 6, 2015 same-sex marriage was legalized and began throughout Florida. Also in January 2015, same-sex marriage was legalized in South Dakota, but the ruling was stayed. Also that month, same-sex marriage was legalized in two separate rulings in Alabama, but both rulings were stayed. However, in February 2015 same-sex marriage was legalized in Alabama after the Supreme Court refused Alabama's attorney general's request to keep same-sex marriages on hold until the Supreme Court ruled whether laws banning them are constitutional. But the chief justice of the Alabama Supreme Court, Roy Moore, wrote in his own order later that the latest ruling legalizing same-sex marriage in Alabama did not apply to the state's probate judges and directed them not to comply. The judge who issued that latest ruling (Judge Callie V. S. Granade) then ruled that the local probate judge (Judge Don Davis of Mobile County) could not refuse to issue marriage licenses to same-sex couples, after which Davis began issuing licenses to same-sex couples, as did many counties in Alabama. On February 17, 2015, a Texas probate judge ruled that the state's ban on same-sex marriage was unconstitutional, as part of an estate battle. Later that month Sarah Goodfriend and Suzanne Bryant became the first same-sex couple married in Texas, after their marriage license was issued in response to a district judge's order in Travis County because one of the women had been diagnosed with ovarian cancer. However, the clerk's office noted that "[a]ny additional licenses issued to same sex couples also must be court ordered," and the Texas Supreme Court issued an emergency stay that same afternoon they were married. Also in February 2015, the Central Council of Tlingit and Haida Indian Tribes of Alaska announced its courts were authorized to allow the performance of same-sex marriages. In March 2015, same-sex marriage was legalized in Nebraska, but that was stayed until March 9 to give state officials time to appeal the ruling and ask for an extension of the stay, and then the Eighth Circuit granted the state's request, which placed same-sex marriage in Nebraska on hold until the federal appeals court ruled on Nebraska's marriage ban. Also in March 2015, the Alabama supreme court ordered Alabama's probate judges to stop issuing marriage licenses to same-sex couples, stating that a previous federal ruling that same-sex marriage bans violate the US constitution did not preclude them from following state law, which defined marriage as between a man and a woman.

In May 2015, a federal judge ruled that same-sex marriage was legal in all Alabama counties, but placed her decision on hold until the Supreme Court issued a ruling on same-sex marriage. On June 5, 2015, a judge issued a ruling which struck down Guam's statutory ban on same-sex marriage. The ruling was issued immediately after the court hearing proceedings and went into effect on 8 am Tuesday June 9. Same-sex marriages became performable and recognised in the U.S. territory from that date. Attorneys representing the government of Guam had said in a May 18 court filing that "should a court strike current Guam law, they would respect and follow such a decision". On June 9, 2015, Loretta M. Pangelinan, 28, and Kathleen M. Aguero, 29, were the first of several same-sex couples to receive a marriage license in the territory's capital, Hagåtña. The first couple to marry was Deasia Johnson of Killeen, Texas and Nikki Dismuke of New Orleans, who married each other in a brief ceremony in the office of Public Health Director James Gillan on the morning on June 9, 2015, the day the island territory became the United States' first overseas territory to recognize same-sex marriage.

Finally, on June 26, 2015, the Supreme Court ruled by a 5-to-4 vote in Obergefell v. Hodges that the Constitution guarantees a right to same-sex marriage, legalizing it throughout the United States. Mary Bonauto, herself a lesbian, was the attorney for the plaintiffs arguing in favor of same-sex marriage. Organizations have estimated that there are approximately twenty million lesbian and gay Americans.

=== Other legal victories ===
Orange-pink lesbian flag derived from the pink lesbian flag, circulated on social media in 2018.

Five-stripes variant of orange-pink lesbian flag.

Aside from the legalization of same-sex marriage, there were seven significant legal victories for lesbians from the year 2000 until 2020. In 2009, due to the Matthew Shepard and James Byrd, Jr. Hate Crimes Prevention Act being signed into law, the definition of federal hate crime was expanded to include those violent crimes in which the victim is selected due to their sexual orientation; previously federal hate crimes were defined as only those violent crimes where the victim is selected due to their race, color, religion, or national origin. In 2011, the "Don't Ask Don't Tell" policy was ended, allowing lesbians, gay men, and bisexuals in the U.S. military to be open about their sexuality. The FAIR Education Act (Senate Bill 48) became law in California in 2011; this law requires the inclusion of the political, economic, and social contributions of lesbian, gay, bisexual, and transgender people and people with disabilities in California's educational textbooks and the social studies curricula in California public schools. In 2013, in the case United States v. Windsor, brought by lesbian Edie Windsor and argued by lesbian attorney Roberta Kaplan, the Supreme Court struck down Section 3 of the federal Defense of Marriage Act (DOMA), which had denied federal benefits to same-sex couples who were legally married in their states. Also, in 2014, President Obama signed Executive Order 13672 adding both "sexual orientation" and "gender identity" to the categories protected against discrimination in employment and hiring on the part of federal government contractors and sub-contractors. In 2015, an important victory came when the U.S. Equal Employment Opportunity Commission concluded that Title VII of the Civil Rights Act of 1964 does not allow sexual orientation discrimination in employment because it is a form of sex discrimination. In 2017, the Supreme Court ruled in Pavan v. Smith that in regard to the issuing of birth certificates, no state can treat same-sex couples differently than heterosexual ones; the case was brought by two same-sex female couples.

Bostock v. Clayton County, 590 U.S. ___ (2020), was a landmark Supreme Court case in which the Court held that Title VII of the Civil Rights Act of 1964 protects employees against discrimination because of their sexual orientation or gender identity.

=== Setbacks regarding law ===
In 2017, the Department of Justice filed an amicus brief in the 2nd U.S. Circuit Court of Appeals making the argument that Title VII of the Civil Rights Act of 1964 does not prohibit discrimination against employees who are gay or bisexual.

=== Lesbians in politics and business ===
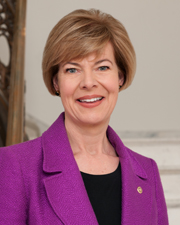
Tammy Baldwin, official 113th Congress photo portrait

In 2012, Tammy Baldwin became the first openly lesbian or gay senator in American history. Another first for lesbians in politics came that year when the first lesbian Super PAC, LPAC, was founded by lesbian Urvashi Vaid to represent the interests of lesbians in the United States, and to campaign on LGBT and women's rights issues.

In 2015 Aisha Moodie-Mills became the new president and CEO of the Victory Fund, which made her the first woman, first black woman, first lesbian, and first black lesbian to become the head of a national leading LGBTQ organization.

=== Lesbian representation in media ===
The turn of the century saw a gradual rise in mainstream lesbian representation. In Season 4 of Buffy the Vampire Slayer (1997–2003), the relationship between Willow Rosenberg and Tara Maclay's became one of the first prominent portrayals of a lesbian couple on American primetime television. The series also featured the first lesbian sex scene in broadcast TV history.

Showtime's The L Word (2004-2009) was the first series to feature a significant number of lesbian characters as its leads and to show diverse portrayals of lesbian identity. It is considered groundbreaking for its positive and multi-faceted portrayal of queer community. Netflix's Orange is the New Black (2013-2019) similarly portrayed several lesbian characters and relationships and confronted various lesbian stereotypes throughout its plot lines.

In 2016, The CW's series The 100 sparked outrage amongst fans after it killed off one of its lead characters Lexa, a powerful leader and established lesbian, soon after confirming her relationship with protagonist Clarke Griffin. For many, Lexa's death was indicative of a wider pattern of lesbian characters dying contributing to the "Bury Your Gays" trope. GLAAD's annual report on LGBT representation called 2016 "a very deadly year for queer female characters."

A number of animated shows, many geared towards a younger audience, have been praised for their portrayals of lesbian relationships. In 2014, The Legend of Korra ended with a final shot that confirms a romantic relationship between Asami and Korra, pushing boundaries for representation in children's television. She-Ra and the Princesses of Power (2018) similarly ends with Catra and Adora confessing their mutual love and sharing an on-screen kiss.

DC Comics confirmed in 2020 that the modern Batwoman is an out lesbian.

GLAAD reports that lesbian characters made up 40% of LGBT characters on broadcast television from 2021 to 2022.

=== Orlando shootings ===
On June 11, 2016, Pulse, a gay nightclub in Orlando, Florida, was hosting Latin Night, a weekly Saturday-night event drawing a primarily Hispanic crowd. In what was the deadliest mass shooting and the worst terror attack since 9/11 to occur in the United States, a mass shooting then occurred which killed 50 people, including the shooter, and injured 53. ISIL's Amaq News Agency claimed that the assault, "... was carried out by an Islamic State fighter". The FBI identified the deceased gunman as Omar Mir Seddique Mateen, a 29-year-old American citizen born in New York to Afghani parents, and living in Port St. Lucie, Florida. Mateen called 9-1-1 during the attack and pledged allegiance to ISIL.

== Notable American lesbians ==
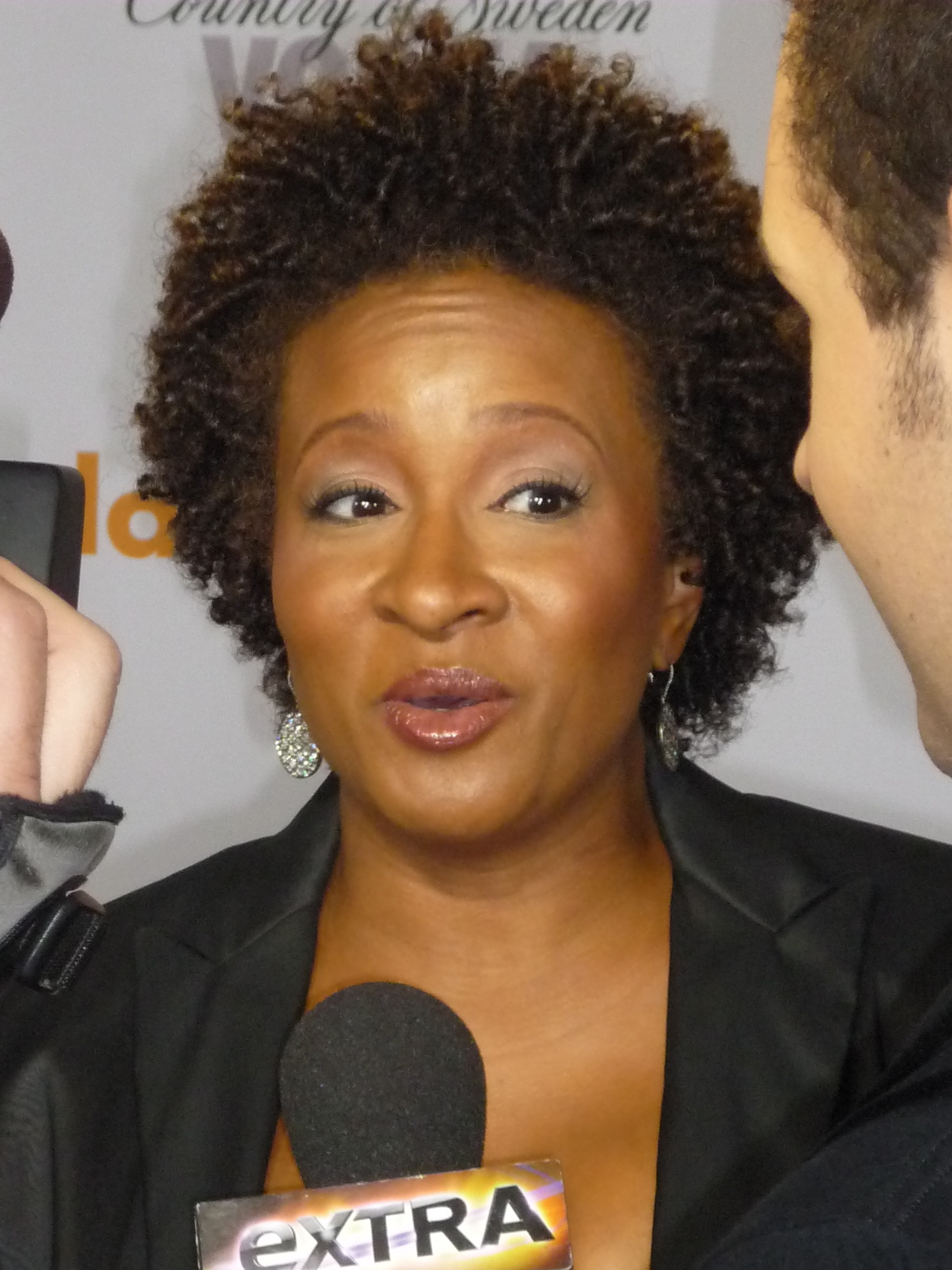
Wanda Sykes at 2010 GLAAD Media Awards

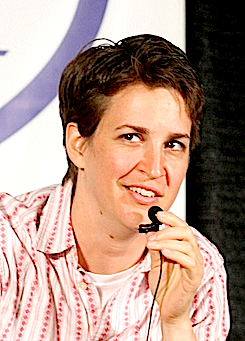
Rachel Maddow (2008)

- Tammy Baldwin became the first open lesbian ever elected to Congress in 1998. In 2012 she became the first openly lesbian or gay senator in American history.
- Ann Bannon, author who, from 1957 to 1962, wrote six lesbian pulp fiction novels known as The Beebo Brinker Chronicles. The books' enduring popularity and impact on lesbian identity earned her the title "Queen of Lesbian Pulp Fiction".
- Audre Lorde, poet, activist.
- Ellen DeGeneres came out as a lesbian in 1997, one of the first celebrities to do so, and later that year her character Ellen Morgan came out as a lesbian on the TV show "Ellen", making her the first openly lesbian actress to play an openly lesbian character on television. In 2007, she became the first open lesbian to host the Academy Awards.
- Lea DeLaria, entertainer.
- Melissa Etheridge, a multiplatinum-selling singer, came out as a lesbian in 1993. In 1995 she won a Grammy and in 2007 she won an Academy Award for Best Song.
- Jane Lynch, an Emmy-winning actress best known for her role on the TV series Glee, is openly lesbian.
- Rachel Maddow became the first openly lesbian or gay American to win an international Rhodes scholarship in 1995, and the first openly lesbian or gay anchor of a major prime-time news program in America in 2008, when she began hosting The Rachel Maddow Show on MSNBC.
- Kate McKinnon, comedian and actress, known for Saturday Night Live and Ghostbusters (2016 film). She became Saturday Night Live's first openly lesbian cast member in 2012. In 2016, she won both an Emmy award and a Critics' Choice Award for her work on Saturday Night Live.
- Carole Migden, politician.
- Elaine Noble, politician.
- Tig Notaro, comedian.
- Hayley Kiyoko, singer-songwriter, dancer, actress. Her 2015 hit single "Girls Like Girls", released two days prior to the historic Supreme Court ruling legalizing same-sex marriage nationwide, has been commended as an "LGBT anthem."
- Linda Perry, singer-songwriter, musician, and record producer. Known as the lead singer of 4 Non Blondes. In 2015, she was inducted into the Songwriters Hall of Fame, becoming the first open lesbian to join.
- Lily Tomlin, award-winning actress, comedian, writer, and voice artist. She is well-known as the voice of Ms. Frizzle on the children's series The Magic School Bus and as Frankie Bergstein on the Netflix series Grace and Frankie.
- Lena Waithe, actress, producer, and screenwriter. In 2017, Waithe won a Primetime Emmy Award for her writing in the episode "Thanksgiving" for Master of None, which was loosely based on her experience coming out as a lesbian.
- Jodie Foster, actress, director, and producer. Foster officially came out in 2013 during her acceptance speech for the Cecil B. DeMille lifetime achievement award.
- Suze Orman, financial consultant.
- Rosie O'Donnell, Actress and talk show host.
- Adrienne Rich, poet, feminist, activist.
- Alison Bechdel, writer, cartoonist.
- Wanda Sykes, a writer, comedian, actress, and voice artist, came out as a lesbian in 2008. She is well known for her role as Barbara Baran on The New Adventures of Old Christine and for her appearances on HBO's Curb Your Enthusiasm.
- Billie Jean King, tennis player.
- Megan Rapinoe, soccer player on the *USWNT

== See also ==
- June L. Mazer Lesbian Archives
- Lesbian erasure
- Lesbian Herstory Archives
- LGBT history in the United States
- LGBT history
- LGBT History Month
- Bisexuality in the United States
- Gay men in American history
- History of transgender people in the United States

== Bibliography ==
- Gallo, Marcia M. Different Daughters: A History of the Daughters of Bilitis and the Rise of the Lesbian Rights Movement, Seal Press, 2007, ISBN 1580052525
