= Ciara Durkin =

First openly LGBT soldier to die in Afghanistan

- Born: July 6, 1977; Galway, Ireland
- Died: September 28, 2007 (aged 30); Bagram Air Base
- Cause of death: Suicide
- Burial place: Arlington National Cemetery
- Military career
- Allegiance: United States
- Massachusetts Army National Guard: Army
- Service years: 2005–2007
- Rank: Corporal (awarded posthumously)
- Unit: 726th Finance Battalion
- Known for: First openly LGBT soldier to die in Afghanistan or Iraq
- Awards: Purple Heart, Army Commendation Medal, National Defense Medal, Afghanistan Campaign Medal, Global War on Terrorism Service Medal

Ciara Marie Durkin (July 6, 1977 – September 28, 2007) was an American soldier who died while serving in Afghanistan. Born in Ireland, she was the first openly lesbian soldier to die in Operation Enduring Freedom. Her death was initially misreported as a result of combat. A lack of information surrounding the details of her death quickly caused controversy when connections were drawn between her death and sexual orientation. Durkin's death was later ruled a suicide, leading to conversations about the dangers of false reporting and the wider narrative regarding suicide among members of the military.

== Biography ==
Ciara Durkin was born in 1977 in Galway, Ireland to Tom Durkin and Angela (née Cloherty) Durkin. She was the eighth of nine children. When she was nine years old, she moved with her family to the United States where they lived in Quincy, Massachusetts. Her father died of a heart attack in 1986, shortly after the family arrived in the United States. In 1996, she graduated from Fontbonne Academy in Milton, Massachusetts. She later went on to a career in information technology.

=== Military career ===
In October 2005, after being made redundant from her role at Fenway Health, a lesbian, gay, bisexual and transgender health care, research and advocacy organization, Durkin joined the Massachusetts Army National Guard. There, she was assigned to the 726th Finance Battalion, based in West Newton, Massachusetts. Prior to her military service, Durkin was open about her sexual orientation as a lesbian and volunteered for gay rights causes. Despite the ongoing military policy of "Don't ask, don't tell", Durkin joined the military to serve her country and give back.

In November 2006, Durkin's unit was first deployed in support of Operation Enduring Freedom. After returning home, her unit redeployed to Afghanistan in February 2007 for a planned year long rotation. In Afghanistan, Durkin worked in a finance role doing payroll in an office within Bagram Air Base. Her office was reportedly three miles inside the base's secure perimeter.

=== Death and aftermath ===
On September 28, 2007, Specialist Durkin died of a single gunshot wound outside the chapel at Bagram Air Base. At the time of her death, Durkin's unit of the Massachusetts National Guard Army reported Durkin's death was from combat-related injuries and that she had "died in action" in Afghanistan. The announcement of her death in combat caused confusion and alarm for her family, who understood Durkin to be working a clerical role. Durkin had previously shared with them that she felt "safer" when deployed to Afghanistan, compared to postings in Iraq. After her death, specialist Durkin was posthumously promoted to corporal.

Durkin's death was recognized as the first openly gay member of the military to be killed in Afghanistan or Iraq. Durkin was locally recognized as the third Massachusetts woman and the first from the South Shore to be killed in Iraq or Afghanistan during Operation Enduring Freedom.

Days after her death was announced, Durkin's cause of death was revised, with the Army reporting it was the result of a "non-combat incident". The Massachusetts National Guard apologized for their mistake, alleging that a guardsman new to his role made Durkin's death announcement in error.

=== Controversy ===
Insignia of Durkin's unit, the 726th Finance Battalion

By October 5, 2006, the Army's official response for the cause of Durkin's death was "undetermined". Rumors surrounding the circumstances of Durkin's death began to circulate as the military released few details to the family in the absence of a full investigation. Knowing she worked in a secure area, the Durkin family initially suspected her death was accidental or the result of friendly fire. At the time, Durkin's family did not suspect her death was a murder, or that it had anything to do with her being openly gay.

After homicide was "not ruled out" in the days following, and the military declined to release further information, parties external to the Durkin family speculated publicly that Durkin's sexual orientation could be a possible motive. Initially raised by the Servicemembers Legal Defense Network and LGBT/ queer aligned press outlets such as Pink News and GO Magazine, others soon raised concerns connecting Durkin's sexuality and death. On October 8, 2007, Aaron Belkin of the Palm Center, a research institute and think tank released a statement,

“While the facts in this case await investigation, we are concerned about the ways in which the ‘don’t ask, don’t tell’ policy could obstruct military investigators’ ability to obtain a full account of the circumstances of a gay or lesbian service member’s death".

Others suggested Durkin's sexuality created a rationale for the Army and the mainstream press to "ignore" her case. In response to increased attention, the Durkin family asked the Irish government and their congressional representatives to press the military for answers. Pressure by the Irish government, Senator John Kerry, and Representative Ted Kennedy put a spotlight on Durkin's case. Seeking information, Kerry helped the Durkin family arrange a second private autopsy of Durkin's body prior to her cremation.

On October 7, 2007, over 2,000 mourners attended Durkin's funeral in Quincy, Massachusetts where she was received with full military honors. Mourners included Massachusetts governor Deval Patrick and Senator Kerry. Durkin's fiancée was recognized in the funeral program as her "best friend".

=== Official investigation ===
After recovering Durkin's body, the Army opened a formal investigation into the circumstances of Durkin's unexpected death. The limited disclosures during the investigation in the following months led the Durkin family and media in the United States and Ireland to raise questions about the Army's procedure and conduct.

Nine months after her death, the investigation returned the cause of suicide, caused by one gunshot to the head. Durkin's family openly questioned the conclusion of suicide. They recounted that Durkin was upbeat before her death, suggesting that Durkin was killed in a hate crime for her sexual orientation, or possibly as in the Pat Tillman case, that she had been killed in a friendly fire incident that the Army was covering up. The official military investigation found no evidence that Durkin was killed in a hate crime. The investigation found Durkin accessed a combat stress clinic on 11 occasions between April and June 2007, and had sent text messages disclosing that she was going to kill herself.

In the years since the Afghanistan and Iraq wars, research has found active duty and veteran members of the military during deployment are at a considerably increased risk of suicide than the general population. In releases after the conclusion of the investigation, allegations connecting Durkin's sexual orientation, death and a possible "cover-up" by the Army, overshadowed reports suggesting that Durkin was actively suicidal at the time of her death.

=== Burial ===
Durkin's cremated remains were split between Ireland and the United States in accordance with her wishes. In 2008, a portion of Durkin's cremated remains were laid to rest with full military honors in Arlington National Cemetery.

== See also ==
- United States military veteran suicide
- Sexual orientation and gender identity in the United States military
