= Fontbonne Academy =

Location
- 930 Brook Road; Milton, (Norfolk County), Massachusetts 02186; United States; 42°15′34″N 71°3′34″W

Information
- Type: Private, All Girls
- Motto: Respect ∙ Responsibility ∙ Reconciliation ∙ Reverence
- Religious affiliations: Roman Catholic, Sisters of St. Joseph
- Established: 1954
- Head of school: Maura Spignesi
- Faculty: 66
- Grades: 7–12
- Enrollment: 311 (2016)
  - Grade 9: 58
  - Grade 10: 81
  - Grade 11: 91
  - Grade 12: 81
- Average class size: 18
- Student to teacher ratio: 9:1
- Colors: Navy blue and gold
- Song: Alma Mater
- Mascot: Ducks
- Team name: Ducks
- Accreditation: New England Association of Schools and Colleges
- Tuition: $21,900
- Alumni: Gina McCarthy
- Website: www.fontbonneacademy.org

Fontbonne Academy is a private Roman Catholic college preparatory high school for girls, located in Milton, Massachusetts, United States. It is located in the Roman Catholic Archdiocese of Boston. It was started in 1954 by the Sisters of St. Joseph. The school was fully accredited in 1959 by the New England Association of Secondary Schools and Colleges. Accreditation has been consistently renewed for ten-year periods. In January 2019, Fontbonne Academy changed its name to Fontbonne Early College of Boston.

== Enrollment ==
Enrollment has multiplied from 97 students in 1954 to just under 400 in 2011. The student body is drawn from more than 45 cities and towns throughout the Boston area, MetroWest, and the South Shore. The school has a seven-acre campus with the original building that has been updated over the years to include science, technology and language labs. The building had a facelift in 2010 and installed many energy-saving improvements throughout. Fontbonne Academy boasts a 100% college acceptance rate. The Class of 2013 averaged $175,000 per student in grants and scholarships to four-year colleges.

== History ==
Founded in 1954, the academy takes its name from Mother St. John Fontbonne, who re-established the congregation in France after its suppression during the French Revolution. Under her leadership, the first Sisters came to the United States. In Boston, the congregation taught in archdiocesan parochial schools, and also founded and conducted its own ministries, of which Fontbonne is one. As a sponsored ministry, Fontbonne Academy furthers the Sisters' charism — a direct outgrowth of the order's experience in revolutionary France — of reconciliation, unity and non-violence in the school's academic programs, spirituality, and co-curricular activities.

=== Employment discrimination controversy ===
In July 2013, Fontbonne Academy rescinded a job offer made to Matthew Barrett, who had been offered a position as food services director, after Barrett listed his husband as his emergency contact on his hiring paperwork. Barrett, represented by attorneys from GLAD, filed a complaint with the Massachusetts Commission Against Discrimination in January 2014. The case moved to Massachusetts Superior Court, and on December 16, 2015, Judge Douglas H. Wilkins ruled in Barrett v. Fontbonne Academy that the Academy had violated the state's anti-discrimination laws. The parties agreed to a confidential settlement in May 2016.

== Alma mater ==
The school song was written by Therese Higgins, CSJ (lyrics) and Berj Zamkochian (music).

== Notable alumnae ==
- Ciara Durkin - the first openly lesbian soldier to die in Operation Enduring Freedom.
- Gina McCarthy - Administrator of Environmental Protection Agency (Class of 1972)

== Memberships ==
- Massachusetts Interscholastic Athletic Association
- New England Association of Schools and Colleges
- Association of Independent Schools of New England (AISNE)
