= Palm Center =

The Palm Center was a think tank founded in 1998 at the University of California, Santa Barbara, that produced scholarship designed to improve the quality of public dialogue about critical and controversial public policy issues. It commissioned and disseminated research in the areas of gender, sexuality, and the military that had been published in leading social scientific journals and cited in the press. The Palm Center was a resource for university-affiliated as well as independent scholars, students, journalists, opinion leaders, and members of the public.

At its founding in 1998, it was known as the Center for the Study of Sexual Minorities in the Military. It was renamed in 2006 in recognition of a one million dollar endowment gift from the Michael D. Palm Foundation.

The Palm Center's research has been cited on the floor of Congress and covered by newspapers and radio and television stations throughout the world. Palm scholars have delivered briefings and lectures at the British Ministry of Defence, the United States Military Academy at West Point, the United States Naval Academy, the United States Air Force Academy, the Army War College, and the National Defense University.

The director of the Palm Center was Aaron Belkin. The Center ceased operations in 2022.
