= Aaron Belkin =

American political scientist and activist

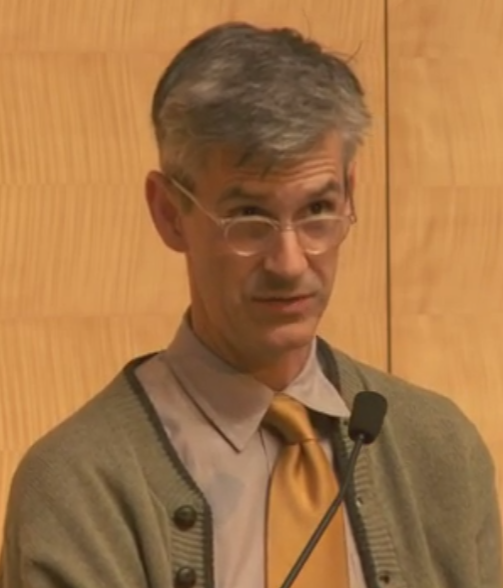
- Belkin in 2014
- Born: March 12, 1966 (age 60); Ohio, U.S.

Academic background
- Education: Brown University (BA); University of California, Berkeley (MA, PhD)

Academic work
- Discipline: Political science
- Institutions: University of California, Santa Barbara; San Francisco State University
- Main interests: Gender and sexuality Military studies Don't ask, don't tell Constitutional rights

Aaron Belkin (born March 12, 1966) is an American political scientist, activist, and author. He teaches political science at San Francisco State University and was the director of the Palm Center, a think tank that commissioned and disseminated research on gender, sexuality and the military.

In 2011, he was a grand marshal in San Francisco's LGBT Pride Parade. He is Jewish.

== Early life and education ==
Belkin was born in Ohio in 1966 and raised in a Jewish household. He attended Hawken School in Gates Mills, Ohio, graduating in 1984. While at Hawken, he was a friend and prom date of LGBTQ+ activist and attorney Roberta Kaplan.

Belkin received a bachelor's degree in international relations from Brown University in 1988. He then attended the University of California, Berkeley, where he received a master's degree in political science in 1992 and a PhD in political science in 1998.

== Career ==
=== Academia ===
Belkin was an associate professor at the University of California, Santa Barbara from 1998 to 2009. While at Santa Barbara, he became the founding director of the Palm Center, a think tank and one of 14 original research centers at the UCSB Institute for Social, Behavioral, and Economic Research dedicated to advocating for the repeal of the don't ask, don't tell policy. Named in memory of LGBTQ+ activist and philanthropist Michael D. Palm, the Palm Center remained closely connected to the University of California system even after it became an independent non-profit.

Belkin has been a professor of political science at San Francisco State University since 2009. He has also been a visiting professor in law and psychology at Stanford University, Hunter College, and the University of California, Hastings. While at San Francisco, Belkin launched Take Back the Court,

=== Activism ===
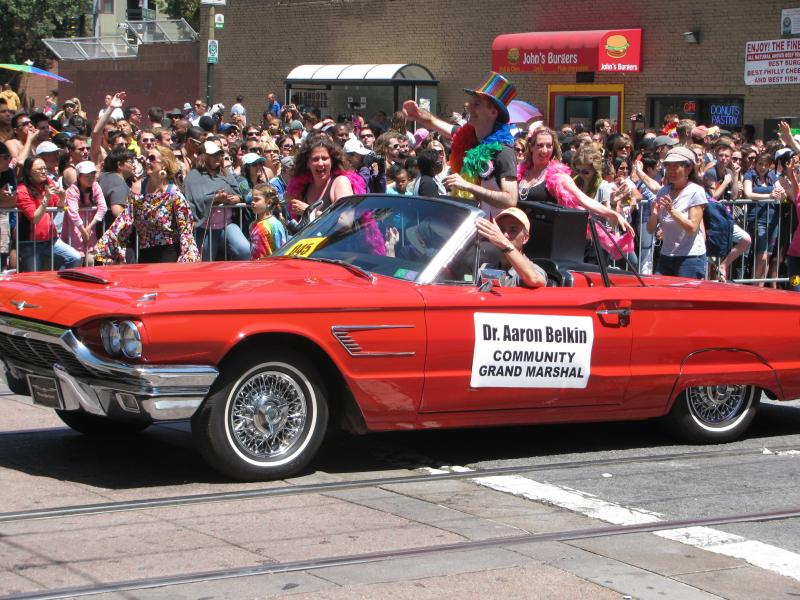
Belkin as grand marshal of the 2011 San Francisco Pride Parade

Belkin founded the Palm Center in 1998 while teaching at the University of California, Santa Barbara. At the Palm Center, Belkin focused on identifying new ways for social science research to convince public opinion. Most notably, he turned this attention toward the campaign to repeal the United States military's don't ask, don't tell (DADT) policy. His 2011 book How We Won outlines these strategies and shows how building public support to end DADT in turn, made it an issue that politicians had to spend less political capital to address. Belkin claimed that the research and evidence always indicated that ending DADT would not in any way destabilize the military, but building a critical mass of public and political support took over a decade of focused action. After DADT was repealed in 2011, he turned his attention to engaging in a national policy conversation on "military service by transgender personnel". Belkin served as the Palm Center's director until its closure in 2022.

Belkin also founded Take Back the Court, an advocacy group promoting expansion of the United States Supreme Court, in 2020. Belkin launched this initiative to add four liberal seats to the Supreme Court after the death of Ruth Bader Ginsburg, which gave the Supreme Court a 6-3 conservative majority. He served as president of Take Back the Court until 2022.

=== Research and writing ===
Belkin has written five books and regularly blogs for the Huffington Post.

== Publications ==
- Bring Me Men: Military Masculinity and the Benign Façade of American Empire, 1898–2001. New York, NY: Columbia University Press, 2012; Oxford University Press, 2013. ISBN 9780231702843. OCLC 816528560.
- How We Won: Progressive Lessons from the Repeal of “Don’t Ask, Don’t Tell". New York, NY: Huffington Post Media Group, 2011. E-book. ISBN 9781611562019.
- United We Stand? Divide and Conquer Politics and the Logic of International Hostility. Albany, NY: State University of New York Press, 2005. ISBN 9780791463437. OCLC 63193418.
- Don’t Ask, Don’t Tell: Exploring the Debates on the Gay Ban in the U.S. Military, co-edited with Geoffrey Bateman. Boulder CO: Lynne Rienner Publishers, 2003. ISBN 9781588261212.
- Counterfactual Thought Experiments in World Politics: Logical, Methodological, and Psychological Perspectives, co-edited with Philip E. Tetlock. Princeton NJ: Princeton University Press, 1996. ISBN 9780691027920.
