= Lana Turner in popular culture =

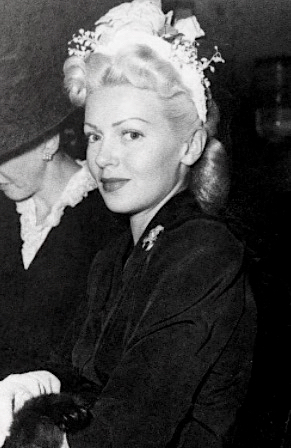
Turner photographed in 1944

Since her rise to fame in the 1940s, American film actress Lana Turner (1921–1995) has appeared and been referenced in numerous works across literature, film, art, and music. Her glamorous persona and publicized personal troubles have contributed to her recurring prevalence in popular culture.

Turner first entered the popular culture lexicon under the nickname "the Sweater Girl" due to her feature film debut in They Won't Forget (1937), in which she appeared in a form-fitting sweater that accentuated her bust. She was the first known person to be given the nickname, which went on to be applied to numerous actresses throughout the 1940s and 1950s. Her subsequent rise to fame at Metro-Goldwyn-Mayer and establishment as a sex symbol enhanced Turner's profile, and she became a popular pin-up model throughout World War II.

While she enjoyed significant popularity as one of MGM's biggest stars, she was also subject to vociferous media attention over her numerous romantic affairs, eight total marriages, and her daughter's 1958 killing of Turner's lover, Johnny Stompanato, during a domestic struggle. The media focus on her storied personal life (particularly the Stompanato homicide) contributed to her cultural prevalence at the time, even sometimes serving as the basis for novels and films.

In her later career and after her death, Turner would go on to appear depicted in numerous artistic works, as well as be studied by social critics and academics in discussions surrounding Hollywood, film theory, gay icons, and camp aesthetics.

== Timeline ==
=== 20th century ===
==== Discovery story ====
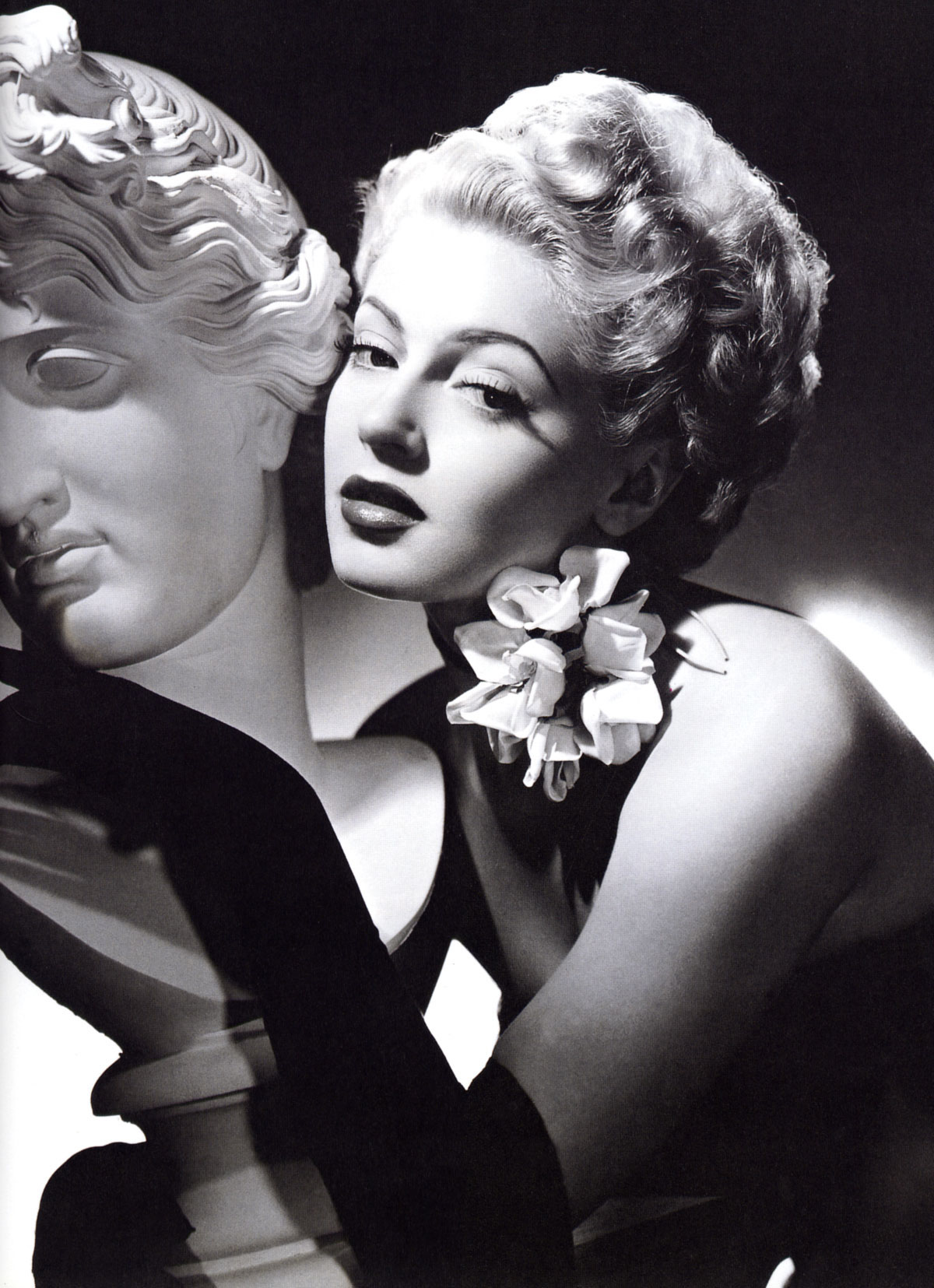
Lana Turner, 1942

The story of Turner's chance discovery by William Wilkerson at a Hollywood malt shop at age 16 was widely circulated during her lifetime, and went on to become a part of Hollywood mythology. Varied accounts as to where the discovery occurred were recounted in publication and via word of mouth during her early career in the late 1930s and early 1940s, with a popular retelling having the meeting occur at Schwab's Pharmacy. Shortly after Turner's rise to fame, the owner of the malt shop in which the discovery took place erected a metal plaque on the seat which Turner had occupied when she met Wilkerson, and soon the shop became inundated with young women hoping to experience the same chance occurrence. Wilkerson's son, journalist William Wilkerson III, wrote on the lasting cultural impact of Turner's discovery in 1995:

On that January day, a Hollywood myth sprang to life. In one brief, glittering moment, a schoolgirl was plucked from a soda fountain counter and catapulted into the eternal firmament of stardom. But, curiously, while Hollywood's history is littered with dozens of noteworthy discovery stories, this one stuck. Lana's much quoted "discovery" became one of the town's most enduring legends. It became famous as "the Hollywood Cinderella Story" because it combined a young girl, Cinderella; a powerful publisher, the handsome prince; and a letter to agent Zeppo Marx, the glass slipper that transformed her life.

Scholar Kim Fields similarly wrote about the lasting cultural relevance of Turner and her discovery story in her 2007 book An Intimate Affair: Women, Lingerie, and Sexuality, noting that it is emblematic of "the American Dream fulfilled ... Because of her, being discovered at a soda fountain has become almost as cherished an ideal as being born in a log cabin."

==== "The Sweater Girl" ====
Following her feature film debut in Mervyn LeRoy's They Won't Forget (1937), Turner was the first woman to receive the nickname the "Sweater Girl" due to her form-fitting attire which accentuated her bust. Though she herself detested the nickname, it was one with which she became synonymous over the duration of her career, and it would come to be applied to several actresses throughout the 1940s and 1950s. Several years after the release of They Won't Forget, Modern Screen journalist Nancy Squires wrote an extensive article on Turner, in which she noted that she had "made a sweater look like something Cleopatra was saving for the next visiting Caesar."

Turner's rise to fame and establishment as a Hollywood sex symbol following They Won't Forget was concurrent with World War II, and she became a prominent pin-up model at the time, appearing painted on the noses of U.S. fighter planes bearing the title "Tempest Turner." MGM appointed her to tour the United States West Coast and sell war bonds in various cities in the summer of 1942. During the tour, Turner began giving out kisses to the highest buyers, and by the end of the 10-week tour, had sold $5.25 million (equivalent to $103.4 million in 2025) in war bonds.

==== Depictions in art ====
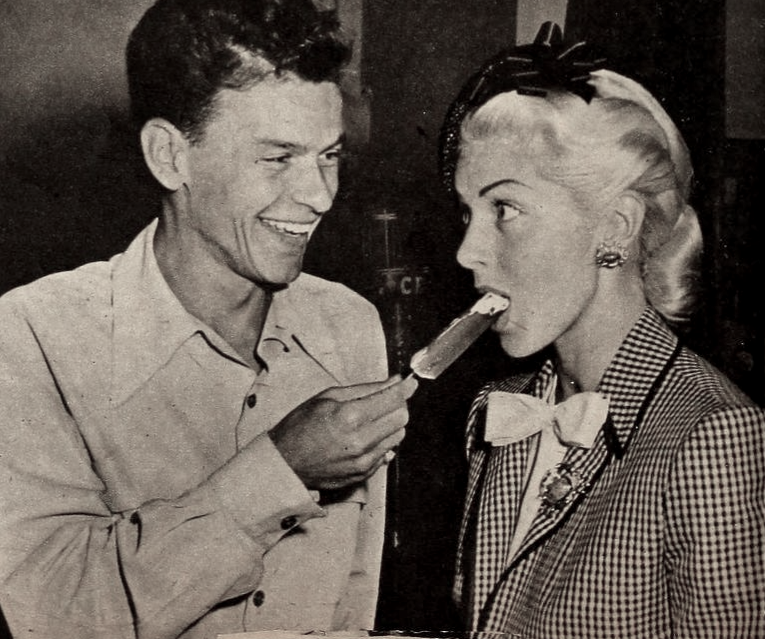
Turner with Frank Sinatra c. 1944

One of the earliest popular culture references to Turner is in Frank Sinatra's 1944 recorded version of "Nancy (with the Laughing Face)." During this time, Turner and Sinatra had been carrying on a romantic affair. She would later be named in Nina Simone's 1958 version of the song "My Baby Just Cares for Me," which appeared on her album Little Girl Blue.

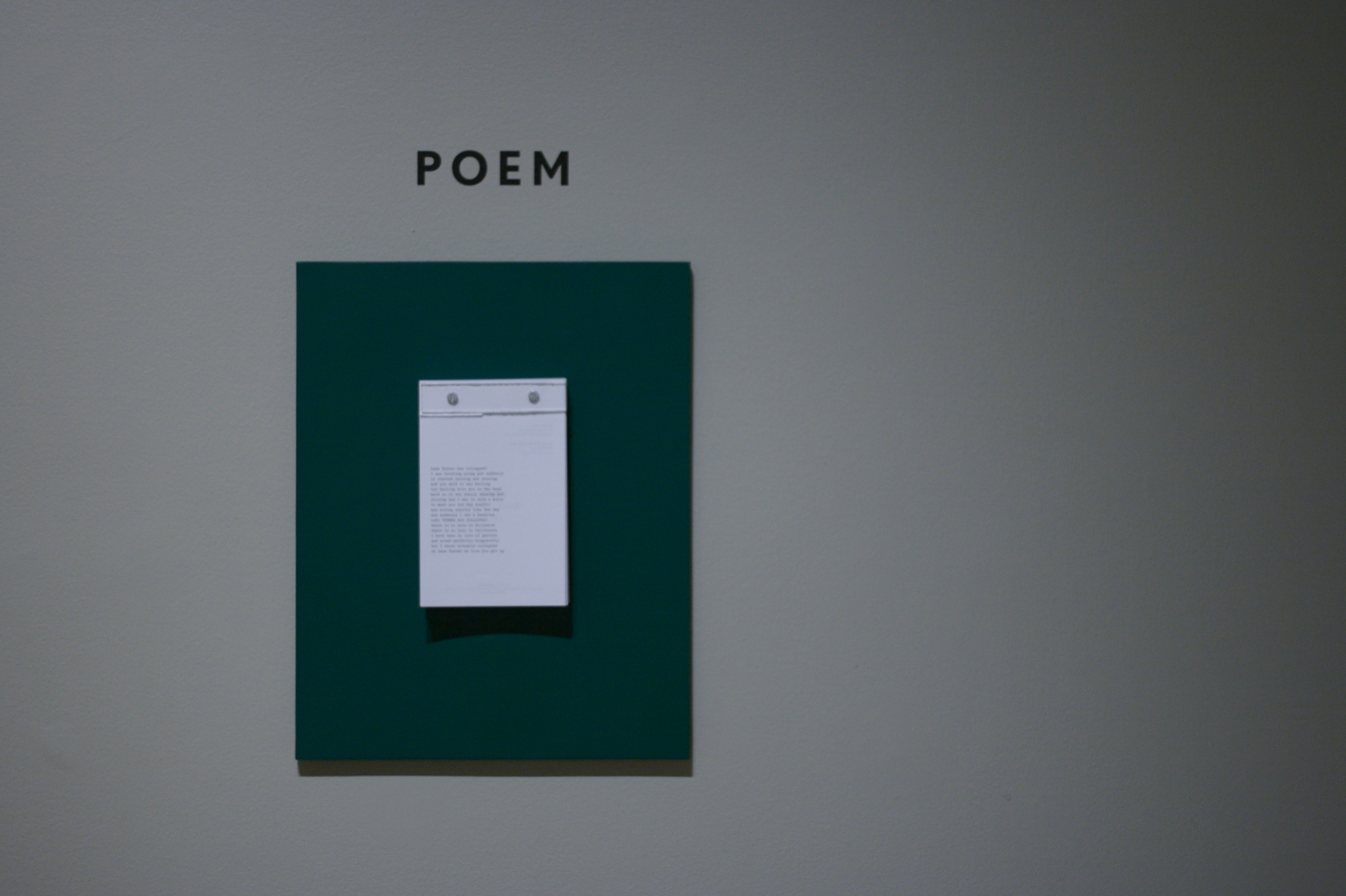
Copies of "Lana Turner has Collapsed" (1964) by Frank O'Hara at the Museum of the City of New York in 2007

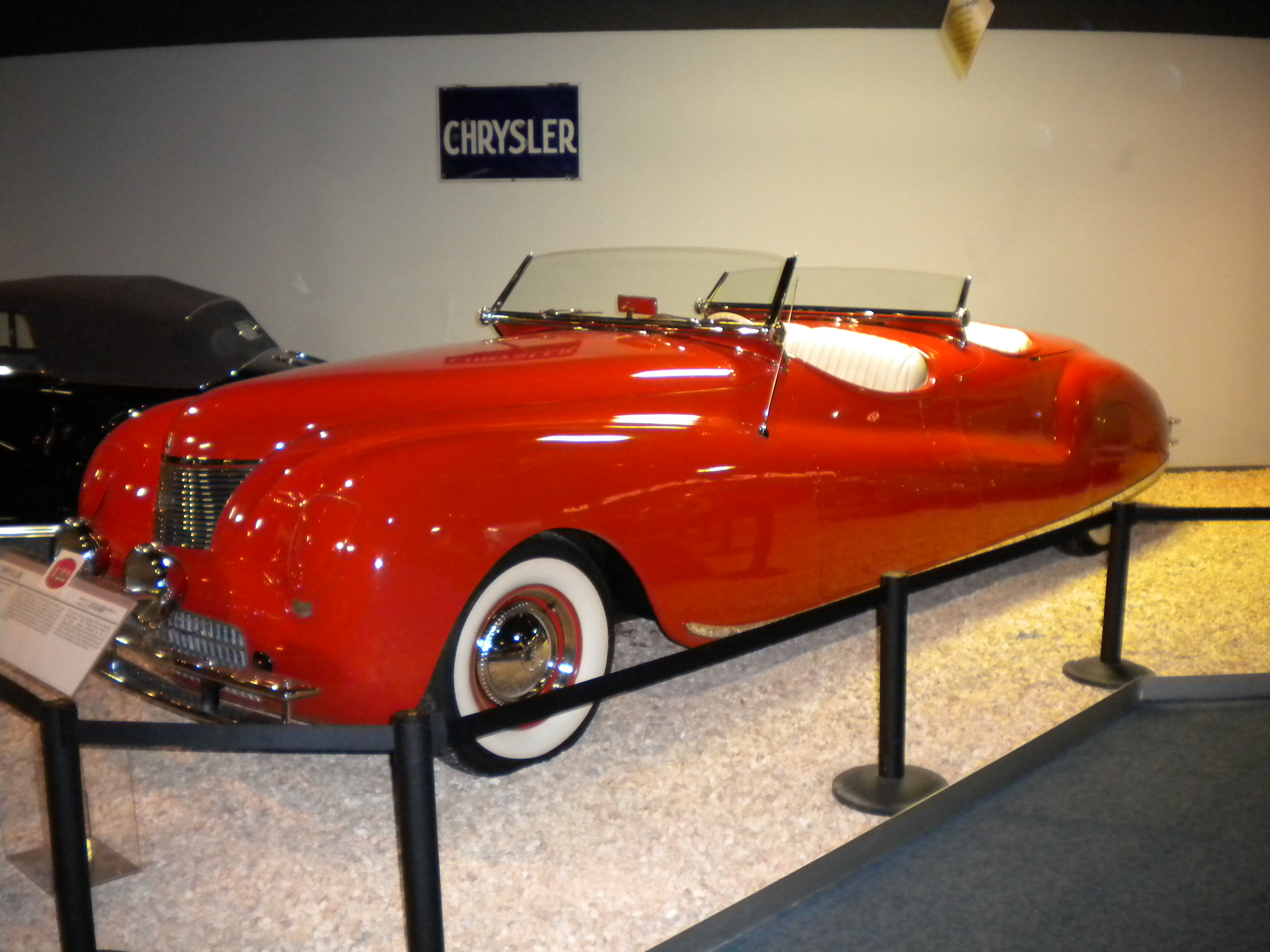
A 1941 Chrysler Newport owned by Turner and her husband, Bob Topping, at the National Automobile Museum

In 1962, writer Harold Robbins published the novel Where Love Has Gone, which was inspired by the scandal surrounding Turner after her daughter, Cheryl Crane, stabbed her lover, Johnny Stompanato, to death during a domestic struggle in their Beverly Hills home. A film adaptation of the novel was made in 1964. In response to the release of the novel and film, Turner told a journalist: "I suppose I'll be getting bugged by that question." The same year, poet Frank O'Hara wrote the poem "Lana Turner has collapsed" (1964), which was based on a headline he had seen stating that Turner had collapsed at a social gathering.

In 1985, artist Andy Warhol produced a silkscreen print of Turner in her youth, and she was photographed by Warhol in Polaroid the same year; one Polaroid image from the shoot would later sell in auction for $3,750.

Writer James Ellroy depicted Turner again (alongside Stompanato) in his 1990 novel L.A. Confidential (1990). Brenda Bakke went on to portray her in a scene of the 1997 film adaptation by director Curtis Hanson. Also in 1990, Turner was referenced on the rap section of Madonna's "Vogue" next to stars from the Golden Age era of Hollywood such as Rita Hayworth, Lauren Bacall, and Marilyn Monroe. Despite her recurring prevalence in popular culture, upon her death in 1995, writer and critic John Updike wrote in The New Yorker that Turner "was a faded period piece, an old-fashioned glamour queen whose fifty-four films, over four decades didn't amount, retrospectively to much ... As a performer, she was purely a studio-made product."

=== 21st century ===
In 2002, Turner was commemorated by artist Eloy Torrez in an outdoor mural, Portrait of Hollywood, painted on the auditorium of Hollywood High School, her alma mater, alongside numerous other famous alumni. Beyoncé Knowles, as a member of Destiny's Child, for a while adopted a look and fashion sense reminiscent of Turner. American singer-songwriter Elizabeth Grant (b. 1985), better known as Lana Del Rey, devised her stage name inspired by Turner and the Ford Del Rey sedan. A 2011 article on Del Rey in The New Yorker described Turner as a "titan of red-lip, Old Hollywood glamour."

== Gay icon ==
Turner's daughter Cheryl Crane, privately came out as a lesbian to her parents at the age of thirteen, and they remained supportive of her.

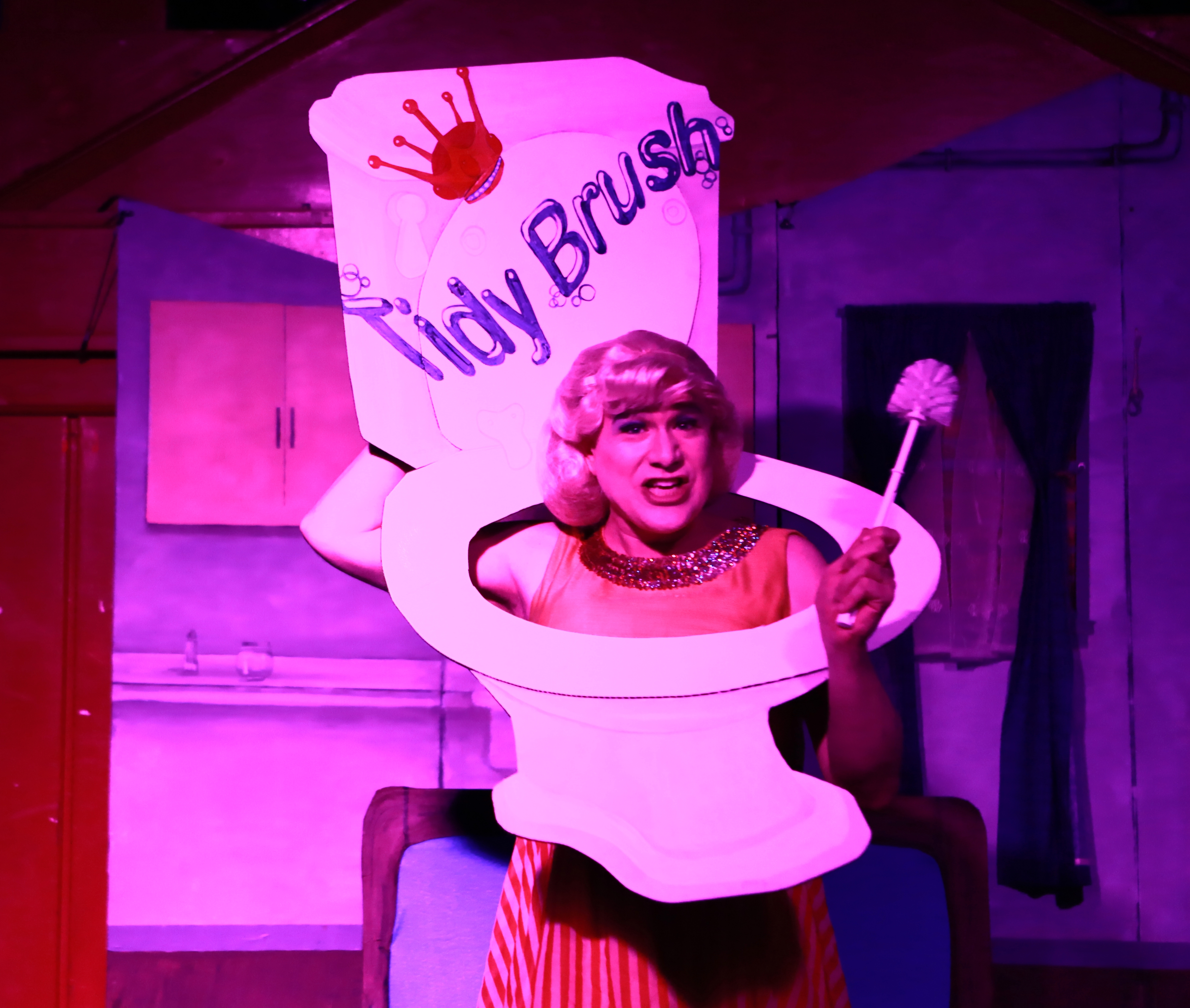
Turner portrayed in drag in a 2013 a Chicago production of Límitation of Life, based on Imitation of Life (1959)

Beginning in the 1970s, it was observed by journalist Sally Quinn of The Washington Post that Turner had accumulated a following of gay men, similar to her contemporaries Judy Garland, Joan Crawford, Bette Davis, and others. One attendee at a 1975 gala celebrating her career told Quinn: "She represents ... homosexuals' fantasies at a certain age in their lives. They identify with her and she's a survivor. It's like they're saying, 'Let's go see how she's survived.'" Subsequent associations with Turner as a gay icon have centered on her personal struggles and triumphs, as well as her glamorous persona and the perceived camp aesthetics of several of her films. Scholars such as Susan Sontag noted the camp qualities of such films as The Prodigal (1955), a Biblical costume drama in which Turner portrayed a pagan temptress.

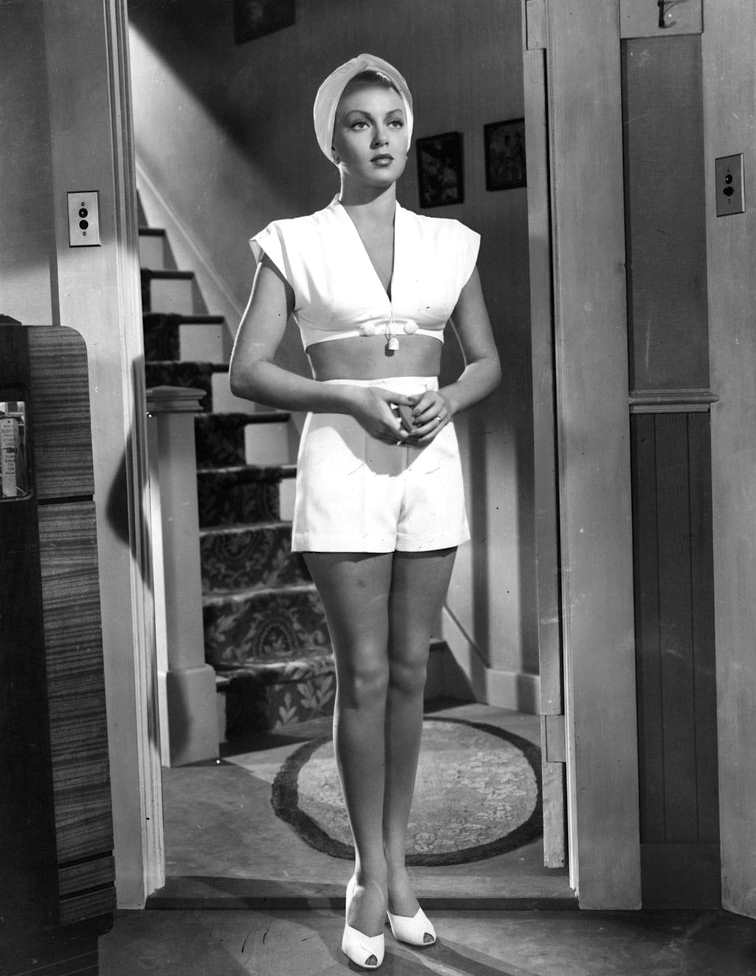
Turner in The Postman Always Rings Twice (1946)

Scholar Georges-Claude Guilbert notes Turner's impact as a gay icon as far back as her appearance in The Postman Always Rings Twice (1946): "[Upon the release of Imitation of Life,] Turner's gay iconocity quotient had already reached a very high level 12 years previously with the release of The Postman Always Rings Twice Even 70 years later one never comes out unscathed from a viewing. The head wrap! The shoes! The shorts! That movie is a lesson in style and in it, Turner is a lesson in stylishness." Additionally, Guilbert notes Turner's personal scandals (such as the 1958 Stompanato killing), frequent romances and eight-total marriages as additional factors in her consideration as a gay icon. Scholar Robin Griffiths also considers Turner a "camp icon" due to her "alternately deadpan and overblown performances." Author Sam Staggs noted of Turner in Imitation of Life:

To Hollywood, Lana was her tight sweater. To Ross Hunter, a closeted gay man unaroused by female flesh, Lana without the sweater meant the opportunity to dress her up in two dozen stunning outfits, like a live Barbie doll. Even that famous sweater, in its day, had symbolized a certain kind of heterosexual camp, redolent of locker rooms, and burlesque. Hunter, hugely abetted by Douglas Sirk, created an entirely new goddess, a Lana Turner who, like Myra Breckinridge, embodies heterosexual and homosexual camp while remaining oddly sexless.

== See also ==
- Lana Turner filmography
- Sweater girl

== Sources ==
- Basinger, Jeanine (1976). Lana Turner. New York: Pyramid Publications. ISBN 978-0-515-04194-1.
- Basinger, Jeanine (2008). The Star Machine. New York: Knopf. ISBN 978-0-307-49128-2.
- Benshoff, Harry; Griffin, Sean (2006). Queer Images: A History of Gay and Lesbian Film in America. Lanham, Maryland: Rowman & Littlefield. ISBN 978-0-742-51971-8.
- Brook, Vincent (2013). Land of Smoke and Mirrors: A Cultural History of Los Angeles. Rutgers, New Jersey: Rutgers University Press. ISBN 978-0-813-55458-7.
- Busch, Niven (December 23, 1940). "Lana Turner". Life. Vol. 9, no. 26. Time, Inc. pp. 62–65. ISSN 0024-3019 – via Google Books.
- Dargis, Manohla (2003). L.A. Confidential. BFI Film Classics. London: Macmillan. ISBN 978-0-851-70944-4.
- Erickson, Hal (2017). Any Resemblance to Actual Persons: The Real People Behind 400+ Fictional Movie Characters. Jefferson, North Carolina: McFarland. ISBN 978-1-476-62930-8.
- Fields, Jill (2007). An Intimate Affair: Women, Lingerie, and Sexuality. Los Angeles: University of California Press. ISBN 978-0-520-22369-1.
- Fischer, Lucy (ed). (1991). Imitation of Life. New Brunswick, New Jersey: Rutgers University Press. ISBN 0-8135-1644-7.
- Fraterrigo, Elizabeth (2011). Playboy and the Making of the Good Life in Modern America. Oxford: Oxford University Press. ISBN 978-0-199-83245-3.
- Griffiths, Robin (2008). Queer Cinema in Europe. Bristol: Intellect Books. ISBN 978-1-841-50079-9.
- Guilbert, Georges-Claude (2018). Gay Icons: The (Mostly) Female Entertainers Gay Men Love. Jefferson, North Carolina: McFarland. ISBN 978-1-476-67433-9.
- Heinrich, Christoph; Breitz, Candace (1999). Andy Warhol Photography. Thalwil/Zürich; New York: Edition Stemmle. ISBN 978-3-908-16310-7.
- Ingham, Chris (2005). Frank Sinatra. New York: Rough Guides. ISBN 978-1-843-53414-3.
- Langer, Carole (dir.) (2001). Lana Turner ... a Daughter's Memoir. Turner Classic Movies. Archived from the original (Documentary) on October 26, 2021.
- Morella, Joe; Epstein, Edward Z. (1971). Lana: The Public and Private Lives of Miss Turner. New York: Citadel Press. ISBN 0-8065-0226-6.
- Parish, James Robert; Bowers, Ronald L. (1973). The MGM Stock Company: The Golden Era. New Rochelle, New York: Arlington House. ISBN 978-0-870-00128-4.
- Raha, Maria (2008). Hellions: Pop Culture's Rebel Women. Berkeley, California: Seal Press. ISBN 978-0-7867-2626-4.
- Sontag, Susan (1966). "Notes on Camp". Against Interpretation. New York: Dell. pp. 277–293. ISBN 978-0-440-50038-4.
- Staggs, Sam (2009). Born to Be Hurt: The Untold Story of Imitation of Life. London: Macmillan. ISBN 978-0-312-37336-8.
- Sutherland, John; Fender, Stephen (2011). Love, Sex, Death and Words: Surprising Tales From a Year in Literature (Reprint ed.). London: Icon Books Ltd. ISBN 978-1-848-31247-0.
