= Alix Kates Shulman =

American novelist

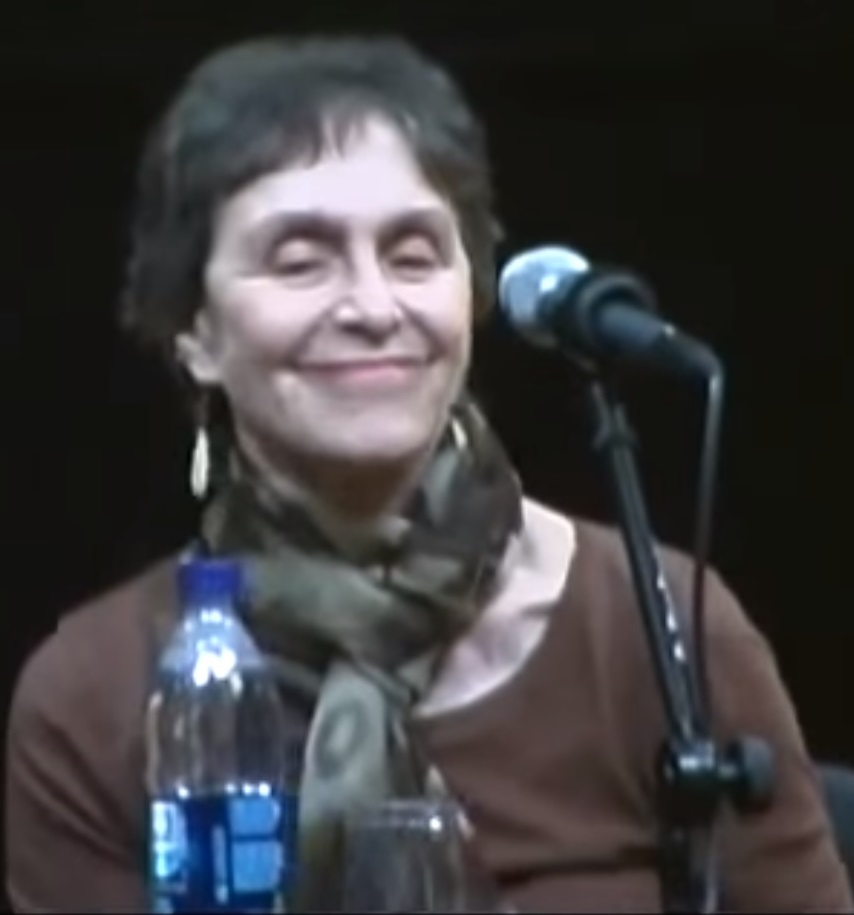
- Shulman at discussion at Elizabeth A. Sackler Center for Feminist Art in 2010
- Born: Alix Kates; August 17, 1932 (age 94); Cleveland, Ohio, U.S.
- Education: Case Western Reserve University (BA); Columbia University; New York University (MA)
- Occupation: Writer
- Website: www.alixkshulman.com

Signature
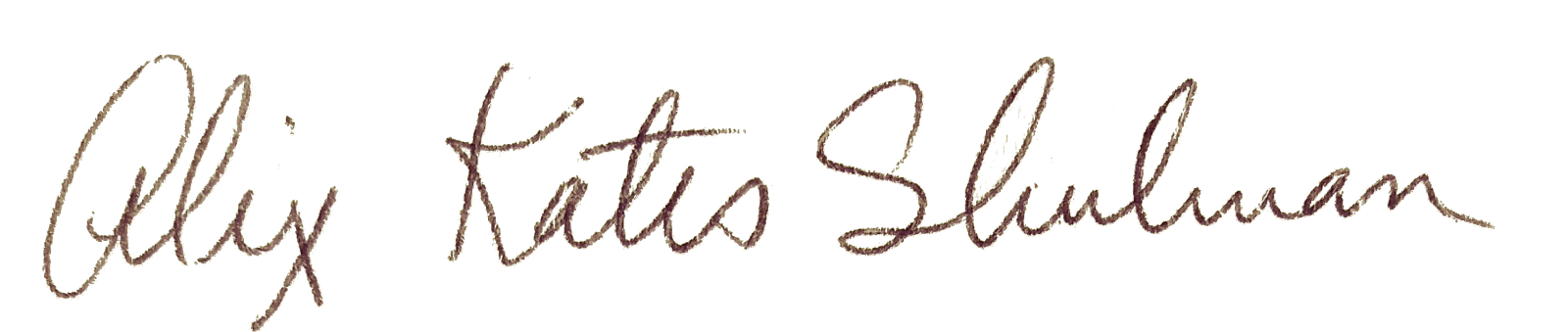

Alix Kates Shulman (born August 17, 1932) is an American writer of fiction, memoirs, and essays, and a prominent early radical activist of second-wave feminism. She is best-known for her bestselling debut adult novel, Memoirs of an Ex-Prom Queen (Knopf, 1972), hailed by the Oxford Companion to Women's Writing as "the first important novel to emerge from the Women's Liberation Movement."

Her books have been translated into 12 languages. She has taught writing and women's literature widely in the U.S., including at the University of Hawaii at Manoa (Honolulu), where she held the Citizens Chair, New York University, The New School, the University of Southern Maine, the University of Colorado at Boulder, and Yale University. She received an honorary doctorate of humane letters from Case Western Reserve University in 2001.

== Early life and education ==
Shulman was born in Cleveland, Ohio, on August 17, 1932, to Dorothy Davis Kates, a community organizer, and Samuel Simon Kates, a labor arbitrator. Her family is Jewish.

After attending Cleveland Heights public schools, in 1953 she received a BA in history and philosophy from Western Reserve University. She then moved to New York City to study philosophy at the Columbia University Graduate School and later received an MA in Humanities from New York University. She was an early member of the feminist organization Redstockings.

== Writing career ==
=== "A Marriage Agreement" ===
Shulman first emerged as the author of the controversial essay "A Marriage Agreement", which proposed that women and men split childcare and housework equally, and detailed a way of doing so. Originally published in the small feminist journal Up From Under in August 1970, it was widely reprinted in large-circulation mainstream magazines like Life and Redbook, as well as in the premier issue of Ms. magazine; it subsequently appeared in a number of anthologies, including a Harvard textbook on contract law.

=== Fiction ===
Following several children's books, Shulman's first adult novel, the seriocomic million-copy Memoirs of an Ex-Prom Queen (Knopf, 1972), was published. A feminist classic, it is the coming-of-age story, from childhood through motherhood, of middle-class, white, sexually precocious and emotionally confused Sasha Davis, as she navigates the pressures, discrimination, and absurdities facing a pre-feminist mid-20th-century young woman of ambition. Almost continuously in print since 1972, it was reissued in a 25th anniversary edition in 1997 by Penguin, a 35th anniversary "Feminist Classics" edition in 2007 by Farrar, Straus & Giroux (FSG), as an e-book in 2012 by Open Road, and in many foreign language editions.

Her next book, Burning Questions (Knopf, 1978), is a historical novel about the rise of the women's liberation movement in late 1960s New York City, an experience Shulman knew firsthand. A fictional autobiography of a white middle-class rebel conscious of class ironies, the novel presents the new movement in a historical tradition of radical and revolutionary women, and “chronicles the important changes in women’s lives and consciousness wrought by contemporary feminism.” A 2017 literary blog described Burning Questions as "the best, most accurate historical novel I have read about the Women's Liberation Movement."

On the Stroll (Knopf, 1981), her third novel, takes on the themes of homelessness, sexual exploitation, and prostitution through the story of a shopping-bag lady and a teenage runaway who is preyed upon by a pimp, over the course of one summer.

Her fourth novel, In Every Woman's Life... (Knopf, 1987), is both a comedy of manners and a novel of ideas. It explores marriage and singleness in light of the social changes brought by second-wave feminism.

Ménage (Other Press, 2012), Shulman's fifth novel, represents a return to fiction after a twenty-five-year departure to memoir. A satire of the wealthy one percent and the literary life, Ménage explores what happens when a real-estate developer and his restless wife invite a literary star to live with them in their mansion. Ménage was described in reviews as “delightfully wicked, verging on the malevolent” (Kirkus Reviews) and "wickedly funny." (Boston Globe)

=== Memoirs ===
In the 1990s Shulman turned from fiction to memoir. Drinking the Rain (FSG, 1995) recounts her experience of going off at age fifty to live alone on an island off the coast of Maine, without electricity, plumbing, road, or phone. As she is thrown back on herself, she learns to love solitude, independence, and the natural world. Drinking the Rain won a 1995 Body Mind Spirit Award of Excellence and was a finalist for the Los Angeles Times Book Prize.

A Good Enough Daughter (Random House, Schocken Books, 1999) is a memoir of her life as a daughter to loving parents, to whom she returns in their old age to see them through their final years.

To Love What Is (FSG, 2008) is Shulman's account of caring for her husband following a 2004 accident that left him seriously brain-impaired. In it she describes their half-century-long love affair and the ways they adapted their lives to his increasing disability.

=== Non-fiction ===
In 2021 Library of America published Women’s Liberation!: Feminist Writings That Inspired a Revolution & Still Can, an anthology of major writings of feminism’s second wave, 1963-1991, co-edited by Shulman and Honor Moore.

In 2012, the essay collection A Marriage Agreement and Other Essays: Four Decades of Feminist Writing was published by Open Road.

Her other non-fiction includes two books on anarchist-feminist Emma Goldman: the biography To The Barricades (T.Y.Crowell, 1971), which was a New York Times Outstanding Book of the Year, and Red Emma Speaks: An Emma Goldman Reader (Random House, 1972). Except for her three children's books–Bosley on the Number Line (David McKay, 1970), Finders Keepers (Bradbury Press, 1971), and Awake or Asleep (Addison Wesley, 1971)–all her titles are available as e-books.

== Activism ==
In the early 1960s Shulman was active in the Congress of Racial Equality (CORE). She named the theater arts chapter, 7-Arts CORE, prior to the group's attending the 1963 March on Washington, and with the group she demonstrated against racial discrimination in New York City.

She became opposed to the Vietnam War, counseling draftees on their rights at the Quaker Meeting House and the Washington Square Methodist Episcopal Church, both in Manhattan. In 1967 she was arrested at a sit-in at the Whitehall Street Induction Center in lower Manhattan. Later, while a visiting professor at the University of Colorado at Boulder in 1985, she was arrested at a large demonstration to keep the CIA from recruiting on campus. On the bus that served as paddy wagon for arrested protesters, she and Beat poet Allen Ginsberg held an impromptu antiwar teach-in.

It was in late 1967 that Shulman first became involved in the Women's Liberation Movement (WLM) in New York City. She participated in the weekly discussion group New York Radical Women, one of the first women’s liberation groups in New York City. Subsequently, she joined several small feminist consciousness-raising groups (Redstockings, WITCH, New York Radical Feminists) and political action groups (CARASA, No More Nice Girls, Feminist Futures, Take Back the Future).

In 1970, the "Wall Street Ogle-In", which involved Shulman and others, took place. The events of September 1968 regarding Francine Gottfried made an impression on second-wave feminists in New York City, and in March 1970, they retaliated in a raid on Wall Street which they dubbed the "Ogle-In", in which a large group of feminists, including Shulman, Karla Jay, and a number of women who had participated in the sit-in at Ladies Home Journal a few weeks before, sexually harassed male Wall Streeters on their way to work with catcalls and crude remarks.

Shulman’s activism included the arts. In 1970 she helped organize Feminists on Children’s Literature (later renamed Feminists on Children’s Media), to examine widespread female stereotypes in children’s books. The group presented its findings to the American Library Association’s annual meeting. In 1971, after their first production, "Rape In," Shulman became a member of the Advisory Board of the Westbeth Playwrights Feminist Collective – a NYC-based feminist theater group – and of the New York Feminist Art Institute. In 1977, she became an associate of the Women's Institute for Freedom of the Press (WIFP), an American nonprofit publishing organization that works to increase communication between women and connect the public with forms of women-based media.

She was one of the planners of the first national demonstration of women's liberation, which catapulted the movement to national attention, the August 1968 Miss America protest in Atlantic City. The beauty standards that were being protested inspired, and became a major theme of, her debut novel, Memoirs of an Ex-Prom Queen.

Shulman's activism included participation, from 1969 onward, in a number of public speak-outs and conferences on such feminist issues as beauty standards, rape, violence against women, abortion, reproductive rights, prostitution, marriage, and motherhood. The goal of the speak-out was to initiate a public dialogue on experiences that at the time were widely considered private or taboo subjects of speech. In the film Speak Out: I Had an Abortion, Shulman and other subjects testify to having had multiple abortions. Shulman said that "not one was the result of carelessness" but, rather, all were due to the failure of the birth control devices she used.

In 1975, Shulman joined the faculty of Sagaris, a radical feminist institute held in Lyndonville, VT, which operated as a summer think tank and school for feminist activism (1975-1977).

Along with other "sex-positive" feminists, Shulman joined the Feminist Anti-Censorship Task Force (FACT), a group founded in 1989 to defend free speech from efforts by the anti-pornography wing of the movement to promote government intervention against pornography.

In 1992, as a visiting professor at the University of Hawaii, in Honolulu, she was a founder of a Pacific chapter of the pro-choice political action group No More Nice Girls. The Pacific chapter organized demonstrations, held a speak-out on abortion, and put on street theater in Honolulu.

In the 1990s, she was active on the board of THEA (The House of Elder Artists), an organization attempting to establish a new kind of retirement community in Manhattan for politically and artistically active seniors. That group did not succeed, but Shulman continued her anti-ageist activism through her writing.

In 2012, Shulman joined the Occupy Wall Street movement and soon became part of the women's caucus, Women Occupy Wall Street, which put on four Feminist General Assemblies around New York City.

Shulman is featured in three documentaries on second-wave feminist history: She's Beautiful When She's Angry; Makers: Women Who Make America, Part I; and Feminist Stories from Women's Liberation 1963-1970.

== Honors ==
In 1979 Alix Shulman was awarded a DeWitt Wallace/Reader's Digest Fellowship; in 1982 she was a visiting artist at the American Academy in Rome; in 1983 she received a National Endowment for the Arts Fellowship in fiction; in 1982–1984 she was elected VP of the PEN America Center; in 1998 she was a fellow at the Rockefeller Foundation Center in Bellagio, Italy; in 2000 she received the Woman 2000 Trailblazer Award from the Mayor of Cleveland; in 2001 she was awarded an honorary doctorate from Case Western Reserve University; in 2010 she received the American Jewish Press Association Simon Rockower Award; in 2012 she became a fellow of the New York Institute for the Humanities; in 2016 she was awarded a Patricia & Jerri Magnione Fellowship from The MacDowell Colony; and in 2018 she received a Clara Lemlich award for a lifetime of social activism.

== Personal life ==
Shulman was married for a short time to a graduate student in the English department at Columbia. In 1959 she married her second husband, Martin Shulman, with whom she had two children. Following their divorce, in 1989 she married Scott York, whom she had first dated when she was in high school, and lived with him until his death in 2014. His 2004 traumatic brain injury led her to become an advocate for the elderly and disabled.

Shulman's daughter, Polly Shulman, is an author. Her son, Theodore Shulman, a pro-choice activist, was arrested by the Federal Bureau of Investigation in February 2011, on charges of making interstate threats to anti-abortion advocates. In October 2012 he was sentenced by federal judge Paul Crotty to 41 months in prison.

== Books ==
- Bosley on the Number Line (1970)
- To The Barricades (1971)
- Finders Keepers (1971)
- Awake or Asleep (1971)
- Memoirs of an Ex-Prom Queen (1972)
- Red Emma Speaks: An Emma Goldman Reader (1972)
- Burning Questions (1978)
- On the Stroll (1981)
- In Every Woman's Life... (1987)
- Drinking the Rain (1995)
- A Good Enough Daughter (1999)
- To Love What Is (2008)
- Ménage (2012)
- A Marriage Agreement and Other Essays: Four Decades of Feminist Writing (2012)
- Women’s Liberation!: Feminist Writing That Inspired a Revolution & Still Can (2021)

== See also ==
- List of Case Western people
