= Berkeley Carroll School =

Prep school in New York City, New York, US

Coordinates: 40°40′32″N 73°58′26″W

- Park Slope, Brooklyn; United States

Information
- School type: Independent
- Established: 1886 (Berkeley Institute); 1966 (Carroll Street School); 1982 (consolidation)
- Head of school: Dr. Lisa Yvette Waller
- Faculty: Fulltime : 110
- Grades: PreK – 12
- Gender: Co-educational
- Enrollment: Total: 900
- Colors: Maroon and white
- Mascot: The Lion
- Rival: Packer
- Accreditations: NAIS, NYSAIS
- Newspaper: The Blotter
- Website: http://www.berkeleycarroll.org

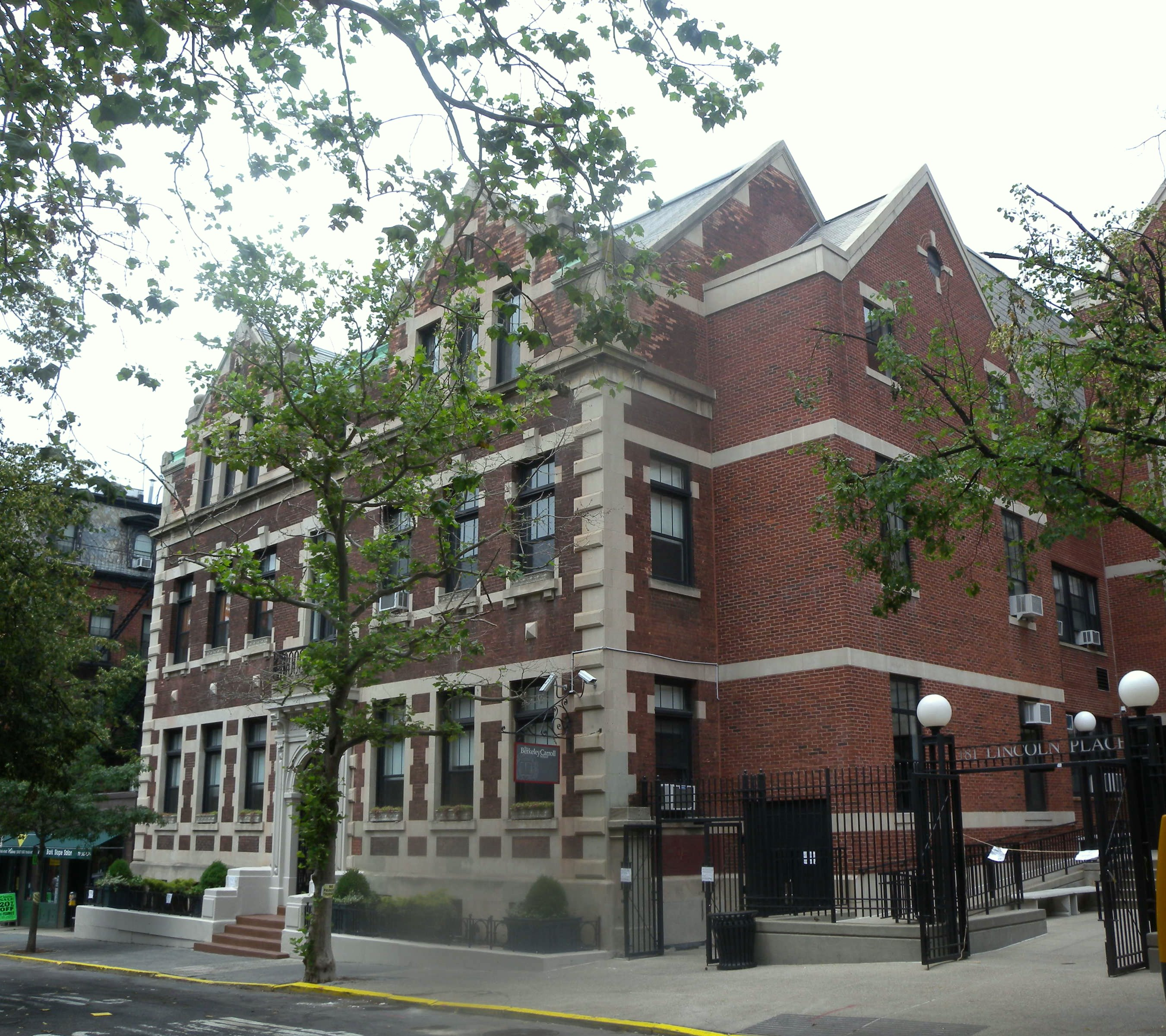
The Middle and Upper School building at 181 Lincoln Place

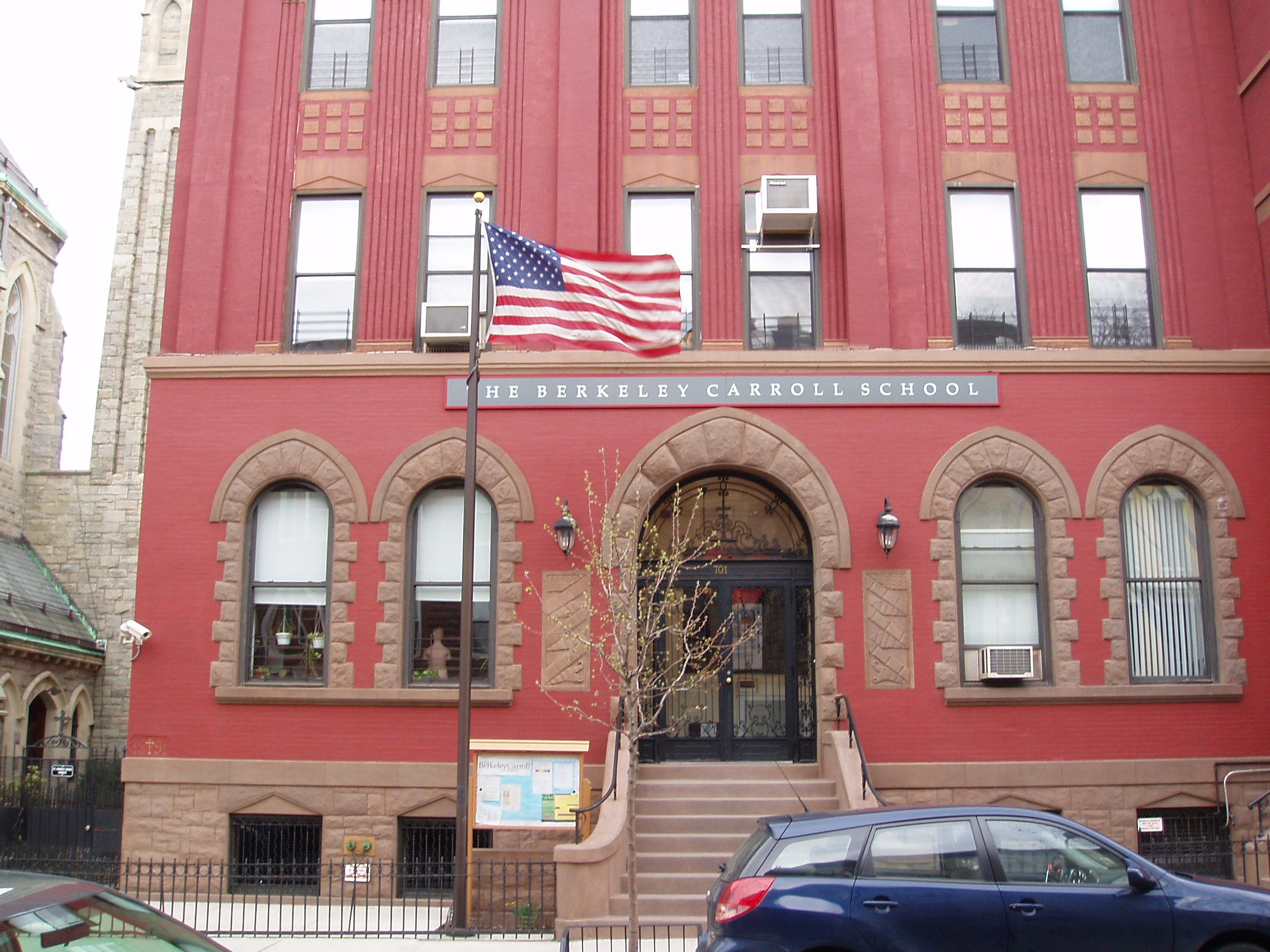
The Lower School building on Carroll Street

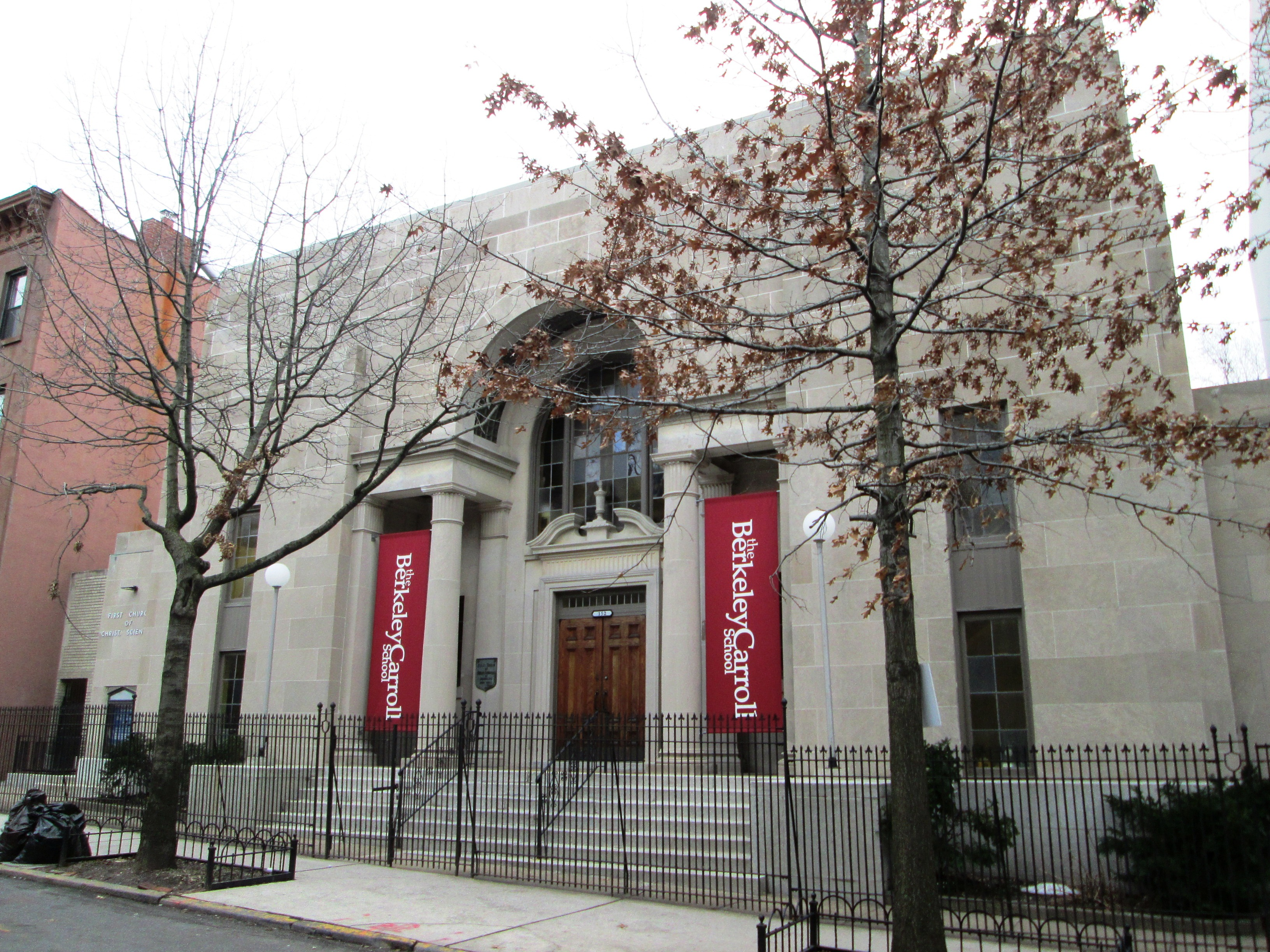
The former First Church of Christ Scientist at 156 Sterling Place is home to Berkeley Carroll's 400-seat Marlene Clary Performance Space, which was finished in 2016, classrooms and offices.

The Berkeley Carroll School is a coed independent college prep school in New York City, United States. Located in Park Slope, Brooklyn, it has a Lower School (preK – grade 4), Middle School (grades 5–8) and Upper School (grades 9–12).

== History ==
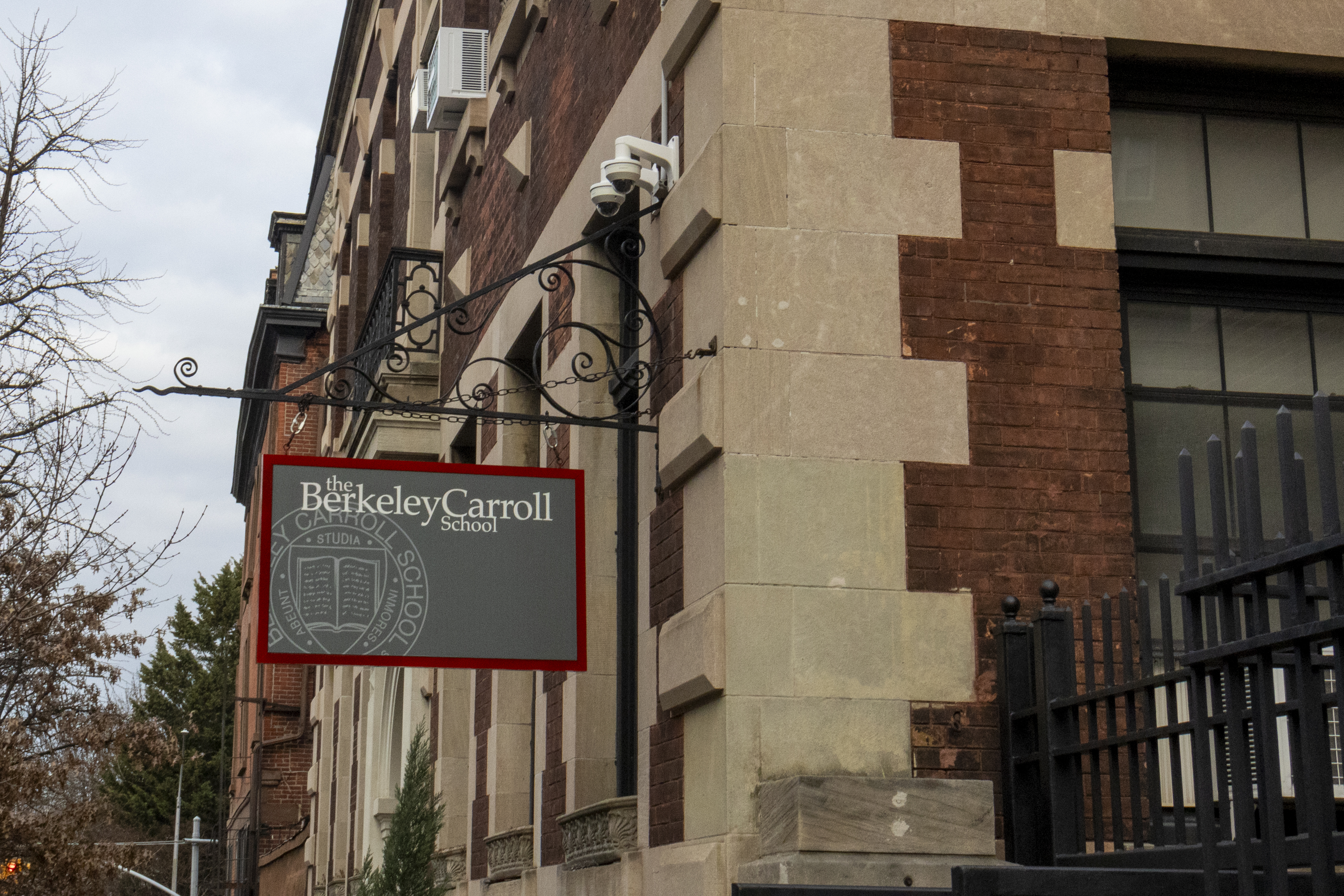
The Berkeley Carroll School's Middle and Upper School Sign

The Berkeley Carroll School was officially chartered by the New York state government on April 12, 1886, as a school for "the education of young ladies" under the name Berkeley Institute. Within a decade, boys were being admitted to the kindergarten through fourth grade. The school went fully co-educational in 1974.

== Recognition ==
In 2016, New York Magazine called Berkeley Carroll "the Harvard of Brooklyn's K-12 institutions."

Berkeley Carroll's STEAM initiative and focus on the role of technology in education has received national attention. In 2016, Mashable called its visit to a sixth grade coding class “a riveting experience” and in 2014, The New York Times quoted Middle School Director Jim Shapiro on helping students unplug occasionally.

The GRAMMY Foundation chose Berkeley Carroll Arts Director Peter Holsberg as the only NYC semifinalist for its 2016 Music Educator Award.

== Notable alumni ==
- Fabiano Caruana '10 – Chess grandmaster
- Helen Gahagan Douglas '20 – Congresswoman and actress
- Margaret Farrar '16 – New York Times crossword puzzle editor from 1942 to 1968
- Maxine Greene '34 – Educational philosopher, author, and social activist
- Karla Jay '64 – Professor and gay rights activist
- Rebecca Naomi Jones '99 – Actress
- Lois Lowry '54 – Author
- Adam Ottavino '03 – professional baseball player
- Robb Paller '11 - American-Israeli baseball player
- Sarah Paulson – Actress
- Dorothy Sarnoff '31 – Operatic soprano, musical theater actress, and self-help guru
- Richie Palacios '14 - professional baseball player
- Carla Gallo -actress (bones, californications
