= Karla Jay =

Distinguished professor emerita at Pace University

- Born: Karla Jayne Berlin; February 22, 1947 (age 79); Brooklyn, New York
- Education: Berkeley Institute; Barnard College; New York University
- Occupations: Author, Editor, Activist
- Writing career
- Genres: Memoir, essay, literary criticism
- Subject: Lesbian studies
- Movements: Feminist and LGBT
- Website: karla-jay.com

Karla Jay (born February 22, 1947) is an American retired academic. She is a professor emerita at Pace University, where she taught English and directed the women's and gender studies program between 1974 and 2009. A pioneer in the field of lesbian and gay studies, she is widely published.

== Early life and education ==
Jay was born Karla Jayne Berlin in Brooklyn, New York, to Rhoda and Abraham Berlin, who worked for a dunnage company on the Red Hook (Brooklyn) docks. Raised in a non-observant, largely secular Jewish home, she attended the Berkeley Institute, a private girls' school in Brooklyn. In 1964 she enrolled at Barnard College, where she majored in French and graduated in 1968 after having taken part in the student demonstrations at Columbia University.

== Career ==
While she shared many of the goals of the radical left-wing of the late 1960s, Jay was at odds with the male-supremacist behavior of many of the movement's leaders. In 1969, she became a member of Redstockings. Jay, who had been aware of her lesbianism since high school, came out to her consciousness-raising group in Redstockings. At around the same time she began using the name Karla Jay to reflect her feminist principles.

When activists founded the Gay Liberation Front (GLF) in the wake of the Stonewall Riots of June 1969, Jay, openly lesbian, became an early member and an active participant. She balanced attendance at GLF meetings with graduate school at New York University, where she majored in comparative literature. She was one of the few women actively involved in the early gay rights movement on both coasts.

Jay, along with Lee Mason and other LGBT+ artists and activists helped create the Gay-In III festival in Griffith Park, Los Angeles in September 1970. This festival was intended to be, in the words of Karla Jay herself, one of “these queer ‘love fests’... and [they] included kissing booths, face painting, marijuana, vodka-spiked oranges, guerilla theatre, fake marriages, voter registration and advice regarding arrests.” In reality, the festival was poorly attended but continued the precedent of such festivals, such as the ubiquitous gay pride parades. Jay reflects on the intentions behind the gay-in as an essential part of more serious aspects of the gay rights movement: “If we dared to hold hands and party in public, we knew unimaginable rights might follow. And they did.”

Jay was a member of Lavender Menace, a group that formed to protest the exclusion of lesbians from mainstream Women's Liberation. She was involved in the planning and execution of the "Lavender Menace Zap" at the Second Congress to Unite Women in New York City in May 1970. This zap is considered a turning-point in the history of second-wave feminism.

Also in 1970, the "Wall Street Ogle-In" took place. The events of September 1968 regarding Francine Gottfried made an impression on second-wave feminists in New York City, and in March 1970, they retaliated in a raid on Wall Street which they dubbed the "Ogle-In", in which a large group of feminists, including Jay, Alix Kates Shulman, and a number of women who had participated in the sit-in at Ladies Home Journal a few weeks before, sexually harassed male Wall Streeters on their way to work with catcalls and crude remarks.

Working with Allen Young Jay edited Out of the Closets (1972), a pioneering anthology that gave voice to the Radicalesbians, Martha Shelley, and writers such as Rita Mae Brown. It was during the 1970s that Jay first heard about Natalie Clifford Barney and Renée Vivien, two prominent lesbian writers living as expatriates in Paris from the early 1900s. Their lives and works became the subject of Jay's doctoral dissertation, published by Indiana University Press as The Amazon and the Page (1988).

Jay contributed the essay "Confessions of a Worrywart: Ruminations on a Lesbian Feminist Overview" to the anthology Sisterhood Is Forever: The Women's Anthology for a New Millennium (2003), edited by Robin Morgan.

At the presentation of Pace University's 10th Annual Dyson Distinguished Achievement Awards on April 6, 2006, Jay was honored with the Distinguished Faculty Award. She received the Bill Whitehead Award for Lifetime Achievement from Publishing Triangle in 2006.

Jay is featured in the feminist history film She's Beautiful When She's Angry.

Her papers are held in the Archives & Manuscripts Division of the New York Public Library.

== Works ==
=== Books ===
- Karla Jay (1988). The Amazon and the Page: Natalie Clifford Barney and Renee Vivien (1st ed.). Bloomington, Indiana: Indiana University Press. ISBN 978-0253304087.
- Karla Jay (1999). Tales of The Lavender Menace: A Memoir of Liberation (1st ed.). New York, New York: Basic Books. ISBN 978-0465083640.

=== Editor ===
- Karla Jay; Allen Young, eds. (1972). Out of the Closets: Voices of Gay Liberation (1st ed.). New York: Douglas Book Corp. ISBN 088209016X.
- Karla Jay; Allen Young, eds. (1975). After You're Out: Personal Experiences of Gay Men and Lesbian Women (1st ed.). New York: Links Press. ISBN 0825630568.
- Karla Jay; Allen Young, eds. (1979). Lavender Culture (1st ed.). New York, New York: Jove Publications. ISBN 0515044628.
- Karla Jay; Allen Young, eds. (1979). The Gay Report: Lesbians and Gay Men Speak Out about Sexual Experiences and Lifestyles (1st ed.). New York, New York: Summit Books. ISBN 978-0671400132.
- Karla Jay; Joanne Glasgow, eds. (1990). Lesbian Texts and Contexts: Radical Revisions (1st ed.). New York, New York: New York University Press. ISBN 0-8147-4175-4.
- Karla Jay, ed. (1995). Lesbian Erotics (1st ed.). New York, New York: New York University Press. ISBN 978-0814742259.
- Karla Jay, ed. (1995). Dyke Life: From Growing Up To Growing Old, A Celebration Of The Lesbian Experience (1st ed.). New York, New York: Basic Books. ISBN 0-465-03907-3.

=== Journals and media ===
- Jay, Karla (2000). "Karla Jay: An Interview with Lynda Hall". Journal of Lesbian Studies. 4 (4): 79–86. doi:10.1300/J155v04n04_07. ISSN 1089-4160. PMID 24802685. S2CID 41649157.
- Jay, Karla (October 18, 2019). "Missing: Lesbians at the CNN LGBT Town Hall". Los Angeles Blade.
- Jay, Karla (May 15, 2020). "Sheroes: The Lesbian Stonewall". Los Angeles Blade.

=== Essays ===
- Schneider Jr., Richard, ed. (2019). "L.A. Spring, 1970. Karla Jay". In Search of Stonewall: The Riots at 50, The Gay & Lesbian Review at 25, Best Essays, 1994–2018 (1st ed.). Boston, Massachusetts: G&LR Books. ISBN 978-0578411088.
- Weinberg, Jonathan, ed. (2019). "Karla Jay on Gay-In III". Art after Stonewall, 1969–1989 (1st ed.). New York, New York: Rizzoli Electa. p. 40. ISBN 978-0847864065.

=== Thesis ===
- Karla Jay (1984). The Disciples of the Tenth Muse: Natalie Clifford Barney and Renée Vivien (PhD). New York University. OCLC 12716008.
