= Francine Gottfried =

US clerk (born 1947)

Francine Gottfried (born 1947) is a former clerical worker in New York City's Financial District. Gottfried gained rapid recognition in September 1968 when an escalating number of men started observing her during her daily commute. Referred to as the "Wall Street's Sweater Girl" by the press, her appealing physique became the focal point that attracted crowds whenever she appeared in the financial district.

== Fame ==
Gottfried started working at Chemical Bank in the Financial District of Manhattan on May 27, 1968. By late August, a small band of male admirers had noticed her as she traveled the same route each day. They timed her daily arrival and spread the word to their male co-workers. For three weeks, the crowd of gawkers grew steadily larger until, on September 18, there were 2000 people waiting to watch her stroll by.

By this point, the crowd itself had become the phenomenon drawing the crowd. On September 19, over 5000 Financial District employees left work and poured into the streets at 1:15pm to watch Gottfried exit the New York City Subway station and walk to her job at the Chemical Bank New York Trust Company's downtown data processing center. Police closed the streets and escorted her through the mob, which damaged three cars as men climbed on their roofs to gain a better view. Stockbrokers and bankers leaned out of windows overlooking Wall Street to watch as trading came to a virtual halt. "Ticker tapes went untended and dignified brokers ran amok," wrote New York magazine. Photographers from all the daily papers and Life, Time, and New York took her picture. "A Bust Panics Wall Street As The Tape Reads 43" read a headline in the Daily News.

The following day, Friday, September 20, the corner of Wall and Broad was jammed with 10,000 spectators and press who waited for Gottfried in vain. Her boss had called and asked her to stay home to put a stop to the disturbances. Gottfried, who lived at home with her parents in Williamsburg, Brooklyn, was not seeking fame and started taking a different route to work. "I think they're all crazy," she was quoted as saying. "What are they doing this for? I'm just an ordinary girl." On October 4, publicists took other busty women to Wall Street as rivals for Gottfried's attention: Mrs. Geri Stotts, an office manager flown in from Burbank, California by a Los Angeles radio station, and Ronnie Bell, a stripper in a New York burlesque house.

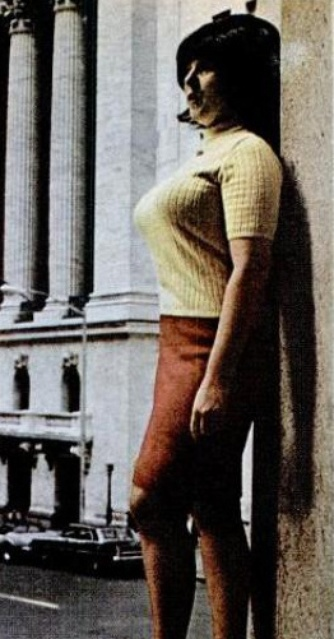
Francine Gottfried

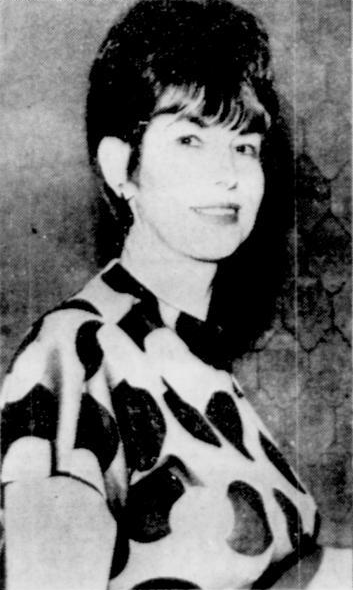
Geri Stotts

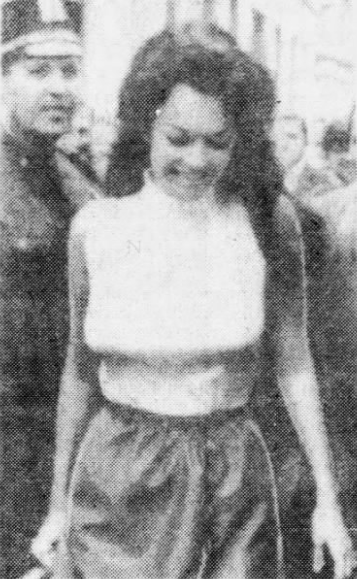
Ronnie Bell

== Responses ==
Although Gottfried made it clear to interviewers that she was willing to entertain movie and modeling offers, her 15 minutes of fame were soon over and she quickly faded into obscurity. Brief accounts of the crowd-gathering phenomenon she triggered subsequently appeared in a number of sociological and pop historical books, some treating it as a survival of the so-called "bosom mania" of the 1950s. A folk song about her, slyly contrasting the crowd that went to see her with the one welcoming presidential candidate Richard Nixon nearby, was published in Broadside magazine. Artist and prankster Joey Skaggs offered a facetious show of support by hanging a 50-foot black bra from the U.S. Treasury building on Wall Street opposite the stock exchange. She dined with the Apollo 10 astronauts, and Esquire awarded her a "Dubious Achievement" award, depicting her with other "dubious achievers" on the cover of the January 1970 issue. She was referenced as a cultural icon of the era in Thomas Hauser's novel Finding the Princess.

The events of September 1968 made an impression on second-wave feminists in the city, and in March 1970, they retaliated in a raid on Wall Street which they dubbed the "Ogle-In", in which a large group of feminists, including Karla Jay, Alix Kates Shulman, and a number of women who had participated in the sit-in at Ladies Home Journal a few weeks before, sexually harassed male Wall Streeters on their way to work with catcalls and crude remarks.
