= Sweater girl =

Actress well-known for wearing tight clothing

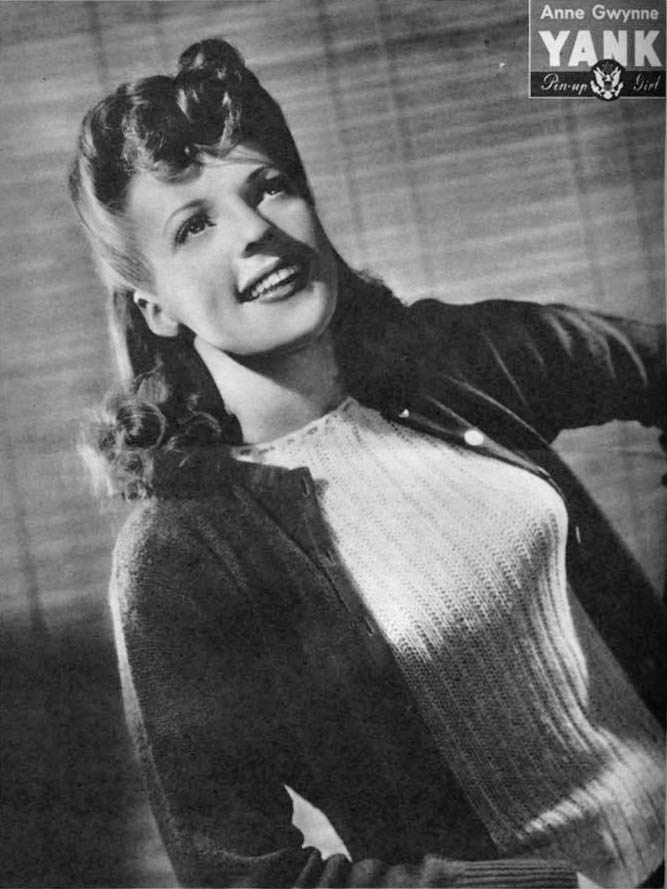
Anne Gwynne, 1943

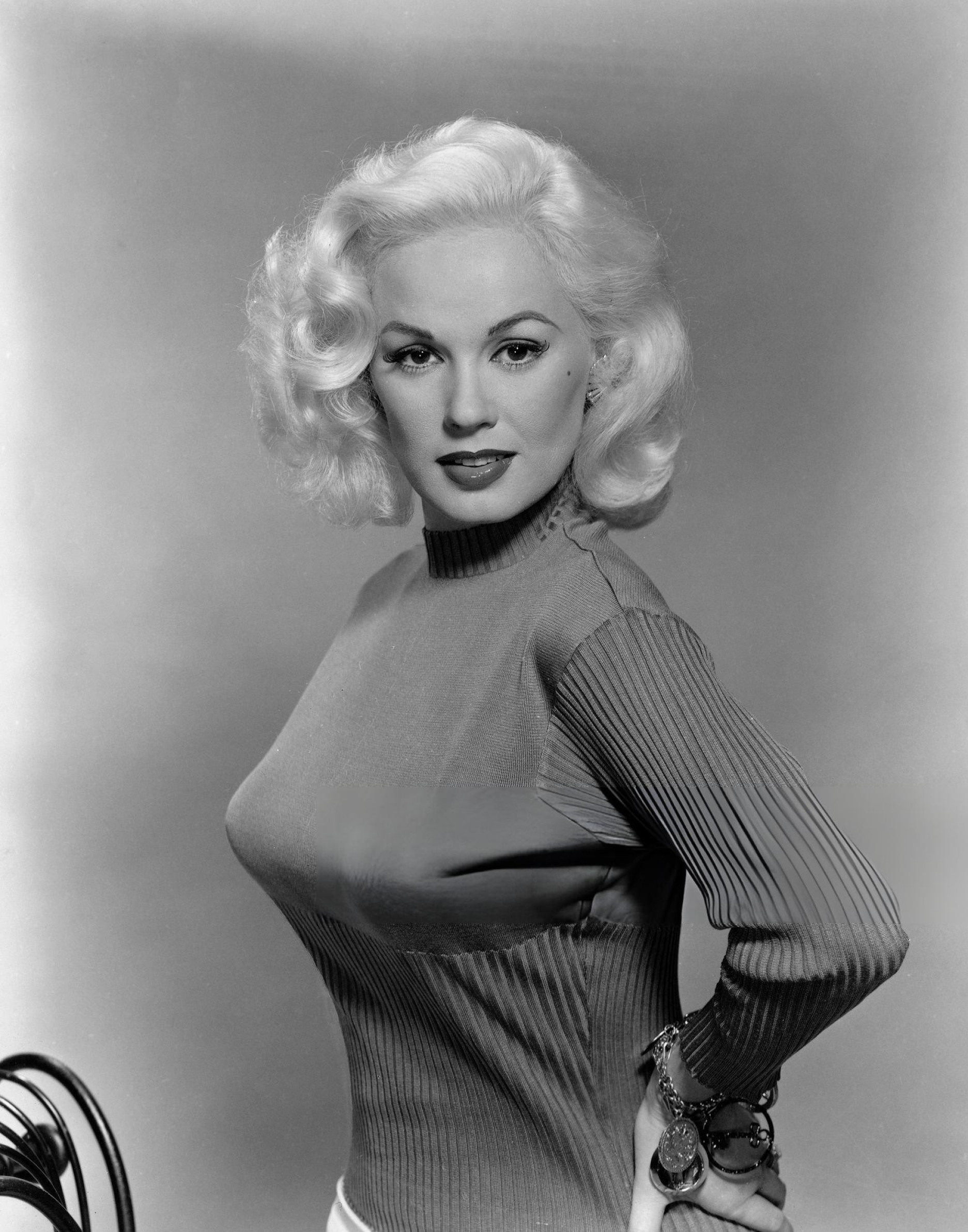
Mamie Van Doren, 1958

The term "sweater girl" was made popular in the 1940s and 1950s to describe Hollywood actresses like Lana Turner, Jayne Mansfield, and Jane Russell, who adopted the popular fashion of wearing tight, form-fitting sweaters that emphasized the woman's bustline. The sweater girl trend was not confined to Hollywood and was viewed with alarm by some. In 1949 a Pittsburgh police superintendent even singled out the sweater girl as a symptom of the moral decline of postwar youth:

"Women walk the streets, their curves accentuated by their dresses," Superintendent of Police Harvey J. Scott said. "But our real problem is with bobby soxers. They are the sweater girls—just kids showing off their curves and apparently liking it. What kind of mothers and wives are they going to be?"

== Fashion influence ==
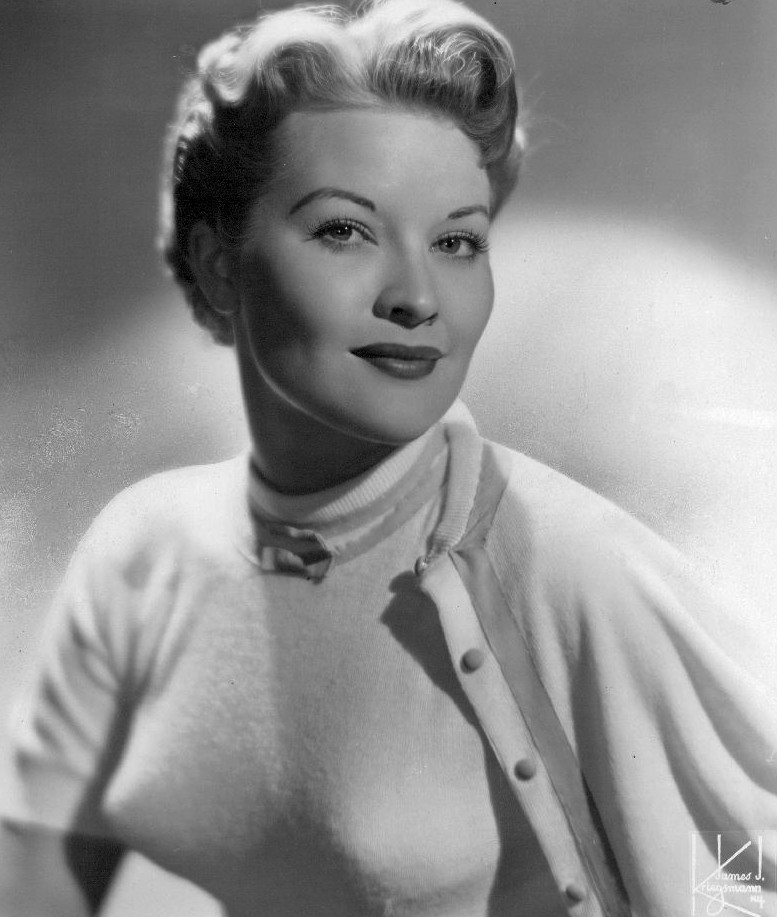
Patti Page, 1955.

New, soft fabrics like cashmere and angora were being used to make sweaters. The conical shape bra, sometimes called a bullet bra, raises and separates the breasts. In its original form, the look was often tied to the promotion of new bra technology.

Interest in the bullet bra revived after Madonna wore a cone bra during her 1990 Blond Ambition World Tour. The bra was designed by Jean Paul Gaultier who was inspired by the vintage Perma-Lift bullet bra of the 1940s. By that time, the style was regarded as erotic and provocative. The bullet bra has also become popular with burlesque and rockabilly enthusiasts, both of which draw inspiration from the 1950s.

== Popular culture ==
Lana Turner's appearance in the 1937 film They Won't Forget in a tight-fitting knit top is sometimes considered the first case of the "sweater girl", as Hollywood publicists sought for a catchy phrase to describe the impact she made on the screen. Movie magazines nicknamed her "The Sweater Girl," just as Ann Sheridan was "The Oomph Girl," Dorothy Lamour "The Sarong Girl," and Clara Bow "The It girl."

Sweater Girl is the name of a 1942 film written by Robert Blees and Beulah Marie Dix, directed by William Clemens and starring Eddie Bracken, June Preisser, Phillip Terry, and Betty Jane Rhodes.

From the 1944 Army–Navy Screen Magazine No. 20, a one-reel short that showed portions of a special Armed Forces Radio Network recording session, Bob Hope introduces "sweater girl" Judy Garland. Before she sings "Over the Rainbow", they perform a short comic sketch, Garland asking why men are so crazy about sweater girls. Hope says he does not know and wisecracks, "That's one mystery I'd like to unravel".

In September 1968 an obscure clerical worker named Francine Gottfried briefly attained international celebrity as "Wall Street's Sweater Girl" as large crowds of gawking men and newspaper reporters awaited her arrival at the Wall Street subway stop each morning and mobbed her on her way to work.

== See also ==
- Breast fetishism
- Pin-up model
