= List of performances and awards of Lana Turner =

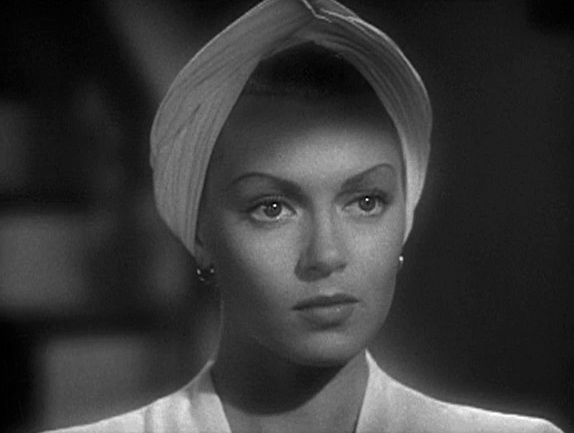
Turner as Cora Smith in The Postman Always Rings Twice (1946)

Lana Turner (1921–1995) was an American actress who appeared in over fifty films during her career, which spanned four decades. Discovered in 1937 at age 16, she signed a contract with Warner Bros. but soon transferred to Metro-Goldwyn-Mayer. The studio's co-founder, Louis B. Mayer, helped further her career by casting her in several youth-oriented comedies and musicals, including Dancing Co-Ed (1939) and Ziegfeld Girl (1941), the latter of which was a commercial success and helped establish her as one of the studio's leading performers. Turner subsequently co-starred with Clark Gable in the drama Somewhere I'll Find You (1943), the first of four films she would appear in with him.

Turner's role as a femme fatale in the film noir The Postman Always Rings Twice (1946) advanced her career significantly and established her as a dramatic actress. It earned her acclaim with Bosley Crowther of The New York Times deeming it "the role of her career." In addition to her film roles, Turner frequently appeared on radio programs throughout the 1940s, including Suspense and The Orson Welles Almanac. In 1952, she co-starred in the drama The Bad and the Beautiful (1952) opposite Kirk Douglas, portraying an alcoholic actress. Turner made her final film appearance with Gable in the drama Betrayed (1954). After the critical and commercial failure of Diane (1956), MGM opted not to renew Turner's contract. At the time, her films with the studio had collectively earned over $50 million

In 1957, she took a leading role portraying Constance MacKenzie in 20th Century Fox's Peyton Place, a film adaptation of the Grace Metalious novel of the same name. The film was a major box office success, and Turner earned her first and only Academy Award nomination for Best Actress for her performance. In 1959, she accepted the lead role in Douglas Sirk's remake of Imitation of Life, a drama for Universal Pictures in which she portrayed a struggling stage actress, which was another commercial success at the box office. Turner's final leading role was in 1966's Madame X, for which she earned a David di Donatello award for Best Actress. She spent the majority of the 1970s in semiretirement, appearing in touring stage plays, such as Forty Carats and Bell, Book and Candle. In 1982, she was cast in a recurring guest role on the television soap opera Falcon Crest. She made her final film appearance in the comedy horror film Witches' Brew in 1980.

== Film ==
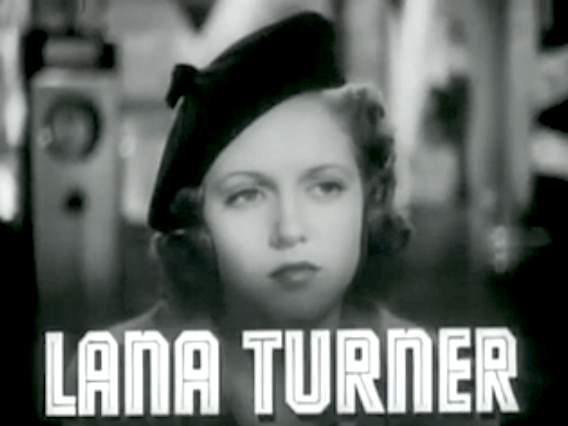
In They Won't Forget (1937)

Year	Title	Role(s)	Director(s)	Studio	Ref.
1937	They Won't Forget	Mary Clay	Mervyn LeRoy	Warner Bros.	
1937	Topper	Nightclub Patron (Note: Uncredited role)	Norman Z. MacLeod	Metro-Goldwyn-Mayer	
1937	The Great Garrick	Mademoiselle Auber	James Whale	Warner Bros.	
1938	The Adventures of Marco Polo	Nazama's Maid	Archie Mayo; John Ford	United Artists	
1938	Love Finds Andy Hardy	Cynthia Potter	George B. Seitz	Metro-Goldwyn-Mayer	
1938	The Chaser	Miss Rutherford (Note: Scenes deleted)	Edwin L. Marin	Metro-Goldwyn-Mayer	
1938	Four's a Crowd	Passerby (Note: Uncredited role)	Michael Curtiz	Warner Bros.	
1938	Rich Man, Poor Girl	Helen Thayer	Reinhold Schünzel	Metro-Goldwyn-Mayer	
1938	Dramatic School	Mado	Robert B. Sinclair	Metro-Goldwyn-Mayer	
1939	Calling Dr. Kildare	Rosalie Jewett	Harold S. Bucquet	Metro-Goldwyn-Mayer	
1939	These Glamour Girls	Jane Thomas	S. Sylvan Simon	Metro-Goldwyn-Mayer	
1939	Dancing Co-Ed	Patty Marlow	S. Sylvan Simon	Metro-Goldwyn-Mayer	
1940	Two Girls on Broadway	Patricia 'Pat' Mahoney	S. Sylvan Simon	Metro-Goldwyn-Mayer	
1940	We Who Are Young	Marjorie White Brooks	Harold S. Bucquet	Metro-Goldwyn-Mayer	
1941	Ziegfeld Girl	Sheila Regan	Robert Z. Leonard	Metro-Goldwyn-Mayer	
1941	Dr. Jekyll and Mr. Hyde	Bea Emery	Victor Fleming	Metro-Goldwyn-Mayer	
1941	Honky Tonk	Elizabeth Cotton	Jack Conway	Metro-Goldwyn-Mayer	
1942	Johnny Eager	Lisbeth Bard	Mervyn LeRoy	Metro-Goldwyn-Mayer	
1942	Somewhere I'll Find You	Paula Lane	Wesley Ruggles	Metro-Goldwyn-Mayer	
1943	The Youngest Profession	Herself (Note: Cameo role)	Edward Buzzell	Metro-Goldwyn-Mayer	
1943	Slightly Dangerous	Peggy Evans /Carol Burden (Note: In this film, she plays a character known by different names.)	Wesley Ruggles; Buster Keaton (uncredited)	Metro-Goldwyn-Mayer	
1943	Du Barry Was a Lady	Herself (Note: Uncredited role)	Roy Del Ruth	Metro-Goldwyn-Mayer	
1944	Marriage Is a Private Affair	Theo Scofield West	Robert Z. Leonard	Metro-Goldwyn-Mayer	
1945	Keep Your Powder Dry	Valerie 'Val' Parks	Edward Buzzell	Metro-Goldwyn-Mayer	
1945	Week-End at the Waldorf	Bunny Smith	Robert Z. Leonard	Metro-Goldwyn-Mayer	
1946	The Postman Always Rings Twice	Cora Smith	Tay Garnett	Metro-Goldwyn-Mayer	
1947	Green Dolphin Street	Marianne Patourel	Victor Saville	Metro-Goldwyn-Mayer	
1947	Cass Timberlane	Virginia Marshland	George Sidney	Metro-Goldwyn-Mayer	
1948	Homecoming	Lt. Jane 'Snapshot' McCall	Mervyn LeRoy	Metro-Goldwyn-Mayer	
1948	The Three Musketeers	Milady de Winter	George Sidney	Metro-Goldwyn-Mayer	
1950	A Life of Her Own	Lily Brannel James	George Cukor	Metro-Goldwyn-Mayer	
1951	Mr. Imperium	Fredda Barlo	Don Hartman	Metro-Goldwyn-Mayer	
1952	The Merry Widow	Crystal Radek	Curtis Bernhardt	Metro-Goldwyn-Mayer	
1952	The Bad and the Beautiful	Georgia Lorrison	Vincente Minnelli	Metro-Goldwyn-Mayer	
1953	Latin Lovers	Nora Taylor	Mervyn LeRoy	Metro-Goldwyn-Mayer	
1954	Flame and the Flesh	Madeline	Richard Brooks	Metro-Goldwyn-Mayer	
1954	Betrayed	Carla Van Oven	Gottfried Reinhardt	Metro-Goldwyn-Mayer	
1955	The Prodigal	Samarra	Richard Thorpe	Metro-Goldwyn-Mayer	
1955	The Sea Chase	Elsa Keller	John Farrow	Warner Bros.	
1955	The Rains of Ranchipur	Lady Edwina Esketh	Jean Negulesco	20th Century Fox	
1956	Diane	Diane de Poitiers	David Miller	Metro-Goldwyn-Mayer	
1957	Peyton Place	Constance MacKenzie	Mark Robson	20th Century Fox	
1958	The Lady Takes a Flyer	Maggie Colby	Jack Arnold	Universal Pictures	
1958	Another Time, Another Place	Sara Scott	Lewis Allen	Paramount Pictures	
1959	Imitation of Life	Lora Meredith	Douglas Sirk	Universal Pictures	
1960	Portrait in Black	Sheila Cabot	Michael Gordon	Universal Pictures	
1961	By Love Possessed	Marjorie Penrose	John Sturges	United Artists	
1961	Bachelor in Paradise	Rosemary Howard	Jack Arnold	Metro-Goldwyn-Mayer	
1962	Who's Got the Action?	Melanie Flood	Daniel Mann	Paramount Pictures	
1965	Love Has Many Faces	Kit Jordan	Alexander Singer	Columbia Pictures	
1966	Madame X	Holly Parker	David Lowell Rich	Universal Pictures	
1969	The Big Cube	Adriana Roman	Tito Davison	Warner Bros.	
1974	Persecution	Carrie Masters	Don Chaffey	Fanfare Films	
1976	Bittersweet Love	Claire	David Miller	AVCO Embassy	
1980	Witches' Brew	Vivian Cross	Herbert L. Strock; Richard Schorr	United Artists	
1994	That's Entertainment! III	Herself	Bud Friedgen; Michael J. Sheridan	Metro-Goldwyn-Mayer	

=== Unrealized projects ===
Year	Title	Role(s)	Notes	Ref.
1940	Our Dancing Daughters	Unknown	Remake of 1928 film; never made	
1940	The Uniform	Unknown	Set to star opposite Clark Gable; Turner was replaced with Rosalind Russell, and the film was released as They Met in Bombay	
1947	Bedeviled	Unknown	Unfinished; Turner dropped out to appear in The Three Musketeers	
1949	Samson and Delilah	Delilah	Role went to Hedy Lamarr	
1959	Streets of Montmartre	Suzanne Valadon	Set to star with Louis Jourdan; never made	

== Television ==
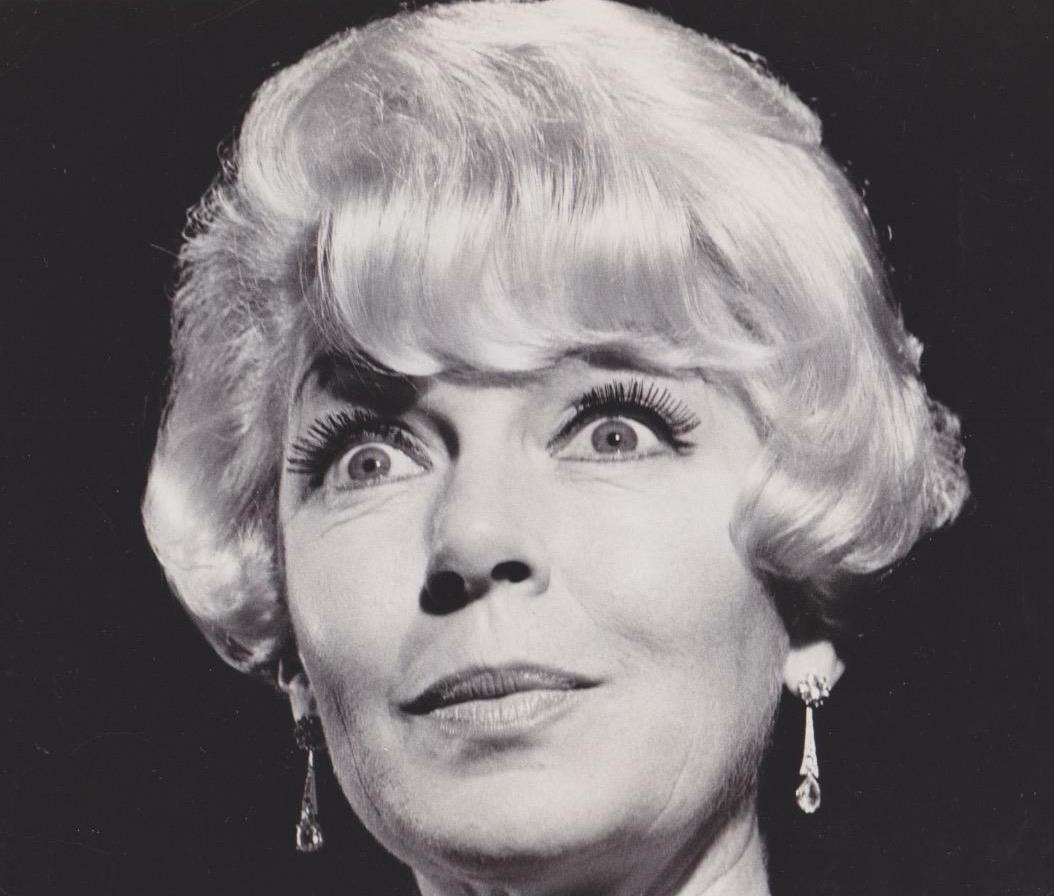
On The Smothers Brothers Comedy Hour, 1967

Year	Title	Role(s)	Notes	Ref.
1967	The Smothers Brothers Comedy Hour	Herself	Episode: "1.10"	
1967	The Carol Burnett Show	Herself	Episode: "1.16"	
1969–70	Harold Robbins' The Survivors	Tracy Carlyle Hastings	15 episodes	
1971	The Last of the Powerseekers	Tracy Carlyle Hastings	Television film	
1982–83	Falcon Crest	Jacqueline Perrault	6 episodes	
1985	The Love Boat	Elizabeth Raleigh	Episode: "Caribbean Cruise: Call Me Grandma/A Gentleman of Discretion/The Perfect Divorce/Letting Go"	

== Radio ==
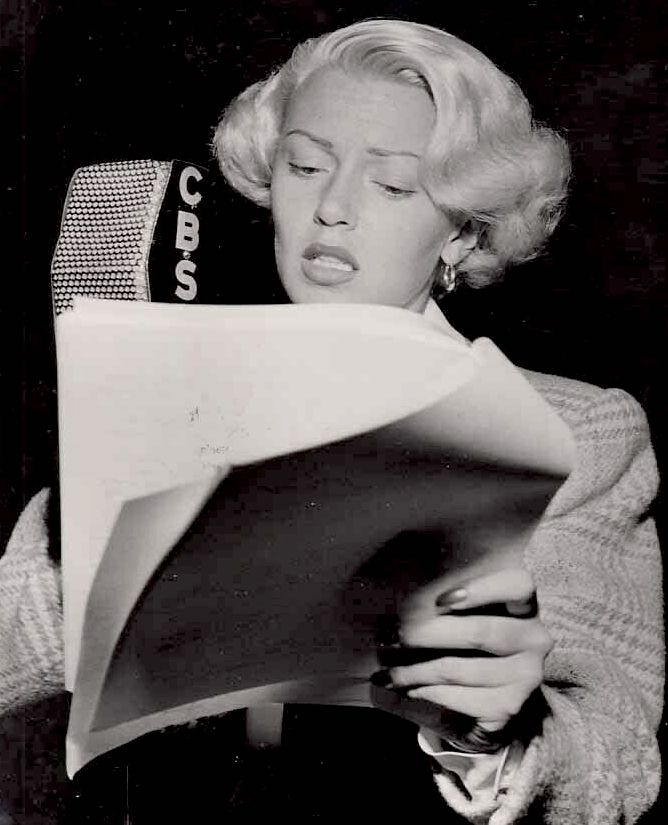
Performing on the Suspense radio show, 1945

Air date	Program	Episode	Role(s)	Notes	Ref.
June 2, 1941	Lux Radio Theatre	They Drive by Night	Lana Carlsen	Guest-starring with Lucille Ball	
January 19, 1942	Philip Morris Playhouse	The Devil and Miss Jones	Mary Jones	Co-starring with Lionel Barrymore	
July 5, 1944	The Orson Welles Almanac	The Mercury Wonder Show	Herself	Guest-starring with Susan Hayward	
June 19, 1944	The Orson Welles Almanac	Fifth War Loan Drive			
May 3, 1945	Suspense	Fear Paints a Picture	Julia		
April 11, 1946	Lux Radio Theatre	Honky Tonk	Elizabeth Cotton	Co-starring with John Hodiak	
June 17, 1946	Screen Guild Theater	Marriage Is a Private Affair	Theo Scofield West	Co-starring with John Hodiak	
August 14, 1946	Academy Award Theater	Vivacious Lady	Francey		
April 13, 1948	The Bob Hope Show		Herself	Skit performed with Bob Hope	
September 19, 1949	Lux Radio Theatre	Green Dolphin Street	Marianne Patourel		
December 15, 1949	Suspense	The Flame Blue Glove	Shadow		

== Stage ==
Year(s)	Title	Role(s)	Notes	Ref.
1971	Forty Carats	Ann Stanley	Touring performance	
1975	The Pleasure of His Company	Jessica Anne Poole	Single performance; Arlington Park Theater, Chicago	
1978	Divorce Me, Darling	Amelia Conway	Performances at Drury Lane Theatre, Chicago	
1976–78	Bell, Book and Candle	Gillian Holroyd	Touring performance; co-starring with Patrick Horgan	
1980–82	Murder Among Friends	Angela Forrester	Touring performance	

== Awards and nominations ==
Award	Category	Year	Nominated work(s)	Outcome	Ref.
Academy Awards	Best Actress in a Leading Role	1958	Peyton Place	Nominated	
David di Donatello	Best Foreign Actress	1966	Madame X	Won	
Donostia Awards	Lifetime Achievement	1994	–	Won	
Laurel Awards	Top Female Dramatic Performance	1958	Peyton Place	4th place	
Laurel Awards	Top Female Star	1959	–	9th place	
Laurel Awards	Top Female Star	1960	–	13th place	
Laurel Awards	Top Female Star	1961	–	9th place	
Laurel Awards	Best Actress	1966	Madame X	5th place	
Medalla Sitges	Best Actress	1975	Persecution	Won	

== Sources ==
- Barton, Ruth (2010). Hedy Lamarr: The Most Beautiful Woman in Film. University Press of Kentucky. ISBN 978-0-813-12604-3.
- Basinger, Jeanine (1976). Lana Turner. Pyramid Publications. ISBN 978-0-515-04194-1.
- Billips, Connie J.; Pierce, Arthur (1995). Lux Presents Hollywood: A Show-by-Show History of the Lux Radio Theatre and the Lux Video Theatre, 1934–1957. Jefferson, North Carolina: McFarland. ISBN 978-0-899-50938-9.
- Clements, Cynthia; Weber, Sandra (1996). George Burns and Gracie Allen: A Bio-Bibliography. Vol. 72. New York: Greenwood Press. ISBN 978-0-313-26883-0.
- Fischer, Lucy (ed). (1991). Imitation of Life. New Brunswick, New Jersey: Rutgers University Press. ISBN 0-8135-1644-7.
- Grams, Martin (2000). Radio Drama: A Comprehensive Chronicle of American Network Programs, 1932–1962. Jefferson, North Carolina: McFarland. ISBN 978-0-786-40051-5.
- Greene, Heather (2018). Bell, Book and Camera: A Critical History of Witches in American Film and Television. Jefferson, North Carolina: McFarland. ISBN 978-1-476-63206-3.
- Heyer, Paul (2005). The Medium and the Magician: Orson Welles, the Radio Years, 1934–1952. Lanham, Maryland: Rowman and Littlefield. ISBN 978-0-742-53797-2.
- Jordan, Jessica Hope (2009). The Sex Goddess in American Film, 1930–1965: Jean Harlow, Mae West, Lana Turner, and Jayne Mansfield. Cambria Press. ISBN 978-1-60497-663-2.
- Kashner, Sam; MacNair, Jennifer (2002). The Bad & the Beautiful: Hollywood in the Fifties. New York: W.W. Norton & Company. ISBN 978-0-393-32436-5.
- Langer, Carole (dir.) (2001). Lana Turner ... a Daughter's Memoir. Turner Classic Movies. Archived from the original (Documentary) on November 6, 2018.
- McKay, James (2012). The Films of Victor Mature. Jefferson, North Carolina: McFarland. ISBN 978-0-786-44970-5.
- Morella, Joe; Epstein, Edward Z. (1971). Lana: The Public and Private Lives of Miss Turner. New York: Citadel Press. ISBN 0-8065-0226-6.
- O'Neil, Thomas (2003). Movie Awards: The Ultimate, Unofficial Guide to the Oscars, Golden Globes, Critics, Guild & Indie Honors. New York: Perigee Book. ISBN 978-0-399-52922-1.
- Parish, James Robert (1978). The Hollywood Beauties. New York: Arlington House. ISBN 978-0-87000-412-4.
- Pitts, Michael R. (2015). RKO Radio Pictures Horror, Science Fiction and Fantasy Films, 1929–1956. Jefferson, North Carolina: McFarland. ISBN 978-1-476-61683-4.
- Shearer, Stephen Michael (2010). Beautiful: The Life of Hedy Lamarr. New York: Macmillan. ISBN 978-1-429-90820-7.
- Valentino, Lou (1976). The Films of Lana Turner. Seacaucus, New Jersey: Citadel Press. ISBN 978-0-8065-0553-4.
- Wayne, Jane Ellen (2003). The Golden Girls of MGM: Greta Garbo, Joan Crawford, Lana Turner, Judy Garland, Ava Gardner, Grace Kelly and Others. New York: Carroll & Graf Publishers. ISBN 0-7867-1303-8.
