= Onlywomen Press =

London-based radical feminist lesbian publishers

- Status: Defunct
- Founded: 1974; 52 years ago
- Founders: Lilian Mohin, Sheila Shulman, and Deborah Hart
- Defunct: 2010; 16 years ago
- Country of origin: England
- Headquarters location: London
- Distribution: International
- Publication types: Books, pamphlets
- Nonfiction topics: Lesbian feminism and feminist literary criticism
- Fiction genres: Feminist science fiction, lesbian literature, feminist poetry
- Official website: www.onlywomenpress.com

Onlywomen Press (briefly known as The Women's Press) was a feminist press based in London. It was the only feminist press to be founded by out lesbians, Lilian Mohin, Sheila Shulman, and Deborah Hart. It commenced publishing in 1974 and was one of five notably active feminist publishers in the 1990s.

Onlywomen was unique from other British feminist presses because it both printed and published material. This allowed them to control all parts of the "chain of cultural production" and to "subsidize publishing activity" by printing books.

Between 1986 and 1988 it published the journal Gossip: A Journal of Lesbian Feminist Ethics.

Writers published in the press often read their work at Gay's the Word bookshop.

A number of noted lesbian writers published by Onlywomen Press include Anna Livia, Margaret Sloan-Hunter, Jay Taverner, Celia Kitzinger and Sue Wilkinson, Sylvia Martin and Sheila Jeffreys.

Its last book, a children's book, was published in 2010.

== Works published ==
=== Fiction ===
- Croft, Eve (1981). Brainchild. Onlywomen Press. ISBN 978-0-906500-06-4
- Livia, Anna (1988). Bulldozer Rising. Onlywomen Press. ISBN 9780906500279.
- Forbes, Caroline (1985). The Needle on Full: Lesbian Feminist Science Fiction. Onlywomen Press. ISBN 978-0906500194.
- Klepfisz, Irena (1985). Different Enclosures: The Poetry and Prose of Irena Klepfisz. Onlywomen Press. ISBN 9780906500170.
- Livia, Anna (1986). Incidents Involving Warmth: A Collection of Lesbian Feminist Love Stories.
- Dorcey, Mary (1989). A Noise from the Woodshed. ISBN 9780906500309.
- Livia, Anna; Mohin, Lilian (1989). The Pied Piper: Lesbian Feminist Fiction. Onlywomen. ISBN 9780906500293.
- Duncker, Patricia, ed. (1990). In and Out of Time: Lesbian Feminist Fiction. Onlywomen Press. ISBN 9780906500378.
- Natzler, Caroline (1990). Water Wings. Onlywomen Press. ISBN 9780906500385.
- Edwards, Nicky (1990). Stealing Time. Onlywomen. ISBN 9780906500316.
- Arrowsmith, Pat (1998). Many Are Called. Onlywomen. ISBN 978-0906500590.
- Dykewomon, Elana (2000). Beyond the Pale: A Novel. Onlywomen. ISBN 9780906500637.

==== Poetry ====
- Mohin, Lilian, ed. (1979). One Foot on the Mountain: An Anthology of British Feminist Poetry, 1969-1979. Onlywomen Press Limited. ISBN 978-0906500019.
- Carthew, Natasha (1999) Flash Reckless ISBN 9780906500705.
- Dorcey, Mary (1982). Kindling. Onlywomen Press. ISBN 9780906500095. 978-0906500705
- Grahn, Judy (1985). The Work of a Common Woman. Only women. ISBN 9780906500200.
- Mohin, Lilian (1987). Beautiful Barbarians: Lesbian Feminist Poetry. Onlywomen. ISBN 9780906500231.
- Namjoshi, Suniti (1989). Because of India: Selected Poems and Fables. Onlywomen Press. ISBN 9780906500330.
- Hacker, Marilyn (1990). The Hang-glider's Daughter: New and Selected Poems. Onlywomen Press. ISBN 9780906500361.
- Foley, Kate (1994). Soft Engineering. Onlywomen Press. ISBN 9780906500514.
- Kendall, Tina (1995). Lightning On My Tongue. Onlywomen Press. ISBN 978-0906500507.
- Dykewomon, Elana (1995). Nothing will be as sweet as the taste. Onlywomen Press. ISBN 0906500575.
- Mohin, Lilian, ed. (1999). Not for the Academy: Lesbian Poets. Onlywomen Press. ISBN 9780906500606.

=== Nonfiction ===
- Rhodes, Dusty; McNeill, Sandra, eds. (1985). Women Against Violence Against Women. Onlywomen Press. ISBN 0906500168.
- Lucia Hoagland, Sarah; Penelope, Julia, eds. (1988). For Lesbians Only: A Separatist Anthology. Onlywomen. ISBN 9780906500286.
- Jay, Karla; Glasgow, Joanne, eds. (1992). Lesbian Texts and Contexts: Radical Revisions.
- Kitzinger, Celia; Perkins, Rachel (1993). Changing Our Minds: Lesbian Feminism and Psychology. NYU Press. ISBN 9780814746455.
- Raitt, Suzanne, ed. (1995). Volcanoes and Pearl Divers: Essays in Lesbian Feminist Studies. Onlywomen Press. ISBN 0906500486.
- Menasche, Ann (1997). Leaving the Life: Lesbians, Ex-Lesbians and the Heterosexual Imperative. Onlywomen. ISBN 978-0906500538.
- Martin, Sylvia (2001). Passionate Friends: Mary Fullerton, Mabel Singleton & Miles Franklin. Onlywomen Press. ISBN 9780906500644.

==== Papers ====
- Rich, Adrienne (1981). Compulsory heterosexuality and lesbian existence. ISBN 0906500079.
- Leeds Revolutionary Feminist Group (1981). Love Your Enemy?: The Debate Between Heterosexual Feminism and Political Lesbianism. Onlywomen Press. ISBN 0906500087.
