= Assembly of Lesbians of Álava =

- Asamblea de Lesbianas de Álava
- Formation: 1994
- Type: Voluntary association
- Legal status: Voluntary association
- Headquarters: Vitoria-Gasteiz
- Coordinates: 42°51′N 2°41′W

The Assembly of Lesbians of Álava - Arabako Lesbianen Asanblada, (Spanish: Asamblea de Lesbianas de Álava) also known as ALA-ALA by its acronym in Spanish and Basque, was the first association of lesbian women in Álava.

== History ==
Assembly of Lesbians of Álava was founded in 1994 in Vitoria-Gasteiz with the objective, according to its statutes, of promoting socio-cultural activities related to lesbian women. This assembly joined the collective of feminist lesbians Euskadi emerged in the Basque capitals and Navarra throughout the 90s, but disappeared between 2000 and 2001.

ALA-ALA carried out a first meeting in 1994, attended by more than 400 people from all over the region. In this meeting, workshops on politics were held in which an attempt was made to incorporate the feminist perspective. In addition, ludic activities such as laughter therapy took place, thus placing humor in a central position and understood as a tool through which to channel complaints.

The starting point of the organization's first debates and reflections was the work The lesbian heresy (Spanish: La herejía lesbiana), by lesbian feminist theorist Sheila Jeffreys, which starts from the thesis that the struggle of lesbians are more related to the oppression of women than to the vindication of homosexual men. Subsequently, they drew on publications from different geographical parts, including the Madrid collective LSD (Lesbianas Sin Dudas).

During the active life of the organization, its members participated in the protests on June 28 to mark the International LGBT Pride Day in Álava.
