= Lilian Mohin =

Lesbian feminist activist and publisher (1938–2020)

Lilian Mohin (2 September 1938 – 19 February 2020) was a radical feminist, activist, poet, pioneer of feminist publishing, and co-founder of Onlywomen Press, a London-based publishing house primarily publishing feminist work. She remained the director of the company until 2015. She was a published author and activist who appeared on the cover of Life magazine with Ralph Nader.

== Early life ==
She was born Lilian Rodgers in Sevenoaks to Karl Rotter, a silverware designer, and Hilda (née Rosenrauch). Her Jewish parents had lived in Vienna but were forced to flee in 1938 to avoid persecution from Nazis. When they moved from Vienna to Sevenoaks they changed their surname to Rodgers. When Lilian was still an infant, her parents moved to the United States, where she attended Taunton High School. While still in high school, she met her future husband, William Mohin, who was a cadet at the nearby US Coast Guard Academy. They eventually got married in 1957, and Lilian was just 18 years old. Over the next three years she had two children, Andrea and Timothy.

== Career ==
Due to William's work, the Mohin family regularly moved. At each location, Lillian was an inner-city school teacher that would be a part of the fair housing movement locally. She was also a “Nader’s Raiders” for Ralph Nader, who was the head of a group fighting for equal rights in the US. In 1970, they moved their family to the UK . They eventually got divorced in 1973 and she came out as lesbian, effectively breaking the family up.

After coming out, Mohin made her sexuality into her cause. In 1974, Mohin, Sheila Shulman and Deborah Hart attended a two-year printing course at Camberwell College of Arts in order to acquire the training needed to run a publishing company. At the time, they were the first full-time female students. In 1976, Mohin went on to study binding and paper production at the London College of Printing. She then spent a year working as the only woman working in a commercial print shop. In 1978, Mohin, Shulman, Hart, and Jacky Bishop (who joined the group in 1975) opened Onlywomen Press ("OWP"). Mohin began managing OWP's grants process full-time and worked as the managing director. Throughout the ups and downs of OWP, Mohin kept her belief that women's words would "change the world."

Mohin was also involved in the broader field of feminist publishing and women in publishing. Mohin and her OWP colleagues taught other women about the production process. In 1977, she and Hart organized the first national conference for women in publishing and printing. This aligned with Mohin's belief that lesbianism was based on community.

In 2015, illness forced her to step down from Only Women Press, and she was moved to Nightingale care home in Clapham to live her last few years.

== Works ==
- Cracks: poems 1974-75. London: Onlywomen Press, 1975.
- (ed.) One foot on the mountain : an anthology of British feminist poetry, 1969-1979. [London]: Onlywomen Press Ltd., 1979.
- (with Anna Wilson) Past participants : a lesbian history diary for 1984. London: Onlywomen Press, 1983.
- (ed. with Sheila Shulman) The Reach and other stories: lesbian feminist fiction. London: Onlywomen Press, 1984.
- (ed.) Beautiful barbarians : lesbian feminist poetry. London: Onlywomen, 1986.
- (ed.) The Pied Piper: lesbian feminist fiction. London: Onlywomen, 1989.
- (ed.) An intimacy of equals: lesbian feminist ethics. New York: Harrington Park Press, 1996.
- (ed.) Not for the academy : lesbian poets. London: Onlywomen Press, 1999.
