= Ti-Grace Atkinson =

American radical feminist activist (born 1938)

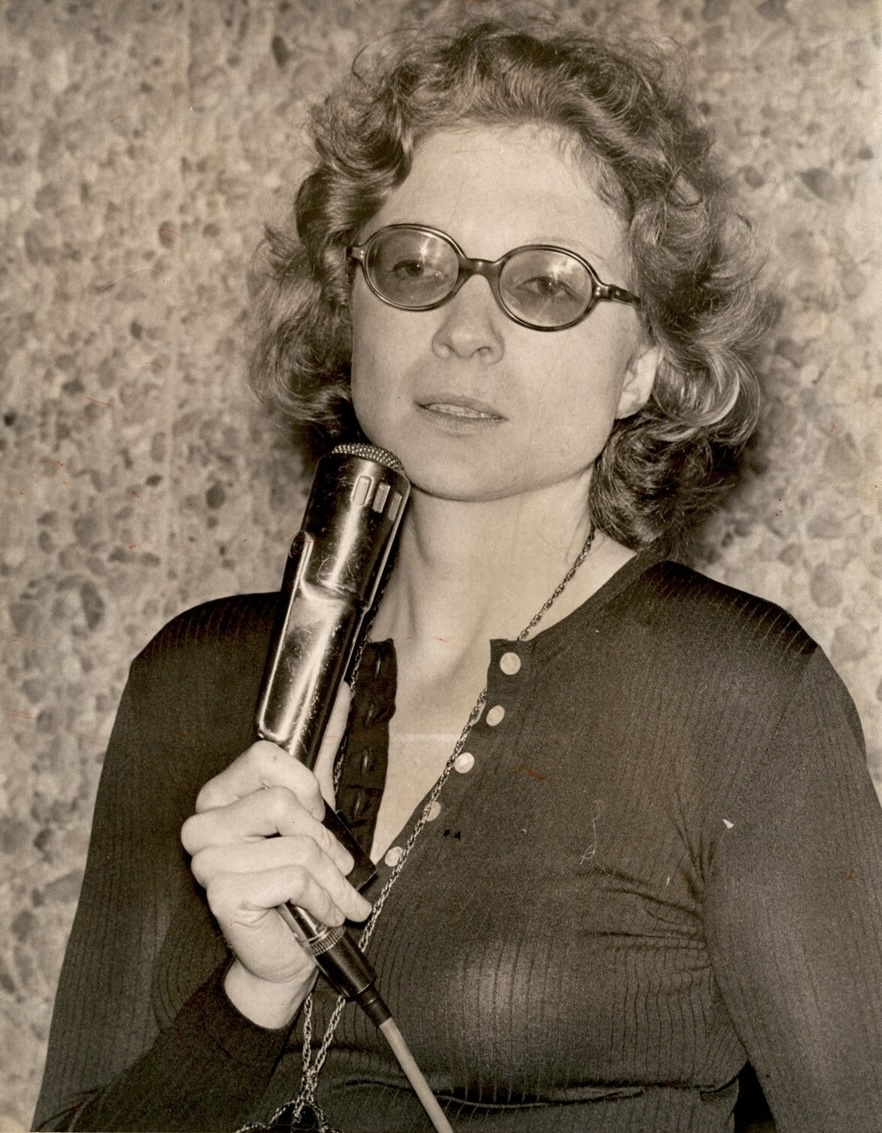
- Atkinson in 1970
- Born: Grace Atkinson; November 9, 1938 (age 88); Baton Rouge, Louisiana, U.S.
- Education: Pennsylvania Academy of the Fine Arts (BFA); Columbia University (MA)
- Occupations: Activist; writer; philosopher
- Years active: 1968–1974
- Organization: The Feminists (1968–1971)
- Movement: Radical feminism
- Spouse: Charles Leeds Sharpless (m. 1956; div. 1962)

Grace Atkinson (born November 9, 1938), better known as Ti-Grace Atkinson, is an American radical feminist activist, writer and philosopher. She was an early member of the National Organization for Women (NOW) and presided over the New York chapter in 1967–68, though she quickly grew disillusioned with the group. She left to form The Feminists, which she left a few years later due to internal disputes. Atkinson was a member of the Daughters of Bilitis and an advocate for political lesbianism. Atkinson has been largely inactive since the 1970s, but resurfaced in 2013 to co-author an open statement expressing radical feminists' concerns about what they perceived as the silencing of discussion around "the currently fashionable concept of gender."

== Early life and education ==
Atkinson was born on November 9, 1938 in Baton Rouge, Louisiana, into a prominent Cajun Republican family. Her father, Francis Decker Atkinson, was a chemical engineer for Standard Oil, and her mother, Thelma Atkinson, was a homemaker. Named after her grandmother, Grace, the "Ti" is Cajun French for petite, meaning "little". She traveled extensively in her childhood, and attended multiple schools in Europe and the United States. Atkinson married her high school boyfriend, Air Force captain Charles Leeds Sharpless, whom she divorced around 1961 or 1962.

Atkinson earned her Bachelor of Fine Arts (BFA) from the Pennsylvania Academy of the Fine Arts in 1964. While still in Philadelphia, she helped found the Institute of Contemporary Art, acting as its first director. Atkinson was also a sculpture critic for the periodical ARTnews, as well as a painter, and associated with artists such as Elaine de Kooning. In 1969, a photograph of Atkinson was published in a series by Diane Arbus in the London Sunday Times. She later moved to New York City where, in 1967, she entered the PhD program in philosophy at Columbia University, where she studied with the philosopher and art critic Arthur Danto. She received her master's degree in 1990, but did not complete her dissertation.

Atkinson later moved on to study the work of Gottlob Frege with philosopher Charles Parsons. She has lived in Cambridge since 1997 and taught at several colleges and universities over the years, including the Pratt Institute, Case Western Reserve University and Tufts University.

== Feminism ==
As an undergraduate, Atkinson read Simone de Beauvoir's The Second Sex, and struck up a correspondence with Beauvoir, who suggested that she contact Betty Friedan. Atkinson became an early member of the National Organization for Women, which Friedan had co-founded, serving on the national board, and becoming the New York chapter president in 1967. Her time with the organization was tumultuous, including a row with the national leadership over her attempts to defend and promote Valerie Solanas and her SCUM Manifesto in the wake of the Andy Warhol shooting.

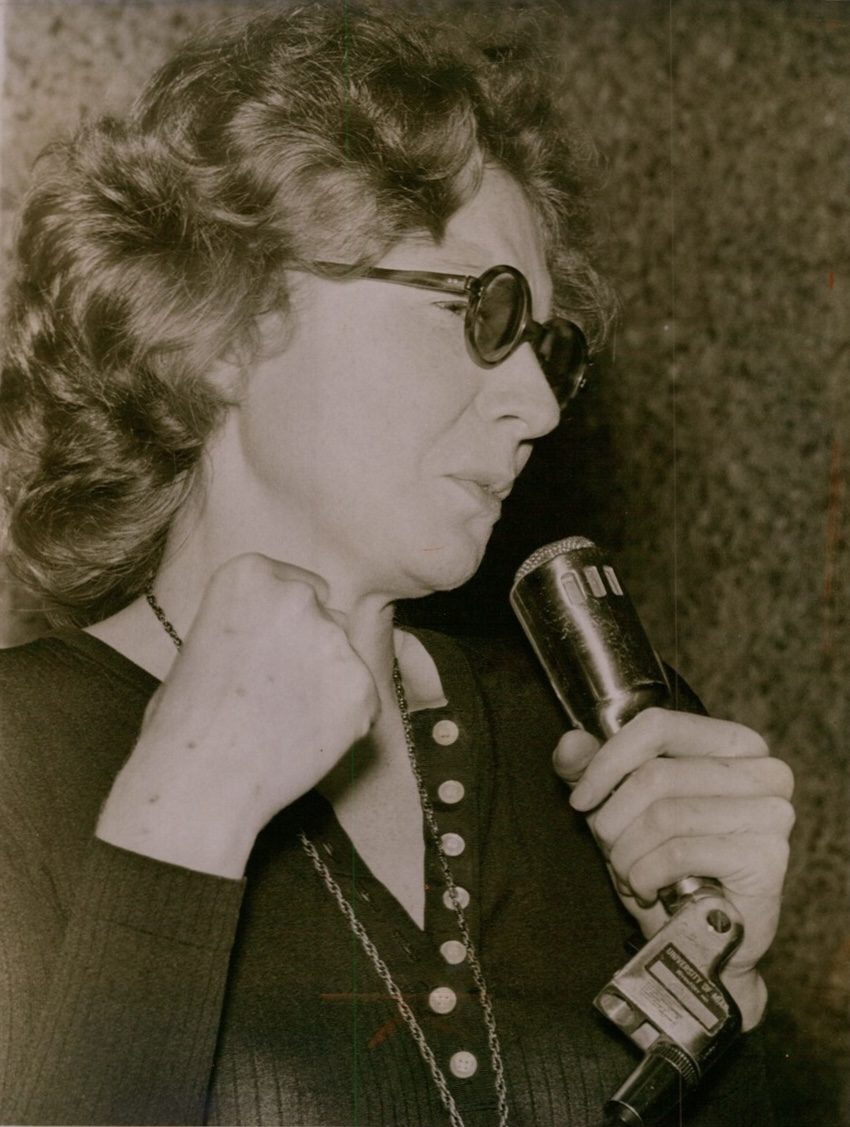
Atkinson giving a lecture at the University of Miami, November 4, 1970

In 1968, she became critical of the organization's inability to confront issues like abortion and marriage inequalities; she also felt it replicated patriarchal power structures, and resigned from her presidency after her proposal to abolish NOW's executive offices was defeated in a vote. She founded the October 17th Movement, named for the date of her resignation, which would later become The Feminists, a radical feminist group active until 1973; however, she left the group in 1971 when the group barred its members from speaking to the press. By then, she had written several pamphlets on feminism, was a member of the Daughters of Bilitis and was advocating specifically political lesbianism. Atkinson led and participated in protests against Richard Nixon, the Manhattan Marriage Bureau, and gender-segregated classified ads in the New York Times. She advocated for more violent means of activism, and publicly admired the Italian-American Unity League and the Weathermen. Her book Amazon Odyssey was published in 1974. Atkinson was involved with Sagaris, an experimental feminist summer school in Lyndonville, Vermont, in the 1970s, but left the organization with several other faculty members after the school accepted a grant from Ms. Magazine.

In 1971, Patricia Buckley Bozell, a Catholic and conservative activist, slapped or attempted to slap (unclear if physical contact was actually made) Atkinson after the latter made what Bozell described as "an illiterate harangue against the mystical body of Christ". The incident occurred on the platform of Catholic University of America's auditorium while Atkinson was discussing the virginity of the Virgin Mary.

"Sisterhood", Atkinson famously said in her 1971 resignation from the Feminists, "is powerful. It kills. Mostly sisters."

In 2013, Atkinson, along with Carol Hanisch, Kathy Scarbrough, and Kathie Sarachild, initiated "Forbidden Discourse: The Silencing of Feminist Criticism of 'Gender'", which they described as an "open statement from 48 radical feminists from seven countries". In August 2014, Michelle Goldberg in The New Yorker described it as expressing their "alarm" at "threats and attacks, some of them physical, on individuals and organizations daring to challenge the currently fashionable concept of gender."

== Bibliography ==
=== Books ===
- Amazon Odyssey (1974)

=== Pamphlets and book chapters ===
- "The Institution of Sexual Intercourse" (pamphlet, 1968, published by The Feminists)
- "Vaginal orgasm as a mass hysterical survival response" (pamphlet, 1968, published by The Feminists)
- "Radical Feminism" (pamphlet, 1969, published by The Feminists)
- "Radical Feminism and Love" (pamphlet, 1969, published by The Feminists)
- Linden, Robin Ruth (1982). "Why I'm against S/M liberation". Against Sadomasochism: A Radical Feminist Analysis. Frog in the Well. pp. 90–92. ISBN 0-9603628-3-5. OCLC 7877113.
