= Feminist (disambiguation) =

A feminist is a person who supports or engages in feminism.

Feminist(s) may also refer to:

- The Feminists, an American feminist group that was active from 1968 to 1973
- Feminist, a story arc in the comic strip Pugad Baboy

== See also ==
- List of feminists
