= Suniti Namjoshi =

Indian writer (born 1941)

Suniti Namjoshi FRSL
- Born: 1941 (age 84–85); Mumbai, India
- Education: University of Missouri (Master's degree); McGill University (PhD)
- Occupations: Poet, author, educator
- Writing career
- Notable work: Feminist Fables

Suniti Namjoshi FRSL (born 1941 in Mumbai, India) is a poet and fabulist. She grew up in India, worked in Canada, and now lives in the southwest of England with English writer Gillian Hanscombe. She has written collections of fables and poetry, novels, and children's books. Her work has been translated into several languages, including Spanish, Italian, Dutch, Chinese, Korean, Hindi, and Turkish.

== Early life ==
Suniti Namjoshi was born in Mumbai in 1941. Her father, Manohar Vinayak Namjoshi, was a senior test pilot at Hindustan Aircraft in Bangalore. He died when his plane crashed in 1953. Her mother, Sarojini Namjoshi, née Naik Nimbalkar, was from Phaltan.

Namjoshi was sent to Woodstock School, an American mission school in the Himalayan foothills, and then to Rishi Valley School in Andhra Pradesh.

== Career ==
She started working as an officer in the Indian Administrative Service in 1964, before pursuing further education. She earned a master's degree in public administration from the University of Missouri and a PhD on Ezra Pound from McGill University.

Namjoshi taught in the Department of English at the University of Toronto from 1972 to 1987. She wrote Feminist Fables in 1981. It has been described as a minor feminist classic and is the work for which Namjoshi is best known. She began writing full-time in 1987, publishing fiction and poetry works. The play Kaliyug - Circles Of Paradise and the poetry collection Flesh And Paper were written in collaboration with Gillian Hanscombe.

Namjoshi has been influenced by Virginia Woolf, Adrienne Rich, Hilary Clare, and Kate Millett. She has been active in the feminist movement and gay liberation movements.

Namjoshi was an Honorary Research Fellow at the Centre for Women's Studies at Exeter University in England from 1995 to 2001, and was a member of the Literary Panel of the Arts Council of England from 1993 to 1996.

In 1996 Namjoshi published Building Babel, a postmodern novel about building cultures, whose story continued online with a collaborative project that enables readers' contributions.

In 2023 Namjoshi was elected a Fellow of the Royal Society of Literature.

Namjoshi lives and writes in Devon, United Kingdom.

== Published works ==
=== Fiction ===
- Feminist Fables. London: Sheba Feminist Press, 1981. ISBN 978-0907179047
- The Conversations of Cow. London: The Women's Press, 1985. ISBN 978-0704328709
- The Blue Donkey Fables. London: The Women's Press, 1988. ISBN 978-0704341159
- The Mothers of Maya Diip. London: The Women's Press, 1989. ISBN 9780704342002
- Because of India: Selected Poems and Fables. London: Onlywomen Press, 1989. ISBN 978-0906500330
- Saint Suniti and the Dragon. North Melbourne: Spinifex Press, 1993. ISBN 978-1875559183
- Building Babel. North Melbourne: Spinifex Press, 1996. ISBN 9781875559565
- Goja: An Autobiographical Myth. North Melbourne: Spinifex Press, 2000. ISBN 9781875559978
- Sycorax: New Fables and Poems. New Delhi: Penguin Books, 2006. ISBN 978-0-14-309984-0
- The Fabulous Feminist: A Suniti Namjoshi Reader. Delhi: Zubaan Books, 2012. ISBN 9789381017333
- Suki. Delhi: Penguin India, 2012. ISBN 9789385932427
- Aesop the Fox. Melbourne: Spinifex Press, 2018. ISBN 9781925581515
- Dangerous Pursuits. Delhi: Zubaan/Penguin, 2022. ISBN 978-93-90514-82-3
- The Good-Hearted Gardeners. Melbourne: Spinifex Press, 2023. ISBN 9781922964007
- O Sister Swallow. Melbourne: Spinifex Press, 2024. ISBN 9781922964083
- Matriarchs, Cows and Epic Villains. Delhi: Zubaan/Penguin Random House, 2025. ISBN 9788194253396

=== Poetry ===
- Poems. Calcutta: Writers Workshop, 1967.
- More Poems. Calcutta: Writers Workshop, 1971.
- Cyclone In Pakistan. Calcutta: Writers Workshop, 1971.
- The Jackass and the Lady. Calcutta: Writers Workshop, 1980.
- The Authentic Lie. Fredericton: Fiddlehead Poetry Books, 1982. ISBN 0864920105
- From the Bedside Book of Nightmares. Fredericton: Goose Lane Editions, 1984. ISBN 0864920318
- Flesh and Paper (with Gillian Hanscombe). UK: Jezebel Tapes and Books, 1986. ISBN 9781870240000
- Because of India: Selected Poems and Fables. London: Onlywomen Press, 1989. ISBN 9780906500330
- Sycorax: New Fables and Poems. New Delhi: Penguin Books, 2006. ISBN 9780143099840

=== Children's ===
- Aditi and the One-Eyed Monkey (illustrated by Hassan Hanife). London: Sheba Feminist Press, 1986. ISBN 9780907179306
- Aditi and the Thames Dragon (illustrated by Bindia Thapar). Chennai: Tulika Publishers, 2002. ISBN 978-81-86895-57-3
- Aditi and the Marine Sage (illustrated by Bindia Thapar). Chennai: Tulika Publishers, 2004. ISBN 9788181460400
- Aditi and the Techno Sage (illustrated by Shefalee Jain). Chennai: Tulika Publishers, 2005. ISBN 978-81-8146-161-2
- Aditi and Her Friends Take on the Vesuvian Giant (illustrated by Shefalee Jain). Chennai: Tulika Publishers, 2007. ISBN 978-81-8146-342-5
- Aditi and Her Friends Meet Grendel (illustrated by Shefalee Jain). Chennai: Tulika Publishers, 2007. ISBN 978-81-8146-436-1
- Aditi and Her Friends Help the Budapest Changeling (illustrated by Shefalee Jain). Chennai: Tulika Publishers, 2007. ISBN 978-81-8146-438-5
- Aditi and Her Friends In Search of Shemeek (illustrated by Shefalee Jain). Chennai: Tulika Publishers, 2008. ISBN 978-81-8146-440-8
- Gardy in the City of Lions (illustrated by Proiti Roy). Chennai: Tulika Publishers, 2009. ISBN 978-81-8146-778-2
- Monkeyji and the Word Eater (illustrated by Proiti Roy). Chennai: Tulika Publishers, 2009. ISBN 978-81-8146-779-9
- Siril and The Spaceflower (illustrated by Proiti Roy). Chennai: Tulika Publishers, 2009. ISBN 9788181467805
- Beautiful and the Cyberspace Runaway (illustrated by Proiti Roy). Chennai: Tulika Publishers, 2009. ISBN 978-81-8146-781-2
- Blue and Other Stories (illustrated by Nilima Sheikh). Chennai: Tulika Publishers, 2012. ISBN 978-93-5046-176-1
- Little i (illustrated by Sayan Mukherjee). Chennai: Tulika Publishers, 2014. ISBN 978-93-5046-572-1
- The Boy and Dragon Stories (illustrated by Krishna Bala Shenoi). Chennai: Tulika Publishers, 2015. ISBN 978-93-5046-720-6
- Aditi Adventures 13: The Antarctic Mission (illustrated by Shefalee Jain). Chennai: Tulika Publishers, 2020. ISBN 978-93-89203-79-0
- In the Land Where Beetles Rule (illustrated by Krishna Bala Shenoi). India: Pratham Books, 2022. ISBN 978-93-5467-297-2

=== Translation ===
- Poems of Govindagraj by Ram Ganesh Gadkari. Translated by Suniti Namjoshi and Sarojini Namjoshi. Calcutta: Writers Workshop, 1968.
