= Anna Livia (author) =

Irish born lesbian writer, novelist, translator, and academic

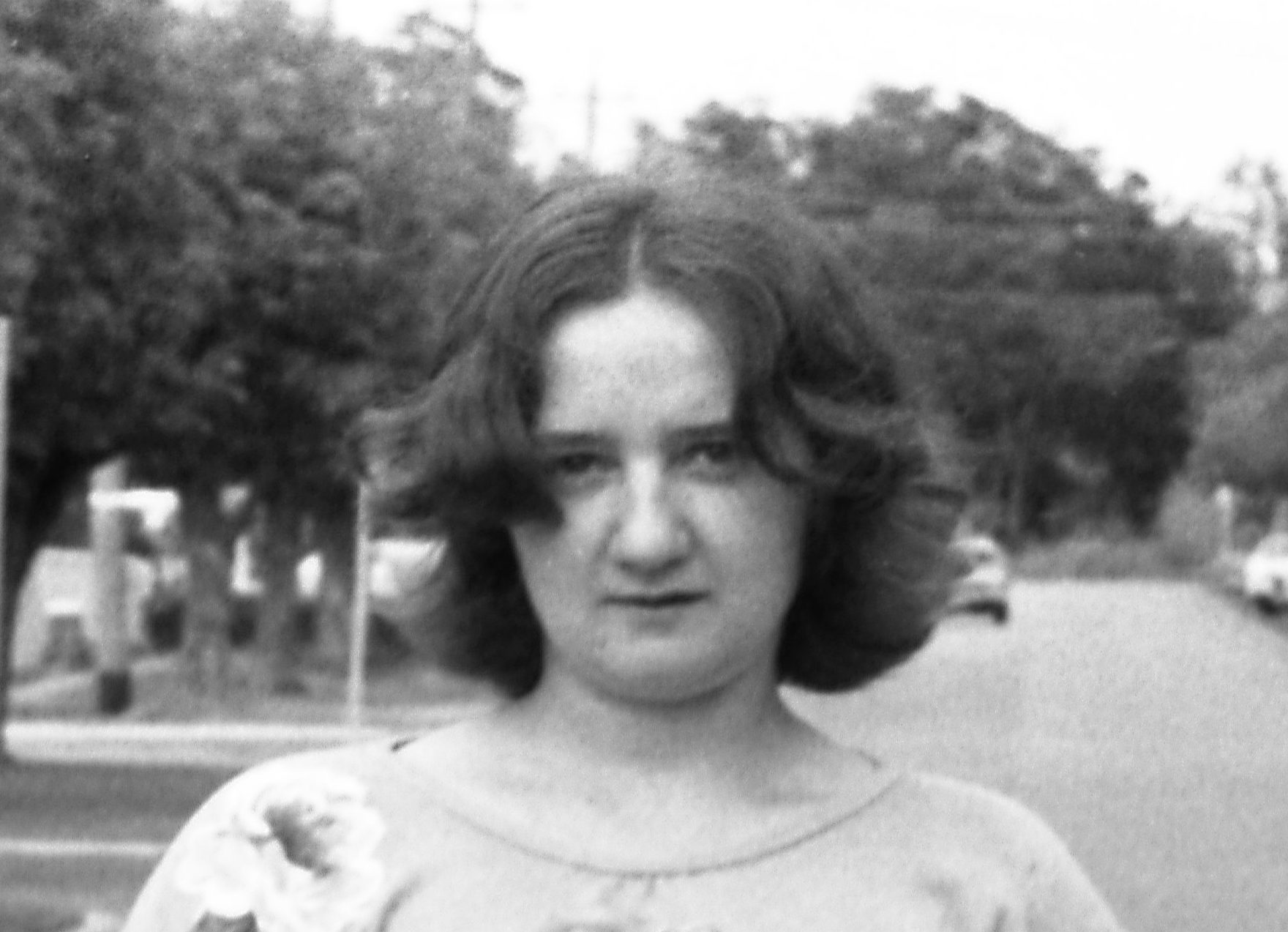
- Anna Livia in Nedlands, Western Australia in the 1970s
- Born: Anna Livia Julian Brawn; 13 November 1955; Dublin, Ireland
- Died: 7 August 2007 (aged 51); California, United States
- Education: University of California, Berkeley
- Known for: Lesbian feminist fiction and queer linguistics
- Children: 2

Anna Livia (born Anna Livia Julian Brawn; 13 November 1955 – 7 August 2007) was a lesbian feminist author and linguist, well known for her fiction and non-fiction regarding sexuality. From 1999 until shortly before the time of her death she was a member of staff at University of California, Berkeley.

== Personal life and education ==
Anna Livia was born on 13 November 1955, in Dublin, Ireland. She was born to Patrick St. John, a writer and film maker, and Dympna Brawn, a poet, and had two brothers and a sister. She was named after Julian of Norwich and Anna Livia Plurabelle, the character from James Joyce's novel Finnegans Wake.

The family moved to Luanshya, Zambia in 1960, and then to Swaziland where she attended the Waterford Kamhlaba boarding school in Mbabane. In 1970, they moved to the United Kingdom. Livia attended the Rosa Bassett School in South London for her primary and secondary education.

Livia graduated from the University College London in 1979 with a Bachelors of Arts in French with a minor in Italian. She also received a post-graduate certificate in education from UCL in 1981.

In 1999, she had twins with her partner Jeannie Witkin; they eventually split up but continued to co-parent their children. At the time of her death, Livia's partner was Patti Roberts.

Livia died suddenly of natural causes on 7 August 2007.

== Career and writing ==
In the 1980s, she taught French and English at the University of Avignon. She was a co-director of the Feminist Press in London from 1982–1989. From 1983–1990, she was an editor for Onlywomen Press as well as their periodical, Gossip, from 1984–1988. From 1994–2002, she edited for the Lesbian Review of Books.

In 1995, she received her doctorate in French linguistics from the University of California, Berkeley. She taught at the University of Illinois at Urbana–Champaign from 1995 to 1998. She began teaching at UC Berkeley in 1999, which she continued to do until her death. She published her revised PhD thesis, Pronoun Envy (2000), in which she "developed a feminist analysis of the use of pronouns," in English and French writing. From 2001–2002, she taught as a visiting lecturer at Mills College.

=== Relatively Norma (1982) ===
Livia's first novel is about Minnie, a lesbian from London, who travels to Australia to visit with and come out to her family. They barely react to her pronouncement of lesbianism, seemingly too busy with their own lives and identities. In her book Contemporary Lesbian Writing: Dreams, Desire, Difference, Paulina Palmer argues that Livia's novel "questions the significance of lesbianism as the key to personal identity," and "humorously exposes the excuses heterosexuals employ to avoid confronting and discussing the subject of lesbianism." Sally Munt, in her exploration of lesbian novels between 1979 and 1989, generally views the novel positively, but states that it is filled with "counter-cultural specificities of early 1980s London feminism," that border on the "self-referential claustrophobia which can sentence a text to obscurity outside its own sycophantic subculture."

All of the male characters names are John, as a reference to clients of prostitutes. In an interview for The Leveller, Livia explains that "As a lesbian-feminist, I write in a lesbian-feminist context...The male characters are all called John...that's saying I think all men are Johns, which is true.... If other women want to read it, they'll have to imagine themselves into the lesbian feminist framework."

== Awards ==
Three of Livia's books were nominated for Lambda Literary Awards for Lesbian Fiction. Incidents Involving Mirth was nominated in 1990, Minimax in 1991, and Bruised Fruit in 1999. She won a Vermont Booksellers Association Special Merit Award for translation.

== Selected works ==
=== Fiction ===
==== Novels ====
- Relatively Norma (1982) London: Onlywomen Press. ISBN 0-906500-10-9
- Accommodation Offered (1985) London: Women's Press, 1985. ISBN 0-7043-2857-7
- Bulldozer Rising (1988) Onlywomen (publisher). ISBN 0-906500-27-3
- From a Hole in Heaven's Floor (1990) Sault Ste. Marie, ON, Canada : Tyro Pub., ISBN 0-921249-18-7
- Minimax (1991) Portland, Or. : Eighth Mountain Press. ISBN 0-933377-12-6
- Bruised Fruit (1999) Jackson, Tennessee, U.S.A. Firebrand Books. ISBN 1-56341-106-7

==== Collections ====
- Incidents Involving Warmth: A Collection of Lesbian Feminist Love Stories (1986) London : Only Women Press. ISBN 0-906500-21-4
- The Pied Piper : lesbian feminist fiction, with Lillian Mohin. Publisher: London : Onlywomen, 1989. ISBN 0-906500-29-X OCLC 60022644
- Saccharin Cyanide (1990) Onlywomen. ISBN 0-906500-35-4
- Incidents Involving Mirth: Short Stories (1990). Publisher: Portland, Or. : Eighth Mountain Press, 1990. ISBN 0-933377-14-2

=== Non-fiction ===
==== Edited works ====
- Livia, Anna; Rodarmor, William, eds. (2008). France: A Traveler's Literary Companion. Vol. 16. Whereabouts Press. ISBN 978-1883513184.

==== Books ====
- Livia, Anna; Hall, Kira (1997). Queerly Phrased: Language, Gender, and Sexuality. New York: Oxford University Press. ISBN 0195104714.
- — (2000). Pronoun Envy: Literary Uses of Linguistic Gender. New York: Oxford University Press. ISBN 0195138538.

==== Articles and essays ====
- Livia, Anna (1993). "Look on the bright side". In Reti, Irene (ed.). Unleashing Feminism: Critiquing Lesbian Sadomasochism in the Gay Nineties. Santa Cruz, California: HerBooks. ISBN 9780939821044.
- Livia, Anna (1999). "Doing Sociolinguistic Research on the French Minitel". American Behavioral Scientist. 43 (3). Sage Publications: 422–435. doi:10.1177/00027649921955353. S2CID 143840175.
- Livia, Anna (2000). "Oral History: Snapshots from a Family Album". International Journal of Sexuality and Gender Studies. 5 (2). Springer: 215–219. doi:10.1023/A:1010184931116. S2CID 141363708.
- Livia, Anna (2002). "Public and Clandestine: Gay Men's Pseudonyms on the French Minitel". Sexualities. 5 (2). Sage Publications: 201–217. doi:10.1177/1363460702005002004. ISSN 1363-4607. S2CID 144203082.
- "Barney, Natalie Clifford (1876-1972)". glbtq: An Encyclopedia of Gay, Lesbian, Bisexual, Transgender, and Queer Culture. 2002. Archived from the original on 16 January 2008.
- "Dykewomon, Elana (b. 1949)". glbtq: An Encyclopedia of Gay, Lesbian, Bisexual, Transgender, and Queer Culture. 2002. Archived from the original on 14 August 2007.

=== Translations ===
- A Perilous Advantage: The Best of Natalie Clifford Barney Chicago, IL: New Victoria Publishers Inc., 1992. ISBN 978-0-934678-38-4.
- The Angel and the Perverts (by Lucie Delarue-Mardrus) (Original French edition published in 1930)-(1995) New York: New York University Press. ISBN 0-8147-5098-2
