= Mary Dorcey =

Irish poet, novelist, short story writer and activist

- Born: October 1950 (age 75); County Dublin, Ireland
- Education: Open University
- Occupations: Writer, poet

Mary Dorcey (born October 1950) is an Irish author and poet, feminist, and LGBT+ activist. Her work is known for centring feminist and queer themes, specifically lesbian love and lesbian eroticism.

She has published ten books, including seven poetry collections, a collection of short stories, a novel, and one novella. Her latest book, a poetry collection entitled Life Holds Its Breath, was published in 2022 by Salmon Poetry.

She has won five major awards for literature from the Arts Council of Ireland in 1990, 1995, 1999, 2005, and 2008. In 2010, following nominations by the poet Nuala Ní Dhomhnaill and novelist Eugene McCabe, Dorcey was elected to the Irish Academy of Writers and Artists, Aosdána.

Her poems are taught on both the Irish Junior Certificate English curriculum and on the British O Level English curriculum.

== Biography ==
Dorcey was born in County Dublin, Ireland. She was the first Irish student at the Open University in England and attended Paris Diderot University in Paris, France. She has lived and worked in the United States, England, France, Spain, and Japan, and now resides in County Wicklow.

Dorcey was the first Irish woman to address gay and lesbian lives in poetry and fiction. She joined the Irish Women's Liberation Movement in 1972 and was a founding member of Irish Women United, Women for Radical Change, and The Movement for Sexual Liberation. She came out in 1974. Her first collection of poetry, Kindling, was published in London, in 1987 by the feminist publishing house Onlywomen Press. She has since published six additional poetry collections, a novel, a novella, and a collection of short stories.

Her poetry and fiction are taught at universities throughout Europe, the United States, and Canada. Over the past 30 years her work has been the subject of academic essays and critiques.

== Critical response ==
Dorcey's writing is noted as the first work of Irish literature to portray romantic and erotic relationships between women. Examples include A Noise from the Woodshed (1989), and Biography of Desire (1997). Her themes include the cathartic role of the outsider, political injustice, and the nature of the erotic power to subvert and transfigure.

Both her short story collection, A Noise from the Woodshed, and her novel, Biography of Desire, are included in 'The Greatest Book List Ever' in Robert Lindsay's Classic Books of the Past One Hundred Years. Her short story collection A Noise from the Woodshed won The Rooney Prize for Irish Literature in 1990.

Her work has been performed on radio and television, and her stories have been dramatized for radio (BBC) and for stage productions in Ireland, Britain, and Australia: In the Pink (The Raving Beauties) and Sunny Side Plucked.

== Recognition ==
Dorcey's poetry and fiction have been reproduced in more than one hundred anthologies representing Irish, gay, and women's literature. Her poems have been performed on radio and television stations, such as BBC, RTÉ, and Channel 4, and have been taught on the English curriculum for the Irish Junior Certificate and British GCSEs.

"First Love" was selected for the revised Junior Cycle and included in the BBC anthology A Hundred Favourite Poems of Childhood. Her stories have been dramatized for radio and stage productions in Ireland, the United Kingdom, and Australia. In March 2023, her poem "Summer" was broadcast on the London Underground to mark St Patrick's Day.

She is currently a research associate at Trinity College Dublin, where she conducted contemporary English literature seminars and led a creative writing workshop during her ten years as a writer in residence at the Centre for Gender and Women's Studies. Dorcey also taught Creative Writing courses at the University College Dublin's School for Justice.

== Bibliography ==
=== Poetry ===
- Kindling (London, Onlywomen Press, 1982)
- Moving into The Space Cleared by our Mothers (Salmon Poetry, 1991)
- The River That Carries Me (Salmon Poetry, 1995)
- Like Joy in Season, Like Sorrow. (Salmon Poetry, 2001)
- Perhaps the heart is Constant After All. (Salmon Poetry, 2012)
- To Air the Soul, Throw All the Windows Wide. (Salmon Poetry, 2016) New and selected poetry.
- Life Holds Its Breath. (Salmon Poetry, 2022)

=== Books, essays and short stories ===
- A Noise from the Woodshed: Short Stories Onlywomen Press, London, 1989.
- Scarlett O'Hara (novella) in the anthology In and Out of Time, Onlywomen Press, London, 1990.
- Biography of Desire (novel) Poolbeg, Dublin, 1997.
- "The Fate of Aoife and the Children of Lir" in Ride on Rapunzel, Fairytales for Feminists ed. Maeve Binchy, Attic Press, 1992.
- "The Lift Home" in Virgins and Hyacinths ed. Caroline Walsh, Attic Press, 1993.
- "The Orphan" in In Sunshine or in Shadow ed. Mary Maher, Delta editions, Random House, 1999.
- "A Glorious Day" in The Faber Book Of Best New Irish Short Stories 2006–2007 ed. David Marcus.
- "Adrienne" in Queer Love: an anthology of Irish fiction ed. Paul McVeigh, Southword Editions, 2021.

=== Staged dramatisations ===
- In the Pink (The Raving Beauties)
- Sunny Side Plucked (Dublin, Project Arts Centre)

== See also ==
- Lesbian poetry
