= The Feminists =

Defunct American feminist group (1968–1973)

- Formation: 1968
- Founder: Ti-Grace Atkinson
- Founded at: New York City, U.S.
- Dissolved: 1973; 52 years ago
- Formerly called: October 17th Movement

The Feminists (also known as Feminists—A Political Organization to Annihilate Sex Roles, formerly as October 17th Movement) was a second-wave radical feminist group active in New York City from 1968 to 1973.

== History ==
The group was founded in 1968 as a split from the New York City chapter of National Organization for Women (NOW) by members who felt NOW was not radical enough. It was originally called the October 17th Movement after the date that it was founded, but soon changed its name to The Feminists. Ti-Grace Atkinson was the group's central figure and informal leader until she left the group in 1971; other prominent members included Anne Koedt (who left in 1969 to co-found New York Radical Feminists), Sheila Michaels, Barbara Mehrhof, Pamela Kearon, and Sheila Cronan.

The Feminists' best-known action may have been in September 1969, when members picketed the New York City Marriage License Bureau, distributing pamphlets protesting the marriage contract: "All the discriminatory practices against women are patterned and rationalized by this slavery-like practice. We can't destroy the inequities between men and women until we destroy marriage."

== Ideology ==
According to Germaine Greer in The Female Eunuch (1970), The Feminists promoted not having leaders in society, "characterized men as the enemy", described "Love" as "the response of the victim to the rapist", and believed that "the proprietary relationship of marriage" and uterine pregnancy would "no longer prevail".

The Feminists held that women were oppressed by their internalization of patriarchal sex roles, and hence suffered from a kind of false consciousness. To liberate themselves from such oppressive roles, The Feminists held that the feminist movement must be entirely autonomous from men and eventually came to hold that women should be free of men in their personal lives as well. The group was strongly opposed to the sexual revolution, holding that it was simply a way for men to get easier access to women's bodies. Ti-Grace Atkinson was one of the first radical feminists to be specifically critical of pornography. According to Muriel Fox, Atkinson resigned from this organization in 1971 due to "members trashing her."

They at first advocated that women practice celibacy, and later came to advocate political lesbianism. The separatist ideas of The Feminists were reflected in their membership quota, restricting women who lived with men to one-third of its members, and excluding married women entirely in 1971. After Atkinson's departure, The Feminists moved in the direction of advocating matriarchy and developing a "woman's religion", ideas that later came to be known as cultural feminism.

== Later years ==
Although The Feminists disbanded in 1973, they played an important role in the development of cultural feminism, separatist feminism, and anti-pornography feminism (Barbara Mehrhof later became an organizer for Women Against Pornography), tendencies that were predominant in radical feminism by the late 1970s.
