= Jay Taverner =

Pseudonym for the writing partnership of Jacky Bratton and Jane Traies

Jay Taverner is the pseudonym for the writing partnership of Jacky Bratton and Jane Traies. The pair were a long-established lesbian partnership who met as undergraduates at St Anne's College, Oxford, in 1963.

Their series of books deals with historical lesbian characters.

Bratton went on to an academic career at the University of London, publishing on nineteenth-century popular culture and latterly concentrating on performance; she is now research professor in Theatre and Cultural History at Royal Holloway, University of London.

In 2014, Traies finished a PhD at the University of Sussex looking at the lives of older lesbians in Britain.

== Publications ==
- Rebellion (Onlywomen Press, 1997)
- Hearts and Minds (Diva Books, 2001)
- Something Wicked (Onlywomen Press, 2002)
