= The Industrial Vagina =

2008 book by Sheila Jeffreys

The Industrial Vagina: The Political Economy of the Global Sex Trade
- Cover of the first edition
- Author: Sheila Jeffreys
- Language: English
- Subject: Prostitution
- Publisher: Routledge
- Publication date: 2008
- Publication place: United Kingdom
- Media type: Print (hardcover and paperback)
- Pages: 244
- ISBN: 978-0-415-41232-2 (hardback); 978-0-415-41233-9 (paperback); 978-0-203-69830-3 (ebook)

The Industrial Vagina: The Political Economy of the Global Sex Trade is a 2008 book about prostitution and the sex industry by the political scientist Sheila Jeffreys. It received positive reviews, praising Jeffreys for covering many different aspects of the sex industry.

== Summary ==
In the book, Jeffreys argues that the prostitution and the sex trade have become a massive global market that makes up a significant portion of national and global economies. She demonstrates that they have gone from minor, marginal practices to legitimised and profitable industries.

Jeffreys contends that the modern sex industry maintains women's subordination and that governments that legalise prostitution are taking the role of pimps, allowing men in countries with less gender inequality to have access to the bodies of women from the global south.

The book discusses the growing reach of pornography; the increase in adult shops, strip clubs and escort agencies; military prostitution and sexual violence in war; the mail order bride industry; and sex tourism and trafficking.

== Publication history ==
The Industrial Vagina was published by Routledge in 2009.

== Reception ==
The Industrial Vagina received positive reviews from the feminist Julie Bindel in The Guardian, Sarah Nelson in Women's Studies, A. K. in The Contemporary Review, and Mindy A. Menn in the Journal of Sex Research. The book was also reviewed by Natalie Purcell in Feminism & Psychology, Vidyamali Samarasinghe in Gender & Society, and Nicola J. Smith in the Review of International Political Economy, and discussed by Kate Holden in Meanjin.

Bindel wrote that, "The strength of Jeffreys' new work lies in just how many aspects of the sex industry she covers, and her understanding of their intersections". Nelson credited Jeffreys with demonstrating "the ways in which governments eager for revenue have decriminalized the sex trade" and concluded that her "provocative book ... should be devoured by any with an interest in gender, feminism, globalization, economy, sociology, cultural studies, and history." A. K. called the book "timely, shocking, and, sadly, necessary". Menn credited Jeffreys with discussing "the intricately intertwined facets of the global sex industry" more broadly than any other author, with "focusing on a broad spectrum of issues and incorporating empirical data from around the globe on each aspect of the industry", and with meticulously documenting the subject. She also praised Jeffreys's "unapologetic, radical feminist writing style".
