= Political lesbianism =

Movement in lesbian feminism

Political lesbianism is a phenomenon within feminism, primarily second-wave feminism and radical feminism; it includes, but is not limited to, lesbian separatism. Political lesbianism asserts that sexual orientation is a political and feminist choice, and advocates lesbianism as a positive alternative to heterosexuality for women as part of the struggle against sexism.

== History ==
Political lesbianism originated in the late 1960s among "second-wave" radical feminists as a way to fight sexism and compulsory heterosexuality. Sheila Jeffreys helped to develop the concept when she co-wrote in 1981 "Love Your Enemy? The Debate Between Heterosexual Feminism and Political Lesbianism" with the Leeds Revolutionary Feminist Group. They argued that women should abandon heterosexuality and stop sleeping with men, while encouraging women to rid men "from your beds and your heads".

While the main idea of political lesbianism is to be separate from men, this does not necessarily mean that political lesbians are required to have sex with women. According to the Leeds Revolutionary Feminist Group, the definition of a political lesbian is "a woman-identified woman who does not fuck men". They proclaimed men the enemy and women who were in relationships with them, collaborators and complicit in their own oppression. Heterosexual behaviour is seen as the basic unit of the patriarchy's political structure, and therefore lesbians who reject heterosexual behaviour are seen as disrupting the established political system.

Ti-Grace Atkinson, a radical feminist who helped found the group The Feminists, is credited with the phrase that came to embody the movement: "Feminism is the theory; lesbianism is the practice."

== Idea ==
For some women, feminism provided a platform to escape expectations to uphold heterosexual norms, traditional sexuality, marriage and bearing children; a life viewed by some feminists as one of hard labor with little consideration and a system that subordinates women. Political lesbians argue that by further removing themselves from dominating heterosexual relationships and declaring themselves as lesbians, women are aligning themselves with shared interests of women, i.e. the political identification of women with other women. This is partly based on the idea that women sharing and promoting a common interest creates a positive and needed energy which is necessary to enhance and elevate the role of women in the society, a development which will be curtailed by the institutions of heterosexuality and sexism if women choose the traditional norms.

Political lesbianism realigns the issue of lesbianism as one focused purely on personal pain or anguish, instead framing it as an important political issue and feminist strategy. In this sense, it defines lesbianism not purely in terms of sexuality.

Though there has historically been discrimination against lesbians within the feminist movement, the movement still ended up providing a needed political platform for them. In its wake, it also expanded and introduced divergent views of sexuality.

== Lesbian separatism ==
Separatist feminism is a form of radical feminism that holds that opposition to patriarchy is best done through focusing exclusively on women and girls. Generally, separatist feminists do not believe that men can make positive contributions to the feminist movement, and that even well-intentioned men replicate the dynamics of patriarchy. In a similar vein, lesbian separatism advocated for the separation of lesbian women from what they characterise as a heterosexist, sexist society.

Charlotte Bunch, an early member of The Furies Collective, viewed lesbian separatism as a strategy, a "first step" period, or temporary withdrawal from mainstream activism to accomplish specific goals or enhance personal growth. Members of The Furies Collective recommended that lesbian separatists relate "only (with) women who cut their ties to male privilege" and suggest that "as long as women still benefit from heterosexuality, receive its privileges and security, they will at some point have to betray their sisters, especially Lesbian sisters who do not receive those benefits".

== Criticism ==
Some feminist theory on sexuality evaded biological fixation and embraced social construction as the basis of sexuality. However, this idea posed further questions on the subject of sexuality and lesbianism, and the long-term sustainability of a purely lesbian society without men or children. If sexuality could be a construction of human nature, then little room is given to understanding the nature of the historical formation of human nature, especially, if the historical nature of man or woman enhanced heterosexuality.

A lack of theoretical clarity of lesbianism and sexuality becomes more profound as sexuality is viewed as much more than choice. Also, if lesbianism becomes a social institution, the avenue for a dominant persona in the relationships may also pose challenge to the original intention of political lesbianism. According to A Dictionary of Gender Studies, some lesbians who believed themselves to be 'born that way' considered political lesbians or those who believe lesbianism is a choice based on institutionalised heterosexuality were appropriating the term 'lesbian' and not experiencing or speaking out against the oppression that those women experience. Additionally, some feminists argue that "political lesbianism," which reduces lesbianism as a political choice to reject men and the penises, overlooks the deeply personal nature of lesbianism as an expression of attraction between women and erases the experiences of trans women and their lesbian partners.

== See also ==
- T4T
- 4B movement
- Lesbian erasure
- Lesbian feminism
- Lesbophobia
- Fourth-wave feminism
- Radicalesbians
- Radical lesbians
- Womyn's land

Proponents

- Gloria E. Anzaldúa
- Yvonne Rainer
