= Sheila Jeffreys =

English-Australian activist and author (born 1948)

- Born: 13 May 1948 (age 78); London, England
- Occupations: Activist; author
- Movement: Revolutionary feminism, political lesbianism, anti-transgender movement in the United Kingdom
- Website: sheila-jeffreys.com

Sheila Jeffreys (born 13 May 1948) is an English-born former professor of political science at the University of Melbourne. A lesbian feminist scholar, she analyses the history and politics of human sexuality. She is the author of several books about feminism and feminist history, including The Spinster and Her Enemies (1985), The Sexuality Debates (1987), Anticlimax (1990), Unpacking Queer Politics (2003), Beauty and Misogyny (2005), and Gender Hurts (2014).

Jeffreys argues that women suffering pain in pursuit of beauty is a form of submission to patriarchal sadism; that transgender people reproduce oppressive gender roles and mutilate their bodies through sex reassignment surgery; and that lesbian culture has been negatively affected by emulating the sexist influence of the gay male subculture of dominant/submissive sexuality. Her argument that the "sexual revolution" on men's terms contributed less to women's freedom than to their continued oppression has both commanded respect and attracted intense criticism.

== Early life ==
Jeffreys was born to a working-class army family from London's East End. After attending an all-girls grammar school, she studied at Manchester University, then taught at a girls' boarding school. In 1973, Julie Bindel writes, Jeffreys decided "to abandon both heterosexuality and her feminine appearance". Jeffreys wrote in Beauty and Misogyny (2005):

In 1973 I gave up beauty practices as part of [the feminist] movement, supported by the strength of the thousands of heterosexual and lesbian women around me who were also rejecting them. I stopped dyeing my hair 'mid-golden sable' and cut it short. I stopped wearing make-up. I stopped wearing high heels and, eventually, gave up skirts. I stopped shaving my armpits and legs. I did not go back to these practices even during the darkest years of the 1990s and early 2000s, when the strength of the Women's Liberation Movement was no longer there to support the rejection of these cultural requirements."

== Works ==
In 1979, Jeffreys helped write Love Your Enemy? The Debate Between Heterosexual Feminism and Political Lesbianism, along with other members of the Leeds Revolutionary Feminist Group. Its authors stated, "We do think ... that all feminists can and should be lesbians. Our definition of a political lesbian is a woman-identified woman who does not fuck men. It does not mean compulsory sexual activity with women." Jeffreys was one of several contributors to The Sexual Dynamics of History: Men's Power, Women's Resistance, an anthology of feminist writings about gender relations published in 1983 by the London Feminist History Group. Jeffreys wrote the chapter on "Sex reform and anti-feminism in the 1920s".

In The Spinster and Her Enemies: Feminism and Sexuality 1880–1930, published in 1985, Jeffreys examines feminist involvement in the Social Purity movement at the turn of the century. In her 1990 work Anticlimax: A Feminist Perspective on the Sexual Revolution, Jeffreys offered a critique of the sexual revolution of the 1960s. The Lesbian Heresy was published in 1993. In it, Jeffreys criticises BDSM and sadomasochistic practices involving women. One author involved in sadomasochism cites Jeffreys' views in this book as an example of the "simplistic and dualistic thinking" among anti-sadomasochism campaigners. Jeffreys describes sadomasochism as "male supremacist", a reenactment of heterosexual male dominance and women's oppression that glorifies violence and uses women's bodies as a sex aid, and as anti-lesbian and fascistic. The author claims that Jeffreys ignores that some heterosexual women may enjoy sadomasochistic activity, and that "tops" may be women who work hard to give their "bottoms" pleasure, rather than the passive recipients of sex in the way she describes.

The Industrial Vagina: The Political Economy of the Global Sex Trade was published in 2009. In it, Jeffreys describes the globalisation of the sex market, and calls marriage a form of prostitution. Jeffreys writes, "the right of men to women's bodies for sexual use has not gone, but remains an assumption at the basis of heterosexual relationships", and draws links between marriage and prostitution, such as mail-order brides, which she sees as a form of trafficking.

== Views on transgender issues ==
The University of Melbourne, Jeffreys' employer until her retirement in May 2015, listed her areas of expertise thusly: "Female-to-male transsexualism; Gay pornography; Feminist critiques of queer theory; Queer political agenda; International sex industry. (Western beauty practices as makeup, high heel shoes, cosmetic surgery, as well as pornochic; Misogyny in fashion and transfemininity.)"

In an interview, the writer Julie Bindel explains that Jeffreys believes sex reassignment surgery is "an extension of the beauty industry offering cosmetic solutions to deeper rooted problems" and that in a society without gender this would be unnecessary. Jeffreys has presented these views in various forums. In a 1997 article in the Journal of Lesbian Studies, for example, Jeffreys contended that "transsexualism should be seen as a violation of human rights". Jeffreys also argued that "the vast majority of transsexuals still subscribe to the traditional stereotype of women" and that by transitioning medically and socially, trans women are "constructing a conservative fantasy of what women should be. They are inventing an essence of womanhood which is deeply insulting and restrictive."

Jeffreys' opinions on these topics have been challenged by some transgender people. Roz Kaveney, a trans woman and critic of Jeffreys, wrote in The Guardian that Jeffreys and radical feminists who share her views are "acting like a cult". Kaveney compared Jeffreys' desire to ban sex-reassignment surgery to the Catholic Church's desire to ban abortion, arguing that both proposals bear negative "implications for all women". Kaveney also criticised Jeffreys and her supporters for alleged "anti-intellectualism, emphasis on innate knowledge, fetishisation of tiny ideological differences, heresy hunting, conspiracy theories, rhetorical use of images of disgust, talk of stabs in the back and romantic apocalypticism." Jeffreys' viewpoints that are critical of rights for transgender people, but justifying them in the defense of rights for women, have led her to be labeled as a TERF (trans-exclusionary radical feminist).

Gender Hurts: A Feminist Analysis of the Politics of Transgenderism, a book cowritten by Jeffreys and Lorene Gottschalk, was published in April 2014. Timothy Laurie argued that the formalization of social dynamics between men and women in Gender Hurts in terms of "strategies' and dividends" risks "confusing the continued existence of unequal economic exchanges (well documented by R.W. Connell) with the less predictable, but equally important, struggles over what gets labeled 'masculine' and 'feminine' and for what collective purposes".

In May 2014, the philosopher Judith Butler commented on Jeffreys' view that sex reassignment surgery is directly political. To Jeffreys' notion that reassignment surgery is a component of patriarchal control, Butler responded that "One problem with that view of social construction is that it suggests that what trans people feel about what their gender is, and should be, is itself 'constructed' and, therefore, not real. And then the feminist police comes along".

In Gender Hurts (2014), Jeffreys argues that using pronouns reflecting biological sex is important for feminists, as the feminine pronoun represents respect for cisgender women's historical subordination. She believes trans women can't hold this status, as they haven't experienced the same oppression, and using feminine pronouns for them masks their retained masculine privilege. In April 2015, radical feminist legal theorist Catharine A. MacKinnon responded, stating that Jeffreys' stance on pronouns is based on a nature-based moral view, which contradicts feminist achievements, especially from the political analysis of gender politics.

Jeffreys stated in a 2014 ABC Radio "Sunday Night Safran" program that trans women are either "homosexual men who don’t feel they can be homosexual in the bodies of men" or "heterosexual men who have a sexual interest in wearing women’s clothes and having the appearance of women"; in response, there was criticism from members of the trans community for alleged transphobia. Julia Serano has written that Sheila Jeffreys was an early feminist adopter of Ray Blanchard's autogynephilia theory. The concept of autogynephilia is used by trans-exclusionary radical feminists, or "gender critical" feminists, to imply that trans women are sexually deviant men.

In March 2018, addressing an audience at the House of Commons in a presentation titled "Transgenderism and the Assault on Feminism", Jeffreys said, "When men claim to be women ... and parasitically occupy the bodies of the oppressed, they speak for the oppressed", which sparked criticism. Her comments were referred to as a "fascist tactic to dehumanize" trans women by the journalist Shon Faye. Jeffreys co-founded the Women's Human Rights Campaign, which has been described as an anti-trans group.

== Selected works ==
=== Books ===
- Jeffreys, Sheila (1987). The Sexuality debates. New York: Routledge & K. Paul. ISBN 9780710209368.
- Jeffreys, Sheila (1990). Anticlimax: a feminist perspective on the sexual revolution. London: Women's Press. ISBN 9780704342033.
- Jeffreys, Sheila (1993). The lesbian heresy a feminist perspective on the lesbian sexual revolution. North Melbourne, Victoria: Spinifex. ISBN 9781875559176.
- Jeffreys, Sheila (1997). The spinster and her enemies: feminism and sexuality, 1880–1930. North Melbourne, Victoria: Spinifex. ISBN 9781875559633.
- Jeffreys, Sheila (2003). Unpacking queer politics: a lesbian feminist perspective. Cambridge Malden, Massachusetts: Polity Press in association with Blackwell Pub. ISBN 9780745628387.
- Jeffreys, Sheila (2005). Beauty and misogyny: harmful cultural practices in the West. London New York: Routledge. ISBN 9780415351829.
- Jeffreys, Sheila (2008). The idea of prostitution (2nd ed.). North Melbourne, Victoria: Spinifex. ISBN 9781876756673.
- Jeffreys, Sheila (2009). The industrial vagina: the political economy of the global sex trade. London New York: Routledge. ISBN 9780415412339.
- Jeffreys, Sheila (2012). Man's dominion: religion and the eclipse of women's rights in world politics. Abingdon, Oxfordshire New York: Routledge. ISBN 9780415596749.
- Jeffreys, Sheila (2014). Gender hurts: a feminist analysis of the politics of transgenderism. Abingdon, Oxfordshire: Routledge, Taylor & Francis Group. ISBN 9780415539401.
- Jeffreys, Sheila (2018). The Lesbian Revolution: Lesbian Feminism in the UK 1970-1990. Oxon: Routledge. ISBN 978-1138096561.
- Jeffreys, Sheila (2020). Trigger Warning - My Lesbian Feminist Life. Melbourne, Australia: Spinifex. ISBN 9781925950205.
- Jeffreys, Sheila (2022). Penile Imperialism: the male sex right and women's subordination. Mission Beach, Australia: Spinifex. ISBN 9781925950700.
- Jeffreys, Sheila (2025). Uprooting Male Domination: Dispatches from the Sex Wars. Mission Beach, Australia: Spinifex. ISBN 9781922964243.

=== Book chapters ===
- Jeffreys, Sheila (1990). "Sexology and Antifeminism". In Leidholdt, Dorchen; Raymond, Janice G. (eds.). The Sexual Liberals and the Attack on Feminism. New York and London: Teachers College Press. ISBN 978-0807762387.
- Jeffreys, Sheila (1992). "Pornography: creating the sexual future". In Hornsby, Jennifer; Frazer, Elizabeth; Lovibond, Sabina (eds.). Ethics: a feminist reader. Oxford, UK Cambridge, Massachusetts, USA: Blackwell. ISBN 9780631178316.
- Jeffreys, Sheila (1996). "Women's friendships and lesbianism". In Jackson, Stevi; Scott, Sue (eds.). Feminism and sexuality: a reader. New York: Columbia University Press. pp. 46–56. ISBN 9780231107082.
- Jeffreys, Sheila (1996). "Sadomasochism". In Jackson, Stevi; Scott, Sue (eds.). Feminism and sexuality: a reader. New York: Columbia University Press. pp. 238–244. ISBN 9780231107082.
- Jeffreys, Sheila (1996). "Return to gender: post-modernism and lesbian and gay theory". In Bell, Diane; Klein, Renate (eds.). Radically speaking: feminism reclaimed. North Melbourne, Victoria: Spinifex Press. pp. 359–374. ISBN 9781875559381.
- Jeffreys, Sheila (1996). "Heterosexuality and the desire for gender". In Richardson, Diane (ed.). Theorising heterosexuality: telling it straight. Buckingham Philadelphia, Pennsylvania: Open University Press. ISBN 9780335195046.
- Jeffreys, Sheila (1997). "The queer disappearance of lesbians". In Mintz, Beth; Rothblum, Esther D. (eds.). Lesbians in academia: degrees of freedom. New York: Routledge. pp. 269–278. ISBN 9780415917018.
- Jeffreys, Sheila (2004). "Prostitution as a harmful cultural practice". In Whisnant, Rebecca; Stark, Christine (eds.). Not for sale: feminists resisting prostitution and pornography. North Melbourne, Victoria: Spinifex Press. pp. 386–399. ISBN 9781876756499.
- Jeffreys, Sheila (2011). "Live pornography: strip clubs in the international political economy of prostitution". In Tankard Reist, Melinda; Bray, Abigail (eds.). Big Porn Inc.: exposing the harms of the global pornography industry. North Melbourne, Victoria: Spinifex Press. pp. 136–143. ISBN 9781876756895.
- Jeffreys, Sheila (2012). "Beyond 'agency' and 'choice' in theorizing prostitution". In Coy, Maddy (ed.). Prostitution, harm and gender inequality: theory, research and policy. Farnham, Surrey, England Burlington, Vermont: Ashgate. pp. 69–86. ISBN 9781409405450.

=== Essays and pamphlets ===
- Onlywomen Press (1981). Love your enemy?: the debate between heterosexual feminism and political lesbianism. London: Onlywomen Press. ISBN 9780906500088. A pamphlet by Leeds Revolutionary Feminist Group. Pdf version.
- Jeffreys, Sheila (September–October 1994). "The queer disappearance of lesbians: Sexuality in the academy". Women's Studies International Forum. 17 (5): 459–472. doi:10.1016/0277-5395(94)00051-4.
- Jeffreys, Sheila; Sullivan, Mary (2001). Legalising prostitution is not the answer: the example of Victoria, Australia (PDF). Fitzroy North, Victoria: Coalition Against Trafficking In Women. OCLC 223634685. Archived from the original (PDF) on 2 July 2016.
- Jeffreys, Sheila (15 February 2004). The legalisation of prostitution: a failed social experiment. Sisyphe.org.
