= New York City Marriage Bureau =

The Marriage Bureau is part of the Office of the City Clerk of New York City. The Bureau provides Marriage Licenses, Domestic Partnership registration, civil Marriage Ceremonies, registration of Marriage Officiants, and copies and amendments of Marriage Records issued by the City Clerk. It is the site of more marriages than any other venue in the United States.

Since 1930 over 1.2 million people have been wed at the Marriage Bureau. Between 2000 and 2007 an average of 58 couples a day were married here. In 2007, more than 16,000 couples wedded at the Manhattan Marriage Bureau.

Mayor Rudy Giuliani often performed weddings at the Marriage Bureau in person.

On February 5, 2026 Mayor Zohran Mamdani personally performed six marriages for couples scheduled to be married at the Clerks office that day.

== New venue ==
In 2008 Mayor Michael Bloomberg announced that the Bureau would move from the Manhattan Municipal Building to new quarters in order to provide a more dignified setting for the marriages of New Yorkers, and attract couples who might otherwise travel to Las Vegas to be married, boosting New York's tourist industry.

The new Marriage Bureau opened on January 12, 2009 on the ground floor at the Louis J. Lefkowitz State Office Building, a 1920s Art Deco building at 141 Worth Street (corner of Centre Street and Worth Street) that was formerly occupied by a Department of Motor Vehicles office. The 24,000 square feet (2,200 m^{2}) space was decorated by interior designer Jamie Drake who also decorated Gracie Mansion and Mayor Bloomberg's private residence. The project cost was $12 million.

The facilities contain two separate wedding chapels off the building's central rotunda. In the east chapel, the sofa and walls feature apricot and peach colors; the west chapel is done in purple and lavender. Each chapel has an abstract painting that matches the walls and hangs next to the lectern from where the clerk performs the ceremonies.

A marriage license in New York costs $35, and the fee to have the wedding performed at the Manhattan Marriage Bureau is $25. These fees can be paid by credit card or money order payable to the City Clerk.

== Fictional Marriage Bureau weddings ==
Michael Patrick Flaherty the character played by Michael J. Fox on the American sitcom Spin City is married at the Marriage Bureau.
