= Sheila Shulman =

British rabbi

Personal life
- Born: 18 October 1936 Brooklyn, New York City, U.S.
- Died: 25 October 2014 (aged 78) London, United Kingdom
- Education: Bard College; City University of New York (M.A.); Leo Baeck College

Religious life
- Religion: Judaism
- Ordination: July 1989

Sheila Shulman (18 October 1936 – 25 October 2014) was an American rabbi based primarily in London, England.

== Life ==
She was born in Brooklyn and raised in a Yiddish-speaking environment. She attended Bard College for her undergraduate studies with a full scholarship, and earned a master's degree in English and Comparative Literature in the 1960s at the City University of New York. She first travelled to England on a fellowship in 1967.

Along with Elizabeth Tikvah Sarah, she was one of the first openly lesbian graduates of the Leo Baeck College. Shulman was ordained in July 1989. In 1990, Shulman and a group of lesbian radical feminists founded London's inclusive synagogue, Beit Klal Yisrael, of which she became rabbi. In addition to her work there, after her ordination she worked at Finchley Reform Synagogue, initially part-time, then for some years as half-time Associate Rabbi, then part-time again. She also taught at Leo Baeck College-Centre for Jewish Education as a part-time Lecturer in Jewish Thought.

A collection of Shulman's sermons, Watching for the Morning, spanning ten years of congregational work was published in 2007.

Shulman died in London on 25 October 2014.

== Publications ==
- The Impact of Women in the Rabbinate, Partners in Leadership Series Pamphlet 5 (Leo Baeck College, 1992).
- Watching for the Morning: Selected Sermons (BKY Liberal Jewish Community, 2007). ISBN 9780955618307

=== Chapters ===
- Shulman, Sheila (1995). "What Is Our Love?*". In Magonet, Jonathan (ed.). Jewish Explorations of Sexuality. Berghahn Books. pp. 104–115. ISBN 978-1-57181-029-8.

=== Articles ===
- Shulman, Sheila (1987). "A Radical Feminist Perspective on Judaism". European Judaism: A Journal for the New Europe. 21 (1). Berghahn Books: 10–18. ISSN 0014-3006.
- Shulman, Sheila (1988). "An Encounter With Fackenheim". European Judaism: A Journal for the New Europe. 22 (1). Berghahn Books: 38–44. ISSN 0014-3006.
- Shulman, Sheila (1993). "The Impact of Women in the Rabbinate". European Judaism: A Journal for the New Europe. 26 (2). Berghahn Books: 23–31. doi:10.3167/001430001782384900. ISSN 0014-3006.
- "WHAT IS OUR LOVE?". Jewish Quarterly. 40 (3). 1993. doi:10.1080/0449010X.1993.10705944.
- Shulman, Sheila (1997). "The Writer and the Commissars". European Judaism: A Journal for the New Europe. 30 (1). Berghahn Books: 13–33. ISSN 0014-3006.
- Shulman, Sheila (1 January 2012). "Reading Whole". European Judaism. 45 (2). doi:10.3167/ej.2012.45.02.15. ISSN 0014-3006.
- Shulman, Sheila (1 September 2016). "'We Must use What we Have…': October–July 2003–April 2004". European Judaism. 49 (2): 143–156. doi:10.3167/ej.2016.490217. ISSN 0014-3006.
