= 1979 in LGBTQ rights =

This is a list of notable events in the history of LGBT rights that took place in the year 1979.

== Events ==
=== March ===
- 1 – The new Penal Code of Cuba enters into force, decriminalizing homosexual acts.

=== May ===
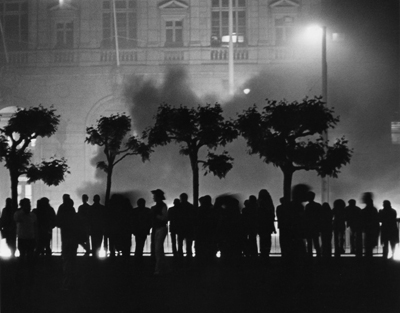
White Night riots, May 21, 1979

- 21 – The White Night riots occur in San Francisco after Dan White is convicted of two counts of voluntary manslaughter instead of murder in the assassinations of Harvey Milk and George Moscone. White had employed the so-called "Twinkie defense".
- 29 – Los Angeles outlaws discrimination against homosexuals in private sector employment and in patronization of business establishments in its city. Mayor Thomas Bradley signs bills into effect July 2.

=== September ===
- 1
  - Harry Hay, his partner John Burnside, Don Kilhefner and Mitchell L. Walker hold the Spiritual Conference for Radical Fairies gathering in Benson, Arizona, with over 75 men in attendance. The success of the event leads the men to form Radical Faeries.
  - U.S. state of New Jersey decriminalizes private consensual homosexual acts.
- 14 – An education arbitration board in Smeaton, Saskatchewan, Canada, orders Don Jones to be reinstated in his teaching job after he was fired for being gay.

=== October ===
- 14 – The National March on Washington for Lesbian and Gay Rights, the largest gay rights march to date, takes place in Washington, D.C., with about 100,000 people in attendance.

=== December ===
- 17 – United States District Court for the Central District of California Judge Irving Hill rules that the marriage of Australian Anthony Sullivan and Richard Adams, under a license issued by Boulder County, Colorado, in 1975, is not valid for purposes of Sullivan's immigration.

== See also ==
- Timeline of LGBT history – timeline of events from 12,000 BCE to present
- LGBT rights by country or territory – current legal status around the world
- LGBT social movements
