= Radical Faeries =

Counter-cultural movement

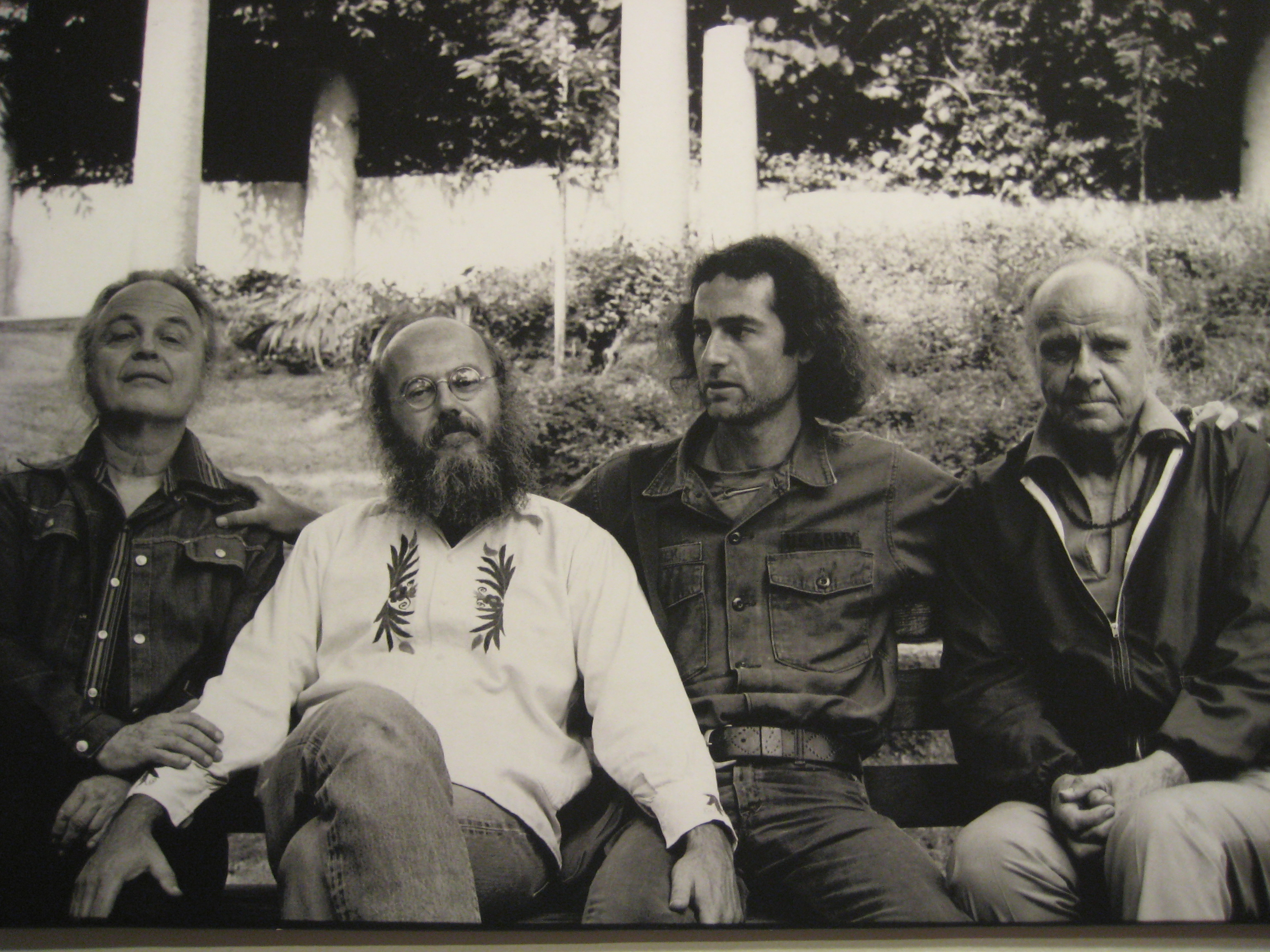
Founders of the Radical Faeries (from left) John Burnside, Don Kilhefner, Mitch Walker, and Harry Hay, were influenced by the legacy of 1960s counterculture.

Radical Faeries are a loosely affiliated worldwide network and countercultural movement blending queer consciousness and secular spirituality. Sharing various aspects with neopaganism, the movement also adopts elements from anarchism and environmentalism. Rejecting hetero-imitation, the Radical Faerie movement began during the 1970s sexual revolution among gay men in the United States. Gay activists Harry Hay, Mitch Walker, Don Kilhefner, and John Burnside organized the first Spiritual Conference for Radical Faeries in September 1979.

The network subsequently evolved alongside queer rights expansions, engaging with eclectic constructs and rituals while challenging commercialized and patriarchal aspects of modern LGBTQ+ life. Faeries tend to be fiercely independent, anti-establishment, and community-focused. Contemporary Radical Faeries embody a wide range of genders, sexual orientations, and identities.

== Philosophy and ritual ==
"We are the equivalent of Shamans in modern culture," said Peter Soderberg, during an interview at the 1985 Pagan Spirit Gathering. "Many gay men want to be middle-class Americans. They want to be respected as human beings and they want their sexuality to be ignored. But radical faeries are willing to live on the edge. We feel there is power in our sexuality. You know there is a power there because our culture is so afraid of us."

— Margot Adler, 2006

Hay's biographer Stuart Timmons described the Faeries as a "mixture of a political alternative, a counter-culture, and a spirituality movement." Peter Hennan asserted that the Faeries contained elements of "Marxism, feminism, paganism, Native American and New Age spirituality, anarchism, the mythopoetic men's movement, radical individualism, the therapeutic culture of self-fulfillment and self-actualization, earth-based movements in support of sustainable communities, spiritual solemnity coupled with a camp sensibility, gay liberation and drag."

The Radical Faerie movement was a reaction against the social emptiness that many gay men felt was present both in the heterosexual establishment and the assimilationist gay community. As one Faerie commented, in his opinion mainstream gay culture was "an oppressive parody of straight culture", taking place primarily in bars and not encouraging people to "form bonds or care for each other". In contrast, the Faeries "live their sexuality in a way that is very connected to the earth."

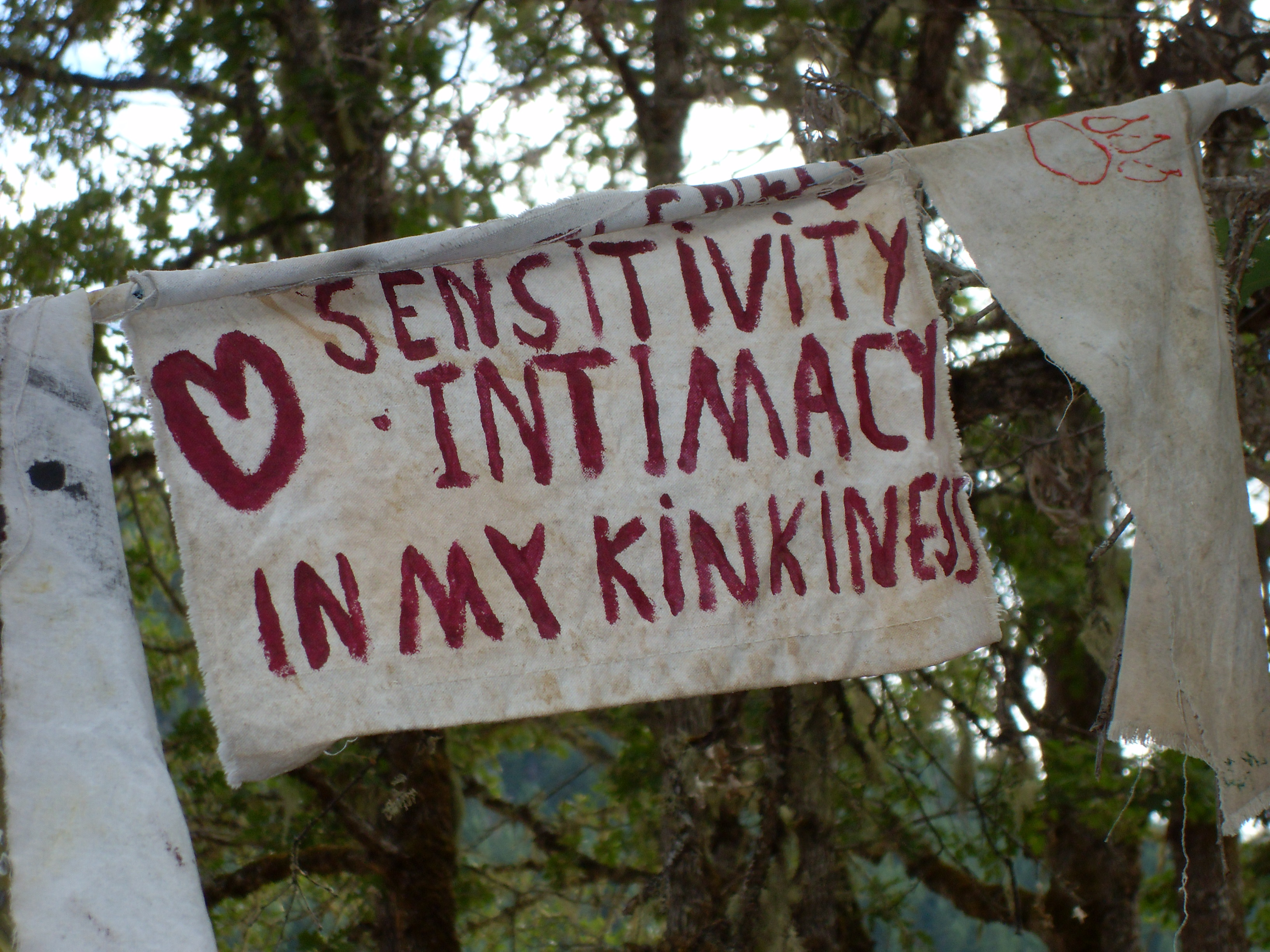
A Faerie banner

Faeries represent the first spiritual movement to be both "gay centered and gay engendered", where gayness is central to the idea, rather than in addition to, or incidental to a pre-existing spiritual tradition. The Radical Faerie exploration of the "gay spirit" is central, and that it is itself the source of spirituality, wisdom, and initiation. Mitch Walker says that "because of its indigenous, gay-centered nature, the Radical Faerie movement pioneers a new seriousness about gayness, its depth and potential, thereby heralding a new stage in the meaning of Gay Liberation."

In keeping with hippie, neopagan, and ecofeminist trends of the time, gatherings were held out-of-doors in natural settings. To this end, distinct Radical Faerie communities have created sanctuaries that are "close to the land". The Radical Faeries also incorporate fictional figures like the "Green Man" as expressions of connection to the earth and new forms of queer world-making.

Research on Radical Faerie communities show that their practices of sexuality and kinship purposefully stray from the mainstream heteronormative frameworks and trends of assimilation in LGBTQ cultures. According to scholarly ethnography, Radical Faerie gatherings are meant to support communal intimacy through ritualized expression of eroticism and the idea of a chosen family. These spaces are meant to challenge monogamy and traditional relationships in general. The Radical Faeries’ experiments with kinship serve as a spiritual and social practice that resists conventional models of gay identity and instead favors a more expansive possibility for queer belonging and connection.

== History ==
=== Foundation: 1978–79 ===
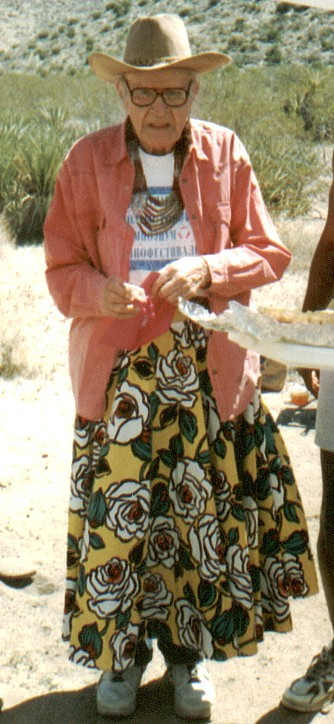
Harry Hay, a co-founder of the Radical Faerie movement, in 1996

Hay was a veteran of gay rights activism, having been a longstanding activist in the Communist Party USA prior to becoming a founding member of the Mattachine Society in 1950. After being publicly exposed as a Marxist in 1953, Hay stepped down from the Society's leadership, shortly before the other founders were forced to resign by more conservative members.

Kilhefner was a skilled community organizer and a main member of the Los Angeles branch of the Gay Liberation Front (GLF). He began hosting gay reading groups called, "Gay Voices and Visions" in 1975 at the new center Kilhefner founded, The Gay and Lesbian Community Services Center, later renamed The Los Angeles LGBT Center, where he served as its first executive director, and which is now the largest in the world.

Walker had written and published many works on gay mysticism, sexuality, depth psychology and liberation, including an article published in the Jungian journal Spring in 1976, The Double: An Archetypal Configuration, a book, "Men Loving Men, A Gay Sex Guide and Consciousness Book”, published in 1977, and he was in the process of conjuring what was to become "Visionary Love, A Spirit Book of Gay Mythology and Transmutational Faerie", published in 1980. Walker went on to spearhead a pioneering gay-centered psychologically minded grassroots movement through conducting hundreds of workshops, groups and work with many individuals.

The idea for a spiritual conference for gay consciousness exploration came out of Walker's deeply inspired correspondence with Hay beginning in 1976 and culminating a year and a half later when Walker flew to the desert to visit him in early 1978. Timmons writes: "Meeting Walker was a critical link in Harry's development of a new kind of gay movement...Walker and Hay formed the 'society of two' that grew into the Radical Faeries. The mythic, hidden aspects of gay identity that they had studied separately suddenly converged, with greatly increased current." After Hay and Walker were joined by Kilhefner in successfully presenting a workshop together in the Fall of 1978, "Hay told Walker that with 'this magnificent organizer,' Don Kilhefner, they were now a society of three. Their dreamed-of conference could now proceed."

Raised into an Amish Mennonite community, Kilhefner had studied at Howard University where he joined the anti-Vietnam War movement and the Student Nonviolent Coordinating Committee. After university, he spent time in Ethiopia with the Peace Corps before joining the Peace and Freedom Party and becoming a leading figure in the GLF from 1969 to 1971. As the GLF evolved into the Los Angeles Gay and Lesbian Community Services Center, Kilhefner became its first executive director. As it grew, it sought the support of wealthy gay people to finance its social work and public relations, with Kilhefner becoming concerned at its increasingly assimilationist stance and taking a leave of absence in 1976. He proceeded to enter into a retreat run by Baba Ram Dass, where he got into an extended conversation with Hay in May 1978.

In 2019, forty years after the fact and into his eighties, Kilhefner claimed that the Radical Faerie movement came out of conversations between Harry and him alone beginning in 1973 about "the course of the Gay Liberation movement and what was missing." Kilhefner went on to further claim that the "intellectual and spiritual foundation came out of workshops [he] hosted in 1975-1981 called Gay Voices and Visions," while completely avoiding acknowledging Walker’s central role in the forming of that foundation within the Radical Faerie movement. Kilhefner's claims directly contradict Timmons' more objective interviews with the principle players, interviews that occurred while things were actually unfolding, and who directly quoted Hay stating that it was he and Walker who initially formed the "'society of two' that grew into the Radical Faeries."

In the autumn of 1978 therapist Betty Berzon invited Hay, Walker, Burnside and Kilhefner to lead a workshop on "New Breakthroughs in the Nature of How We Perceive Gay Consciousness" at the annual conference of the Gay Academic Union, held at the University of Southern California in Los Angeles. This event convinced Hay and his partner John Burnside that they should leave their home in New Mexico and move to Los Angeles, where they settled into a 1920s house on the eastern edge of Hollywood. The four then decided to organize an outdoor conference at which they could discuss with other gay men ideas regarding gay consciousness and spirituality. Kilhefner identified an ideal location from an advert in The Advocate; the Sri Ram Ashram was a gay-friendly spiritual retreat in the desert near Benson, Arizona, owned by an American named Swami Bill. Hay, Walker, Burnside and Kilhefner visited to check its suitability, and although Hay disliked Bill and didn't want to use the site, Kilhefner insisted.

"It was lovely to see so many people shedding clothes as they shed anxieties and fears and found themselves among friends who thought as they did. There was no one around except gay men. We were the society. We weren't meeting in a building outside of which were heteros. We were the society, and we were beginning to experience what it was like to be the majority and make the rules."

— Fritz Frurip on the first Faery gathering.

Their conference, set for Labor Day 1979, was to be called the "Spiritual Conference for Radical Fairies", with the term "Radical Faerie" having been coined by Hay. The term "Radical" was chosen to reflect both political extremity and the idea of "root" or "essence", while the term "Faerie" was chosen in reference both to the immortal animistic spirits of European folklore and to the fact that "fairy" had become a pejorative slang term for gay men. Initially, Hay rejected the term "movement" when discussing the Radical Faeries, considering it to instead be a "way of life" for gay males, and he began referring to it as a "not-movement". In organising the event, Hay handled the political issues, Burnside the logistics and mechanics, Kilhefner the budgetary and administrative side, and Walker was to be its spiritual leader. A flier, which Kilhefner claims to have written, advertising the event was released and proclaimed that gays had a place in the "paradigm shift" of the New Age, and quoted Mark Satin and Aleister Crowley alongside Hay; these fliers were sent out to gay and leftist bookstores as well as gay community centres and health food stores.

Around 220 men turned up to the event, despite the fact that the Ashram could only accommodate around 75. Hay gave a welcoming speech in which he outlined his ideas regarding Subject-SUBJECT consciousness, calling on those assembled to "throw off the ugly green frogskin of hetero-imitation to find the shining Faerie prince beneath". Rather than being referred to as "workshops", the events that took place were known as "Faerie circles", and were on such varied subjects as massage, nutrition, local botany, healing energy, the politics of gay enspiritment, English country dancing, and auto-fellatio. Those assembled took part in spontaneous rituals, providing invocations to spirits and performing blessings and chants, with most participants discarding the majority of their clothes, instead wearing feathers, beads, and bells, and decorating themselves in rainbow makeup. Many reported feeling a change of consciousness during the event, which one person there described as "a four day acid trip – without the acid!". On the final night of the gathering, they put together a performance of the Symmetricon, an invention of Burnside's, while Hay gave a farewell speech.

=== Growth, friction, and split: 1979–80 ===
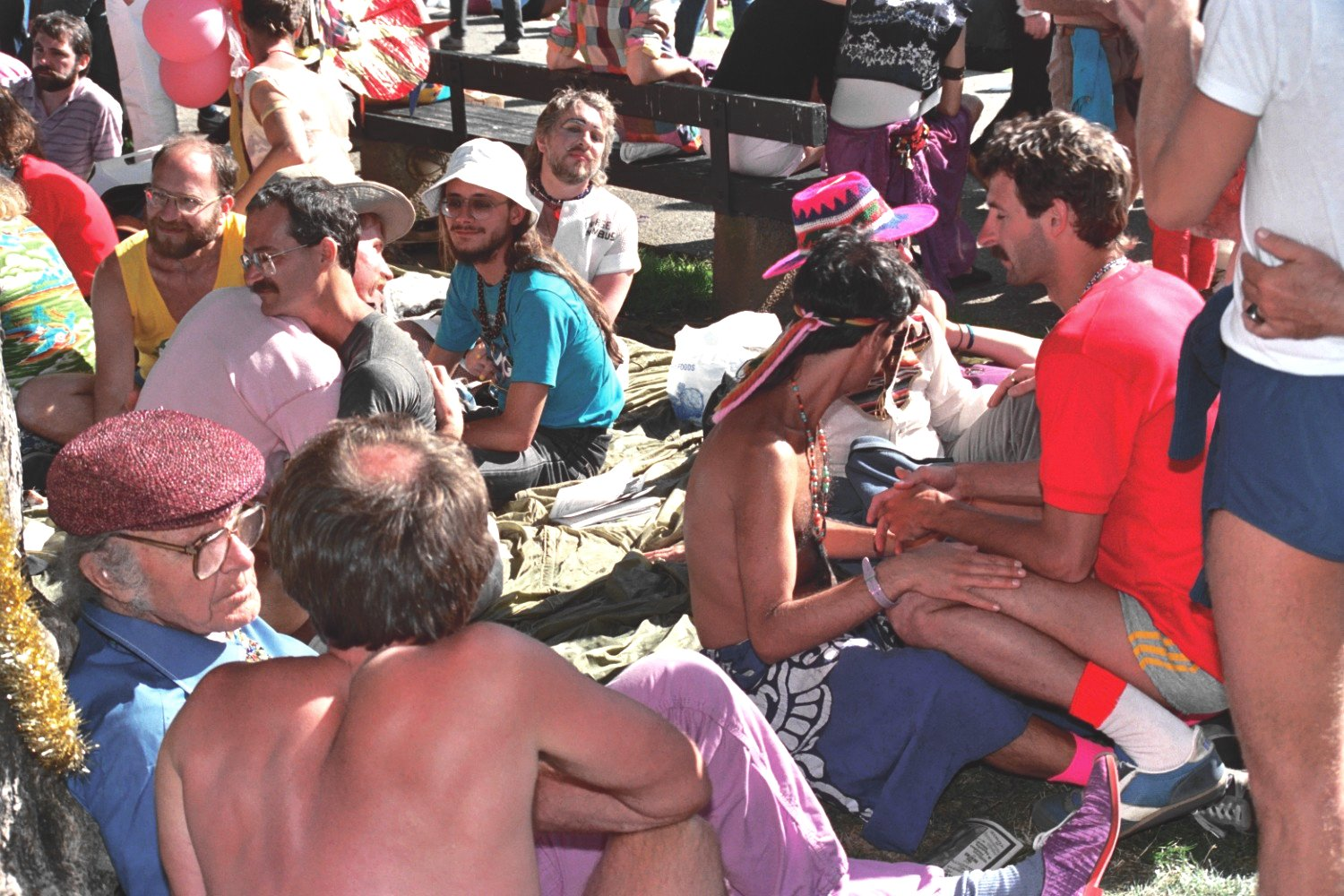
A Faerie gathering in 1986, with Hay in bottom left corner

After Hay and the others returned to Los Angeles, they received messages of thanks from various participants, many of whom asked when the next Faerie gathering would be. Hay decided to found a Faerie circle in Los Angeles that met at their house, which became known as "Faerie Central", devoting half their time to serious discussion and the other half to recreation, in particular English circle dancing. As more joined the circle, they began meeting in West Hollywood's First Presbyterian Church and then the olive grove atop the hill at Barnsdall Park; however they found it difficult to gain the same change of consciousness that had been present at the rural gathering. The group began to discuss what the Faerie movement was developing into; Hay encouraged them to embark on political activism, using Marxism and his Subject-SUBJECT consciousness theory as a framework for bringing about societal change. Others however wanted the movement to focus on spirituality and exploring the psyche, lambasting politics as part of "the straight world". Another issue of contention was over what constituted a "Faerie"; Hay had an idealized image of what someone with "gay consciousness" thought and acted like, and turned away some prospective members of the Circle because he disagreed with their views. One prospective member, the gay theatre director John Callaghan, joined the circle in February 1980, but was soon ejected by Hay after he voiced concern about hostility toward heterosexuals among the group.

The second Faerie gathering took place in August 1980 in Estes Park near Boulder, Colorado. Twice as long and almost twice as large as the first, it became known as Faery Woodstock. It also exhibited an increasing influence from the U.S. Pagan movement, as Faeries incorporated elements from Evans' Witchcraft and the Gay Counterculture and Starhawk's The Spiral Dance into their practices. At that gathering, Dennis Melba'son presented a shawl that he had created with a crocheted depiction of the Northwest European Iron Age deity Cernunnos on it; the shawl became an important symbol of the Faeries, and would be sent from gathering to gathering over subsequent decades. There, Hay publicly revealed the founding trio's desire for the creation of a permanent residential Faerie community, where they could grow their own crops and thus live self-sustainably. This project would involve setting up a non-profit corporation to purchase property under a community land trust with tax-exempt status. They were partly inspired by a pre-existing gay collective in rural Tennessee, Short Mountain. The gathering was also attended by an increasing number of men from outside of America, particularly Canada, but also from Australia, Norway, France and Germany, many of whom returned to their countries of origin to establish Faerie communes, such as the Wellington Boot, Common Ground etc. in Australia.

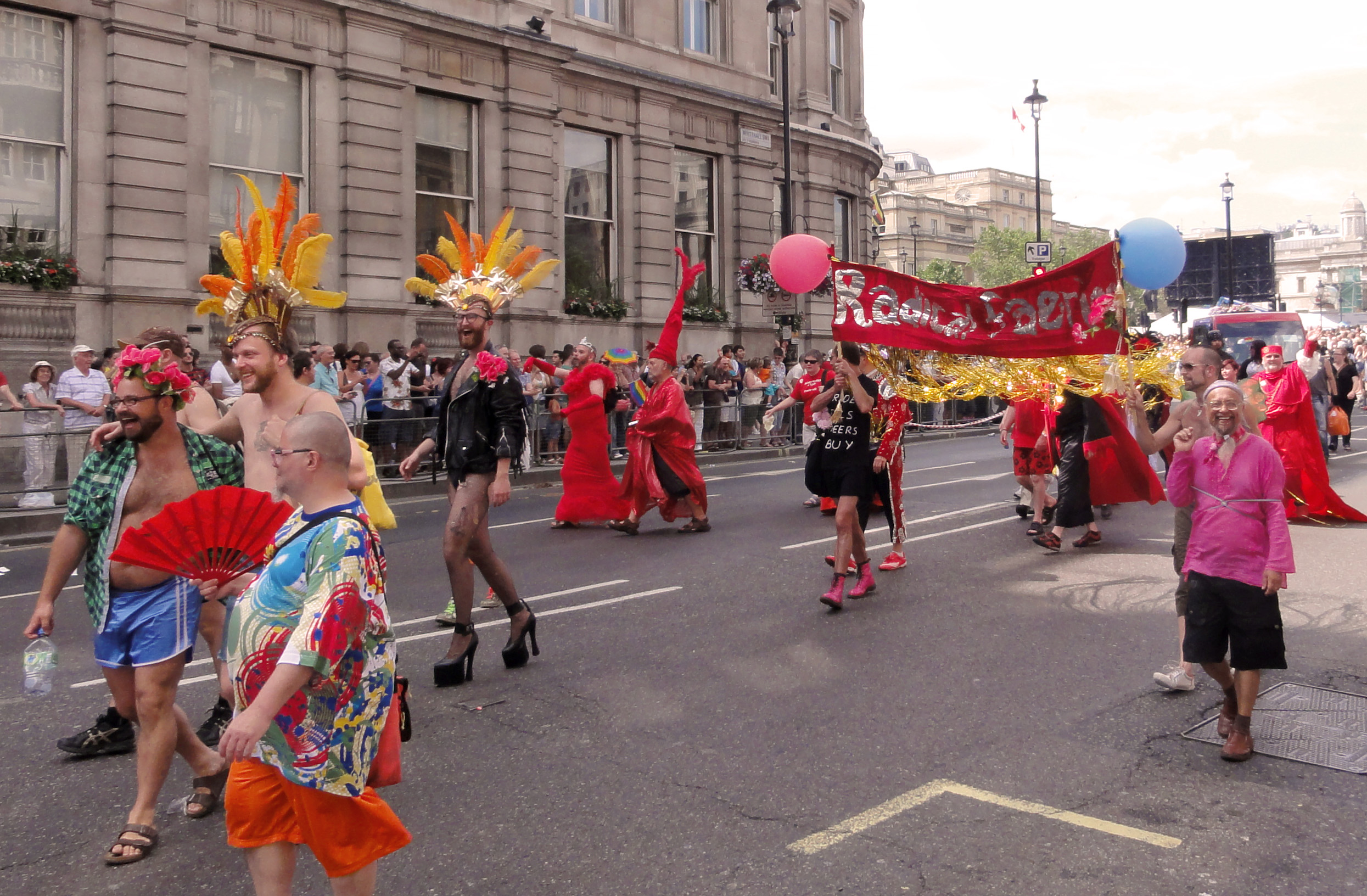
Radical Faeries with banner at 2010 London Gay Pride

There was some antagonism between Hay and Walker from the beginning of their venture, due to Walker's concern about addressing unconscious power issues, "the shadow," in his preferred Jungian psychological orientation. Walker saw analytical psychology as central to his world view and believed that it could be utilized to aid in the liberation of gay men, whereas Hay was suspicious and disdainful of it. As the Los Angeles Circle grew, Kilhefner also became annoyed with Hay over the latter's tendency to dominate conversations both in and out of the Circle, as well as his proselytizing attitude. Kilhefner came to agree with Walker about the seriousness of Hay's failure to address unconscious power issues. At the 1980 gathering, Walker, frustrated with Hay's dominating personality, formed the "Faerie Fascist Police" on the outskirts of the camp to combat "Faerie fascism" and "power-tripping" within the Faeries. He specifically targeted Hay: "I recruited people to spy on Harry and see when he was manipulating people, so we could undo his undermining of the scene."

At a winter 1980 gathering in southern Oregon designed to discuss acquiring land for a Faerie sanctuary, Walker brought his close friend, Chris Kilbourne, and two other members, Sai and David, brought Ion. Hay, Kilhefner and Burnside were outraged at being challenged with having a closed circle and acted as if Kilbourne and Ion did not exist, a terribly difficult situation for them, especially as ten people were holed-up in a small house in the pouring rain, for six days. Finally, Kilbourne couldn't take the hypocrisy of the three leaders and confronted Harry about the power dynamics within the core circle. In the ensuing conflict, the core circle splintered. Plans for the land sanctuary stalled and a separate circle formed. The core circle made an attempt to reconcile, but at a meeting that came to be known as "Bloody Sunday", Kilhefner quit along with Walker, accusing Hay and Burnside of "power tripping". Walker and Kilhefner formed a new Los Angeles-based gay spiritual and psychological group called Treeroots which promoted a form of grassroots gay consciousness and ceremonial magic, coupled with a Jungian psychological perspective to assist in the healing and liberation of gay men.

However, despite the division among its founders, the Radical Faerie movement continued to grow, largely as a result of its anti-authoritarian structure, with many participants being unaware of the conflict regarding disowned power agendas. Walker and Kilbourne also continued to be involved in Southern California gatherings for many years, and began offering workshops on the problem of the Gay Shadow, with titles such as "Gay Soul-Making" and "Coming Out Inside", as well as on gay men's dream analysis. These workshops stirred up controversy due to some participants' difficulty with their message of gay spirit as a sacred alchemical process involving confrontation with and transformation of insidious internalized homophobia. Kilhefner and Walker had formed Treeroots specifically to address such matters in a new organizational effort. Treeroots to this day continues to sponsor events. Kilhefner eventually resigned from Treeroots in 1994 because he disagreed with Walker's insistence that the organizers honestly address their psychological issues with each other, while Kilhefner was adamant about keeping his issues private.

An effort to exclude Walker and Kilbourne from all Radical Faerie gatherings was controversially attempted in the early 1990s and, to this day, some anti-psychological individuals, now including Kilhefner as well, attempt to completely erase Walker from his pivotal role in the original conceptualizing and organizing efforts of the Radical Faeries, and also attempt to erase their own historical participation in those pro-psychological efforts. Hay himself continued to be welcomed at gatherings, coming to be seen as an elder statesman in some peoples' eyes, and a patronized mascot in others.

In 1998, in an ironic reversal toward Walker's position, Hay finally acknowledged in the gay paper Frontiers that his focus had shifted to "concentrating on removing the self-loathing that most gay men find themselves born into," that most gay men are "saturated with," and which is "the big thing that's facing us all at the present time."

While the Radical Faeries are often associated with subversion of gender norms, there is a surprisingly complex relationship to their masculinity and femininity. Using fieldwork and queer theory, Peter Hennen argues that although Radical Faeries deploy drag and embrace a New Age spirituality that challenges heteronormative standards, masculinity maintains a privileged status within many of the Radical Faerie spaces. This complexity becomes a focal point in Faerie disputes and discourse. Sometimes participants would even reaffirm their identity as men in drag, as noted in one Faeries’ declaration, who preferred to remain anonymous, “We are men, and no matter how you slice it, we’re men…You are still a boy in a dress.” Rather than providing a straightforward challenge to the dominating masculinity, Radical Faerie practice can simultaneously undermine and reinforce elements of mainstream gender ideology. This effect demonstrates that, even with a counterculture queer community, deep-seated cultural assumptions about gender and masculinity remain influential, and prevail to shape rituals, language, and power dynamics.

While the Radical Faeries are widely known for blending counterculture activism and queer spirituality, there has been a long-standing and internal debate about gender inclusion within their movement. Specifically, it’s been argued whether or not gatherings should be open to all genders or reserved exclusively for gay men. According to ethnographic researchers, the result of this debate is only what can be described as “universal versus provincial boundaries.” Some Radical Faerie communities welcome women, transgender, bisexual, and nonbinary people, where others defend ‘gay men only’ spaces as spiritually essential. Gender-diverse participants have reported both open support and exclusion. Their experiences of sexism and boundaries reflect deeper tensions about the meaning of Faerie identity and the ideals that the community holds. This process of making boundaries is not just theoretical, but plays out in different policies, in mixed gender and men only events, and has led to a declining participation among those who feel unwelcome. These evolving debates mean that the definition of who can be a Radical Faerie, and what the movement means, remains deeply contested among its members.

=== Since 1981 ===
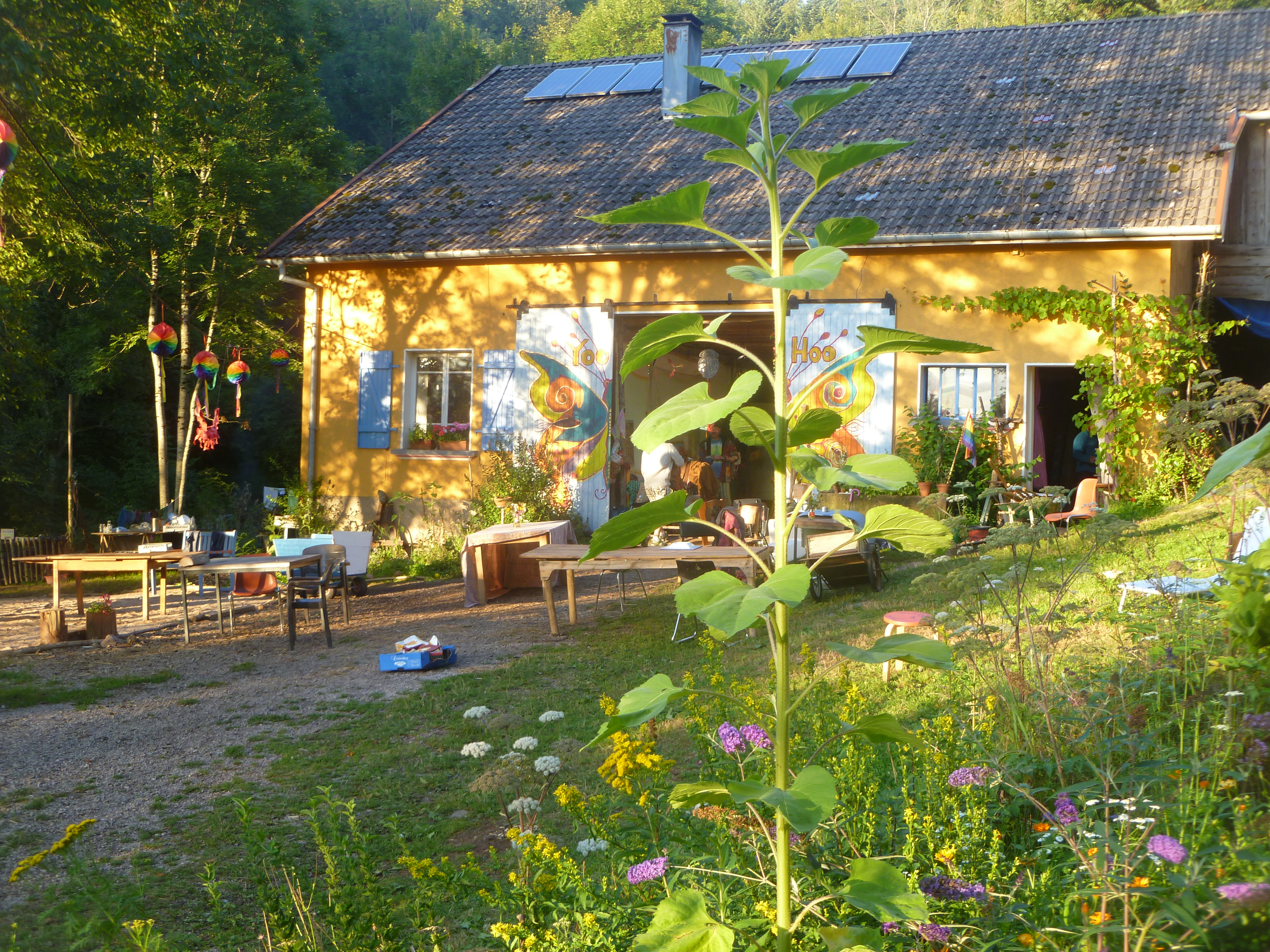
The Folleterre Faerie Sanctuary in France

The first Faerie gathering in Australia was held in January 1981, at Tony Newman's Whole Earth Dream Farm near Ourimbah (established in 1974), inspired by the RFD reporting of the second Faerie gathering (in Colorado), and held in conjunction with Sydney's Gay Men's Rap, although this first gathering did not generate any ongoing Faerie activity.

A subsequent, and unconnected, Faerie gathering was held on 9–12 April 1982, at Mandala, a gay spiritual commune established near Uki in the Northern Rivers region of New South Wales. This commune was established in late 1973 by David Johnstone as a harmonious place for gay men, and their friends, to live. This second gathering included Faeries who had attended the second and third gatherings in the United States, and led to continued growth of the Radical Faeries in Australia, and repeated attempts to establish Faerie communes, such as Common Ground (Clarence River Valley), and eventually the ongoing commune Faerieland, near Nimbin.

Guided by Mica Kindman, Lloyd Fair, Cass Brayton, and Will Roscoe, the San Francisco Faerie Circle had formed a non-profit corporation under the name of NOMENUS (varyingly interpreted as "No Men Us", "No Menace", and "No Menus"), supported by Hay. They raised enough money to put a down payment on some land from a 1983 gathering in Napa, however decided against forming a self-sufficient community, instead choosing to purchase a smaller piece of land that could be stationed by a few caretakers and which could house regular gatherings. In 1987 they purchased Magdalene Farm – an 80-acre property near Grant's Pass, Oregon – from George Jalbert, who had unsuccessfully hoped to establish his own rural gay commune there over the preceding decade.

Throughout the 1980s the Radical Faerie movement had spread out from the United States and had gatherings in Canada, Australia, the United Kingdom, and Italy, as well as Folleterre in France.

Black Leather Wings is an organization for spiritual gay leather folk affiliated with the Radical Faeries. The San Francisco South of Market Leather History Alley includes bronze boot prints that honor 28 people important to the local leather communities, including Mark Thompson, a co-founder of Black Leather Wings, and Alexis Sorel, a Black Leather Wings member.

== Sanctuaries and gatherings ==
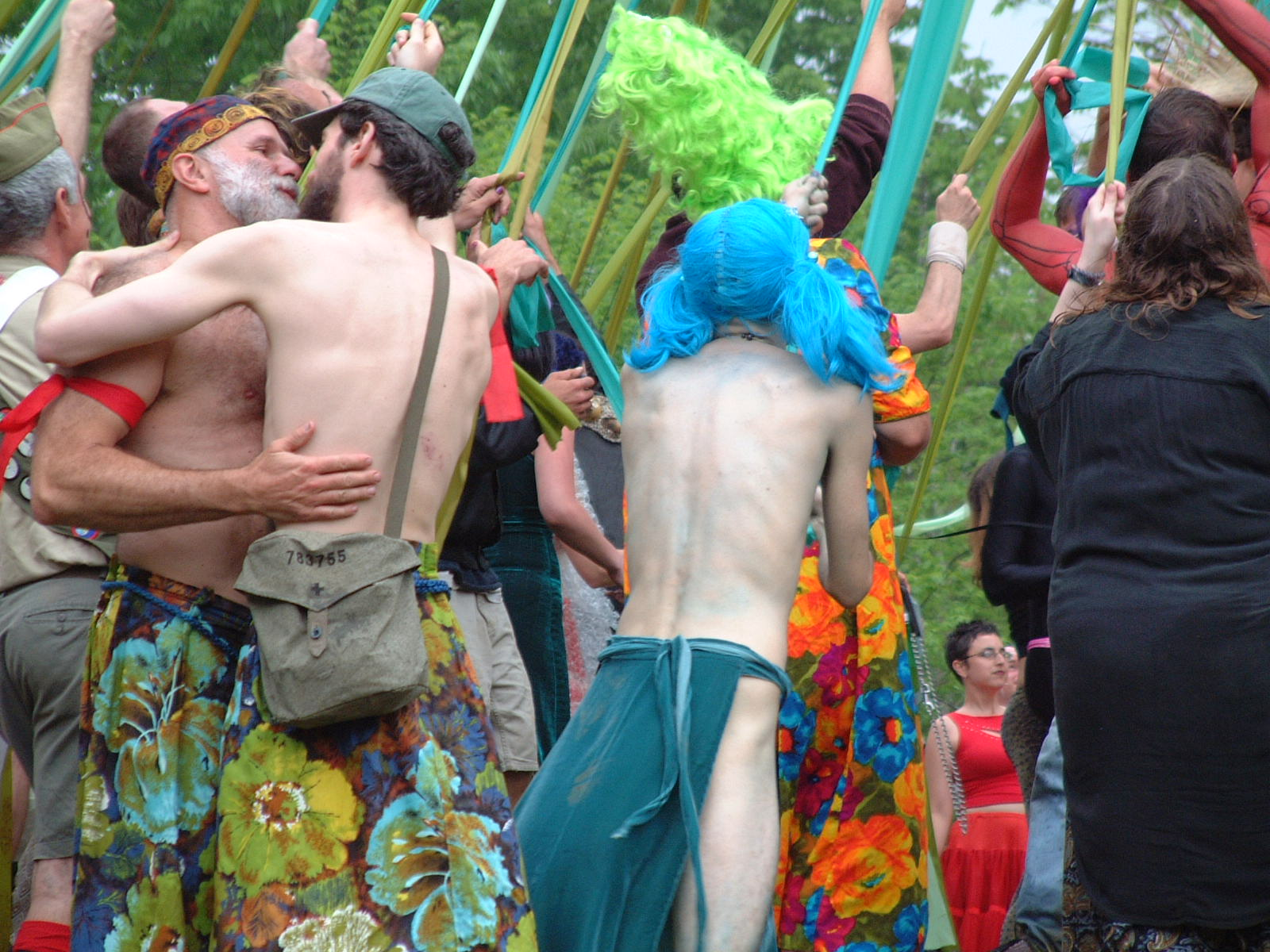
The Kiss - 2003

Rural land or urban buildings where Faeries come together to live a communal life are called sanctuaries, which may host gatherings from time to time.

Faerie sanctuaries adapt rural living and environmentally sustainable ways of using modern technologies as part of creative expression. Radical Faerie communities are sometimes inspired by secular pagan or secular spiritual practices, especially those that incorporate genderqueer sensibilities.

Sanctuaries and gatherings are generally open to all, though specific gatherings may focus on the particular spiritual experience of man-loving men co-creating temporary autonomous zones.

Over the decades, Radical Faeries have established sanctuaries across North America, Europe, Australia, and more. Major residential Faerie sanctuaries in the United States include Short Mountain Sanctuary in Tennessee, Wolf Creek Sanctuary in Oregon, and Zuni Mountain Sanctuary in New Mexico. These properties were acquired as places for faeries to explore queer spirituality, community, and alternative living, often operating as intentional communities governed by consensus and hosting seasonal events such as Beltane and Samhain gatherings. Sanctuaries exist in diverse geographies, from the forests of the Pacific Northwest to the deserts of the Southwest, and have inspired further sites in Australia, the U.K., France, Thailand, and elsewhere, with Folleterre in France notable as Europe's first faerie sanctuary.

== Cultural influence ==
Participants at the 1979 Faerie gathering helped establish the Sisters of Perpetual Indulgence in San Francisco that same year.

In the late 1990s Faeries sustained the New York City Drag March, an activist event held the Friday before the corporate-sponsored NYC Pride March. The Drag March began in 1994 in response to attempts to ban leather and drag during festivities marking the 25th anniversary of the Stonewall riots.

The Queer as Folk episode "Stand Up for Ourselves" features a storyline where the characters Emmett and Michael attend a rural gathering to discover their "inner Faerie."

Faeries were a contributing influence to the 2006 John Cameron Mitchell film Shortbus, including the casting of performance artist Justin Vivian Bond.

Taylor Mac invokes "Radical Faerie realness ritual" during performances.

== See also ==
- LGBTQ themes in mythology
- Religion and LGBTQ people
- Running Water Farm, site of several Faerie gatherings between 1978 and 1989
- Subject-SUBJECT consciousness, concept proposed by Harry Hay
- Modern pagan views on LGBTQ people
- Pink capitalism

== Bibliography ==
- Walker, Mitch (Winter 1976), "Visionary Love: The Magickal Gay Spirit-Power", Gay Sunshine: A Journal of Gay Liberation (31). Republished in Thompson (1987).
- Mitchell, Larry (1977), The Faggots & Their Friends Between Revolutions, with drawings by Ned Asta, Calamus Books, ISBN 978-0-930762-00-1
- Evans, Arthur (1978), Witchcraft and the Gay Counterculture: A Radical View of Western Civilization and Some of the People It Has Tried to Destroy, Fag Rag Books, ISBN 0-915480-01-8
- Thompson, Mark, ed. (1987), Gay Spirit: Myth and Meaning, St. Martin's Press, ISBN 978-1-59021-024-6
- Conner, Randy P. (1993), Blossom of Bone: Reclaiming the Connections between Homoeroticism and the Sacred, HarperSanFrancisco, ISBN 0-06-250903-9
- Hennen, Peter (2008), Faeries, Bears, and Leathermen: Men in Community Queering the Masculine, University of Chicago Press, ISBN 978-0-226-32727-3
- Thompson, Mark, ed. (2011). The Fire in Moonlight: Stories from the Radical Faeries, 1975-2010. with Richard Neely (Osiris) and Bo Young, foreword by Will Roscoe. White Crane Books. ISBN 978-1-59021-338-4.
- Catell, Gunny (2015). Rise like a Faerie (in German). Vienna: Eigenverlag. ISBN 978-3-200-03856-1.
- Catell, Gunny (2015). Zuhören. Listen Without Prejudice. Listen To The Earth (in German). Vienna: Eigenverlag. ISBN 978-3-200-06410-2.

Periodicals

- RFD magazine, often dubbed the Radical Faerie Digest
- White Crane, a journal of Gay Wisdom & Culture
