= Spiritual Conference for Radical Fairies =

The Spiritual Conference for Radical Fairies (Note: Hay and others switched to the alternate spelling of faeries after 1979 (Hay/Roscoe, p. 240).) was organized as a "call to gay brothers" by early gay rights advocates Harry Hay and Don Kilhefner. The 1979 conference was held over three days, coinciding with Labor Day weekend: 31 August–2 September. Over 200 participants gathered at the Sri Ram Ashram near Benson, Arizona to explore ideas for merging spirituality into gay liberation.

== History ==
The organizing group formed out of discussions between their members spanning 1973-1978. These discussions mixed the works of Edward Carpenter, Arthur Evans, Jungian psychology, and Hay's studies of Native American spirituality, on topics ranging from gay consciousness, gay mythos, and the evolving nature of gay subculture. By 1978, such discussions indicated the need for a retreat to focus more deeply on these topics. In the fall of 1978 Hay, Kilhefner, and Walker led a workshop at the Gay Academic Union at UCLA. This workshop broke from the conference's academic tone and instead led to a group discussion similar to what is now known as a "heart circle", a structure where people take it in turn to speak from the heart, without interruption. Throughout the summer of 1979, they developed and distributed what Hay termed a "Call", a flier to invite gay men to the retreat. The conference was held over the Labor Day weekend and attracted over two hundred participants. The success of the retreat inspired organizers and participants to thereafter coalesce under the moniker of the Radical Faeries. Participants at the 1979 conference were also integral in establishing the Sisters of Perpetual Indulgence later the same year.

== Sources ==
- Hay, Harry, with Will Roscoe (ed.) (1996). Radically Gay: Gay Liberation in the Words of its Founder. Boston: Beacon Press. ISBN 0-8070-7080-7.
- Shively, Charley. "Harry Hay". Collected in Bronski, Michael (consulting editor) (1997). Outstanding Lives: Profiles of Lesbians and Gay Men. New York, Visible Ink Press. ISBN 1-57859-008-6.
- Timmons, Stuart (1990). The Trouble With Harry Hay. Boston, Alyson Publications. ISBN 1-55583-175-3.
