= Teleidoscope =

Optical toy

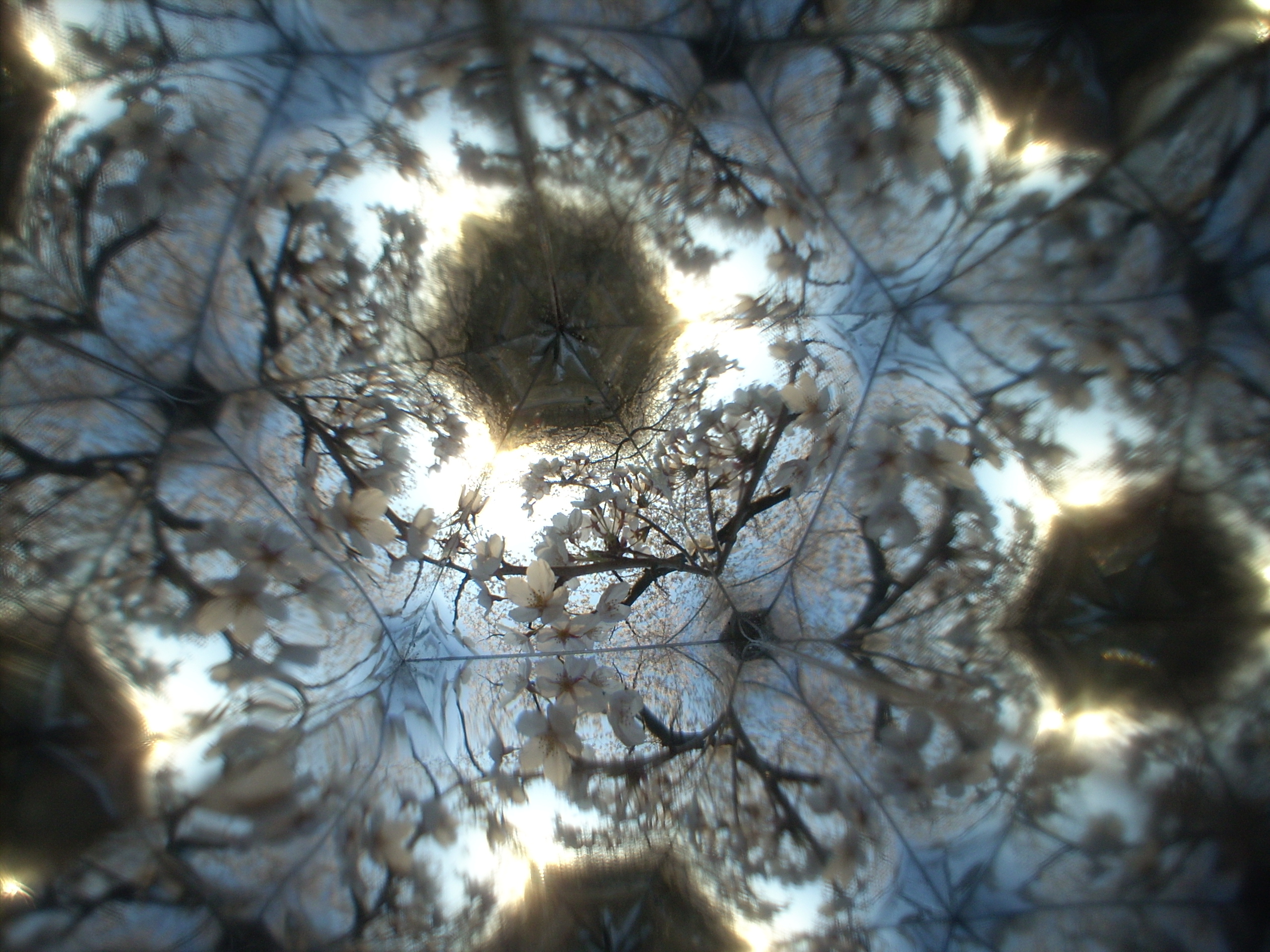
Tree branches seen through a teleidoscope

A teleidoscope is a kind of kaleidoscope, with a lens and an open view, so it can be used to form kaleidoscopic patterns from objects outside the instrument, rather than from items installed as part of it. Invented by John Burnside and Harry Hay, the patent was filed in 1970 and granted in 1972.

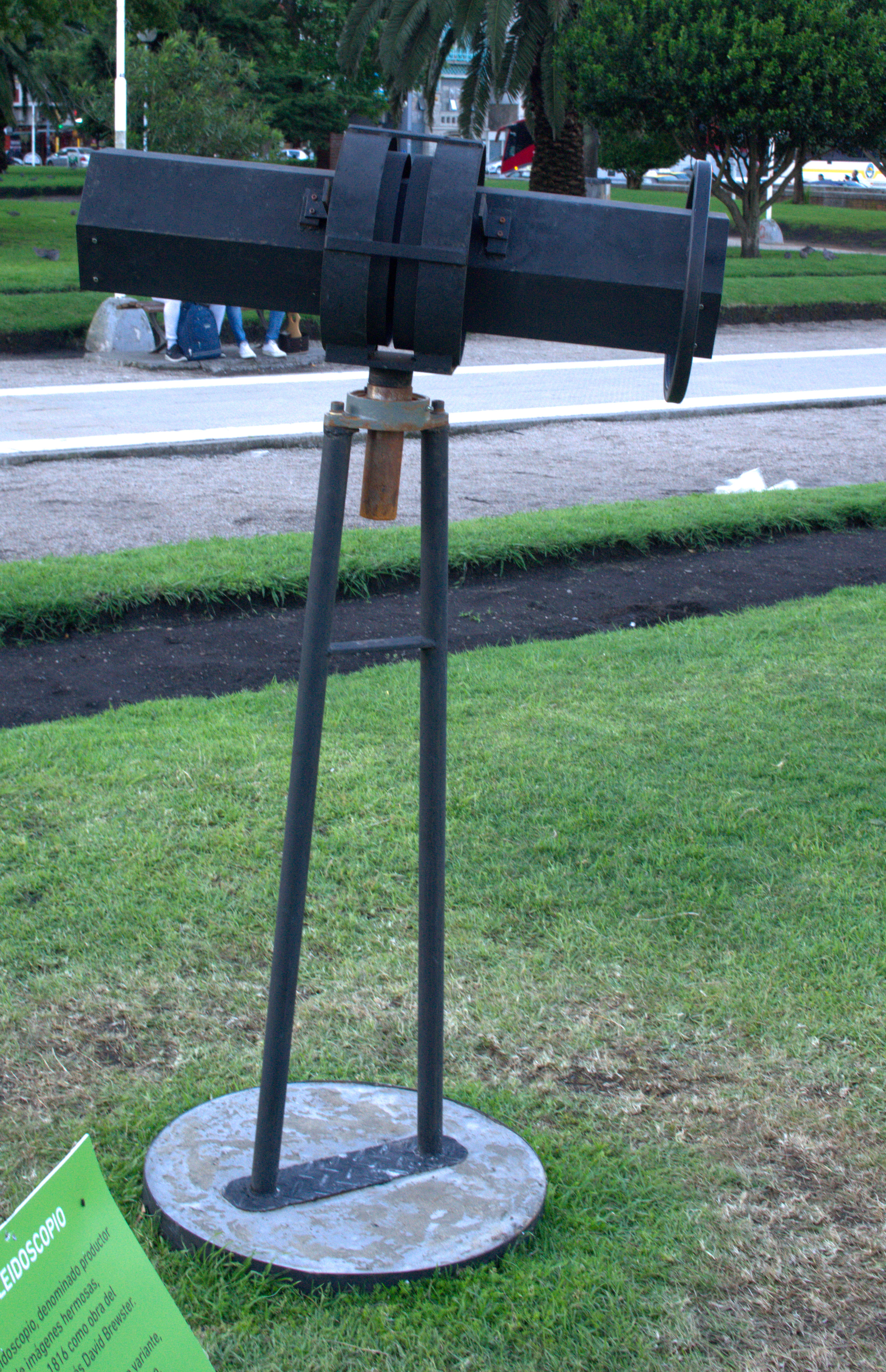
A large teleidoscope in a public park

The lens at the end of the tube is not an optical requirement, but protects the internals of the teleidoscope. A spherical ball lens is often used. An advantage of using a sphere is that it will not press flat against the object being viewed, which would block all light and result in no image being seen.
