= John Burnside (inventor) =

American inventor (1916–2008)

- Born: John Lyon Burnside III; November 2, 1916; Seattle, Washington, U.S.
- Died: September 14, 2008 (aged 91); San Francisco, California, U.S.
- Occupations: Gay rights activist, Inventor
- Spouse: Edith Sinclair
- Partner: Harry Hay (1963–2002)

John Lyon Burnside III (November 2, 1916 – September 14, 2008) was an American inventor and gay rights activist, known for inventing the teleidoscope, darkfield kaleidoscope, and the Symmetricon. Because he rediscovered the math behind kaleidoscope optics, makers of optically correct kaleidoscopes sold in the United States paid him royalties for decades. Burnside was the life partner of Harry Hay from 1962 until Hay's death in 2002. Burnside was living in San Francisco, at the time of his death on September 14, 2008, from complications of brain cancer.

== Early life and education ==
Burnside was born on November 2, 1916, in Seattle. He was an only child, raised by his mother after his father abandoned the family. Being poor, she periodically placed her son in the care of orphanages.

Burnside served briefly in the United States Navy, and settled in Los Angeles in the 1940s. In 1944 he graduated from UCLA with a bachelor's in physics.

== California Kaleidoscopes ==
Burnside became an engineer for the aerospace industry, eventually working as a staff scientist for Lockheed. He remained passionate about optics. Burnside invented the teleidoscope, then started California Kaleidoscopes, or Cal Kal, in 1959 to produce his invention. The teleidoscope became popular after it was written up in the press, and Burnside's business became his primary source of income for the next decade.^{:209} Burnside and his wife Edith were business partners, and they were members of the company's board along with Burnside's mother and a lawyer.^{:210,212}

Burnside learned about One, Inc., a group centered around the popular gay magazine ONE, from two gay employees at his teleidoscope factory.^{:173,210} He began attending meetings in 1962, and met Harry Hay there.^{:210} As Burnside tried to navigate his relationship with Hay and his ongoing marriage to Edith, a common situation for American gay men before the 1970s, he hired Hay as production manager for California Kaleidoscopes.^{:211}

Burnside soon moved in with Hay and took an extended vacation with him over the holidays, where they met with leaders of Pojoaque to discuss moving California Kaleidoscope's factory there. After they returned, the board of California Kaleidoscopes, including Burnside's wife and mother, voted Burnside out of the company. Burnside and Hay locked themselves in the company office while Edith blocked them from the factory with the support of most of the company's employees.^{:211-212} Hay realized that the patent for the teleidoscope was only in Burnside's name, so he had Burnside sell him the patent for $1. This started negotiations between them and the rest of California Kaleidoscopes. After a year, Burnside regained control of the factory.^{:213}

== Gay rights activism ==
Burnside and Hay formed the Circle of Loving Companions in 1965, a group that promoted gay rights and gay love. They were the only two long-term members, although other members included their close friends like Stella Rush and Helen Sandoz, editors of The Ladder for the Daughters of Bilitis.^{:214}

In May 1966, Burnside and Hay were part of one of the earliest gay protest actions, a 15-car motorcade through Downtown Los Angeles protesting the military's exclusion of homosexuals. Burnside made designs to secure four-foot-tall boxes to the tops of the cars, and Hay sketched the designs for distribution, with both of them performing most of the planning and recruiting for the event.^{:221} The pair appeared on Melvin Belli's program the day after the motorcade to argue that gay people should reject negative depictions of themselves and create their own definitions.^{:222} In 1967, the pair appeared as a gay couple on The Joe Pyne Show.

During the late 1960s, the Circle of Loving Companions attended renaissance fairs, with Burnside selling kaleidoscopes and Hay sharing handouts. Burnside and Hay also regularly attended local meetings and conferences of the Council on Religion and the Homophile.^{:223} They hired many gay people and non-conformists at California Kaleidoscopes, and used the factory to host meetings and publications for gay liberation activists.^{:224} Burnside and Hay also grew involved with the Committee for Traditional Indian Land and Life during the 1960s, and used the factory for committee meetings.^{:225} They withdrew in 1969 after Hay felt uncomfortable with the Occupation of Alcatraz and heard about the assault of a friend and fellow activist.^{:227}

Burnside and Hay helped plan the first gay pride parade in Albuquerque, New Mexico in 1977. In 1979, the pair, together with Don Kilhefner and Mitchell L. Walker, founded the Radical Faeries.

== Personal life ==
Burnside knew he was gay by the time he was 14. However, after a bad sexual experience he decided to remain closeted and repress his sexuality, thinking the downsides of following his sexuality were worse. He married Edith Sinclair, a German immigrant, when he was 23. The pair had no children, and Burnside said the marriage was "not unhappy", but his personal life was "cursed".^{:210}

Burnside later met Harry Hay in 1963 at One, Inc. The two fell in love and became life partners. Burnside was still married to Sinclair when he met Hay, and he struggled to reconcile his marriage with his new relationship. Burnside initially invited Hay to stay with him and Sinclair at their house, but moved in with Hay after two months. After Burnside and Hay took an extended vacation together, Sinclair blocked him from returning to California Kaleidoscopes or accessing their shared assets. Burnside and Hay remained poor throughout 1965 until Hay and Burnside took the company back over the next year.^{:210-213}

Burnside and Hay became close friends with Silvia Richards and Craig Carpenter through their involvement with the Committee for Traditional Indian Land and Life.^{:225} In 1970, Burnside and Hay moved to Pueblo, New Mexico, and moved back to Los Angeles around a decade later.

In 1999, the couple moved to San Francisco. During the 1990s and 2000s, the Circle of Loving Companions took care of Burnside and Hay.

Burnside died Sunday, September 14, 2008, at the age of 91. His ashes, mixed with Hay's, were scattered in Nomenus Faerie Sanctuary in Wolf Creek, Oregon.

== Published obituaries ==
- Obituary on Los Angeles Times
- Obituary on Bay Area Reporter
- White Crane Blog
- Obituary on San Francisco Bay Times
- Gay City News obit
- Queensland News obit
