= Mark Thompson (author) =

American journalist and author

- Born: August 19, 1952; Monterey County, California, U.S.
- Died: August 23, 2016 (aged 64); Palm Springs, California, U.S.
- Education: San Francisco State University
- Occupations: Journalist, author
- Spouse: Malcolm Boyd

Mark Thompson (August 19, 1952 – August 23, 2016) was an American journalist and author. He was a senior editor for The Advocate and the author of several books about LGBT culture. He received the Pioneer Award from the Lambda Literary Foundation in 2008.

== Early life ==
Mark Thompson was born on the Monterey Peninsula in California. He graduated from San Francisco State University, where he studied journalism. While in college, he became a gay activist and joined the Radical Faeries. He was also the co-founder of the Gay Students Coalition with Professor John Paul De Cecco as the faculty advisor, and started a gay newspaper on campus.

== Career ==
Thompson became a journalist for The Advocate, the main LGBT magazine in the United States, in 1975. For two decades, he wrote many articles about gay activism and the responses to the HIV/AIDS epidemic. He also conducted many interviews, including gay British painter David Hockney and gay politician Harvey Milk.

Thompson was the author of four books about gay culture, including a history of The Advocate. He also wrote his memoir. Additionally, he was an amateur photographer, and he exhibited his photography of Harry Hay and others in San Francisco.

Thompson was the recipient of the Pioneer Award from the Lambda Literary Foundation in 2008.

== Personal life ==
Thompson was married to Malcolm Boyd, an Episcopal priest who was 30 years older than he and predeceased him. They met in 1984 and married in 2013. They lived in Silver Lake, a neighborhood of Los Angeles, California. Boyd's role as spiritual leader inspired Thompson to explore his own spirituality. Mark, in the course of writing books on queer spirituality, began to see and believe that gay people had a "magical, deep, mysterious quality". This viewpoint, along with the emotional support of his husband, invigorated his sense of self esteem and the belief that given the choice he would "never have chosen to be any other way" than gay. It was Thompson's hope that his work would serve to help other queer people with their spiritual struggles.

Thompson joined the Radical Faeries while in college. He was a cofounder of Black Leather Wings, an organization for spiritual gay leather folk, a mostly pagan group affiliated with the Radical Faeries.

Thompson had HIV/AIDS. In an oral history interview with the Lavender Effect, Thompson described himself as "serial monogamous" at the time he contracted the virus, but admitted to having several boyfriends in a short period of time. He contracted the virus from one of them in 1979 or 1980. Many of his lovers died of the disease, as did his own brother, Kirk. Thompson states that his brother died in his arms in 1987, months before the first effective AIDS medications were released to the public.

Thompson died on August 23, 2016, in Palm Springs, California, where he moved after his husband's death. His cause of death was undetermined, but it was believed he fell or fainted due to illness or side effects from his medication.

== Tribute ==
Thompson was honored in 2017 along with other notables, named on bronze bootprints, as part of San Francisco South of Market Leather History Alley.

== Notable works ==
- Thompson, Mark (1987). Gay Spirit: Myth and Meaning. New York: St. Martin's Press. ISBN 9780312006006. OCLC 15196783.
- Thompson, Mark, ed. (1991). Leather Folk: Radical Sex, People, Politics, and Practice. New York: Alyson Publications. ISBN 9781555831875.
- Thompson, Mark (1994). Gay Soul: Finding the Heart of Gay Spirit and Nature. San Francisco, California: HarperSanFrancisco. ISBN 9780062510402. OCLC 30777045.
- Thompson, Mark (1994). Long Road to Freedom: The Advocate History of the Gay and Lesbian Movement. New York: St. Martin's Press. ISBN 9780312095369. OCLC 29704106.
- Thompson, Mark (1997). Gay Body: A Journey Through Shadow to Self. New York: St. Martin's Press. ISBN 9780312168537. OCLC 36930719.
- Thompson, Mark (2009). Advocate Days & Other Stories. Queer Mojo. ISBN 9781608640164.
- Thompson, Mark, ed. (2011). The Fire in Moonlight: Stories from the Radical Faeries 1971–2010. White Crane Books. ISBN 9781938246043.
