= Mitchell L. Walker =

American gay activist and Jungian psychologist

Mitchell Lynn Walker (born 1951) is an American gay activist and Jungian psychologist who has written many influential articles and books on gay-centered psychology.

== Biography ==
Walker enrolled at the University of California, Los Angeles where he saw a therapist who tried to persuade him to not be gay. Although Walker rejected the therapist he did get "an invaluable introduction to inner work, to the techniques of dream analysis, and to other tools of psychological investigation." Walker transferred to the Berkeley campus and majored in psychology. He became more outspoken on gay issues and became one of the first to join the Berkeley Free Clinic's Gay Men Collective. After graduation he worked on a master's-level in psychology at San Francisco's Lone Mountain College focussing on same-sex love from Jung's "archetypal perspective" using the basis that archetypes are "primal indwelling sources after which behavior is patterned and images are perceived." In 1974 Walker had a realization that same-sex love was archetypal, not "a mere accident or adaption," answering the question if one was born gay or does gayness come from social experience. His revelation led to his master's thesis "discussing the then unheard-of topic of gay depth psychology."

Walker was the first openly gay writer to be published in the formal Jungian literature, for his paper, "The Double: An Archetypal Configuration," appeared in Spring in 1976. followed by "Jung and Homophobia," published in Spring in 1991. He is also the author of Men Loving Men: A Gay Sex Guide & Consciousness Book (Gay Sunshine Press, 1977/1994) - which was involved in an obscenity-importing case in England and Canada – and Visionary Love: A Spirit Book of Gay Mythology and Transmutational Faerie (Treeroots Press, 1980).

In 1979, Walker co-created with activists Harry Hay, John Burnside, and Don Kilhefner the first gay-centered spiritual movement, the Radical Faeries, a loosely affiliated, worldwide network and counter-cultural movement seeking to reject hetero-imitation and redefine queer identity through spirituality.

In 1982, after he quit the Radical Faeries, Walker and Don Kilhefner founded Treeroots, a non-profit educational organization to address the psychological dimension of gay liberation. The organization has sponsored workshops and lectures, and most recently, the Institute for Uranian Psychoanalysis, which provided training in gay-centered psychological theory and practice.

In 1987 Walker received a PhD in psychology with the dissertation, A Uranian Conjunction: The Individual Model of C. G. Jung as Applied to Gay Men. He has continued lecturing, teaching and running a private practice in Los Angeles.

== Selected works ==
- The Uranian Soul: A Gay-Centered Jungian Psychology Of Male Homosexual Personhood For a New Era of Gay Liberation Politics With Universal Implicational Import
- "Gay-Centered Inner Work." White Crane: A Journal Exploring Gay Men's Spirituality, 48, Spring 2001.
- "Disclosing Shadow to Self: The Next Stage of Gay Liberation." White Crane: A Journal Exploring Gay Men's Spirituality, 41, Summer 1999.
- The Revolutionary Psychology of Gay-Centeredness in Men: Three Short Essays.
- "The Archetype of Gay-Centeredness." White Crane: A Journal Exploring Gay Men's Spirituality, 37, Summer 1998.
- "Coming out inside: An interview with Mitch Walker." In M. Thompson (ed.), Gay Soul: Finding the Heart of Gay Spirit and Nature.
- Walker, Mitch (1977). Men Loving Men: A Gay Sex Guide and Consciousness Book. Gay Sunshine Press. ISBN 9780917342523.
- "Jung and Homophobia." Spring 51, A Journal of Archetype and Culture, 1991.
- "Gay Soul Making: Coming Out Inside." In M. Thompson (ed.), Gay Spirit: Myth and Meaning.
- "Visionary Love: The Magickal Gay Spirit-Power." In M. Thompson (ed.), Gay Spirit: Myth and Meaning.
- Visionary Love: A Spirit Book of Gay Mythology and Transmutational Faerie
- "The Double: An Archetypal Configuration." Spring 1976: An Annual of Archetypal Psychology and Jungian Thought
