= Toby Johnson =

American novelist and writer in the field of gay spirituality

- Born: 1945 (age 80–81); San Antonio, Texas, U.S.
- Education: California Institute of Asian Studies
- Occupations: Novelist; writer
- Writing career
- Genre: Gay spirituality
- Website: www.tobyjohnson.com

Toby Johnson (born 1945 in San Antonio, Texas) is an American novelist and writer in the field of gay spirituality.

== Life ==
After leaving seminary in 1970, Johnson moved to San Francisco and lived in the Bay Area throughout the 1970s. While a student at the California Institute of Asian Studies (later renamed the California Institute of Integral Studies), from which he received a graduate degree in Comparative Religion and a doctorate in Counseling Psychology, Johnson was on staff at the Mann Ranch Seminars, a Jungian-oriented summer retreat program. There he befriended religion scholar Joseph Campbell.

Johnson authored three novels: Plague: A Novel About Healing, Secret Matter, and Getting Life in Perspective. Plague, produced by small gay-interest publisher Alyson Publications, was one of the first novels to treat AIDS through fiction. Secret Matter, a speculative, romantic comedy about truth-telling and gay identity featuring a retelling of the Genesis myth with a gay-positive outcome, won a Lambda Literary Award in 1990 and in 1999 was a nominee to the Gay Lesbian Science-Fiction Hall of Fame, the first year of the award. He collaborated with historian, anthropologist Walter L. Williams on the novel Two Spirits: A Story of Life With the Navajo. And co-edited, with Steve Berman, publisher of Lethe Press, an anthology of gay-positive stories, Charmed Lives: Gay Spirit in Storytelling.

He is also author of Gay Spirituality: The Role of Gay Identity in the Transformation of Human Consciousness and Gay Perspective: Things Our Homosexuality Tells Us about the Nature of God and the Universe, which explains how homosexuality can lead to a re-evaluation of people's role in the universe.

From 1996 to 2003, Johnson was editor/publisher of White Crane Journal, a periodical focusing on gay men's spirituality. As of 2012, he worked as a literary editor with Lethe Press.

His papers are held at the Happy Foundation, San Antonio, Texas.

== Bibliography ==
- Gay Perspective: Things Our Homosexuality Tells Us about the Nature of God and the Universe Peregrine Ventures, 2003, ISBN 978-1727348446
- Gay Spirituality: The Role of Gay Identity in the Transformation of Human Consciousness Peregrine Ventures, 2000, 2010, ISBN 9781727318975
- Secret Matter. Peregrine Ventures, 2005, ISBN 9781727179422 . This is a science fiction novel, set in San Francisco.
- Getting Life in Perspective Peregrine Ventures 1991, 2010, ISBN 9781727097023
- Plague: A Novel about Healing Alyson Books, 1987, 9781555831257, Republished as "The Fourth Quill" by Peregrine Ventures, 2014 ISBN 9781727066920
- Two Spirits: A Story of Life With the Navajo (With Walter L. Williams, PhD) Peregrine Ventures, 2006, ISBN 9781088961063
- The Myth of the Great Secret: A Search for Spiritual Meaning in the Face of Emptiness William Morrow and Company, 1981, ISBN 9780688007812
- The Myth of the Great Secret (2nd Edition): An Appreciation of Joseph Campbell Celestial Arts, 1991, ISBN 9780890876589
- In Search of God in the Sexual Underworld William Morrow and Company, 1983, 9780688020460
- Finding Your Own True Myth: What I Learned from Joseph Campbell: The Myth of the Great Secret III Peregrine Ventures, 2018, ISBN 9781546521075
- Finding God in the Sexual Underworld: The Journey Expanded Peregrine Ventures, 2020, ISBN 9798558467628

== As editor ==
- Charmed Lives: Gay Spirit in Storytelling (co-edited with Steve Berman) (2006). The inaugural title in the White Crane Wisdom Series, this anthology of inspirational essays and short fiction for gay men earned Johnson a Lambda Literary Award nomination.

== See also ==
- LGBT rights in Texas
