= White Crane Journal =

United States magazine

White Crane Journal was a quarterly magazine for exploring and enhancing gay wisdom, spirituality, and culture, published from 1989 to 2010. It was a non-profit publication supported entirely by the subscriptions of its readers. It was headquartered in San Francisco.

== History ==
The White Crane Newsletter was created by Robert Barzan, a former Jesuit priest, in the Summer of 1989, and later renamed the White Crane Journal. The magazine's initial goal was to explore gay spirituality. Barzan published the journal for seven years.

In 1996, Barzan passed the journal on to Toby Johnson and became publisher emeritus. Johnson published White Crane Journal for seven years, converting it to a digital format. Johnson, in turn, handed over publishing responsibilities to Bo Young, previously a poetry editor and associate editor for the quarterly.

Bo Young invited Dan Vera share the work of publishing White Crane, where they intended to continue a forum of discussion and sharing in the 21st century in the spirit of the Heart Circles they learned from Harry Hay, where they met.

== Final status ==
The journal appears to have ceased publication with White Crane number 81, the 20th Anniversary issue, released 4 January 2010.

The journal was published by the White Crane Institute, which also published books under the White Crane Books imprint. The White Crane Institute website has archived samples and table of contents from issues 31–58 (Winter 1997 – Fall 2003), and full copies of issues 69–81 (September 2006 – January 2010). (Note: The last issue available online as of 29 August 2018 was number 81.)
