= Los Angeles LGBT Center =

Community center in Los Angeles, California

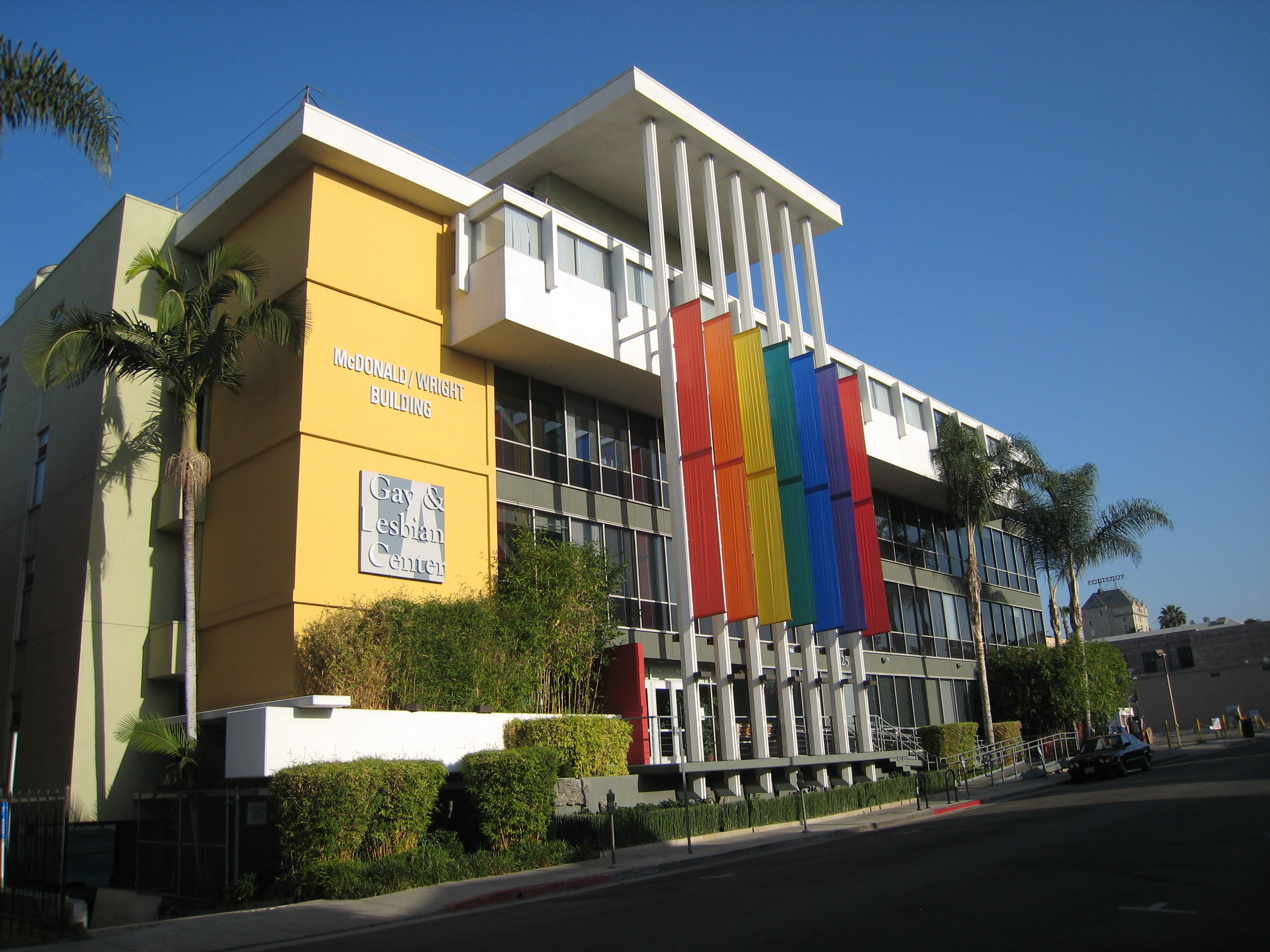
- The McDonald/Wright building in Hollywood, California, one location of the Los Angeles LGBT Center
- Formation: 1969; 57 years ago
- Founder: Don Kilhefner, Morris Kight
- Type: Nonprofit organization
- Tax ID no.: 95-3567895
- Legal status: 501(c)(3)
- Location: Los Angeles, California, U.S.
- Coordinates: 34.100528°N 118.332728°W
- Chief executive officer: Joe Hollendoner
- Co-chair: Susan Feniger
- Co-chair: Frank D. Pond
- Subsidiaries: McCadden Campus LLC, AMR Campus QALICB Inc
- Employees: 1,050 (2021)
- Volunteers: 1,530 (2021)
- Website: www.lalgbtcenter.org
- Formerly called: The Gay Community Services Center, Los Angeles Gay and Lesbian Center

The Los Angeles LGBT Center (previously known as the Los Angeles Gay and Lesbian Center) is a provider of programs and services for lesbian, gay, bisexual and transgender people. The organization's work spans four categories, including health, social services, housing, and leadership and advocacy. The center is the largest facility in the world providing services to LGBT people.

== History ==
The center was founded in 1969, by gay and lesbian rights activists Morris Kight and Don Kilhefner, along with other activists. Originally called The Gay Community Services Center, the original center was located in an old Victorian house on Wilshire Boulevard and was the first nonprofit organization in America to have the word "gay" in its name. In 1998, the organization named its library the Judith Light Library after one of its benefactors, actress Judith Light. The current chief executive officer is Joe Hollendoner.

On October 2, 2010, the center became the recipient of a $13.3 million, five-year grant from the U.S. Department of Health and Human Services Administration for Children and Families in order to create a model program for LGBTQ youth in foster care. It was the largest-ever grant by the federal government to an LGBT organization.

In 2015, the organization partnered with Latino Equality Alliance to open Mi Centro, a culturally sensitive facility in the predominantly Latine Boyle Heights neighborhood.

In 2016, Holly Woodlawn's estate founded the Holly Woodlawn Memorial Fund for Transgender Youth at the center, in order to benefit some of the center's programs, including Trans Pride L.A., Trans* Lounge, Transgender Economic Empowerment Project, and trans health care services. Woodlawn was transgender herself."

In 2020, the organization opened Center South in Leimert Park to serve the neighborhood's predominantly African-American population.

As a crowd of more than 200 gathered outside a June 2023 Glendale Unified School District Board of Education meeting, the Los Angeles LGBT Center joined organizations such as GALAS LGBTQ+ Armenian Society, the Armenian American Action Network, and Southern California Armenian Democrats in voicing support for the school district's LGBTQ+ policies.

== Services ==
The center's website lists services, programs and activities they offer. These include youth, senior, transgender, survivor, medical, legal and housing services. They provide a number a programs including community & support groups, trainings and vocational programs, and they host various arts and events.

== Locations ==
The Los Angeles LGBT Center operates facilities in various Los Angeles locations:

- Anita May Rosenstein Campus – Santa Monica Blvd at McCadden Place (new HQ in 2019)
- McDonald/Wright Building – 1625 N. Schrader Boulevard, Los Angeles, CA 90028-6213
- The Village at Ed Gould Plaza (including Renberg Theater) - 1125 N. McCadden Place, Los Angeles, CA 90038
- The Center Weho – 8745 Santa Monica Boulevard, West Hollywood, CA 90069
- Triangle Square – 1602 Ivar Avenue, Los Angeles, CA 90028
- Mi Centro – 553 S. Clarence Street, Los Angeles, CA 90033
- Trans Wellness Center – 3055 Wilshire Boulevard, Suite 360, Los Angeles, CA 90010

== See also ==
- List of LGBT community centers
- Torie Osborn
- LGBT culture in Los Angeles
- Deep canvassing
