= Heteronormativity =

Concept asserting heterosexuality as the only social norm

Heteronormativity is the definition of heterosexuality as the normative human sexuality. It assumes that sexual and marital relations are most fitting between people of the opposite sex.

Heteronormativity creates and upholds a social hierarchy based on sexual orientation with the practice and belief that heterosexuality is deemed as the societal norm.

A heteronormative view, therefore, involves alignment of biological sex, sexuality, gender identity and gender roles. Heteronormativity has been linked to heterosexism and homophobia, and the effects of societal heteronormativity on lesbian, gay and bisexual individuals have been described as heterosexual or "straight" privilege.

== Etymology ==
Michael Warner popularized the term in 1991, in one of the first major works of queer theory. The concept's roots are in Gayle Rubin's notion of the sex/gender system and Adrienne Rich's notion of compulsory heterosexuality. From the outset, theories of heteronormativity included a critical look at gender; Warner wrote that "every person who comes to a queer self-understanding knows in one way or another that her stigmatization is intricated with gender. ... Being queer ... means being able, more or less articulately, to challenge the common understanding of what gender difference means." Lauren Berlant and Warner further developed these ideas in their seminal essay "Sex in Public":

Heteronormativity is more than ideology, or prejudice, or phobia against gays and lesbians; it is produced in almost every aspect of the forms and arrangements of social life: nationality, the state, and the law; commerce; medicine; and education; as well as in the conventions and affects of narrativity, romance, and other protected spaces of culture.

== Relation to marriage and the nuclear family ==
Modern family structures in the past and present vary from what was typical of the 1950s nuclear family. In the United States, the families of the second half of the 19th century and early 20th century were characterized by the death of one or both parents for many American children. In 1985, the United States is estimated to have been home to approximately 2.5 million post-divorce, stepfamily households containing children. During the late 1980s, almost 20% of families with children headed by a married couple were stepfamilies.

Over the past three decades, rates of divorce, single parenting, and cohabitation have risen precipitously. Nontraditional families (which diverge from "a middle-class family with a bread-winning father and a stay-at-home mother, married to each other and raising their biological children") constitute the majority of families in the United States and Canada today. Shared Earning/Shared Parenting Marriage (also known as Peer Marriage) where two heterosexual parents are both providers of resources and nurturers to children has become popular. Modern families may also have single-parent headed families which can be caused by divorce, separation, death, families who have two parents who are not married but have children, or families with same-sex parents. With artificial insemination, surrogate mothers, and adoption, families do not have to be formed by the heteronormative biological union of a male and a female.

The consequences of these changes for the adults and children involved are heavily debated. In a 2009 Massachusetts spousal benefits case, developmental psychologist Michael Lamb testified that parental sexual orientation does not negatively affect childhood development. "Since the end of the 1980s... it has been well established that children and adolescents can adjust just as well in nontraditional settings as in traditional settings," he argued. However, columnist Maggie Gallagher argues that heteronormative social structures are beneficial to society because they are optimal for the raising of children. Australian-Canadian ethicist Margaret Somerville argues that "giving same-sex couples the right to found a family unlinks parenthood from biology". Recent criticisms of this argument have been made by Timothy Laurie, who argues that both intersex conditions and infertility rates have always complicated links between biology, marriage, and child-rearing.

Heteronormative temporality, a subset of heteronormativity, posits that the ideal societal trajectory involves achieving heterosexual marriage as life's ultimate goal. This ideology imposes societal expectations that encourage individuals to conform to traditional roles within a nuclear family structure: seeking an opposite-sex partner, entering into heterosexual marriage, and raising children. Heteronormative temporality promotes abstinence-only until marriage. Many American parents adhere to this heteronormative narrative and teach it to their children. According to Amy T. Schalet, it seems that the bulk of parent-child sex education revolves around abstinence-only practices in the United States, but this differs in other parts of the world. Similarly, George Washington University Professor, Abby Wilkerson, discusses how the healthcare and medicinal industries reinforce the views of heterosexual marriage to promote heteronormative temporality. The concept of heteronormative temporality extends beyond heterosexual marriage to include a pervasive system where heterosexuality is seen as a standard, and anything outside of that realm is not tolerated. Wilkerson explains that it dictates aspects of everyday life such as nutritional health, socio-economic status, personal beliefs, and traditional gender roles.

== Transgressions ==
=== Lesbian, gay and bisexual people ===
According to cultural anthropologist Gayle Rubin, heteronormativity in mainstream society creates a "sex hierarchy" that graduates sexual practices from morally "good sex" to "bad sex". The hierarchy considers reproductive, monogamous sex between committed heterosexuals as "good", whereas any sexual act or individual who falls short of this standard is labeled as "bad". Specifically, this standard categorizes long-term committed gay couples and non-monogamous/sexually active gay individuals between the two poles.

Philosopher Judith Butler uses the concept of abjection to discuss how subjects considered normal depend on deviant subjects to define themselves. In heteronormativity, the stability of heterosexual and cisgender identities depends, in part, on the rejection of homosexual and transgender subjects. This connects to what Butler calls the heterosexual matrix, which is the cultural requirement for cohesion between biological sex, gender identity, and sexual desire.

=== Transgender people ===
Transgender people experience a mismatch between their gender identity and their assigned sex. Transgender is also an umbrella term because it includes trans men and trans women who may be binary or non-binary and also includes genderqueer people (whose identities are not exclusively masculine or feminine, but may, for example, be bigender, pangender, genderfluid, etc.). Some authors also believe that the trans umbrella includes transsexual people, who have transitioned through hormonal replacement therapy and sex reassignment surgery.

Other definitions include third-gender people as transgender or conceptualize transgender people as a third gender, and infrequently the term is defined very broadly to include cross-dressers.

Some transgender people seek sex reassignment therapy, and may not behave according to the gender role imposed by society. Some societies consider transgender behavior a crime worthy of capital punishment, including Saudi Arabia and many other nations. In some cases, gay or lesbian people were forced to undergo sex change treatments to "fix" their sex and gender in some European countries during the 20th century, and in South Africa in the 1970s and 1980s.

In some countries, including North American and European countries, certain forms of violence against transgender people may be tacitly endorsed when prosecutors and juries refuse to investigate, prosecute, or convict those who perform the murders and beatings. Other societies have considered transgender behavior as a psychiatric illness serious enough to justify institutionalization.

In medical communities with these restrictions, patients have the option of either suppressing transsexual behavior and conforming to the norms of their birth sex (which may be necessary to avoid social stigma or even violence) or by adhering strictly to the norms of their "new" sex in order to qualify for sex reassignment surgery and hormonal treatments. Attempts to achieve an ambiguous or "alternative" gender identity would not be supported or allowed. Sometimes sex reassignment surgery is a requirement for a legal sex change, and often "male" and "female" are the only choices available, even for intersex and non-binary people. For governments which allow only heterosexual marriages, official gender changes can have implications for related rights and privileges, such as child custody, inheritance, and medical decision-making.

=== Intersex people ===
Intersex people have biological characteristics that are ambiguously either male or female. If such a condition is detected, intersex people in most present-day societies are almost always assigned a normative sex shortly after birth. Surgery (usually involving modification to the genitalia) is often performed in an attempt to produce an unambiguously male or female body, with the parents'—rather than the individual's—consent. The child is then usually raised and enculturated as a cisgender heterosexual member of the assigned sex, which may or may not match their emergent gender identity throughout life or some remaining sex characteristics (for example, chromosomes, genes or internal sex organs).

Feminist critiques of the medical management of intersex infants—particularly John Money's "Optimal Gender of Rearing" model—expose how binary sex categories are socially imposed through norms. Scholars like Anne Fausto-Sterling, Suzanne Kessler, and Judith Butler highlighted how heteronormative and gendered ideals guided medical decisions.

== Analysis ==
Critics of heteronormative attitudes, such as Cathy J. Cohen, Michael Warner, and Lauren Berlant, argue that such attitudes are oppressive, stigmatizing, marginalizing of perceived deviant forms of sexuality and gender, and make self-expression more challenging when that expression does not conform to the norm. Heteronormativity describes how social institutions and policies reinforce the presumption that people are heterosexual and that gender and sex are natural binaries. Heteronormative culture privileges heterosexuality as normal and natural and fosters a climate where LGBT individuals are discriminated against in marriage, tax codes, and employment. Following Berlant and Warner, Laurie and Stark also argue that the domestic "intimate sphere" becomes "the unquestioned non‐place that anchors heteronormative public discourses, especially those concerning marriage and adoption rights".

Patrick McCreery, lecturer at New York University, argues that heteronormativity explains how gay people are stigmatized for socially "deviant" sexual practices that are often practiced by straight people as well, such as consumption of pornography or sex in public places. There are many studies of sexual orientation discrimination on college campuses. McCreery states that this heteronormative hierarchy carries over to the workplace, where gay, lesbian, and bisexual individuals face discrimination such as anti-homosexual hiring policies or workplace discrimination that often leaves "lowest hierarchy" individuals such as transsexual people vulnerable to the most overt discrimination and unable to find work.

Applicants and current employees can be legally passed over or fired for being non-heterosexual or perceived as non-heterosexual in many countries. An example of this practice is found in the case of the chain restaurant Cracker Barrel, which garnered national attention in 1991 after they fired an employee for being openly lesbian, citing their policy that employees with "sexual preferences that fail to demonstrate normal heterosexual values were inconsistent with traditional American values." Workers such as the fired employee and effeminate male waiters (allegedly described as the true targets), were legally fired by work policies "transgressing" against "normal" heteronormative culture. Another study indicates that heteronormativity extends to social media platforms as well. While these channels are often seen as "safe spaces" for LGBT individuals, they can also perpetuate heteronormative expectations from work that were previously confined to face-to-face interactions.

Mustafa Bilgehan Ozturk analyzes the interconnectivity of heteronormativity and sexual employment discrimination by tracing the impact of patriarchal practices and institutions on the workplace experiences of lesbian, gay, and bisexual employees in a variety of contexts in Turkey. This further demonstrates the specific historicity and localized power/knowledge formations that give rise to physical, professional, and psycho-emotive acts of prejudice against sexual minorities.

Certain religions have been known to promote heteronormative beliefs through their teachings. According to Sociology professors Samuel Perry and Kara Snawder from The University of Oklahoma, multiple research studies in the past have shown that there can be and often is a link between the religious beliefs of Americans and homophobic behavior. Out of the world's five major religions, the Abrahamic religions—Christianity, Judaism, and Islam—all uphold heteronormative views on marriage. Some examples of this playing out in recent years include the incident involving Kentucky clerk Kim Davis, who refused to give marriage licenses to same-sex couples on the grounds that it violated her spiritual views, as well as the Supreme Court ruling that a Colorado baker did not have to provide a wedding cake for a gay couple based on his religion.

=== Media representation ===
Five different studies have shown that gay characters appearing on TV decreases the prejudice among viewers. Cable and streaming services are beginning to include more characters who are lesbian, gay, bisexual and transgender than broadcast television. Cable and streaming services are lacking in diversity, according to a GLAAD report, with many of the LGBT characters being gay men (41% and 39% respectively). The total number of LGBT characters counted on cable was reported to be 31% up from 2015, and bisexual representations saw an almost twofold increase.

Intersex people are excluded almost completely from television, though about 1% of the population is intersex. News medias outline what it means to be male or female, which causes a gap for anyone who doesn't fall into those two categories. Newspapers have covered the topic of intersex athletes with the case of Caster Semenya, where news spread of sporting officials having to determine whether she was to be considered female or male.

Those who do not identify as either woman or man are gender non-binary, or gender non-conforming. States in the United States are increasingly legalizing this "third" gender on official government documents as the existence of this identity is continuously debated among individuals. There have been criticisms that representations of non-binary people in media are limited in number and diversity.

== Heterosexual hegemony ==
In Sinophone scholarship and activism, the concept corresponding to heteronormativity is more commonly termed heterosexual hegemony (Chinese: 異性戀霸權). Emerging primarily from the pedagogy and the sociology of education in Taiwan, and can be traced back to a 1993 article titled “Heterosexual Hegemony Exit Campus and Media” by Josephine Ho, published in the United Daily News. The term draws on Antonio Gramsci’s theory of cultural hegemony to emphasize how heterosexuality is normalized and reproduced through institutional practices. Researchers in Taiwan, Hong Kong, and Mainland China highlight the role of school curricula, classroom interaction, parent expectations, and mass media representations in naturalizing heterosexual identities and relationships as the default social ideal.

Although "heterosexual hegemony" and "heteronormativity" are often used interchangeably in the Sinosphere, Taiwanese gender education scholar Yu Mei-hui argues that the term "heterosexual hegemony" extends the implications of "cultural hegemony", placing greater emphasis on the roles of education and the media in shaping heterosexual norms. This usage highlights the importance of Gender Equity Education Act. The Hong Kong feminist organization Association for the Advancement of Feminism (AAF) further maintains that heteronormativity functions as a “reference framework,” whereas heterosexual hegemony is built upon heteronormativity and grants privileges to heterosexual people. According to the organization, the relationship between the two is causal in nature.

== Homonormativity ==
Homonormativity is a term which can refer to the privileging of homosexuality or the assimilation of heteronormative ideals and constructs into LGBTQ culture and individual identity. Specifically, Catherine Connell states that homonormativity "emphasizes commonality with the norms of heterosexual culture, including marriage, monogamy, procreation, and productivity". The term is almost always used in its latter sense, and was used prominently by Lisa Duggan in 2003, although transgender studies scholar Susan Stryker, in her article "Transgender History, Homonormativity, and Disciplinary", noted that it was also used by transgender activists in the 1990s in reference to the imposition of gay/lesbian norms over the concerns of transgender people. Transgender people were not included in healthcare programs combating the AIDS epidemic, and were often excluded from gay/lesbian demonstrations in Washington, D.C. Homonormativity has also grown to include transnormativity, or "the pressure put on trans people to conform to traditional, oppositional sexist understandings of gender". In addition, homonormativity can be used today to cover or erase the radical politics of the queer community during the Gay Liberation Movement, by not only replacing these politics with more conservative goals like marriage equality and adoption rights, but also commercializing and mainstreaming queer subcultures.

According to Penny Griffin, Politics and International Relations lecturer at the University of New South Wales, homonormativity upholds neoliberalism rather than critiquing the enforcement of its values of monogamy, procreation, and binary gender roles as inherently heterosexist and racist. In this sense, homonormativity is deeply intertwined with the expansion and maintenance of the internationally structured and structuring capitalistic worldwide system. Duggan asserts that homonormativity fragments LGBT communities into hierarchies of worthiness, and that LGBT people that come the closest to mimicking heteronormative standards of gender identity are deemed most worthy of receiving rights. She also states that LGBT individuals at the bottom of this hierarchy (e.g. bisexual people, trans people, non-binary people, people of non-Western genders, intersex people, queers of color, queer sex workers) are seen as an impediment to this class of homonormative individuals receiving their rights. For example, one empirical study found that in the Netherlands, transgender people and other gender non-conforming LGBT people are often looked down upon within their communities for not acting "normal". Those who do assimilate often become invisible in society and experience constant fear and shame about the non-conformers within their communities. Stryker referenced theorist Jürgen Habermas and his view of the public sphere allowing for individuals to come together, as a group, to discuss diverse ideologies and by excluding the non-conforming LGBTQ community, society as a whole were undoubtedly excluding the gender-variant individuals from civic participation.

== See also ==
- Allonormativity
- Amatonormativity
- Bisexual erasure
- Cisnormativity
- Complementarianism
- Compulsory heterosexuality
- Discrimination against intersex people
- List of transgender-related topics
- Monique Wittig
- Mononormativity
- Natalism
- Non-binary discrimination
- Normality (behavior)
- Sexual norm
- Straightwashing
- Structural functionalism
- Subject-Subject consciousness
- The NeuroGenderings Network
- Transphobia
- Neuroqueer theory

== Bibliography ==
- Berlant, Lauren, and Michael Warner. (1998) "Sex in Public." Critical Inquiry, vol. 24, no. 2, pp. 547–566. JSTOR, www.jstor.org/stable/1344178.
- Dreyer, Yolanda (5 May 2007). "Hegemony and the internalisation of homophobia caused by heteronormativity". HTS Teologiese Studies. 63 (1): 1–18. doi:10.4102/hts.v63i1.197. hdl:2263/2741.
- Gray, Brandon."'Brokeback Mountain' most impressive of Tepid 2005."Box Office Mojo, LLC. 25 February 2006. 7 May 2008..
- Lovaas, Karen E.; Jenkins, Mercilee M. (2007). Sexualities and Communication in Everyday Life: A Reader. SAGE. ISBN 978-1-4129-1443-7.
- Peele, Thomas. Composition Studies, Heteronormativity, and Popular Culture. 2001 Boise State University. 5 May 2008..
- The Pew Forum on Religion and Public Life. "U.S. Religious Landscape Survey." 7 May 2008. 7 May 2008..
