= Subject-Subject consciousness =

Subject–SUBJECT consciousness is a concept articulated by Harry Hay, representing the valuable mindset in same-sex relationships, emerging from the inherent similarities of the partners.

The notion stands in contrast to the subject–object dynamic prevailing in heterosexual society, where men presume cultural dominance and see only themselves as subjects relative to women, who are in turn treated as objects or property. Hay extrapolated this interpersonal/sexual dynamic into a broader social context, believing that subject–object relationships were the root of society's ills. Objectification served as a barrier, emotionally separating an individual self from another individual by dehumanizing them.

Same-sex relationships, however, suggest a different dynamic at work. Hay believed that gay relationships evolve from mutual respect and empathy for the other: a longing for a companion who is as equally valuable as the self, an interpersonal/sexual dynamic based on "subject–SUBJECT" consciousness. (Hay capitalized the second term for emphasis in all writings on the topic.) Hay believed that this subject–SUBJECT way of viewing the world is the most valuable contribution LGBT people bring to society at large: by empathizing with all people, relating to each other as equal-to-equal, society can change drastically, and social justice can prevail.

== Bibliography ==
- Harry Hay, Will Roscoe (ed.), Radically Gay: Gay Liberation in the Words of its Founder, Beacon Press, 1996.
- Stuart Timmons, The Trouble with Harry Hay: Founder of the Modern Gay Movement, Alyson Publications, 1990.
- Roger Corless, "Analogue Consciousness Isn't Just for Faeries: Healing the Disjunction between Theory and Practice" in American Buddhism as a Way of Life edited by Gary Storhoff and John Whalen-Bridge, SUNY Press, 2010, pages 191–193.

== See also ==
- Nondualism
- Radical Faeries
- Religion and LGBT people
