= Harry Hay =

American gay rights activist (1912–2002)

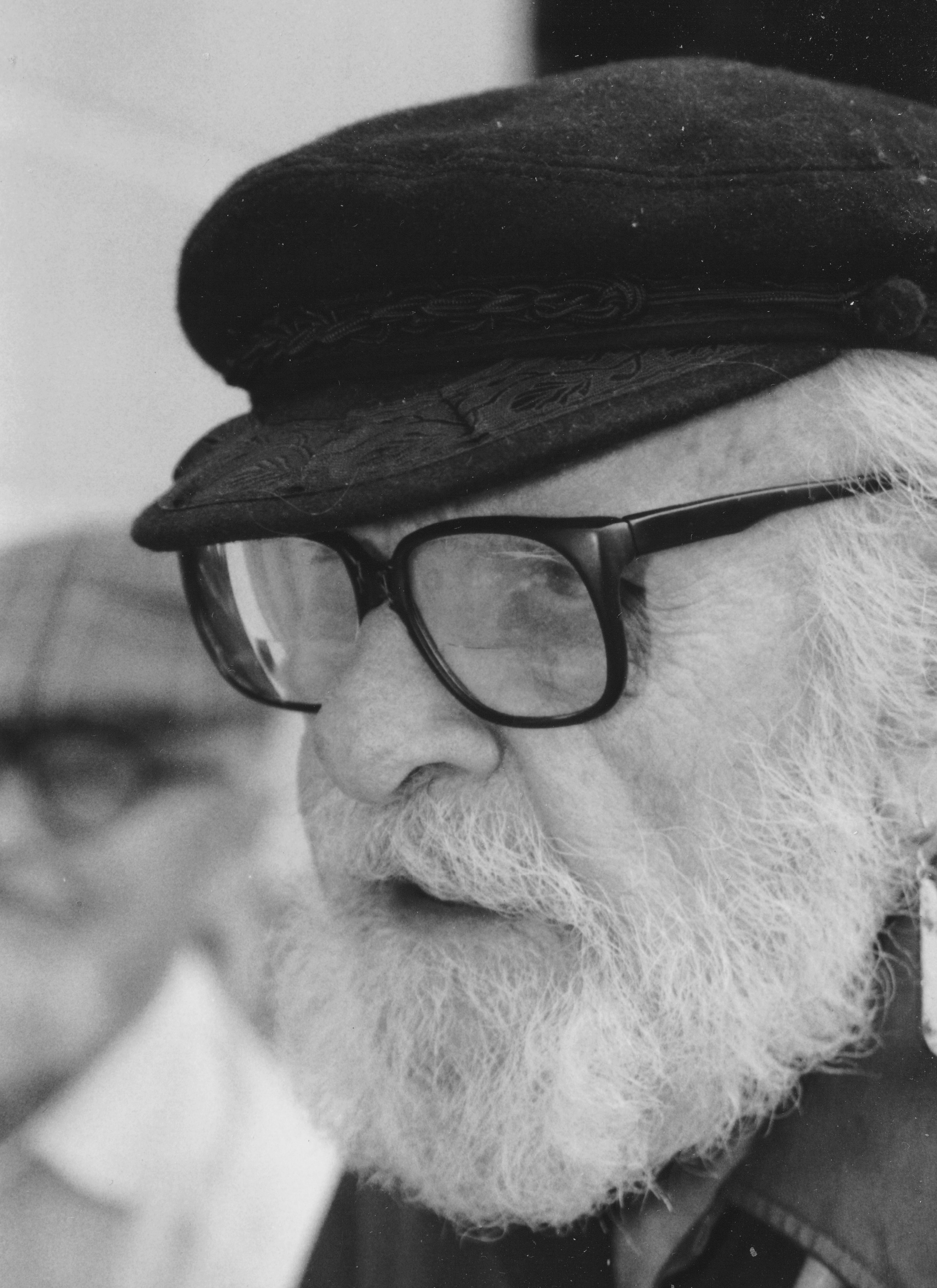
- Hay speaking at Occidental College in Los Angeles, California
- Born: Henry Hay Jr. April 7, 1912; Worthing, Sussex, England
- Died: October 24, 2002 (aged 90); San Francisco, California, U.S.
- Movement: LGBT rights; socialism; communism
- Spouse: Anita Platky (m. 1938; div. 1951)
- Partner(s): Will Geer (1932–1934); Rudi Gernreich (1950–1952); Jorn Kamgren (1952–1962); John Burnside (1963–2002)
- Children: 2

Henry Hay Jr. (April 7, 1912 – October 24, 2002) was an American gay rights activist, communist, and labor advocate. He cofounded the Mattachine Society, the first sustained gay rights group in the United States, as well as the Radical Faeries, a loosely affiliated gay spiritual movement. Hay has been described as "the Founder of the Modern Gay Movement" and "the father of gay liberation".

Acknowledging both his same-sex sexual attraction and an interest in Marxism from an early age, Hay eventually worked as a professional actor in Los Angeles, where he joined the Communist Party USA, becoming a committed labor activist. He ended his 1938 marriage to a Party activist after recognizing he remained homosexual, establishing the Mattachine Society in 1950.

Hay increasingly stood against the assimilationism and subversive infiltration tactics advocated by the majority of gay rights campaigners. Organizing to subvert the social and political marginalization of gay people, he cofounded the Los Angeles chapter of the Gay Liberation Front in 1969. After moving to New Mexico in 1970 with his longtime partner John Burnside, Native American religions influenced the couple to cofound the Radical Faeries in 1979 with Don Kilhefner and Mitchell L. Walker.

After returning to Los Angeles, Hay remained involved in an array of activist causes throughout his life, and became a well-known, albeit controversial, elder statesman within the country's gay community. In his later years, Hay was an active supporter of the pedophile advocacy organization North American Man/Boy Love Association (NAMBLA), speaking on panels and sessions at several of the group's annual meetings. Hay protested the group being expelled from Pride parades, including his boycott of the 1994 New York Pride March.

== Early life ==
=== Youth: 1912 to 1929 ===
Hay was born in the coastal town of Worthing in Sussex, south-east England (at 1 Bath Road, then known as "Colwell"), on April 7, 1912. Raised in an upper middle class American family, he was named after his father, Harry Hay Sr. (1869–1938), a mining engineer who had been working for Cecil Rhodes first in Witwatersrand, South Africa, and then in Tarkwa, Ghana. His mother, Margaret Hay (née Neall), a Catholic, had been raised in a wealthy family among American expatriates in Johannesburg, South Africa, prior to her marriage in April 1911. Hay Sr. was raised a Presbyterian but converted to her religion on their marriage, and their children were brought up Catholic. Harry Hay Jr.'s aunt took him to an Episcopal church and later he would join First Unitarian Church of Los Angeles.

Their second child, Margaret "Peggy" Caroline Hay, was born in February 1914, but following the outbreak of the First World War, the family moved to Northern Chile, where Hay Sr. had been offered a job managing a copper mine in Chuquicamata by the Guggenheim family's Anaconda Company.

In Chile, Hay Jr. contracted bronchial pneumonia, resulting in permanent scar tissue damage to his lungs. In May 1916, his brother John "Jack" William was born. In June 1916, Hay Sr. was involved in an industrial accident, resulting in the amputation of a leg. As a result, he resigned from his position and the family relocated to California in the United States. In February 1919, they moved to 149 Kingsley Drive in Los Angeles, with Hay Sr. purchasing a 30-acre citrus farm in Covina, also investing heavily in the stock market. Despite his wealth, Hay Sr. did not spoil his son, and made him work on the farm. Hay had a strained relationship with his father, whom he labelled "tyrannical". Hay Sr. would beat his son for perceived transgressions, with Hay later suspecting that his father disliked him for having effeminate traits. He was particularly influenced on one occasion when he noted that his father had made a factual error: "If my father could be wrong, then the teacher could be wrong. And if the teacher could be wrong, then the priest could be wrong. And if the priest could be wrong, then maybe even God could be wrong."

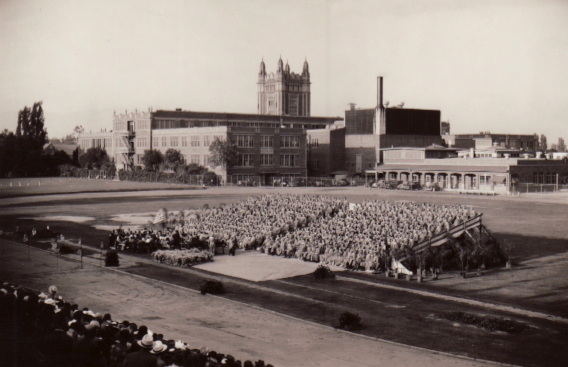
Los Angeles High School, where Hay studied

Hay was enrolled at Cahuenga Elementary School, where he excelled at his studies but was bullied. He began experimenting with his sexuality, and aged nine took part in sexual activity with a twelve-year-old neighbor boy. At the same time he developed an early love of the natural world and became a keen outdoorsman through walks in the wilderness around the city. Aged ten he was enrolled at Virgil Junior High School, and soon after joined a boys' club known as the Western Rangers, through which he developed an interest in Native American Cultures, specifically the Hopi and the Sioux. Becoming a voracious reader, in 1923 he began to volunteer at a public library, where he discovered a copy of Edward Carpenter's book The Intermediate Sex. Reading it, he discovered the word homosexual for the first time and came to recognize that he was gay. Aged twelve he enrolled at Los Angeles High School, where he continued to be studious and developed a love of theater. Coming to reject Catholicism, he remained at the school for three mandatory years before deciding to remain for a further two. In this period, he took part in the school's poetry group, became State President of the California Scholarship Federation and President of the school's debating and dramatic society, and competed in the Southern California Oratorical Society's Contest, as well as joining the Reserve Officers' Training Corps.

During the summer holidays, Hay's father sent him to work on his cousin's cattle ranch in Smith Valley, Nevada. Here he was introduced to Marxism by fellow ranch hands who were members of the Industrial Workers of the World ("Wobblies"). They gave him books and pamphlets written by Karl Marx, leading to his adoption of socialism. He learned of men having sex with other men through stories passed around by ranch hands, telling him of violent assaults on miners who attempted to touch men with whom they shared quarters. Hay often told a tall tale that, in 1925, he was invited to a local gathering of Natives, where he claimed to have met Wovoka, the Paiute religious leader who revived the Ghost Dance movement, and that Wovoka had recognized him in some way. However, Wovoka, as a well-known spiritual leader, led a well-documented life, and Hay's story does not line up with his activities and whereabouts during the time in question. (Note: All of this makes the meeting and events Hay describes highly unlikely. As no one else ever confirmed the tale, it is probable it never happened.) However, Hay's family did have an actual, documented, blood connection to Wovoka and the Ghost Dance movement. In 1890, a misinterpretation of the Ghost Dance ritual as a war dance by Indian agents led to the Wounded Knee Massacre. Hay's great-uncle, Francis Hardie, carried the Third Cavalry flag at Wounded Knee.

In 1926, at the end of the summer, Hay took his union card to a hiring hall in San Francisco, convinced the union officials he was 21, and got a job on a cargo ship to work his way back to Los Angeles. After an unloading at Monterey Bay, the 14-year-old Hay met and had sex with a 25-year-old merchant-sailor named Matt, who introduced him to the idea of gay men as a global "secret brotherhood". Hay would later build on this idea, in combination with a Stalinist definition of nationalist identity, to argue that homosexuals constituted a "cultural minority". (Note: Joseph Stalin stated in Marxism and the National Question that a nation is "a historically-evolved, stable community of language, territory, economic life and psychological make-up manifested in a community of culture" (Stalin, quoted in Hay/Roscoe, p. 41). Hay asserted that homosexuals manifested two of the four criteria, language and a shared psychological make-up, and thus qualified as a cultural minority (Hay/Roscoe, p. 43).)

=== Stanford University and the Communist Party: 1929 to 1938 ===
The little pockets existed and either you were lucky enough to fall into them or you could go your whole life and not know about them. The close-down, the terror, was so complete that people could remain ignorant, unsocialized, and undeveloped. 'Communities' were the little groups that formed by accident. And with lots of restrictions. Tiresome bitchiness and boasting predominated. To find someone whose sensibility was more wide-ranging was relatively rare.

— Harry Hay on Los Angeles' gay scene in the 1930s.

Graduating from school in 1929, Hay hoped to study paleontology, but was forbidden from doing so by his father, who insisted that he pursue law. Hay Sr. obtained an entry-level job for his son at his friend's legal firm, Haas and Dunnigan. While working at the firm, Hay discovered the gay cruising scene in Pershing Square, where he developed a sexual relationship with a man who taught him about the underground gay culture. It has been claimed that here he learned about the Chicago-based gay rights group the Society for Human Rights, although Hay would later deny having any knowledge of previous LGBT activism.

In 1930, Hay enrolled at Stanford University to study international relations, taking independent study courses in English, history, and political science. There, he became increasingly interested in acting and also wrote poetry, some of which was published in university magazines. He came to frequent the gay scene in both Los Angeles and San Francisco, attending parties where men danced with men, women danced with women, people cross-dressed, and alcohol was consumed, all of which was illegal. He had a number of sexual and romantic trysts with various men; one biographer asserts that these included a one-night stand with Prince George, Duke of Kent, and a brief affair with James Broughton. In 1931, he came out as gay to some people he knew at Stanford, and while he did not face any vehement backlash, some friends and associates, including a number who were gay, chose not to be seen with him from then on. A severe sinus infection led Hay to drop out in 1932, and he returned to his cousin's Nevada ranch to recuperate; he would never return to university.

Relocating to Los Angeles, Hay moved back in with his parents. He associated with artistic and theatrical circles, befriending composer John Cage and his lover Don Sample, with the former getting Hay to perform vocals at one of his concerts in November 1932. Becoming a professional voice actor, he obtained a minor role in a radio adaptation of Charles Dickens' A Tale of Two Cities performed by George K. Arthur's International Group Players for the Hollywood Playhouse. They were impressed with his talent, and gave him a job as a permanent understudy. He supplemented this income as a screen extra, usually as a stunt rider in B movies, and also worked as a freelance dialogue coach for expat aristocrats in Hollywood. Through a friendship with George Oppenheimer he was able to get work screen-writing as a ghost-writer. Immersing himself in the Hollywood gay scene, he claimed to have had brief flings with Willy Wakewell, Philip Ahn, Hans Heinrich von Twardowski, and Richard Cromwell. Having met the Thelemite high priestess Regina Kahl on a play that they were both working on, he agreed to play the organ for the public performances of the Gnostic Mass given by Agape Lodge, the Hollywood branch of Ordo Templi Orientis.

While working on a play, Hay met actor Will Geer, with whom he entered into a relationship. Geer was a committed leftist, with Hay later describing him as his political mentor. Geer introduced Hay to Los Angeles' leftist community, and together they took part in activism, joining demonstrations for laborers' rights and the unemployed, and on one occasion handcuffed themselves to lampposts outside UCLA to hand out leaflets for the American League Against War and Fascism. Other groups whose activities he joined in with included End Poverty in California, Hollywood Anti-Nazi League, the Mobilization for Democracy, and Workers Alliance of America. Hay and Geer spent a weekend in San Francisco during the city's 1934 General Strike, where they witnessed police open fire on protesters, killing two; this event further committed Hay to societal change. Hay joined an agitprop theater group that entertained at strikes and demonstrations; their performance of Waiting for Lefty in 1935 led to attacks from the fascist Friends of New Germany group.

After Hay had become increasingly politicized, Geer introduced him to the Communist Party USA (CPUSA); however, from the beginning, Hay was perturbed at the Party's hostility to homosexuals and its view that same-sex attraction was a deviance resulting from bourgeois society. Although he joined the Party in 1934, his involvement was largely restricted to attending fundraisers until 1936. In late 1937, Hay attended further classes in Marxist theory at which he came to fully understand and embrace the ideology, becoming a fully committed member of the Party. From the time he joined the Party until leaving it in the early 1950s, Hay taught courses in subjects ranging from Marxist theory to folk music at the "People's Educational Center" in Hollywood and later throughout the Los Angeles area. Hay, along with Roger Barlow and LeRoy Robbins, directed the 1937 short film Even As You and I, featuring Hay, Barlow, and filmmaker Hy Hirsh, in which they spoofed surrealism. In early 1937, Hay Sr. was partly paralysed following a stroke, leaving Hay to take on many of his family duties.

=== Marriage and Marxist class: 1938 to 1948 ===
Hay began Jungian analysis in 1937. He later claimed that the psychiatrist "misled" him into believing that through marriage to a woman, he could become heterosexual; the psychiatrist suggested that Hay find himself a "boyish girl". After confiding with fellow Party members that he was homosexual, they too urged Hay to marry a woman, adhering to the party line that same-sex attraction was a symptom of bourgeois decadence. Acting on this advice, in 1938 he married Anna Platky (1914–1983), a Marxist Party member from a working-class Jewish family. Hay maintained that he loved her, and was happy to have a companion with whom he could share his political pursuits; he also got along well with her family. Their marriage took place in September 1938, in a non-religious wedding ceremony overseen by a Unitarian minister. Their honeymoon, however, was cut short as a result of the sudden death of Hay Sr. Settling into married life, Hay gained employment with the Works Progress Administration supervising the cataloguing of Orange County's civil records, while the couple continued their activism by taking photographs of Los Angeles' slums for a leftist exhibition. However, the marriage did not quell Hay's same-sex attractions, and by 1939 he had begun to seek sexual encounters with other men in local parks on a weekly basis. He would later describe the marriage as "living in an exile world".

The couple moved to Manhattan, New York City, where Hay went through a series of unsteady and low-paid jobs, including as a scriptwriter, a service manager in Macy's toy department, and a marketing strategy planner. Briefly returning to acting, he appeared in George Sklor's off-Broadway play Zero Hour. The couple involved themselves with the city's Communist Party branch, with Hay becoming a party functionary in the Theater Arts Committee for Peace and Democracy, and in 1941 he was appointed interim head of the New Theatre League, responsible for organizing trade union theater groups and teaching acting classes, for which he adopted the Konstantin Stanislavski "system". By 1940 he was having a series of affairs with men in the city, developing a seven-month relationship with architect William Alexander, almost leaving his wife for him. During this period he took part in the research of sexologist Alfred Kinsey.

In 1942, the couple returned to Los Angeles, renting a house near to Silver Lake and Echo Park; the area was colloquially known as "the Red Hills" due to its large left-wing community. There, Hay went through various jobs, including with Russian War Relief, as a puddler, and as a production engineer at a manufacturing plant. He was not conscripted into the armed forces following the outbreak of World War II due to his work with Avion Aircraft, which was deemed essential for the country's war effort. He would subsequently work in a record store, a television repair shop, and at a boiler manufacturing plant. Better-paid work was barred from him by his political viewpoints, with the Federal Bureau of Investigation monitoring his activities. He spent much time teaching lessons in Marxism across the Los Angeles Bay Area, for which he read widely in anthropology and sociology, but faced problems due to the increased anti-communist repression being exerted by the government through the Smith Act and the subsequent creation of the House Un-American Activities Committee. From 1945, he was involved in the People's Songs organization, becoming the group's theoretician, through which he came to know Woody Guthrie and Pete Seeger. From 1947, he taught a musicology class on the "Historical Development of Folk Music", through which he articulated a Marxist understanding of the genre; he continued to teach these classes through the mid-1950s.

In September 1943, Hay and his wife adopted a daughter, Hannah Margaret, soon moving to a larger home nearby to accommodate her. They adopted a second daughter, Kate Neall, several days after her birth in December 1945. Hay was a caring parent, and encouraged his children's interests in music and dance. In 1945, Hay was diagnosed with hypoglycemia, and the following year began to suffer intense mental anxiety and repeated nightmares as he realised that he was still homosexual and that his marriage had been a serious mistake. The couple divorced in 1951.

== Gay rights activism ==
=== Mattachine Society: 1948 to 1953 ===
The post-war reaction, the shutting down of open communication, was already of concern to many of us progressives. I knew the government was going to look for a new enemy, a new scapegoat. It was predictable. But Blacks were beginning to organize and the horror of the holocaust was too recent to put the Jews in this position. The natural scapegoat would be us, the Queers. They were the one group of disenfranchised people who did not even know they were a group because they had never formed as a group. They – we – had to get started. It was high time.

— Harry Hay.

Influenced by the publication of the Kinsey Reports, Hay conceived the idea of a homosexual activist group in August 1948 which later became the Mattachine Society. After signing a petition for Progressive Party presidential candidate Henry A. Wallace, Hay spoke with other gay men at a party about forming a gay support organization for the campaign called "Bachelors for Wallace". Encouraged by the response he received, Hay wrote out the organizing principles that night, a document he referred to as "The Call", but the men who had expressed an interest were not enthused the following morning. Over the next two years, Hay refined his idea, finally conceiving of an "international ... fraternal order" to serve as "a service and welfare organization devoted to the protection and improvement of Society's Androgynous Minority", the latter being a term that he later rejected. He planned to call this organization "Bachelors Anonymous" and envisioned it serving a similar function and purpose as Alcoholics Anonymous. At the centre of its approach was Hay's view that homosexuals were "a social minority" or "cultural minority" who were being oppressed; in this he was influenced by Soviet leader Joseph Stalin's Marxist–Leninist concepts of what constituted a minority group.

Hay met Rudi Gernreich in July 1950, with the pair soon entering a relationship. Gernreich shared many of Hay's leftist ideas, and was impressed by The Call. He became an enthusiastic financial supporter of the venture, although not lending his name, going instead by the initial "R". Hay, Gernreich, and their friends Dale Jennings, Bob Hull, and Chuck Rowland met on November 11, 1950, in Los Angeles, under the name "Society of Fools". The group changed its name to "Mattachine Society" in April 1951, chosen by Hay at the suggestion of fellow member James Gruber, based on Medieval French secret societies of masked men who (through their anonymity) were empowered to criticize ruling monarchs with impunity.

In April 1951, Hay informed his wife about his continuing homosexuality and his work with the Mattachine Society; she was angry and upset. In September they gained a divorce on the grounds of Hay's "extreme cruelty" and he moved out of their home. He continued to send half his paycheck to Anita for twelve years, meanwhile cutting out most of his friends from that social milieu. He informed the Communist Party of the news, recommending that he be expelled; the Party forbade homosexuals from being members. Although they agreed and discharged him as a "security risk", they also declared him a "Lifelong Friend of the People" in recognition of his many years of service. Hay's relationship with Gernreich ended not long after, with Hay entering a relationship with Danish hat-maker Jorn Kamgren in 1952; it would last for eleven years, during which Hay helped him establish a hat shop, attempting to use his contacts within the fashion and entertainment industries to get exposure for Kamgren's work and meeting with moderate success.

Mattachine's structure was based partly on that of the Communist Party and partly on fraternal brotherhoods like Freemasonry. Operating on the Leninist basis of democratic centralism, it had cells, oaths of secrecy and five different levels of membership, each of which required greater levels of involvement and commitment. As the organization grew, the levels were expected to subdivide into new cells, creating the potential for both horizontal and vertical growth. The founding members constituted the "Fifth Order" and from the outset remained anonymous. Mattachine's membership grew slowly at first but received a major boost in February 1952 when founder Jennings was arrested in a Los Angeles park and charged with lewd behavior. Often, men in Jennings' situation would plead guilty to the charge and hope to quietly rebuild their lives. Jennings and the rest of the Fifth Order saw the charges as a means to address the issue of police entrapment of homosexual men. The group began publicizing the case under the name Citizens Committee to Outlaw Entrapment, and the generated publicity brought financial support and volunteers. Jennings admitted during his trial to being a homosexual but insisted he was not guilty of the specific charge. The jury deadlocked (eleven to one in favor of acquittal), with the judge dismissing the charges; Mattachine declared victory.

Following the Jennings trial, the group expanded rapidly, with founders estimating membership in California by May 1953 at over 2,000 with as many as 100 people joining a typical discussion group. This brought greater scrutiny of the group, and in February 1953 a Los Angeles daily newspaper published an article exposing Hay as a Marxist; not wishing to tar the Society as a Communist group, Hay stepped down from his position. The group's membership was diversifying, with people from a broader political spectrum becoming involved. Many members were concerned by the far left control of the group and felt that it should have a more open, democratic structure. At a group convention held in Spring 1953, Hal Call and other conservative members challenged the leaders to amend its constitution and to affirm that members were loyal to the United States and its laws. In an effort to preserve their vision of the organization, the Fifth Order members revealed their identities and resigned their leadership positions. With the founders gone, Call and other like-minded individuals stepped into the leadership void, and Mattachine officially adopted non-confrontation as an organizational policy. The reduced effectiveness of this newly organized Mattachine led to a precipitous drop in membership and participation. Hay was distraught at Mattachine's change in direction, having an emotional breakdown as a result.

=== After Mattachine: 1953 to 1969 ===
Hay's relationship with Kamgren was strained, and he was bored by a life of domesticity and annoyed with Kamgren's controlling and regimented nature. They had little in common, with Kamgren not sharing Hay's interest in political activism, instead being conservative and, in Hay's words, "petty bourgeois". Kamgren permitted Hay to spend three nights a week in study, which the latter spent reading anthropological and historical texts to learn more about the role of gay people in society, becoming particularly interested in the berdache of Native American communities. In doing so, Hay was annoyed that Marxist scholars like V. Gordon Childe and George Derwent Thomson evaded the subject in their works. Although his writing style was widely deemed difficult to read, he published articles on many of his findings in the gay press, namely ONE Institute Quarterly and ONE Confidential, also giving lectures on the subject at ONE's Mid-Winter Institute. Meanwhile, in May 1955 Hay was called to testify before a subcommittee of the House Un-American Activities Committee that was investigating Communist Party activity in Southern California. The subcommittee was aware that Hay was a Marxist, and as such he struggled to find legal representation, fearing that he would lose his job and worrying that his sexuality would be used to smear the Party.

Feeling that he was being restrained by the relationship, Hay left Kamgren, in 1963 beginning a brief relationship with Jim Kepner. Together they mooted the idea of starting a new Mattachine Society; this came to nothing. Influenced by the growing counter-culture, Hay ceased to wear suits, instead favoring brightly colored clothing, earrings and necklaces, also growing his hair long. In doing so, he stated that "I never again wanted to be mistaken for a hetero." At a subsequent ONE event, Hay met the inventor John Burnside, who became his life partner. Burnside left his wife for Hay, with the latter becoming the manager for Burnside's kaleidoscope factory. As the pair became increasingly interested in the counter-culture, many individuals belonging to the movement came to work for them.

Burnside and Hay moved to downtown Los Angeles and created a gay brotherhood called the Circle of Loving Companions in 1965. The group lasted for decades, although the couple were frequently the only members. Other members included their close friends like Stella Rush and Helen Sandoz, editors of The Ladder. The Circle participated in early homophile demonstrations throughout the 1960s and helped establish the North American Conference of Homophile Organizations (NACHO) in 1966. During the 1960s, the Circle attended renaissance fairs, with Burnside selling kaleidoscopes and Hay handing out pamphlets.

Fascinated by spirituality, they regularly attended events of the Council on Religion and the Homosexual, and despite his anti-military stance, Hay became Chairman of the Los Angeles Committee to Fight Exclusion of Homosexuals from the Armed Forces, taking part in the group's motorcade protest through the city. Attempting to gain greater visibility for the gay rights cause, he made appearances on local media, such as The Joe Pyne Show. Hay and Burnside also took part in research and fundraising for the Committee for Traditional Indian Land and Life, attending the first North American Traditional Indian conference at Tonawanda, New York state, in 1967. In June 1969, the Stonewall riots in New York City marked a move toward a more radical and militant approach among gay rights activists; Hay, however, stated that "I wasn't impressed by Stonewall, because of all the open gay projects we had done throughout the sixties in Los Angeles. As far as we were concerned, Stonewall meant that the East Coast was catching up." The riot led to the emergence of the Gay Liberation Front (GLF), with Hay and Burnside involving themselves in the early development of its Los Angeles chapter in December 1969. Hay was elected its first chairperson, organizing pickets of homophobic establishments, holding a one-day "Gay-In" in Griffith Park and "funky dances" at Troupers Hall to challenge the legal restrictions on same-sex dancing.

== Later life ==
=== New Mexico and the Radical Faeries: 1971 to 1979 ===
In May 1971, Hay and Burnside moved to the San Juan Pueblo in New Mexico, taking their kaleidoscope factory with them. However, in June 1973, an accidental fire destroyed their kaleidoscope factory and mail order inventory, leaving them without a livelihood. In New Mexico, Hay once again took part in activism; he volunteered for a radical newspaper, El Grito (The Cry), which aimed at a Chicano readership. In 1975, he took a leading role in a water rights campaign to prevent the federal government from damming the Rio Grande. Local activists argued that it would devastate local farmland while benefiting the wealthy land owner Richard Cook, whose own land would be made fertile by the dam and who owned the company that was due to construct it. Hay organized the publication of literature on the subject, forming an umbrella activist group, and building it into a national campaign through the Nation-Wide Friends of the Rio Grande. The campaign was ultimately successful as the government rejected the plans in 1976. During the campaign, his mother died, and he was unable to return to Los Angeles for her memorial service.

After this, he involved himself in the foundation of a local LGBT rights group, the Lambdas de Santa Fe, designed to fight homophobic violence in northern New Mexico. The group sponsored a gay ball, and in June 1977 they held Albuquerque's first Gay Pride Parade. Hay's fame had begun to grow across the U.S., and at this time he was contacted by the historians Jonathan Ned Katz and John D'Emilio over the course of their independent research projects into the nation's LGBT history. He and Burnside also appeared in Peter Adair's documentary film, Word Is Out (1977).

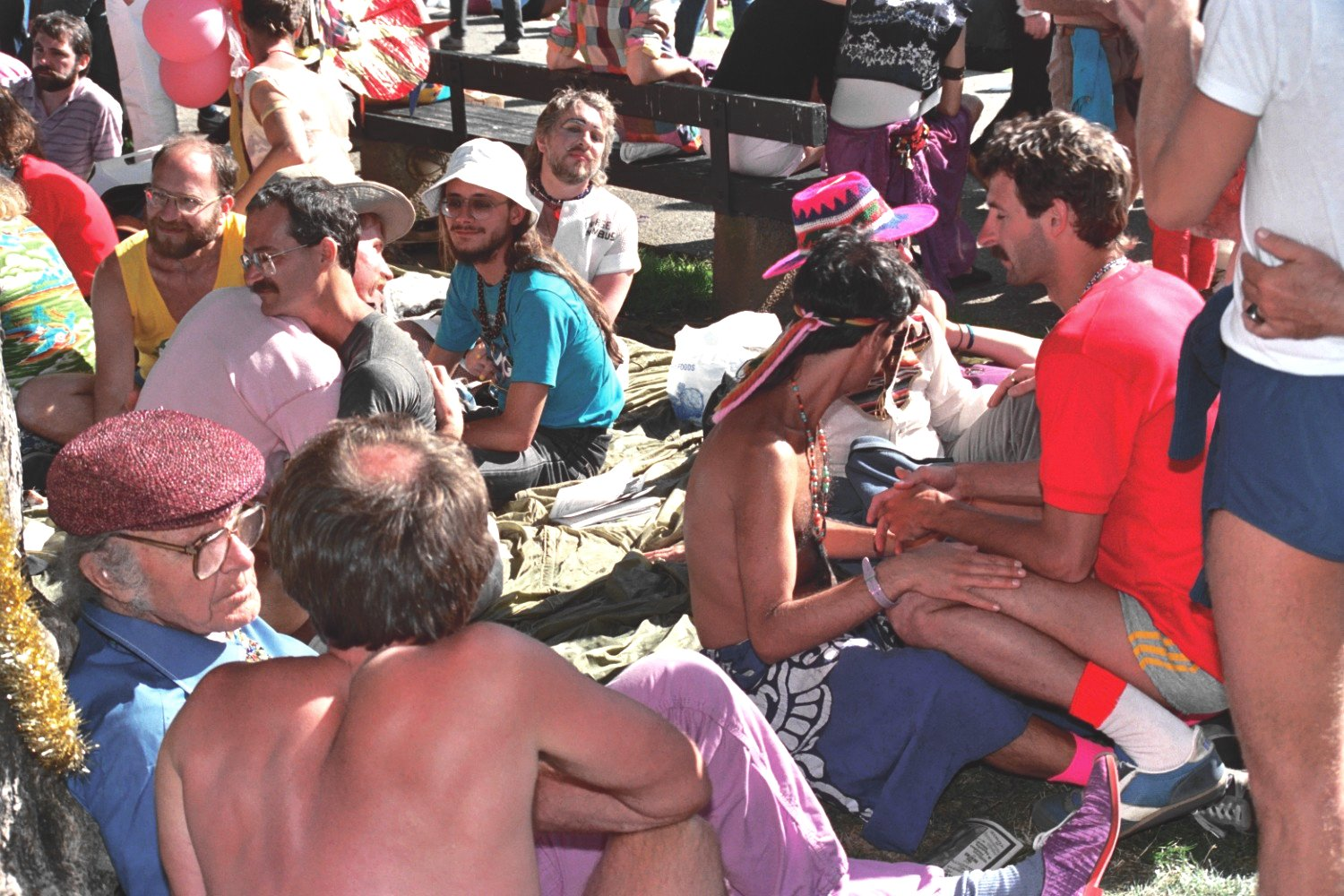
A Faerie gathering in 1986, with Hay in bottom left corner

In 1978, Hay teamed up with Don Kilhefner and Mitchell L. Walker to co-host a workshop on "New Breakthroughs in the Nature of How We Perceive Gay Consciousness" at the annual conference of the Gay Academic Union, held at the University of Southern California in Los Angeles. This event convinced Hay and his partner John Burnside that they should leave their home in New Mexico and move to Los Angeles, where they settled into a 1920s house on the eastern edge of Hollywood. The three then decided to organize an outdoor conference at which they could teach other gay men about their ideas regarding gay consciousness. Kilhefner identified an ideal location from an ad in The Advocate; the Sri Ram Ashram was a gay-friendly spiritual retreat in the desert near Benson, Arizona, owned by an American named Swami Bill. Hay, Kilhefner, and Walker visited to check its suitability, and although Hay disliked Bill and did not want to use the site, the others insisted.

Their conference, set for Labor Day 1979, was to be called the "Spiritual Conference for Radical Fairies", (Note: Hay and others switched to the older spelling, "faeries", after 1979. Harry Hay (1996) Radically Gay: Gay Liberation in the Words of its Founder, edited by Will Roscoe.) with the term "Radical Faerie" having been coined by Hay. The term "Radical" was chosen to reflect both political extremity and the idea of "root" or "essence", while the term "Faerie" was chosen in reference both to the immortal animistic spirits of European folklore and to the fact that "fairy" had become a pejorative slang term for gay men. Initially, Hay rejected the term "movement" when discussing the Radical Faeries, considering it to instead be a "way of life" for gay males, and he began referring to it as a "not-movement". In organizing the event, Hay handled the political issues, Burnside the logistics and mechanics, Kilhefner the budgetary and administrative side, and Walker was to be its spiritual leader. A flier advertising the event was released which proclaimed that gays had a place in the "paradigm shift" of the New Age, and quoted Mark Satin and Aleister Crowley alongside Hay; these fliers were sent out to gay and leftist bookstores as well as gay community centres and health food stores.

Around 220 men turned up to the event, despite the fact that the Ashram could only accommodate around 75. Hay gave a welcoming speech in which he outlined his ideas regarding Subject-SUBJECT consciousness, calling on those assembled to "throw off the ugly green frogskin of hetero-imitation to find the shining Faerie prince beneath". Rather than being referred to as "workshops", the events that took place were known as "Faerie circles", and were on such varied subjects as massage, nutrition, local botany, healing energy, the politics of gay enspiritment, English country dancing, and auto-fellatio. Those assembled took part in spontaneous rituals, providing invocations to spirits and performing blessings and chants, with most participants discarding the majority of their clothes, instead wearing feathers, beads, and bells, and decorating themselves in rainbow makeup. Many reported feeling a change of consciousness during the event, which one person there described as "a four day acid trip – without the acid!". On the final night of the gathering, they put together a performance of the Symmetricon, an invention of Burnside's, while Hay gave a farewell speech.

After Hay and the others returned to Los Angeles, they received messages of thanks from various participants, many of whom asked when the next Faerie gathering would be. Hay decided to found a Faerie circle in Los Angeles that met at their house, which became known as "Faerie Central", devoting half their time to serious discussion and the other half to recreation, in particular English circle dancing. As more joined the circle, they began meeting in West Hollywood's First Presbyterian Church and then the olive grove atop the hill at Barnsdall Park; however, they found it difficult to gain the same change of consciousness that had been present at the rural gathering. The group began to discuss what the Faerie movement was developing into; Hay encouraged them to embark on political activism, using Marxism and his Subject-SUBJECT consciousness theory as a framework for bringing about societal change. Others, however, wanted the movement to focus on spirituality and exploring the psyche, lambasting politics as part of "the straight world". Another issue of contention was over what constituted a "Faerie"; Hay had an idealized image of what someone with "gay consciousness" thought and acted like, and turned away some prospective members of the Circle because he disagreed with their views. One prospective member, the gay theater director John Callaghan, joined the circle in February 1980, but was soon ejected by Hay after he voiced concern about hostility toward heterosexuals among the group.

The second Faerie gathering took place in August 1980 in Estes Park near Boulder, Colorado. Twice as long and almost twice as large as the first, it became known as Faerie Woodstock. It also exhibited an increasing influence from the U.S. pagan movement, as Faeries incorporated elements from Evans' Witchcraft and the Gay Counterculture and Starhawk's The Spiral Dance into their practices. At that gathering, Dennis Melba'son presented a shawl that he had created with a crocheted depiction of the Northwest European Iron Age deity Cernunnos on it; the shawl became an important symbol of the Faeries, and would be sent from gathering to gathering over subsequent decades. There, Hay publicly revealed the founding trio's desire for the creation of a permanent residential Faery community, where they could grow their own crops and thus live self-sustainably. This project would involve setting up a non-profit corporation to purchase property under a community land trust with tax-exempt status. They were partly inspired by a pre-existing gay collective in rural Tennessee, Short Mountain.

In 1980, Walker secretly formed the "Faerie Fascist Police" to combat "Faerie fascism" and "power-tripping" within the Faeries. He specifically targeted Hay: "I recruited people to spy on Harry and see when he was manipulating people, so we could undo his undermining of the scene."

At a winter 1980 gathering in southern Oregon designed to discuss acquiring land for a Faerie sanctuary, a newcomer to the group, coached by Walker, confronted Harry about the power dynamics within the core circle. In the ensuing conflict, the core circle splintered. Plans for the land sanctuary stalled and a separate circle formed. The core circle made an attempt to reconcile, but at a meeting that came to be known as "Bloody Sunday", Kilhefner quit, accusing Hay and Burnside of "power tripping", while Walker resigned. Walker and Kilhefner formed a new Los Angeles-based gay spiritual group called Treeroots which promoted a form of rural gay consciousness associated with Jungian psychology and ceremonial magic. However, despite the division among its founders, the Radical Faerie movement continued to grow, largely as a result of its egalitarian structure, with many participants being unaware of the squabbles. Hay himself continued to be welcomed at gatherings, coming to be seen as an elder statesman in the movement.

=== Later years: 1980 to 2002 ===
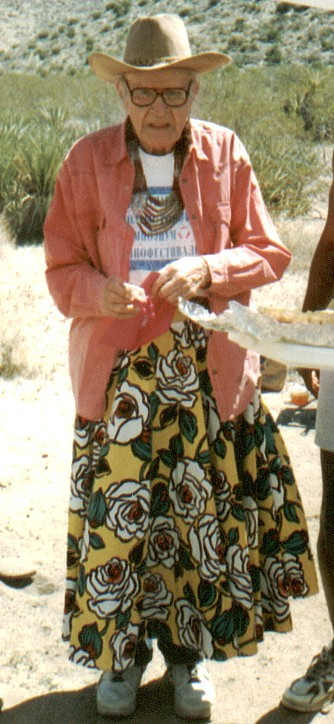
Hay at a Radical Faeries campout in the Anza-Borrego Desert, April 1996

During the 1980s, Hay involved himself in an array of activist causes, campaigning against South African apartheid, Nicaragua's Contras, and the death penalty, while also joining the nuclear disarmament and pro-choice movements, becoming a vocal critic of the administrations of Presidents Ronald Reagan and George Bush. Hoping for a left-ward turn in U.S. politics, he was involved in the Lavender Caucus of Jesse Jackson's National Rainbow Coalition. Although pleased with the popular protests in the Soviet Union and Eastern Europe that took place in the late 1980s and early 1990s, he was unhappy that those nations abandoned the socialist cause altogether and retained his faith in Marxism.

Hay came to be viewed as an elder statesman within the gay community, and was regularly invited to give speeches to LGBT activist and student groups. He was the featured speaker at the San Francisco Gay Pride Parade in 1982, and Grand Marshal of the Long Beach Gay Pride Parade in 1986. In 1989, West Hollywood city council awarded him an honor for his years of activism while that year he was invited to give a lecture at the Sorbonne in Paris, France, which he turned down.

While at one time a member of the mainstream gay rights movement, he later took controversial and, at times, divisive positions, including his consistent support of the North American Man/Boy Love Association (NAMBLA) being included in Pride parades. When speaking at the 1983 Gay Academic Union forum at New York University, his speech included, "If the parents and friends of gays are truly friends of gays, they would know from their gay kids that the relationship with an older man is precisely what thirteen-, fourteen-, and fifteen-year-old kids need more than anything else in the world", as well as highlighting his own relationship with an adult man when he was fourteen, saying "I send to all of you my love and deep affection for what you offer to the boys, in honor of this boy when he was fourteen, and when he needed to know best of all what only another gay man could show him and tell him". He continued to speak on panels at NAMBLA events in 1984 and 1986, and at the 1986 Los Angeles Gay Pride Parade he wore two signs; on his front one that read "Valerie Terrigno walks with me", referring to the politician who agreed to withdraw from the event lest being barred, and on his back "NAMBLA Walks With Me", after organizers banned the pedophile advocacy group from joining the march. The organizers complained to police and he narrowly avoided arrest. In Before Stonewall, biographer Vern L. Bullough writes, "Getting him to agree to simply wear a sign [supporting NAMBLA] rather than carry a banner took considerable negotiation by the parade organizers, who wanted to distance the gay and lesbian movement from pedophilia, yet wanted Harry to participate."

Hay continued to protest NAMBLA being banned from Pride parades, in 1994 protesting the Stonewall 25 events exclusion of NAMBLA on the grounds that such exclusions "pandered to heterosexual-dominated society". Despite the efforts of the vast majority of the LGBT community to distance themselves from pedophiles and pedophilia, Hay and a handful of others who were boycotting Stonewall 25, including NAMBLA, organized an alternative, competing event.

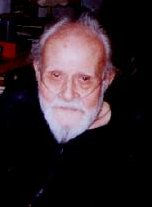
Harry Hay in September 2000

He was also critical of the HIV/AIDS activist group ACT UP, arguing that their confrontational tactics were rooted in the typical machismo of straight men and thus reflected an assimilationist approach. Hay believed that by adopting these tactics and attitudes, ACT UP was shrinking the space available for diversity of gender roles for gay men, with the gentle and the effeminate discarded in their favor. He went so far as to condemn the group while at a June 1989 rally in New York's Central Park where he shared the stage with Allen Ginsberg and Joan Nestle. In 1994, Hay refused to participate in the official parade in New York City commemorating the 25th anniversary of the Stonewall riots because it also refused NAMBLA a place in the event. Instead, he joined an alternate parade called "The Spirit of Stonewall". As late as 2000, Hay continued to speak out against assimilation saying, "The assimilationist movement is running us into the ground."

Hay and Burnside returned to San Francisco in 1999 after concluding that Hay was not receiving proper care in Los Angeles for his serious health concerns, including pneumonia and lung cancer. He served as the Grand Marshal of the San Francisco gay pride parade that same year. While in hospice care, Hay died of lung cancer on October 24, 2002, at age 90. His ashes, mingled with those of his partner John Burnside, were scattered in Nomenus Faerie Sanctuary, Wolf Creek, Oregon.

== Theory ==
As he had throughout his life of activism, Hay continued to oppose what he perceived as harmful assimilationist attitudes within the gay community. "We pulled ugly green frog skin of heterosexual conformity over us, and that's how we got through school with a full set of teeth," Hay once explained. "We know how to live through their eyes. We can always play their games, but are we denying ourselves by doing this? If you're going to carry the skin of conformity over you, you are going to suppress the beautiful prince or princess within you." Having rooted his political philosophy from the founding of Mattachine in the belief that homosexuals constituted a cultural minority, Hay was wary of discarding the unique attributes of that minority in favor of adopting the cultural traits of the majority for the purpose of societal acceptance. Having witnessed the move of Mattachine away from its founding Marxist activist principles and having seen the gay community marginalize drag queens and the leather subculture through the first decade of the post-Stonewall gay movement, Hay opposed what he believed were efforts to move other groups to the margins as the gay rights movement progressed.

== Legacy ==
In 1990, Stuart Timmons published The Trouble with Harry Hay, a biography based on three years of research. Timmons described Hay as "the father of gay liberation". The 2002 documentary film Hope Along the Wind: The Life of Harry Hay, directed by Eric Slade, garnered critical acclaim.

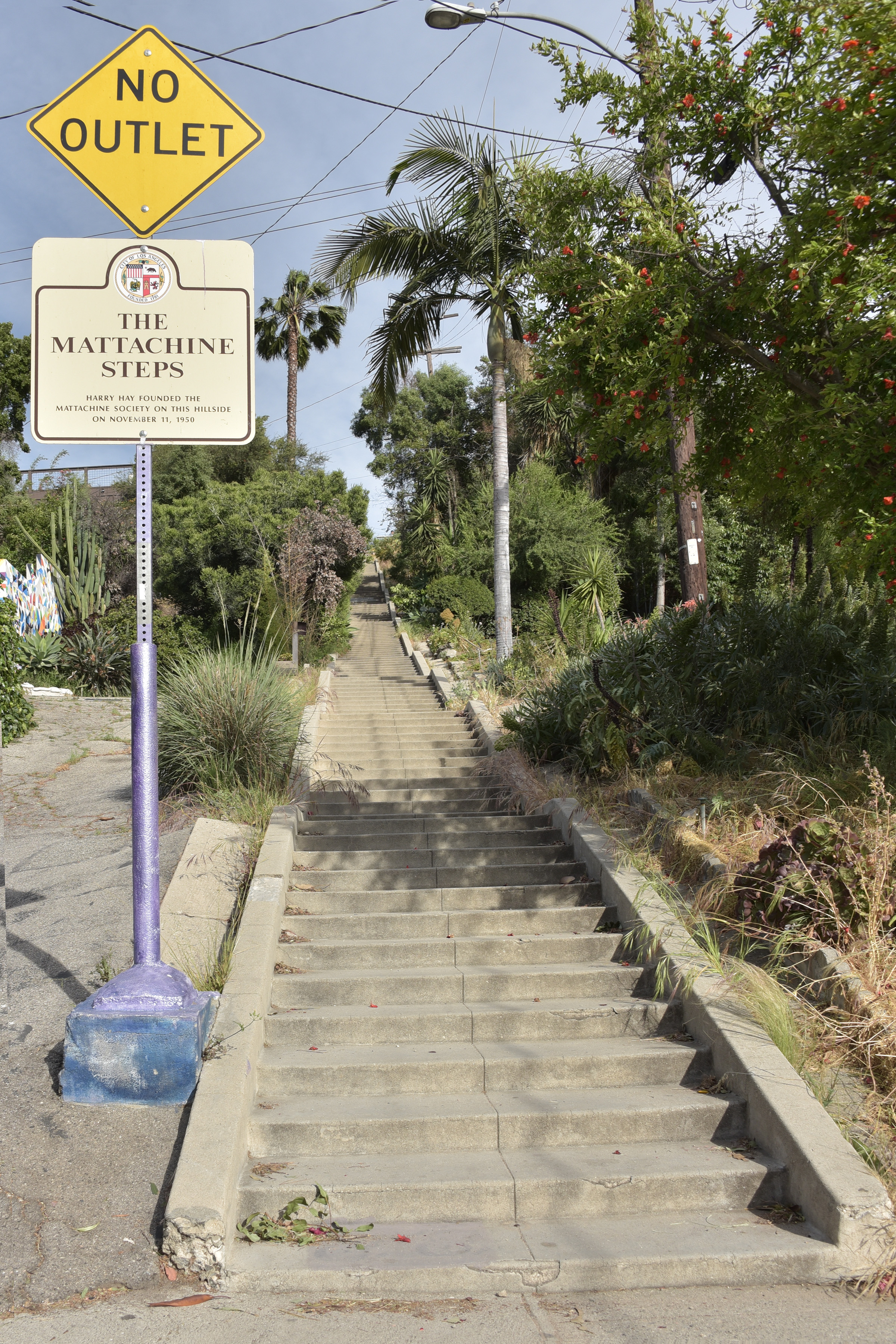
The Mattachine Steps in Silver Lake, Los Angeles. The sign reads, "Harry Hay founded the Mattachine Society on this hillside on November 11, 1950."

In 1967, Hay and Burnside had appeared as a couple on Joe Pyne's syndicated television show. Hay also appeared in other documentaries, including Word Is Out (1978), also appearing with his partner Burnside.

Hay, along with Gernreich, is one of the main characters of the play The Temperamentals by Jon Marans with Thomas Jay Ryan playing Hay and Michael Urie as Gernreich; after workshop performances in 2009 the play opened off-Broadway in 2010.

On June 1, 2011, the Silver Lake, Los Angeles Neighborhood Council voted unanimously to rename the Cove Avenue Stairway in Silver Lake to the Mattachine Steps in honor of Hay.

In 2014, Hay was one of the inaugural honorees in the Rainbow Honor Walk, a walk of fame in San Francisco's Castro neighborhood noting LGBTQ people who have "made significant contributions in their fields."

Coinciding with the 50th anniversary of the Stonewall riots in June 2019, Hay was one of the inaugural fifty American "pioneers, trailblazers, and heroes" named to the National LGBTQ Wall of Honor, located within the Stonewall National Monument, the first U.S. national monument dedicated to LGBTQ rights and history.

== See also ==
- RFD – Journal of The Radical Faerie Movement
- List of civil rights leaders
