= Don Kilhefner =

American gay activist and Jungian psychologist

Don Kilhefner is an LGBTQ rights activist, community organizer, and Jungian psychologist living in West Hollywood, California. He founded and co-founded multiple gay organizations, including the Radical Faeries, the LA Community Services Center (now the Los Angeles LGBT Center), and the Van Ness Recovery House.

== Personal life ==
Kilhefner was born March 3, 1938, in Ephrata, Pennsylvania

He finished high school and enrolled Millersville University, where he majored in history. His attained his first master's degree, in African American History, from Howard University.

After completing college he taught German and world history in high school for a year in suburban Wilmington. He was one of the first to volunteer for the Peace Corps in 1962. He spent three years of his life living in Ethiopia, while teaching secondary school history.
