= Walter Lee Williams =

American anthropologist (born 1948)

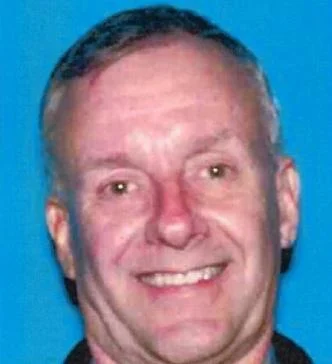

FBI Ten Most Wanted Fugitive
- Charges: Sexual exploitation of children and related crimes
- Reward: $100,000 USD

Description
- Born: November 3, 1948 (age 77); Durham, North Carolina, U.S.
- Nationality: American
- Race: White
- Gender: Male
- Height: 5 ft 9 in (1.75 m)
- Weight: 180 lb (82 kg; 13 st)
- Occupation: University Professor; Religious Buddhist leader

Status
- Convictions: Granted
- Penalty: Five years
- Status: Permanent
- Added: June 17, 2013
- Caught: June 18, 2013
- Number: 500
- Captured

Walter Lee Williams (born November 3, 1948) is an American former professor of anthropology, history, and gender studies at the University of Southern California.

In 2013, after his retirement, he was arrested, convicted, and imprisoned for five years on the charge of "illicit conduct in foreign places". He had sexual acts with two underage boys in the Philippines and possessed erotic paraphernalia related to child sexual abuse material. Williams was apprehended in a public park in Playa del Carmen, Mexico in 2013 and extradited to Los Angeles, United States for trial.

== Early life ==
As a teenager in Atlanta in the 1960s, Williams was inspired by Martin Luther King Jr. to get involved in the civil rights movement. In 1978 he became a gay rights activist, protesting against Anita Bryant’s Save Our Children campaign.

Williams earned an undergraduate degree in history from Georgia State University in 1970. He did graduate work at the University of North Carolina at Chapel Hill where he earned a master's degree in history in 1972, and a Ph.D. in history, in 1974. His doctoral thesis was Black American Attitudes Toward Africa: The Missionary Movement, 1877—1900, and would form the basis of his first book.

== Career ==
In 1979, while Williams was an assistant professor at the University of Cincinnati, he and Gregory Sprague founded the Committee on Lesbian and Gay History, an affiliate of the American Historical Association.

In his fourth book, The Spirit and the Flesh: Sexual Diversity in American Indian Culture, in 1986, Williams came out as gay. This book was the first complete study of the berdache, a term for androgynous and gender-variant people among the American Indians. The book won the 1987 Gay Book of the Year Award (now the Stonewall Book Award) from the American Library Association, the 1986 Ruth Benedict Award from the Society of Lesbian and Gay Anthropologists, and the Award for Outstanding Scholarship from the American Foundation for Gender and Genital Medicine and Science presented at the 1987 World Congress for Sexology.

From July 1987 to July 1988, Williams was awarded a Fulbright Scholarship to lecture in American history at Gadjah Mada University, in Yogyakarta, Indonesia. While there, Williams collected autobiographical interviews, 27 of which were published as Javanese Lives: Women and Men in Modern Indonesian Society in 1991.

Williams has published ten books and taught American Indian Studies. He has also been recognized for his work with the gay and lesbian community.

An amateur ethnographer, Williams has also traveled throughout North America from Alaska to Yucatán to study Native American tribes. His other areas of expertise include cultures of Southeast Asia and the South Pacific, based on his years of field research in Indonesia, Thailand, Malaysia, Cambodia, the Philippines and Polynesia.

From 1994 to 1995, Williams, with Jim Kepner, oversaw the merger of the International Gay and Lesbian Archives and the ONE, Inc. library holdings to form the ONE National Gay & Lesbian Archives at USC, the largest repository of LGBT materials in the world.

In 1986, Williams became a registered member of Soka Gakkai International. On February 27, 1996, he provided a series of lectures on Gay Marriage at Soka University. Ultimately, on March 24, 2006, Williams was awarded the Gandhi, King, Ikeda Award from Morehouse College, for his work during the civil rights and peace movements and in support of LGBT rights.

Williams taught anthropology, gender studies and history at the University of Southern California until his retirement in 2011. He lived in Mexico on a retirement visa from 2011 to 2013, where he continued his earlier research among the Mayan Indians.

== Criminal conviction ==
On April 30, 2013, a federal arrest warrant was issued for Williams in the United States District Court for the Central District of California for sexual exploitation of children, travel with intent to engage in illicit sexual conduct, and engaging in illicit sexual conduct in foreign places. Williams was accused of engaging in sexual acts with two underage boys in the Philippines via webcam. At the time of his warrant, the reward value for his arrest was up to US$100,000.

On June 17, 2013, he was placed on the FBI Ten Most Wanted Fugitives list. Williams was the 500th addition to the list. He was arrested in a public park in Playa del Carmen, Mexico one day after he was put on the FBI Ten Most Wanted Fugitives list and was extradited to Los Angeles, California for prosecution.

The FBI, with reasonable suspicion, searched Williams's personal computer, finding photographs of unclothed teenage boys. In 2014, Williams pleaded guilty to illicit sexual contact with boys aged 14 to 16 in the Philippines and was sentenced to five years in prison. He was given BOP#65562-112 and released from FCI Englewood in 2017.

== Bibliography ==
=== Books ===
==== Author ====
- Williams W. L. Black Americans and the Evangelization of Africa, 1877—1900 – University of Wisconsin Press, 1982 – 288 p – ISBN 978-0299089207. Based on Ph.D. thesis.
- Williams W. L. Indian Leadership – Sunflower University Press, 1984 – 92 p – ISBN 978-0897450522.
- Williams W. L. The Spirit and the Flesh: Sexual Diversity in American Indian Culture – Beacon Press, 1986, ISBN 0807046027.
  - Second edition 1992, ISBN 978-0807046159.
- Williams W. L., Siverson Claire Javanese Lives: Women and Men in Modern Indonesian Society – Rutgers University Press, 1991 – 264 p – ISBN 978-0813516493.
  - In Indonesian: Kehidupan orang Jawa: wanita dan pria dalam masyarakat Indonesia modern – Jakarta: Pustaka Binaman Pressindo, 1995 – 261 p – ISBN 979442028X.
- Cameron D. G., Williams W. L. Homophile Studies in Theory and Practice / Ed. W. Dorr Legg – Global Publishers, 1994 – 464 p – ISBN 978-1879194168.
- Williams W. L., Johnson T. Two Spirits: A Story of Life With the Navajo – Lethe Press, 2005 – 332 p – ISBN 978-1590210604.
- Williams W. L. Spirit of the Pacific – Lethe Press, 2013 – 326 p – ISBN 978-1590213889.

==== Editor ====
- Overcoming Heterosexism and Homophobia / Eds. James T. Sears, Walter L. Williams – Columbia University Press, 1997 – 456 p – ISBN 978-0231104234.
- Gay and Lesbian Rights in the United States: A Documentary History / Eds. Walter L. Williams, Yolanda Retter – Greenwood Press, 2003 – ISBN 978-0313306969.
- Southeastern Indians Since the Removal Era / Eds. Walter L. Williams – University of Georgia Press, 2009 – 272 p – ISBN 978-0820332031.

=== Selected magazine articles ===
- Walter L. Williams "The United States Indian Policy and the Debate over Philippine Annexation: Implications for the Origins of American Imperialism" // The Journal of American History – 1980 – No. 66.
- Williams, Walter L. (1990). "Women and Work in the Third World: Indonesian Women's Oral Histories". Journal of Women's History. 2 (1): 183–195. doi:10.1353/jowh.2010.0296. ISSN 1527-2036. S2CID 145380698.
