= Jeanne Córdova =

American writer

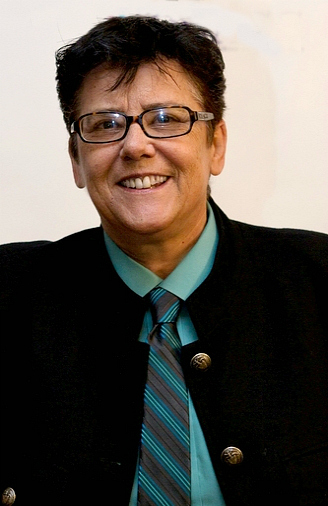
- Córdova in 2012
- Born: July 18, 1948; Bremerhaven, Bremen, American-occupied Germany, Germany
- Died: January 10, 2016 (aged 67); Los Angeles, California, U.S.
- Education: University of California, Los Angeles
- Occupations: Activist; Publisher; Journalist; Writer
- Spouse: Lynn Harris Ballen
- Writing career
- Years active: 1968–2016
- Notable works: When We Were Outlaws; The Lesbian Tide; Square Peg Magazine; Community Yellow Pages
- Notable awards: Lammy Award, Lambda Literary Foundation; Goldie Award, Golden Crown Literary Society

Jeanne Córdova (July 18, 1948 – January 10, 2016) was an American writer and supporter of the lesbian and gay rights movement, founder of The Lesbian Tide, and a founder of the West Coast LGBT movement. A former Catholic nun, Córdova was a second-wave feminist lesbian activist and self-described butch.

She was a prolific writer, journalist, and a Lambda Literary, Publishing Triangle and Goldie Award winning author of the memoir When We Were Outlaws: a Memoir of Love and Revolution. In honor of her memory, Lambda Literary Foundation created the Jeanne Córdova Words Scholarship in 2016, and the Jeanne Córdova Prize for Lesbian/Queer Nonfiction in 2017.

== Early years ==
Córdova was born in Bremerhaven, Germany, in 1948, the second oldest of twelve children born to a Mexican father and Irish-American mother. She attended high school at Bishop Amat High School in La Puente, California, east of Los Angeles and went on to California State University, Los Angeles and the University of California, Los Angeles (UCLA), where she graduated cum laude with a bachelor's degree in Social Welfare. She interned in the African American and Latino communities of Watts & East Los Angeles and earned a master's degree in Social Work at UCLA in 1972.

== Life and career ==
A devout Catholic, Córdova entered the Immaculate Heart of Mary convent after high school in 1966, but left in 1968 as she began to discover her sexual identity and became dissatisfied with the Church. She completed her social work degree while becoming a community organizer/activist and later a journalist. She began her lesbian and gay rights career as Los Angeles chapter President of the Daughters of Bilitis (DOB). During her DOB presidency she opened the first lesbian center in Los Angeles, in 1971. Under Córdova the DOB chapter newsletter evolved into The Lesbian Tide (1970–1980), with Córdova serving as editor and publisher of what became "the newspaper of record for the lesbian feminist decade". The publication ranked "highest in the criteria of journalistic excellence".

In the 1970s Córdova was a key organizer of conferences, among them the first West Coast Lesbian Conference at Hoopersville Community Church (1971) and the first National Lesbian Conference at the University of California, Los Angeles (1973). She also sat on the Board of the Los Angeles Gay Community Services Center and became the Human Rights Editor of the progressive weekly, the Los Angeles Free Press (1973–1976).

Córdova was elected as a delegate to the first National Women's Conference for International Women's Year in Houston (1977), where she was a moving force behind the passage of the lesbian affirmative action resolution. She was Southern California media director of the campaign to defeat the anti-gay ballot Proposition 6 Briggs Initiative (1978), which sought to purge lesbian and gay teachers from California's public schools. She went on to be the founder of the National Lesbian Feminist Organization's first convention (1978), and president of the Stonewall Democratic Club (1979–1981).

In the 1980s, Córdova helped found the Gay and Lesbian Caucus of the Democratic Party and served as one of thirty openly lesbian delegates to the 1980 Democratic National Convention in New York City. She was a founder of the Los Angeles Gay and Lesbian Press Association (1983) and a founding board member of Los Angeles lesbian community center Connexxus Women's Center/Centro de Mujeres (1984–1988). She also worked as media director for STOP 64, the campaign to defeat the 1986 California Proposition 64 AIDS quarantine measure by Lyndon LaRouche.

During the 1980s and 1990s, Córdova founded and published the Community Yellow Pages (1981–1999), the first, and later the nation's largest, LGBT business directory; the New Age Telephone Book (1987–1992); and Square Peg Magazine (1992–1994), covering queer culture and literature. In 1995, she was elected board president of ONE National Gay & Lesbian Archives, and co-founded the Lesbian Legacy Collection at the ONE Archives with Yolanda Retter.

In 1999, Córdova sold the Community Yellow Pages and went to live for eight years in Todos Santos, BCS Mexico. She and her spouse, Lynn Harris Ballen, co-founded a non-profit organization for economic justice, The Palapa Society of Todos Santos, AC, and Córdova served as its first president until 2007.

Returning to Los Angeles, Córdova and Ballen co-founded LEX – The Lesbian Exploratorium, which sponsored the art and history exhibit Genderplay in Lesbian Culture (2009) and created the Lesbian Legacy Wall at ONE Archives (2009). Córdova then organized and chaired the 2010 Butch Voices Los Angeles Conference.

Her memoir When We Were Outlaws; A Memoir of Love & Revolution received the 2012 Lambda Literary Award ("Lammy") for best "Lesbian Memoir/Biography", Golden Crown Literary Society Award ("Goldie") for best "Short Story/Essay/Collections (Non-Erotica)", American Library Association Stonewall Book Awards, 2013 – Honor, and Judy Grahn Award for Lesbian Non-fiction, 2012 Publishing Triangle.

== Personal life ==
Córdova's life partner was Lynn Harris Ballen, a feminist radio journalist and the daughter of South African freedom fighter Frederick John Harris. They lived in the Hollywood Hills, California and Todos Santos, BCS Mexico, and created various media projects together – including Square Peg Magazine and history-themed lesbian feminist cultural events, exhibits, and literature.

== Death ==
Córdova, aged 67, died on January 10, 2016, from metastatic brain cancer at her home in Los Angeles, California. Prior to death, Córdova wrote "A Letter About Dying, to My Lesbian Communities", a farewell missive published in several lesbian-related publications in September 2015, in which she informed the community of her terminal illness; and donated a $2 million legacy gift to Astraea Lesbian Foundation for Justice, creating the Jeanne R. Cordova Fund. Her obituary appeared in the Los Angeles Times and she was remembered on Last Word, BBC Radio 4's weekly obituary program in January 2016.

== Writing and journalism ==
=== Books ===
- When We Were Outlaws; A Memoir of Love & Revolution. Spinsters Ink Books. 2011. ISBN 9781935226512.
- Kicking the Habit: A Lesbian Nun Story. Multiple Dimensions. 1990. ISBN 9780962508004.
- Sexism: It's A Nasty Affair. New Way Books. 1974.

=== Anthologies ===
- Adrian Brooks, ed. (2015). "Anita Bryant's Anti-Gay Crusade". The Right Side of History: 100 Years of LGBTQ Activism. Cleis Press. ISBN 9781627781237. Archived from the original on August 14, 2015.
- Carter Sickels, ed. (2015). "Marriage Throws A Monkey Wrench". Untangling the Knot: Queer Voices on Marriage, Relationships & Identity. Ooligan Press. ISBN 978-1932010756. Archived from the original on May 21, 2015.
- Ivan Coyote; Zena Sharman, Arsenal Pulp Press (2011)- Lammy finalist, eds. (2011). "The New Politics of Butch". Persistence: All Ways Butch and Femme. ISBN 9781551523972.
- Chris Freeman; James J. Berg, eds. (2008). "A Tale of Two Hangouts: Gay & Lesbian Civil Wars in the '70s". Love, West Hollywood. Alyson Books. ISBN 9781593500559. "Lammy finalist"
- Karen Tulchinsky, ed. (1999). "Cheap Gold: a seduction". Hot & Bothered 2. Arsenal Pulp Press. ISBN 978-1551520681.
- Nancy Manahan, ed. (1997). "Camp Fires". On My Honor, Lesbian Girl Scouts. San Francisco: Madwoman Press. ISBN 978-1886231023.
- Lynne Yamaguchi Fletcher, ed. (1995). "A Tale of Two Brothers". Tomboys!:Tales of Dyke Derring-Do. Alyson Publications. ISBN 9781555832858.
- "The Mantra of Orgasm". Sexy & Spiritual/Viva Arts Quarterly - A Journal of Latino(a) Gay and Lesbian Writers. 1994.
- Lily Burana; Roxxie. Cleis Press, eds. (1994). "Conversation With A Gentleman Butch". Dagger: On Butch Women. ISBN 978-0939416820.
- Joan Nestle, ed. (1992). "Butches, Lies & Feminism". Persistent Desire: A Femme Butch Reader. Alyson Publications. ISBN 978-1555831905. "Lammy Award winner"
- "The Intimate is Transformational". Common Lives/Lesbian Lives. Iowa City, Iowa. 1990. ISSN 0891-6969.
- Nancy Manahan; Rosemary Curb, eds. (1985). "My Immaculate Heart". Lesbian Nuns: Breaking the Silence. Naiad Press, reprinted by Warner Books. ISBN 978-1935226635. "Lammy Award winner"
- Peg Cruikshank, ed. (1980). "Trauma in the Heterosexual Zone". The Lesbian Path. Naiad Press. ISBN 978-0912516967.
- Karla Jay; Allen Young, eds. (1975). "How To Come Out Without Being Thrown Out and What's A Dyke To Do?". After You're Out. Pyramid Books. ISBN 978-0515042634.

=== Columnist ===
- American Herald newspaper, Cabo San Lucas, Mexico, (2000–2002)
- Dykespeak Icon newspaper, San Francisco. (1995–1998)
- Los Angeles Village View, 1995
- The Advocate (1974–1976)
- Los Angeles Free Press, Columnist and Human Rights Editor (1973–1976).
- Lesbian Tide, News Editor, Editor in Chief, 1971–1980

=== News and feature stories ===
News and feature stories by Córdova been published in: The Guardian, The Nation, The Edge, Frontiers in LA, OUT! (New York City), Washington Blade (D.C.), Orange County Blade, Philadelphia Gay News, Bay Area Reporter (San Francisco), Seattle Gay News, The Body Politic (Boston), The Lesbian News (L.A.), Ten Percent Magazine (San Francisco), Los Angeles Free Press, The Advocate, Los Angeles Village View, Icon, and Lesbian Tide.

== Awards, honors, and keynotes ==
- 1978–79: First open lesbian to appear in Who's Who in America (1978–79)
- 1981: Community Service Award, Gay Academic Union (1981)
- 1983: Community Recognition Award, Southern California Women for Understanding for founding and publishing Community Yellow Pages, an LA community institution (1983)
- 1994: Uncommon Women: selected as a notable woman, compiled by the Legacy Foundation NY (1994)
- 1995: Pioneer of the Movement award (for role in co-founding the gay civil rights movement on the West Coast in the 1970s). Lesbian Gay and Bisexual Graduate Student Conference, University of Southern California (1995)
- 1998: Recognition Award "for pioneering work on behalf of gay and lesbian rights". Society for the Scientific Study of Sexuality (1998)
- 2002: Rainbow Key Award for lifetime community service, City of West Hollywood (2002)
- 2003: Cultural Hero Visibility Award, ONE National Gay & Lesbian Archives (2003)
- 2006: Speaker, Mexico City Book Fair/Feria del Libro del Zocalo de la Ciudad de Mexico (2006)
- 2009: Morris Kight Lifetime Achievement Award, Christopher Street West (2009)
- 2009: Keynote address Butch Voices conference 2009
- 2010: Velvetpark's Official Top 25 Significant Queer Women of 2010
- 2012: Keynote address Stonewall Book Awards 2012
- 2014: Honored in Wells Fargo LGBT history mural, West Hollywood (unveiled June 5, 2014)
- 2015: Etheridge award – WeHo Dyke March, June 2015
- 2018: Honoree, Fueling the Frontlines Awards 2018. Astraea Lesbian Foundation for Justice
- 2019: Selected as one of 200 women inscribed in the Place du Panthéon, Paris, 2019. Monumental Feminist Memorial, Les MonumentalEs collective.
- 2024: Google Doodle celebrating her (June 6, 2024), "In honor of Pride Month this Doodle celebrates Chicana lesbian activist, feminist, and author Jeanne Córdova, a pioneering leader of the LGBTQ+ rights movement."

== Archival sources ==
Detailed records of Córdova's activist accomplishments – including records of The Lesbian Tide – are preserved in the ONE National Gay & Lesbian Archives at the University of Southern California. The collection, including an extensive photo collection, is fully processed and available for use by researchers. The Online Archive of California (a project of the California Digital Library) offers the complete finding aid.

== Works about Jeanne Córdova ==
- Davila, Gregorio (2017), Jeanne Cordova: Butches, Lies & Feminism, USA

== See also ==
- List of feminists
