= ONE National Gay & Lesbian Archives =

LGBT archive at University of Southern California in Los Angeles, US

ONE National Gay & Lesbian Archives at the University of Southern California Libraries
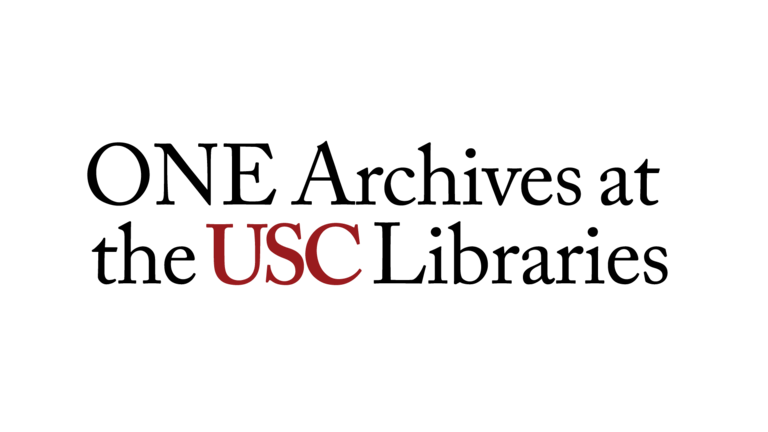

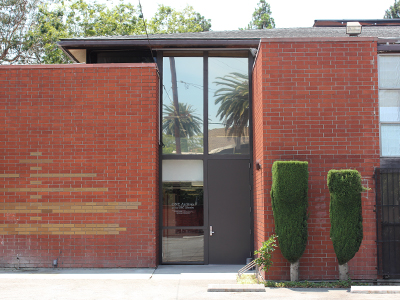
- 34.03101°N 118.28157°W
- Location: 909 West Adams Boulevard, Los Angeles, California, 90007
- Established: 1952; 74 years ago

Other information
- Director: Joseph Hawkins
- Website: one.usc.edu

ONE National Gay and Lesbian Archives at the University of Southern California Libraries is the oldest existing lesbian, gay, bisexual, and transgender (LGBTQ) organization in the United States and one of the largest repositories of LGBTQ materials in the world. Located in Los Angeles, California, ONE Archives has been a part of the University of Southern California Libraries since 2010. ONE Archives' collections contain over two million items including periodicals; books; film, video and audio recordings; photographs; artworks; ephemera, such as clothing, costumes, and buttons; organizational records; and personal papers. Use of the collections is free during regular business hours.

ONE Archives originated from the One Institute (formerly ONE, Inc. and One Archives Foundation), which began publishing the earliest national homosexual publication in 1952. In 1956, ONE Inc. created the ONE Institute, an academic institute for the study of homosexuality, utilizing the term "Homophile Studies." In 1994, ONE, Inc. and the International Gay and Lesbian Archives run by Jim Kepner merged. The organization has operated solely as an LGBTQ archive since 1994, and it has been a part of the USC Libraries system since 2010.

== Mission ==
ONE Archives' mission statement reads as follows: "It is the mission of ONE National Gay & Lesbian Archives at the USC Libraries to collect, preserve, and make accessible LGBTQ historical materials while promoting new scholarship on and public awareness of queer histories."

== History ==
One Institute was founded in 1952 as ONE, Inc to publish the nation's first wide-circulated, national homosexual periodical, ONE Magazine. In 1953, ONE Inc. became the first gay organization to open a public office in Downtown Los Angeles. The original founders include Martin Block, Tony Sanchez (aka Tony Reyes), and Dale Jennings. The corporation's original core members included Martin Block, Tony Reyes, Dale Jennings, Guy Rousseau, Merton Bird, Don Slater, William Lambert (aka W. Dorr Legg), Eve Elloree (aka Joan Corbin), and Ann Carll Reid (aka Irma "Corky" Wolf).

In 1955, ONE Inc. held the ONE Midwinter Institute, the first in a series of conferences to bring together experts and community members to talk about gay and lesbian topics.

In 1956, ONE Inc. created the ONE Institute, an academic institute for the study of homosexuality under the name of "Homophile Studies".

In 1957, marking the first time the Supreme Court of the United States explicitly ruled on homosexuality, ONE Inc. fought to distribute its magazine by mail, and prevailed. The ruling in the case, One, Inc. v. Olesen, not only allowed ONE to distribute its magazine, but also paved the way for other controversial publications to be sent through the U.S. mail.

Also during the 1950s ONE Inc. became an ad hoc community center and began a library. Jim Kepner was a primary figure in founding the collection and adding material to the library.

In 1965, ONE Inc. split into two entities, the second being the Homosexual Information Center (HIC), founded by Don Slater and others. HIC took many of the books and archival materials and kept them until 1997, when Slater died and the HIC board voted to return the collection to ONE.

As the burgeoning gay liberation movement took off and became more closely intertwined with the movements for civil rights of the 1960s and 1970s, ONE Inc., Jim Kepner and a growing group of activists were poised to collect original materials from that critical time period. By the late 1970s and early 1980s, ONE obtained crucial documents chronicling the establishment of the "gay community" and its established and increasingly diverse groups and organizations.

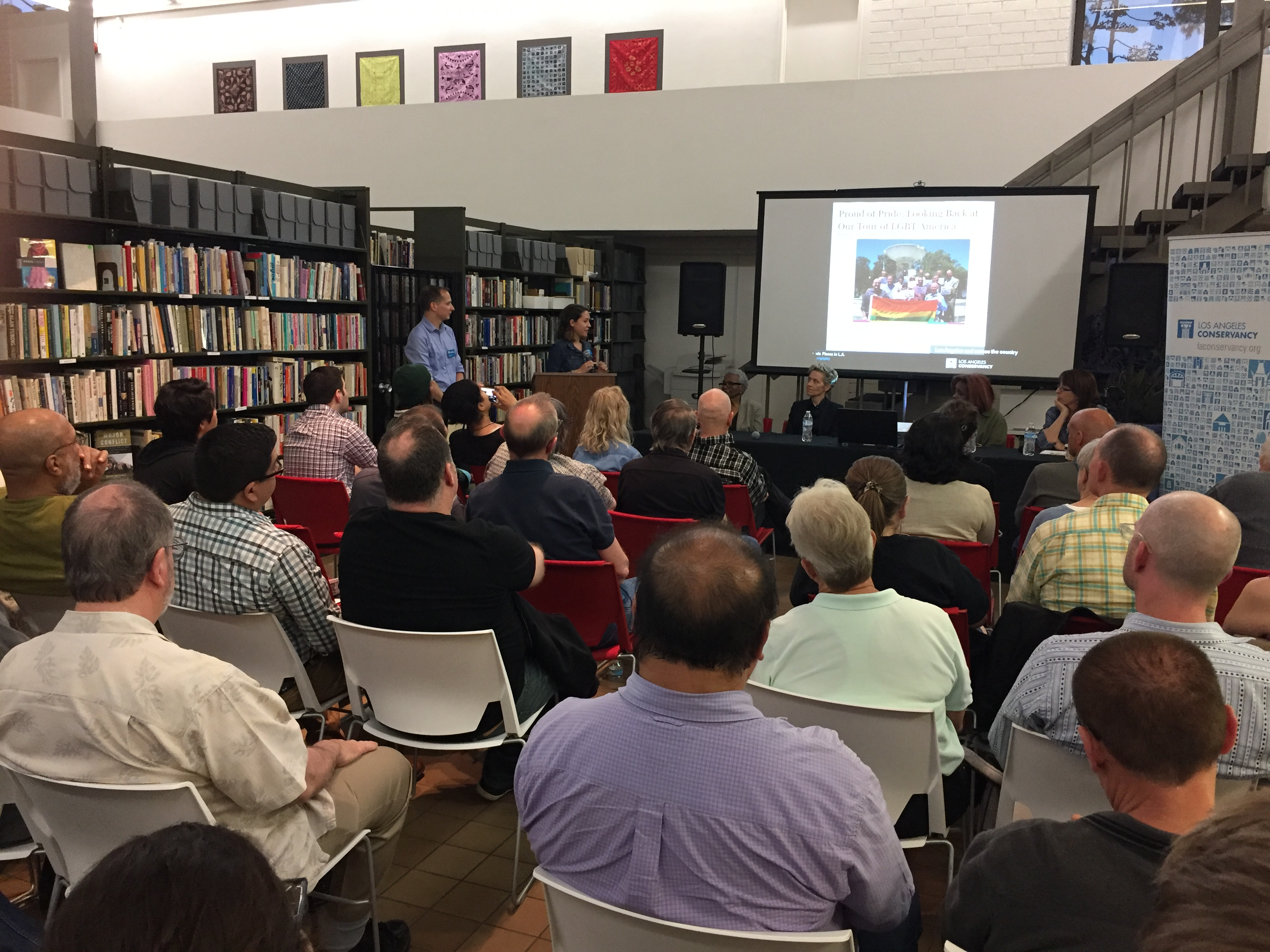
The L.A. Conservancy's "LGBTQ Historic Places in L.A. Screening and Panel Conversation" at ONE Archives in April 2017.

Since the 1980s, the archival collections have grown substantially as gay issues and gay culture became more integrated into the mainstream culture of the United States.

In 1995, the Los Angeles Times reported that the University of Southern California (USC) had become home to one of the world’s largest gay archives through the merger of two major Los Angeles collections: the ONE Institute and the International Gay and Lesbian Archives. Together containing about two million items, including books, newspapers, and political materials, the article noted that these archives trace their origins to 1942 and document decades of LGBTQ+ history and culture. The move marked a milestone in academia’s acceptance of gay studies, providing scholars access to a comprehensive record of the gay experience. USC’s acquisition was expected to strengthen research in the growing field of gay and lesbian studies, which by the mid-1990s was being offered at dozens of American universities.

In 2010, One Institute officially donated the collections to the University of Southern California, establishing ONE Archives at the USC Libraries as a division of the USC Libraries system. The One Institute, renamed in 2023, now operates as an entirely independent organization that does not directly support the collections or mission of ONE Archives at the USC Libraries.

== Organizational timeline ==
The institutional history of ONE reveals a set of complex, overlapping and groundbreaking activities that provided a wide variety of pioneering services to LGBTQ Americans:

- October 1952: The idea of a magazine for homosexuals is first discussed in a Mattachine Society meeting.
- November 1952: ONE, Inc. is founded.
- January 1953: The first issue of ONE Magazine is published.
- August/September 1953: The Los Angeles postal authorities seize the August edition of ONE Magazine. The issue, which bore the title "Homosexual Marriage?" on the cover, is released three weeks later without explanation.
- November 1953: ONE Inc. opens an office in downtown Los Angeles at 232 South Hill Street.
- October 1954: The Los Angeles postal authorities seize the October issues of ONE Magazine on charges of obscenity.
- 1956: The ONE Institute for Homophile Studies opens.
- January 13, 1958: After four years of litigation, the Supreme Court declares ONE Magazine is not in violation of obscenity laws.
- 1962: ONE Inc. moves to 2256 Venice Boulevard.
- 1967: ONE Magazine ceases publication.
- 1975: Jim Kepner's personal archive is named the Western Gay Archives.
- 1979: The Western Gay Archives is renamed the National Gay Archives: Natalie Barney/Edward Carpenter Library and moves to 1654 North Hudson Avenue in Hollywood.
- August 1981: ONE Institute becomes the first institution of higher learning in the United States to offer masters and doctoral degrees in Homophile Studies.
- 1983: ONE Inc. moves into the Milbank Estate at 3340 Country Club Drive purchased by philanthropist Reed Erickson. Soon after, for reasons uncertain, Erickson seeks to have ONE removed from the estate.
- 1984: The National Gay Archives is renamed the International Gay & Lesbian Archives (IGLA).
- 1988: IGLA moves to a space owned by the City of West Hollywood at 626 North Robertson Boulevard (the current location of the ONE Archives Gallery & Museum).
- 1994: W. Dorr Legg dies. ONE Inc. merges with the IGLA and becomes primarily an LGBTQ archive; the organization refers to itself as ONE Institute and ONE Institute/IGLA.
- 1997: Jim Kepner dies.
- 2000: ONE Institute/IGLA moves to its current location at 909 West Adams Boulevard provided by the University of Southern California.
- 2004: The organization is renamed ONE National Gay & Lesbian Archives.
- 2010: The collections at ONE Archives become a part of the USC Libraries.
- 2011: ONE Archives organizes the multi-site exhibition Cruising the Archive: Queer Art and Culture in Los Angeles, 1945–1980 as a part of the initiative Pacific Standard Time: Art in L.A., 1945–1980.
- 2017: ONE Archives organizes the major exhibition Axis Mundo: Queer Networks in Chicano L.A. in collaboration with the Museum of Contemporary Art, Los Angeles, as a part of the initiative Pacific Standard Time: LA/LA.
- 2024: ONE Archives organizes the major exhibition Sci-fi, Magick, Queer L.A.: Sexual Science and the Imagi-Nation at the USC Fisher Museum of Art as a part of the initiative PST ART: Art and Science Collide.
- 2025 Paul D. Lerner and Stephen Reis donated $2.5 million to the ONE Archives at the USC Libraries to establish and permanently endow the position of ONE Archives Director.

== Collections ==
The collections at ONE Archives are primarily national in scope, with special focus on LGBTQ histories in the Los Angeles region. The archives also include a number of international materials, such as archival records and rare publications.

=== Archival collections ===
ONE houses over 600 archival collections of personal papers from activists, artists and ordinary citizens, as well as records from LGBTQ political, social, educational and cultural organizations. The collections include a wide array of materials such as manuscripts, photographs, letters, graphics, and other historically significant materials.

Important archival collections of note include:

- ACT UP/Los Angeles Records
- The Advocate Records
- Ivy Bottini Papers
- Hal Call Papers
- Christopher Street Liberation Day Committee (New York, N.Y.) Collection
- Jeanne Córdova Papers and Photographs
- DignityUSA Records
- Reed Erickson Papers
- Bob Flanagan and Sheree Rose Papers
- Gay Sunshine Records
- Henry Gerber Collection
- Harry Hay Papers
- Homophile Effort for Legal Protection, Incorporated (HELP, Inc.) Records
- Laud Humphreys Papers
- Janus Society Records
- Michael Kearns Papers
- Jim Kepner Papers
- Morris Kight Papers and Photograph
- Los Angeles Gay and Lesbian Center Records
- Lambda Literary Foundation Records
- W. Dorr Legg Personal Papers
- Mattachine Society Project Collection
- National March on Washington for Lesbian and Gay Rights Records
- ONE, Inc. Records
- Outfest Records
- Personal Rights in Defense and Education (PRIDE) Records
- Pat Rocco Papers
- Twice Blessed Collection, circa 1966-2000 - this "consists of materials documenting the Jewish lesbian, gay, bisexual, and transgender experience, circa 1966-2000, collected by the Jewish Gay, Lesbian, Bisexual, and Transgender Archives, founded and operated by Johnny Abush."

=== Books and periodicals ===
ONE's main library collection comprises over 33,000 volumes of books and monographs; as well as over 13,000 titles of periodicals, such as magazines, newspapers, and newsletters. From issues of the earliest American LGBTQ publications to the most recent LGBTQ titles, the collection includes many rare and unusual titles, some of which may be the only copies in existence. The library also includes foreign publications in more than 40 different languages.

=== Audiovisual ===
ONE's collection of audiovisual materials includes over 4,000 films, 21,000 videos (including 10 years of recorded lectures from ONE, Inc.), and 3,000 audio recordings. Many of ONE's films and videos are stored and preserved in conjunction with the Outfest Legacy Project at the UCLA Film and Television Archive.

=== Art and photography ===
ONE Archives' art collection include over 4,000 paintings, drawings, works on paper, photographs, and sculptural objects, the majority of which date from the 1940s to the present.

=== Posters, textiles, and objects ===
ONE Archives also collects and houses over 3,500 posters; textiles, such as T-shirts, banners and flags; and memorabilia such as buttons, matchbooks, dolls and other three-dimensional objects.

== Exhibitions ==
In 2008, the One Institute founded an off-site exhibition space in West Hollywood, California called the ONE Archives Gallery & Museum (later renamed simply the ONE Gallery) dedicated to presenting temporary exhibitions on LGBTQ art and history. The gallery is located in a city-owned building that also houses the June L. Mazer Lesbian Archives. Founded prior to the donation of the collection to the USC Libraries, many gallery exhibitions highlighted the collection. ONE Archives at the USC Libraries has and continues to occasionally collaborate with One Institute to present exhibitions in this space and other venues.

In 2011, ONE Archives participated in the region-wide Pacific Standard Time: Art in L.A., 1945-1980 initiative with the exhibition Cruising the Archive: Queer Art & Culture in Los Angeles, 1945-1980 which was presented at the ONE Gallery in West Hollywood, as well as at ONE Archives' main location on West Adams Boulevard and in the Treasure Room at the Doheny Library at the University of Southern California Libraries. The exhibition included works by Steven F. Arnold, Don Bachardy, Claire Falkenstein, Anthony Friedkin, Rudi Gernreich, Sister Corita Kent, and Kate Millett, among many other less known or anonymous artists. The only exhibition dedicated to queer content within the PST initiative, this exhibition marked the most comprehensive exhibition of materials from the collections at ONE Archives to date and was accompanied by a scholarly catalogue. The publication included contributions by Ann Cvetkovich, Vaginal Davis, Jennifer Doyle, Jack Halberstam, Catherine Lord, Richard Meyer, Ulrike Müller, and Dean Spade.

In 2017, ONE Archives collaborated with the Museum of Contemporary Art, Los Angeles to co-present Axis Mundo: Queer Networks in Chicano L.A. as MOCA's Pacific Design Center location and the ONE Gallery. Curated by C. Ondine Chavoya and David Evans Frantz, the exhibition highlighted a generation of queer and Chicano artists, including Laura Aguilar, Mundo Meza, Roberto Gil de Montes, Joey Terrill, and Gerardo Velazquez, among others.

The ONE Gallery has presented solo exhibitions of artwork by Steven F. Arnold and Joey Terrill, exhibitions of historical materials from the collections at ONE, and highlights from the collections of the Tom of Finland Foundation and the Center for the Study of Political Graphics.

== See also ==
- Mattachine Society
- LGBT history
- LGBT culture in Los Angeles
- Leather Archives & Museum
- Tom of Finland Foundation
- IHLIA LGBT Heritage in Amsterdam, the Netherlands
