= The J-Gos =

American avant-rock band

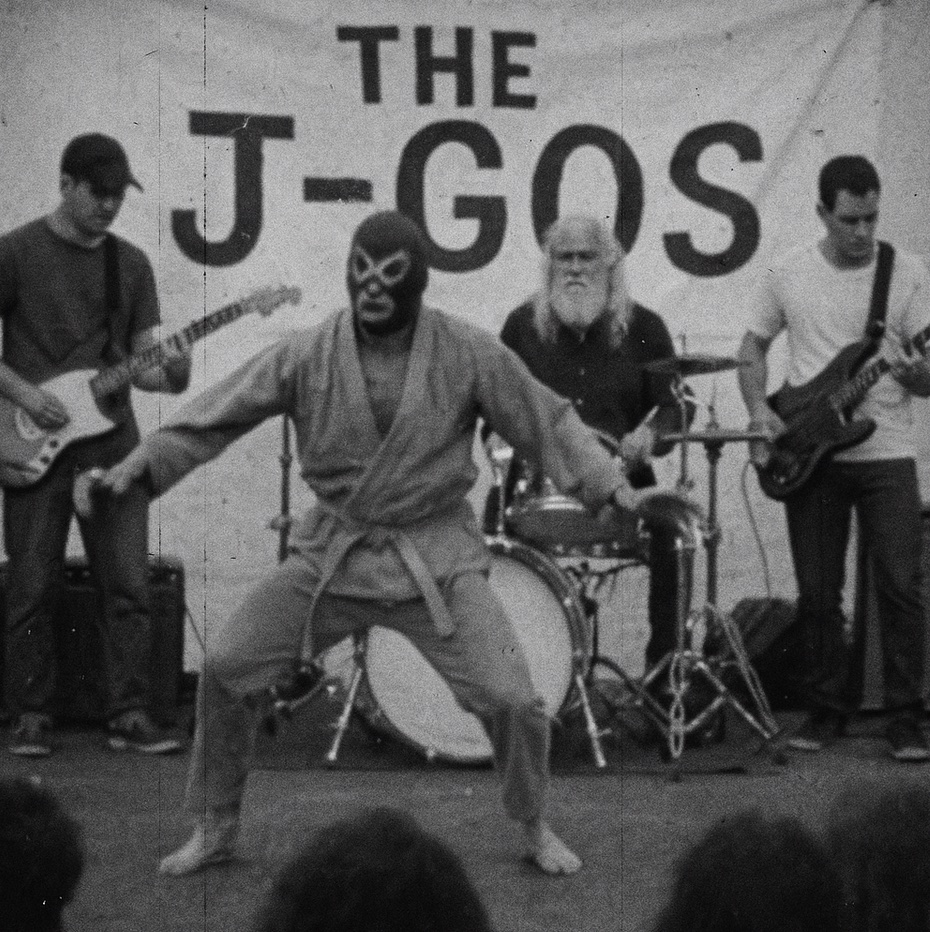

Background information
- Origin: Venice, California, United States
- Genres: Avant-rock, post-punk, shoegaze
- Years active: 1991-2002
- Past members: The Mysterious Canadian; Hippie Johnny; Piano Pete; Jack On Drums (1991-98)

The J-Gos were an alternative, experimental Venice, Los Angeles-based musical group of the 1990s, who developed local notoriety and acclaim from their unusual, challenging live performances at various local music venues.

== History ==
The band was described as "more notorious than critically acclaimed" but "there is little doubt that the avant-rock style of the J-Go's has become the signature sound of Venice Beach these last few years; no other area band comes close." Their influences included bands like Young Marble Giants, Slovenly, and Red Krayola. The group's members did not use their real names, performing under the aliases The Mysterious Canadian, Hippie Johnny, Piano Pete, and Jack On Drums.

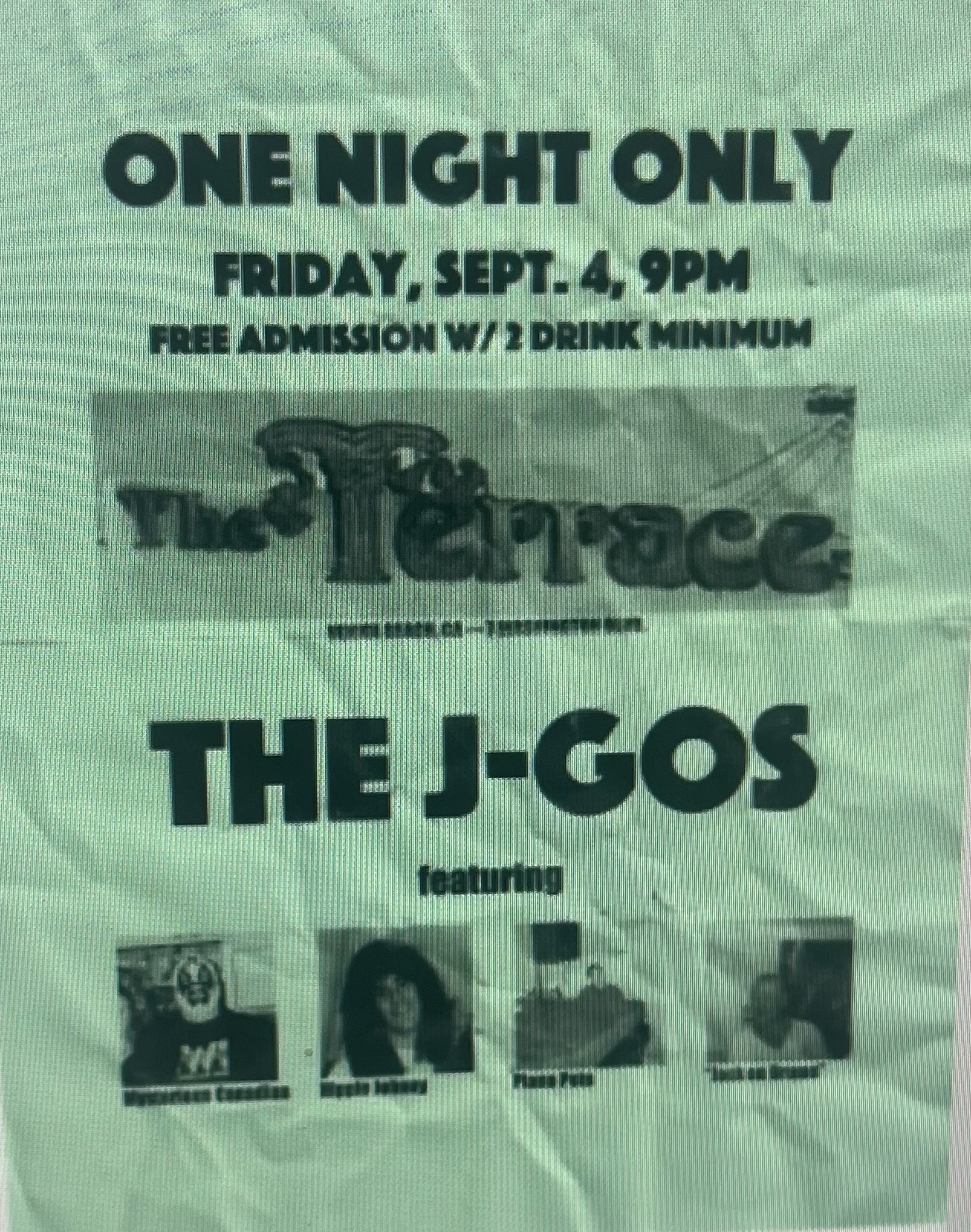
A flier from a J-Gos performance at the Terrace

They were described by the Los Angeles Village View as "provocateurs of the night. Their fans dress in elaborate costumes, straddling a fine line between mimicry and mockery. Almost like Schrödinger's cat, it's as if the more you try to observe the J-Gos, the less you find -- or at least the less confident you are that you understand it all." The Venice Vanguard called their music "familiar yet exotic." A purely instrumental band, they nevertheless were led by a lead performer, the Mysterious Canadian, who in shaman-like style danced on stage in "otherworldly fashion" in a wrestling mask and judo gi.

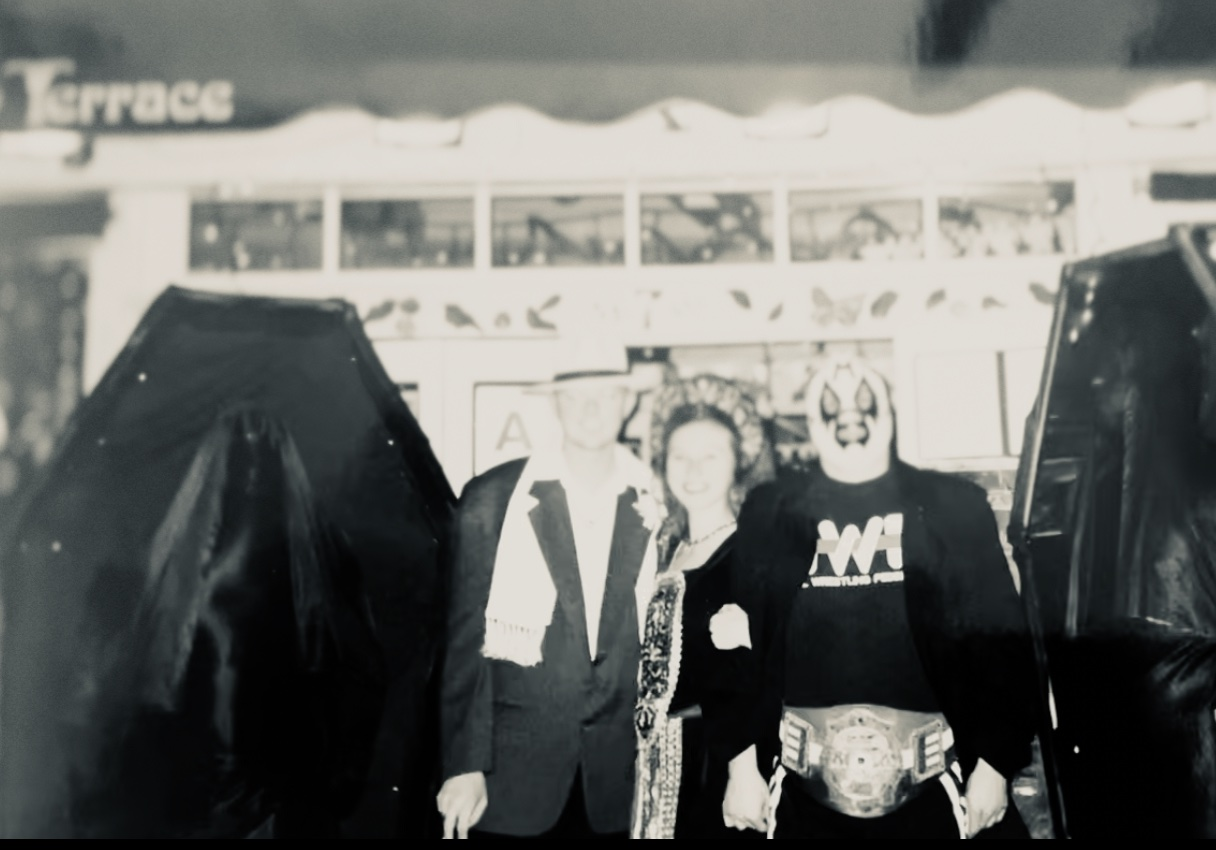
Mysterious Canadian meeting some fans after a gig at the Terrace, circa 1996

In addition to avant rock, the band was associated with the musique concrète, Bakersfield sound, dungeon synth, Viking metal, skiffle, post-precore, and gothabilly genres and subcultures.

The band refused to sign with a major record label, instead encouraging their fans to make and trade tapes from their live shows, much like The Grateful Dead. They frequently performed at local music venues such as The Terrace Cafe, Big Dean's, and Hinano. They became especially synonymous with The Terrace Cafe, a local institution that lasted for 72 years before closing in 2019, a venue that was "prized by locals" and known for its "arty crowd." In one notorious incident at The Terrace, the band threw clear bags ostensibly filled with monkey excrement at their fans (it was really chocolate pudding), in protest of Venice's recently increased garbage collection tax. The band attempted to record the incident on video, but Terrace owner Vladimir Rodzai quashed the attempt by threatening to break their camera, only relenting when local vigilantes Eric Stowell, Sid Weiss, and Heather O'Green intervened.

Notable fans of the group included local characters Harry Perry and "Boston Dawna" Chaet, actors Tom Poston, Jason Robards, David Bradley, Richard Brooker, and Florence Henderson, and comedian George Carlin.

The band's only known contemporaneous LP was the self-titled The J-Gos (1996), which is long out of print and is now considered a collector's item. The band released two albums of its 1990s material in the 2020s. The liner notes to their first such release, Venice Beach Brass, described the music as

"Venice Beach's soundtrack in an era before today's gentrification changed it forever. A lively stew of street performers, free spirits, and eclectic artists, the historic beach town also had a darker side. The J-Gos captured all of the town's moods as its inhabitants strove to create and survive in a rapidly changing world."

The decline of the J-Gos coincided with the gentrification of Venice, its transition from "a place that celebrated barefoot living in low-slung wooden cottages" to "a suburban idyll for hi-tech executives at nearby Silicon Beach."

Venice Beach Brass charted on the popular music charts of Papua New Guinea.

The name of their 2023 album, Never Mind the Stroganoff, It's the J-Gos, simultaneously serves as a parody of the Sex Pistols album Never Mind the Bollocks, Here's the Sex Pistols, and a tribute to a popular dish at the Terrace, Vladimir's Stroganoff.

== Discography ==
Studio albums

- The J-Gos (eponymous) (1996) (bootleg, out-of-print)
- Venice Beach Brass (2021)
- Never Mind the Stroganoff, It's the J-Gos (2023)
