= Connexxus Women's Center/Centro de Mujeres =

Former American community organization

- Formation: 1985
- Dissolved: 1991
- Type: Non-profit
- Headquarters: West Hollywood, California, United States

Connexxus Women's Center/Centro de Mujeres was a non-profit community organization established in January 1985 in West Hollywood, California. The organization was co-founded by Adel Martinez and Lauren Jardine in 1984 as a women-run center in Los Angeles, and provided services that catered to women, particularly lesbians and a space in which lesbians could thrive professionally, personally, and socially. In January 1988, it opened an additional facility in East Los Angeles named Connexxus East/Centro de Mujeres made for outreach to the Latina and Chicana communities. The new facility provided services primarily to lesbians in Los Angeles County, and facilitated information about and access to various human service agencies. It also provided counseling in developing and operating small businesses. The facility also sponsored and hosted cultural and educational activities. The 1,400 square-foot center contained space for a library, workshops, rap groups, counseling meetings, and social activities.

== History ==
Connexxus ran from May 1984 to June 1990. When it was open, the organization was led by members of the lesbian community, such as Jeanne Córdova, Jodi Curlee, Judy Doyle, Lauren Jardine, Bunny MacCulloch, Del Martinez, June Mazer, Yolanda Retter, and Jane Wagner. In order to sustain the organization the board raised over $20,000 for its operations. It received grants from the National Endowment for the Arts, the California Arts Council, Colling Higgins Foundation, and the Liberty Hill Foundation.

The Connexxus Women's Center/Centro de Mujeres was officially dissolved in 1991. In a letter to the community on January 18, 1990, they shared that as Connexxus expanded and their work surpassed their intended goals, more human service organizations followed their lead and expanded their services too. Due to the increasing number of specialized groups, services, and businesses, fewer lesbians accessed the center's services. Due to this fall in numbers and an imminent financial crisis, Connexxus closed its doors on June 30, 1990.

== Programs ==
=== Economic empowerment ===
In May 1998, the then-President of the United States, Bill Clinton, issued Executive Order 13087, banning discrimination in federal civilian employment on the basis of sexual orientation. Six years earlier in 1992, governor Pete Wilson signed AB 2601, which outlawed employment discrimination against gays and lesbians in California (he vetoed a similar bill, AB 101, the year before).

Connexxus hosted economic empowerment workshops to support women's skill development.

=== The Alliance ===
Beginning January 1985, Connexxus published a newsletter by its Connexxus Business & Professional Women's Alliance. The newsletter ceased publication in June 1990.

=== June L. Mazer Lesbian Collections ===
The June L. Mazer Lesbian Collections began as the West Coast Lesbian Collections (WCLC) in 1980, in Oakland, California, in the private home of a lesbian couple. As the WCLC grew it became increasingly difficult to maintain and the decision was made to find another location for it. Connexxus Women's Center agreed to sponsor its relocation. June Mazer and her partner Bunny MacCulloch, both members of Connexxus and lesbian organization Southern California Women for Understanding, agreed to be the guardians of WCLC and it was moved to their home in Southern California. After the death of June Mazer in 1987, WCLC was renamed the June L. Mazer Lesbian Collections (JMLC).

Two years before Connexxus dissolved, the City of West Hollywood agreed to give JMLC a permanent home in a city-owned property known as the Werle Building. Afterwards, the collection was rebranded as the June L. Mazer Lesbian Archives. Through an equitable partnership with the UCLA Library Special Collections, the Mazer Archives retained rights to its collection while increasing public access through digitization.

=== Community events ===
Because Connexxus was intended to be a community space, it hosted a variety of events and fundraisers. Social groups based on identities, such as dykes, black lesbians, singles, Latinas, and mixers were common. The most popular was "All Around Town" in 1988, which doubled as a fundraiser. Another popular event, sponsored by Connexxus, was a photography exhibition by Chicana lesbian photographer Laura Aguilar, called the Latina Lesbian series.
