= Knights of the Clock =

Interracial homophile social club based in Los Angeles

The Cloistered Order of Conclaved Knights of Sophisticracy, more commonly known as the Knights of the Clock, was an interracial homophile social club based in Los Angeles, California. The Knights were founded by Merton Bird, an African-American man, and W. Dorr Legg, his white lover. Sources differ as to the founding date of the organization, variously citing it as 1949, 1950, and 1951. Regardless of the exact date, the Knights was one of the earliest gay organizations in the United States, with only the Society for Human Rights (established 1924), the Veterans Benevolent Association (established 1945) and possibly the Mattachine Society (established 1950) pre-dating it.

The Knights were primarily a social club, including people of both sexes and family members of couples. They also tried to address social problems that affected interracial couples, including employment counseling and locating integrated housing for same-sex couples. To that end, the Knights discussed the possibility of establishing communes throughout its existence, although no such communes were ever established.

Although social functions routinely attracted as many as 200 participants, at its core the Knights always remained a numerically small group and eventually disbanded in the mid-1950s. Several Knights, including Bird and Legg, went on to join ONE, Inc., another early homophile organization. Sociologist Laud Humphreys cited the Knights as an example of the ability of people of different races to cross racial barriers through commonality of sexual identification.
