= Michael Drescher =

American entrepreneur and philanthropist

- Born: July 14, 1954 (age 72); Maplewood, New Jersey, U.S.
- Education: University of Wisconsin–Madison; Boston College
- Occupations: Entrepreneur; investor; speaker; writer; philanthropist

Michael Drescher (born July 14, 1954) is an entrepreneur, social impact investor, TEDx speaker, writer, and philanthropist.

== Early life and education ==
Drescher was born in Maplewood, New Jersey. One of three children to James and Peggy (McKenna) Drescher, the family moved to Milwaukee, Wisconsin, in 1962, where he spent the remainder of his childhood. Drescher attended University of Wisconsin–Madison and Boston College, where he studied business marketing and theatre.

== Entrepreneur ==
In 1981 he co-founded JDTV, a multimedia and production company that built up the world's largest database of interactive television and movie descriptions in 11 languages with an international distribution. Privately held JDTV was sold to Tribune Media Services in 1999. It was said that through that sale, JDTV would offer competition to TV Guide and added 4 million subscribers. In 1997, he established Drescher Holdings and in 2003, along with DHL, became co-founder, partner and director of global publishing for One World Yellow Pages. In 2010, he co-founded two companies: Okanjo's SAAS marketplace and ad-tech platforms that transform content into commerce for publishers, and Vibrant Body Company, a product line focusing on women's breast health. In 2015, TechCrunch described Okanjo's technology as an alternative to the growing-in-popularity native advertising. That same year, the startup raised $1.7 million in follow-on funding Okanjo's “Product Match” feature allows any site to add a “buy it now” feature and is often compared to Facebook. The locally-driven site has been praised for its simplicity and transparency. In January 2015, Okanjo raised another $1.7 million in what was speculated to lead to a venture capital round. Drescher serves on the board of directors for Newaukee, Okanjo Partners, Vibrant LLC, MiKE and International Film Finance.

== Acting career ==
In 2004, Drescher wrote and performed a one-man, autobiographical, spiritual comedy show in Los Angeles entitled “18 Arrests, No Convictions”. The story followed a boy who sees angels and goes on a journey from NBA ball boy who unsuccessfully pursued a diploma at seven colleges, to a powerful businessman who closes multimillion-dollar business deals with Time Warner, Disney, and Microsoft. All proceeds went to the nonprofit, One Tribe. The play was shown Off-Broadway in 2016. He is currently producing a documentary on the making of “We Are The World,” called “One Night. One Song. One World.” The documentary is co-produced and directed by Chip Duncan.

Drescher continues to invest in and produce socially impactful theatrical and film productions in both New York City and Los Angeles. He serves on the board of directors for the Culture Project and the Lynn Redgrave Theater in New York. In film, Drescher has served as executive producer in “The Dry Spell” and “Hamlet A.D.D.” and acted in “China Test Girls." Off-Broadway, he co-produced “Strange Fruit on Rye,” which won the 2007 NAACP Spirit Award for Best Lead Male and Best Adapted Screenplay. On Broadway, he produced “Million Dollar Quartet,” which garnered him a Tony nomination.

== Philanthropy ==
In 2008, Drescher developed Vibrant LLC, a firm that focuses on social impact investing. He is co-founder of BrightStar Wisconsin Foundation, a groundbreaking philanthropic approach to support job creation and economic growth across Wisconsin. The non-profit pledged $7 million its first year with a goal of $60 million. He was also a founding donor to the Brico Forward Fund to help Milwaukee's filmmaking community. In 2015, the fund provided $50,000 in cash and $76,000 in production services for local filmmaking projects.

== Social work ==
Drescher supports social impact groups that focus on job creation, economic growth, innovative fashion for health wellness, and arts that generate and inspire a public dialog. These groups include: Feminine Weapon, Underfashion Club of New York, The Femimy Awards New York, TJ Martell Foundation Los Angeles, Heal the Bay Santa Monica, Boys & Girls Clubs of America, Milwaukee Film Festival (where he often talks on panels about the entrepreneurial spirit of filmmaking), College Possible Milwaukee, Breast Cancer Showcase Wis., Ronald McDonald Wis.

== Personal life ==
Drescher is a 50-year resident of Milwaukee and continues to split his time between New York, Malibu, and Milwaukee.

== Recognition and honors ==
He was nominated for a Tony Award in 2010 for his work as co-producer of “Million Dollar Quartet” He also won a CTAM Mark Award (for Time Warner Cable Milwaukee) in 1995, 1996 and 1998.
