= EYP =

EYP may refer to:

- European Youth Parliament, commonly referred to as EYP
- Hellenic National Intelligence Service (Greek: Ethniki Ypiresia Pliroforion)
- El Alcaraván Airport, also known as El Yopal Airport - (IATA code EYP)
- Export Yellow Pages
- Early Years Professional Status
- EYP Hotchkiss, a modification of the M1926 Hotchkiss machine gun
