= The Angriest Dog in the World =

American comic strip by David Lynch

- "It doesn't get any better than this"
- Author: David Lynch
- Current status/schedule: Ended
- Launch date: 1983
- End date: 1992
- Syndicate(s): LA Reader
- Genre(s): Humor, absurd humor

The Angriest Dog in the World is a 1983–1992 comic strip created by film director David Lynch.

== Background ==
The strip was conceived by Lynch in 1973 during a period when he was experiencing feelings of great anger. First published in the LA Reader, the strip ran from 1983 until 1992. It was also serialised in the comics anthology Cheval Noir.

Each strip is introduced with a small caption:

The dog who is so angry he cannot move. He cannot eat. He cannot sleep. He can just barely growl. Bound so tightly with tension and anger, he approaches the state of rigor mortis.

Visually each strip is the same. The first three identical panels feature the black dog growling, tied to a post in a yard by a chain. He is between a tree on the left and one wall of a house with a window on the right. The fourth panel is the same, but at night with a circle of light coming from the house's window.

A full strip in The Angriest Dog in the World series

A word balloon appears in one or more of the panels, indicating speech from a member of one of the house's unseen family, either Bill, Sylvia, Pete or Billy Jr. Usually the speech is in the form of an aphorism or a non sequitur. Such sayings include "If everything is real... then nothing is real as well", and "It doesn't get any better than this."

In a short essay on Lynch's Rabbits, Objectif Cinema notes:

David Lynch has of course used animals within his back catalogue of work before. Dogs for instance feature in nearly every one of his movies usually as a visual prop: who could forget the scene in Wild at Heart in which our canine friend scampers away with the Bank teller's severed hand? Or the mewling pups in Mary X's living room in Eraserhead? Indeed a dog, albeit in cartoon form, took centre stage in Lynch's cartoon series for the LA Reader, The Angriest Dog in the World. But it is here on his website that Lynch seems to be opening up more to the wonders of nature: Bees, Coyotes and Dead Mice all have a part to play in various guises and manifestations within www.davidlynch.com, and as part of the pay-per-view series, the Rabbit has been given the starring role.

== Collected edition ==
In September of 2020, the first official reprinting of The Angriest Dog in the World, approved by David Lynch, was edited by Ryan Standfest and published by Rotland Press, collecting 17 of the original strips. Limited to 500 copies, it featured new lettering to match Lynch's handwriting and a foreword by Michel Chion.

== Homages ==
- In 2003, the strip was parodied by cartoonist Ted Rall with his comic The Angriest Liberal in the World.
- In 2004, the clip-art comic Dinosaur Comics, which similarly uses the same sequence of illustrations in every strip, made a direct reference to The Angriest Dog in the World.
- In 2016, Homestar Runner episode "Later That Night..." had The Cheat dressed as The Angriest Dog in the World for Halloween.
