= Global Publishers =

Global Publishers is an international publisher of print and online yellow pages directories. Global is a privately held company based in Glendale, Wisconsin. Global Publishers is home to The Export Yellow Pages and One World Yellow Pages.

The Export Yellow Pages is a public-private partnership of Global Publishers and the United States Department of Commerce that came together to provide U.S. companies, exporters and service providers a simple, fast, and convenient way to engage in export promotion and establish international contacts and conduct business and trade around the globe. The Export Yellow Pages is administered by the Export Trading Company Affairs, International Trade Administration. The Export Yellow Pages and U.S. Trade Assistance Directory are published online and annually in print and distributed through Department of Commerce district offices and U.S. embassies and consulates worldwide as well as trade centers and associations both domestically and internationally.

One World Yellow Pages is a global B2B yellow pages directory that was launched by Global Publishers in April 2008 to support the needs of SMBs engaged in domestic and international commerce. The One World Yellow Pages contains comprehensive business product and supplier information, and is designed to promote and connect small and medium-sized companies, solve language barriers, improve market visibility, simplify sales sourcing, and provide businesses with global trade resources in a single location.

Global Publishers continues to expand its directory product set by working on search technologies and directory-platforms that offer global and local b2b search, communication, promotion, and commerce tools to SMBs worldwide.

According to data released by the Yellow Pages Association, yellow pages usage grew to 17.2 billion searches in 2007, up from 16.7 billion in 2006. Notably, print usage remained stable with 13.4 billion print yellow pages references—the same as 2006.

== See also ==
- Export
- Trade
- U.S. & Foreign Commercial Service
- International trade
- List of countries by exports
