= Lesbian Tide =

Periodical

- April 1973 cover
- Editor: Jeanne Córdova
- Categories: Lesbian, feminism, politics
- Frequency: Bimonthly
- Publisher: Daughters of Bilitis and Jeanne Córdova
- First issue: 1971
- Final issue: 1980
- Country: United States
- Language: English

The Lesbian Tide (1971–1980) was a lesbian periodical published in the United States by the Los Angeles chapter of the Daughters of Bilitis. It was the first lesbian periodical in the US to reach a national audience and the first US magazine to use the word "lesbian" in the title.

== History ==
The Lesbian Tide originated in 1971 as the newsletter for the Los Angeles chapter of the Daughters of Bilitis (DOB), a national lesbian rights organization, and was called the LA DOB Newsletter. The newsletter was run by young members of the DOB and their radical political stance created a rift between the editors and older, less radical members of the DOB. In December 1972, the newspaper formally split from the DOB and, with a change in title to the Lesbian Tide, it became an independent publication with Jeanne Córdova (a former DOB member) as editor.

When the Tide expanded its distribution from the Los Angeles region to other U.S. cities, it became the first national lesbian newspaper. Córdova's ambition was to create a newspaper that was as widely circulated as The Advocate, which at the time was targeted towards a gay male audience. The Lesbian Tide struggled financially, however, and at one point its editors published a message to their readers: "WE ARE FLAT BROKE! PLEASE SEND MONEY!" Ultimately, the newspaper ceased publication in 1980.

The Tide's content was not purely lesbian-related; it also appealed to the broader feminist movement of the time and advertised services such as the Alcoholism Center for Women and sex therapy workshops. Wiccan feminist Cerridwen Fallingstar contributed to the magazine in the late 1970s, under her birth name Cheri Lesh.

== Importance ==
The Lesbian Tide was the United States' first national lesbian newspaper. Writing for The Advocate, Diane Anderson-Minshall said that Córdova and the newspaper's other writers "helped usher in the era of advocacy journalism ... It wasn't propaganda, but it wasn't quiet, just-the-facts-ma'am reporting either."

In April 1973, the staff of the Lesbian Tide organized and hosted the West Coast Lesbian Conference in Los Angeles. The magazine's writers were also outspoken in their opposition of proposed censorship and obscenity laws in California, which they felt were homophobic and antifeminist.

Lesbian Tide was "the newspaper of record for the lesbian feminist decade" (1970–1980), ranked "highest in the criteria of journalistic excellence," and notable as the first American magazine to use the word "lesbian" in its title.
