= New Times LA =

Los Angeles weekly paper 1996–2002

- Type: Alternative weekly
- Format: Tabloid
- Owner: New Times Media
- Editor: Rick Barrs
- Founded: August 22, 1996; 30 years ago
- Ceased publication: 2002; 24 years ago
- Website: lanewtimes.com

New Times LA was an alternative weekly newspaper that was published in Los Angeles, California by New Times Media from 1996 to 2002.

== History ==
New Times LA was formed on August 22, 1996, by the purchase and merger of the Los Angeles View and the Los Angeles Reader. The staff members of both papers were fired during the formation of the paper.

The editor-in-chief for its entire run was Rick Barrs. Writer Jill Stewart was the paper's controversial political columnist.

Los Angeles Magazine stated that the New Times Los Angeles "blasted" the LA Weekly "as often as it remembered to—calling its staff dunderheads, beret wearers, throwbacks, and ass kissers. That's the nice stuff." Howard Blume of the LA Weekly stated that the New Times LA was "a quirky and inconsistent, yet valuable, journalistic voice". Los Angeles Magazine stated that the New Times Los Angeles "never got a foothold".

In 2002, New Times Media entered into a non-competition agreement with Village Voice Media, another national publisher of alternative weeklies, whereby the two companies agreed to stop publishing New Times LA (a product of New Times Media) and Cleveland Free Times (a product of Village Voice Media), so that the companies would not publish two competing newspapers in any single city. The competing paper in Los Angeles was the LA Weekly. New Times Media continues to publish other New Times-titled publications, including Miami New Times, New Times Broward-Palm Beach, and Phoenix New Times.

This agreement and phasing out of the two newspapers led to an antitrust investigation by the U.S. Department of Justice. The investigation resulted in a settlement, requiring the companies to sell off assets and the old newspapers' titles to any potential competitors.

The assets included such things as "office furniture, telephone systems", "all rights to the print and electronic archives of New Times LA publications", "permits and licenses for individual distribution racks and boxes", and "all customer lists, contracts, accounts, and credit records".

At the time of closing, 100 employees worked for the newspaper.

New Times LA's assets were bought by Southland Publishing, Inc., which publish various local newsweeklies. Among the assets included news racks, which allowed Southland to start two new papers: Los Angeles CityBeat and ValleyBeat.
