= Jim Kepner =

American journalist, author and archivist

- Born: James Lynn Kepner, Jr. c. February 1923
- Died: 15 November 1997 (aged 74); Los Angeles, California, U.S.
- Occupations: Journalist, archivist

James Lynn Kepner Jr. (1923 – 15 November 1997) was an American journalist, author, historian, archivist and leader in the gay rights movement. His work was intertwined with One, Inc. and One Magazine, and eventually contributed to the formation of the ONE National Gay & Lesbian Archives.

== Early life ==
Jim Kepner was found wrapped in newspaper under an oleander bush in Galveston, Texas, in September 1923, aged about eight months. He didn't find out he was adopted until he was nineteen. In 1942, he followed his adopted father to San Francisco, where, wandering around the libraries of the city, Kepner could not find anything objective that focused on the way he was. Later, he would record that he had been "aware of being different from age four."

== Career ==
Kepner started his career as a clerk for a railroad company in San Francisco, California, in the 1940s. He joined the Communist Party USA and wrote for a Communist newspaper in New York City, the Daily Worker. However, he was expelled from the party because of his homosexuality. Instead, he joined the Mattachine Society in Los Angeles, the main gay organization in the United States at the time.

Kepner's search for information and then community and culture led him to begin a private collection of gay-related materials unlike anything previously compiled. Upon settling in Los Angeles in the early 1950s, Kepner became an essential part of the emergence of modern gay culture through journalism, writing, activism and pioneering archival work. He became one of the main writers for ONE Magazine. Before falling out with ONE in 1961, Kepner wrote many of the magazines' articles and served as co-editor of the magazine. ONE Magazine's documents and Kepner's research materials formed the beginning of today's ONE Archives. He maintained a relationship with ONE throughout his life even as he transferred his collections to his repeatedly renamed archives (Western Gay Archives and then the National Gay Archives and later the International Gay and Lesbian Archives).

Subjects of Kepner's 1950s writings included whether there was such a thing as a "gay community," police actions against the gay community, same-sex marriage, social interaction in the gay community and a whole host of other subjects. As he wrote, he collected, and over five more decades, Kepner was able to amass enormous amounts of essential information on gay life in the United States. As HIV/AIDS ravaged thousands in the 1980s and 1990s, Kepner's efforts became essential as he recorded, memorialized, and documented the vital personal and community response to the epidemic. In a review of Kepner's 1998 book, Rough News, Daring Views: 1950s' Pioneer Gay Press Journalism, historian William Armstrong Percy III wrote, "the Gay rights movement had three remarkable pioneers. Two—Harry Hay and Dorr Legg—have long been recognized, whereas the contribution of the third—Jim Kepner—has never been adequately documented…" Percy goes on to say "Kepner's articles (in the book) record not only the past of the gay rights movement but also its soul."

Kepner's collection consists of thousands of distinct subject files containing primary and secondary materials such as organizational minutes, newspaper clippings, journal and magazine articles, correspondence, brochures, and other printed and original materials relating to all aspects of the LGBT experience. ONE's Library and Kepner's archives merged in the early 1990s. By the time of Kepner's death, the ONE Archives had evolved into the premier source for gay and lesbian research in the nation.

== Death ==
Kepner died on November 15, 1997, at the Midway Hospital in Los Angeles, California. He was 74.

== See also ==
- LGBT history
