= Stella Rush =

Stella Rush (April 30, 1925 – July 25, 2015), also known by her pen name Sten Russell, was an American journalist and LGBT rights activist. She was a regular reporter for the gay rights magazine ONE (1954–1961) and the lesbian rights magazine The Ladder (1957–1968).

== Early life and education ==
Rush was born on April 30, 1925, in Los Angeles. Her father died when she was two years old, and she spent her childhood moving repeatedly between Los Angeles and Kentucky with her mother.

She graduated from Dorsey High School in 1943.

Rush attended the University of California, Berkeley for two years and transferred to the University of California, Los Angeles for her third year; she left without graduating and took up a job at the Firestone Tire and Rubber Company.

== Political activism ==
After graduating from Dorsey High School in 1943, she worked as an aircraft draftsman for North American Aviation until 1945.

Rush's career as a gay rights activist began as a writer for ONE magazine, joining the organization in 1953. She wrote her first article, a first-person account of the Los Angeles gay scene, in 1954 under the pseudonym "Sten Russell". She was a regular reporter for ONE until 1961. She became involved with the Daughters of Bilitis (DOB), a lesbian rights organization, in 1957, and was a co-founder and treasurer of the organization's Los Angeles chapter. She and Helen Sandoz were also involved with the Circle of Loving Companions as close friends of its founders, Harry Hay and John Burnside.

=== Involvement with The Ladder ===
She served as the Los Angeles reporter for its official publication, The Ladder. She mainly reported on conferences, seminars, and new research into homosexuality, and also published poems in the magazine. She ceased working with the DOB in 1968, following the organization's merger with the National Organization for Women, because she disagreed with the rhetoric of the feminist movement and felt that the campaign for women's rights victimized men.

== Personal life ==
Rush was bisexual. She was in a relationship with Helen Sandoz for thirty years; they met in 1957 and lived together in Silver Lake, Los Angeles, until Sandoz's death in 1987.
