= Steven F. Arnold =

American multidisciplinary artist

Self Portrait (1983) by American artist Steven Arnold

Steven F. Arnold (18 May 1943 – 6 August 1994) was an American multidisciplinary artist and protégé of Salvador Dalí. He was a filmmaker, photographer, painter, illustrator, set and costume designer, and assemblage artist.

== Birth and early life ==
Steven Arnold was born on May 18, 1943, to a seamstress mother, and a hardware clerk father in Oakland, California. At four or five years old, he found a chest of theatrical costumes and make-up belonging to his uncle in the attic of his parents' house, and from then on devoted himself to the art of transformation, constantly dressing up to amuse himself, his fashion model sister, and his babysitter. His parents encouraged his fantasies, and allowed him to build sets and puppets to put on shows for the neighborhood children, to whom, he said, he never related.

In the fall of 1958 Arnold entered Oakland Technical High School, where he met his lifelong friend, muse, and collaborator, Pandora. The pair became inseparable, and would spend hours in Steven's bedroom drinking champagne and Romilar cough syrup, smoking opium, marijuana, and cigarettes, dressing up, and playing with make-up. Steven's bedroom in 1959, as Pandora remembers, was "like LOUIS XIV – beyond belief for a child". Steven and Pandora's high school art teacher, Violet Chew, was the pair's mentor and main source of inspiration. Chew taught her students by ancient Chinese methods, which worked from the inside out, encouraging students to confront problems on a soul-level, and to use their art as a means of exploring and solving these problems. She also introduced the young Steven to antique and junk shopping, art history, cutting-edge fashion, and Eastern spiritual traditions, which made a lasting impact on Arnold's philosophy and art. She saw great potential in her student, and arranged for Arnold to drop homeroom and physical education in order to spend three periods with her each day. It was also around this time that Violet Chew's friend, artist Ira Yeager, noticed that "it was Steven who actually initiated ‘hippie’ dress in San Francisco, before it was fashionable."

== Higher education and film work ==
After graduating from high school in the spring of 1961, Arnold won a full scholarship to the San Francisco Art Institute. In the summer of 1963, after earning perfect grades for two years at the Institute, Arnold took a break to study abroad in Paris and enrolled at École des Beaux-Arts. Feeling confined by the stiff, traditional curriculum at École des Beaux-Arts, Arnold and a group of American classmates rented villas on the small island of Formentera off the coast of Spain. For the next several months the group lived communally, taking LSD every day, experimenting with paints and costumes, taking up residence in caves, and exploring the small island. Arnold recalls: “This new drug was so euphoric and visionary, so positive and mind expanding… I ascended to another dimension, one so beautiful and spiritual that I was never the same.” Arnold also began keeping sketchbooks around this time, a practice he maintained throughout his life.

A still from Steven F. Arnold's film, Luminous Procuress, featuring his lifelong friend, model, and muse, Pandora.

Returning to San Francisco in the fall of 1964, Arnold resumed his studies at the San Francisco Art Institute, turning his eye on film-making. He wrote, directed, and designed three short films over the next two years. By late 1967 Arnold was about to receive his BFA, and his final student film, Messages, Messages (starring Ruth Weiss), was drawing critical attention. The film went on to win invites to Cannes' Directors' Fortnight, the Chicago International Film Festival, and the Toronto International Film Festival. Due to the critical success of their film, Arnold and collaborator Michael Wiese decided that Messages, Messages was worthy of a more elaborate hometown premiere than the San Francisco Art Institute could provide. So in February 1968, shortly before their graduation, the pair rented the Palace Theatre in San Francisco's North Beach for the occasion. In addition to Messages, Messages, Arnold also curated "a rare collection of early surrealist films by Man Ray, Melies, and old French animations." The evening was such a success that the theater owner offered to allow Arnold to continue holding screenings. This led to the March 1969 inauguration of Arnold's Nocturnal Dreamshows, the first of the weekly midnight movie showcases that became nationally popular in the 1970s. The Nocturnal Dreamshows also launched The Cockettes, a psychedelic San Francisco drag troupe, into underground fame. Since 1967, Arnold had also been illustrating posters for local businesses, and was among the original group of rock poster artists in San Francisco, creating some of the first rock posters for the famed Matrix nightclub, which was later credited for originating the "San Francisco sound" of the psychedelic ’60s.

In 1970, while finishing his MFA at San Francisco Art Institute, Arnold began filming Luminous Procuress, which went on to win him the 1972 New Director's award at the San Francisco International Film Festival, an extended exhibition at the Whitney Museum of American Art, and a second invite to Cannes’ Director's Fortnight. Salvador Dalí was so impressed with the film that he arranged a private screening at the St. Regis Hotel, to which he invited New York's elite, including Andy Warhol, who also praised the film's genius. Arnold became a favorite of Dalí's, and in 1974 he went to study with Dali in Spain, helping Dali to embellish and inaugurate his Teatro-Museo Dalí. Dalí dubbed Arnold the 'prince' of his Court of Miracles, which included other counter-culture icons such as Donyale Luna, Andy Warhol superstar Ultra Violet, Amanda Lear, Marianne Faithfull, David Bowie and Mick Jagger.

== Tableau photography, paintings, and assemblage ==
Dressed for Dalí, a tableau-vivant by American artist Steven Arnold.

After returning to California, and failing to make any progress on other film projects, Arnold was driven to find new modes of expression. So he established his Los Angeles photography studio and west coast salon, Zanzibar. From 1982 to 1989, Arnold found his niche, designing and shooting tableau-vivants for four books; he left thousands of living tableau photographs and negatives unpublished. He nurtured close friendships with kindred spirits such as actress Ellen Burstyn and Simon Doonan. Arnold adored the vast cross-section of society represented at his nightly Salons, but also culled inspiration from his dreams, world religions, sexuality, fine art masterpieces, Jungian archetypes, social attitudes, excess, and artifice, working all night, and waking each afternoon to sketch dreams and visions into his growing collection of sketchbooks. In addition to his photography, Arnold also translated these his drawings into a large body of paintings and assemblage sculpture between 1990 and his death in 1994.

== Death ==
Arnold was diagnosed with AIDS in 1988 at the height of his popularity and died in 1994. His works are in the collections of the Whitney Museum of American Art in New York, Frankfurter Kunstverein in Germany, the Museum of Modern Art (MoMA) in New York, Cinémathèque Française in Paris, the San Francisco Museum of Modern Art (SF MoMA), the Oakland Museum of California, the ONE National Gay and Lesbian Archives at the USC Libraries in Los Angeles, and the Cincinnati Art Museum.

== Legacy ==
Steven Arnold's vast artistic catalog continues to be exhibited worldwide, and is the subject of the 2019 documentary Steven Arnold: Heavenly Bodies. The film is narrated by Anjelica Huston, and features interviews with Ellen Burstyn, Simon Doonan, Stuart Comer, Holly Woodlawn, Theodora Van Runkle, Ed Moses, and many others.

== Filmography ==
- The Liberation of the Mannique Mechanique (1967)
- Messages, Messages (1968)
- Various Incantations of a Tibetan Seamstress (1969)
- Luminous Procuress (1971)
