= University of Southern California Libraries =

Academic research libraries in California

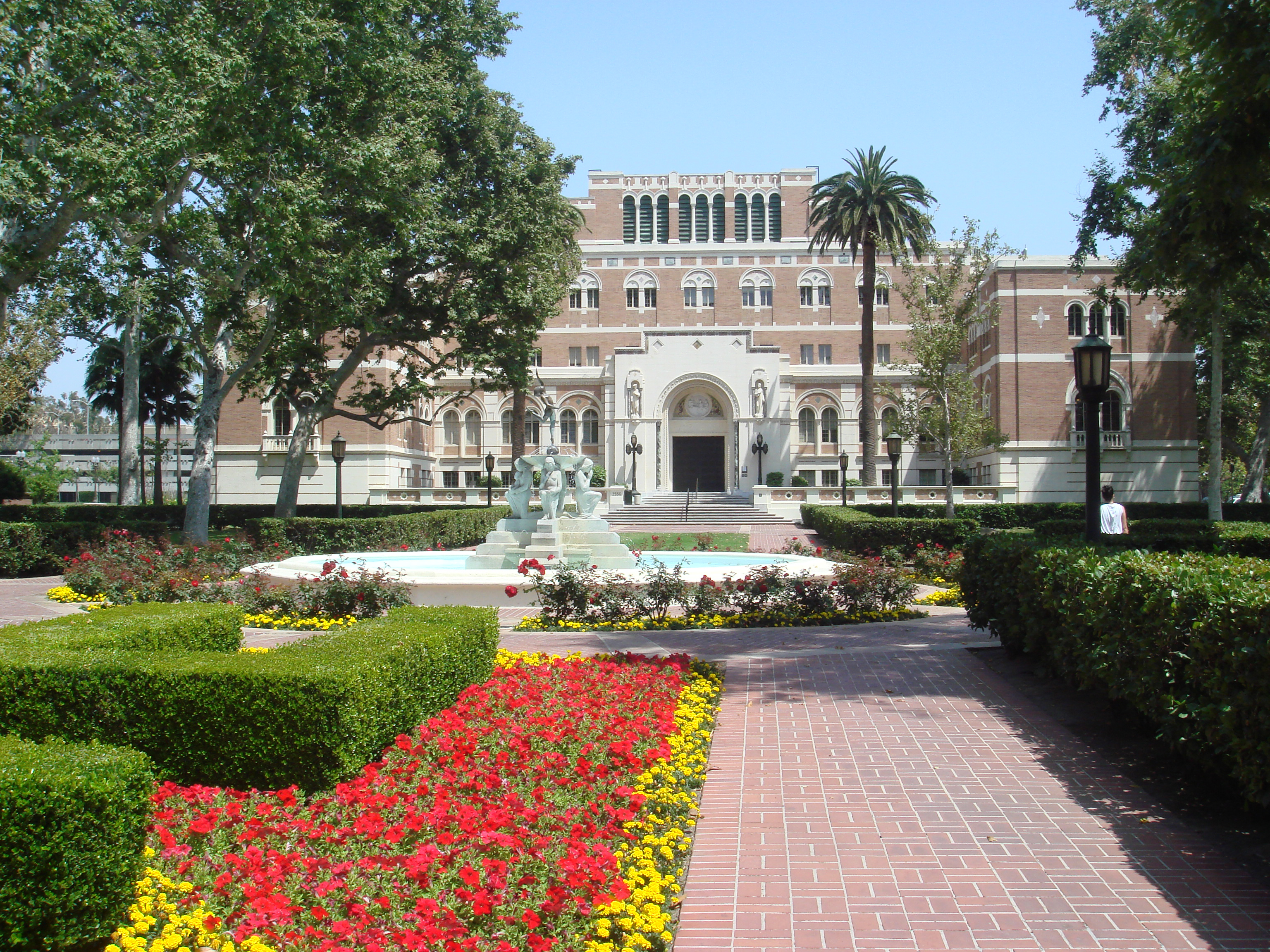
The Edward L. Doheny Jr. Memorial Library, the main library of the University of Southern California

The libraries of the University of Southern California are among the oldest private academic research libraries in California. For more than a century USC has been building collections in support of the university's teaching and research interests. Especially noteworthy collections include American literature, Cinema-Television including the Warner Bros. studio archives, European philosophy, gerontology, German exile literature, international relations, Korean studies, studies of Latin America, natural history, Southern California history, and the University Archives.

The Warner Bros. Archives is the largest single studio collection in the world. Donated in 1977 to the University of Southern California's School of Cinematic Arts, by Warner Communications, the WBA houses departmental records that detail Warner Bros. activities from the studio's first major feature, My Four Years in Germany (1918), to its sale to Seven Arts in 1968.

Announced in June 2006, the testimonies of 52,000 survivors, rescuers and others involved in the Holocaust will now be housed in the USC College of Letters, Arts & Sciences as a part of the newly formed USC Shoah Foundation Institute for Visual History and Education.

In addition to the Shoah Foundation, the USC Libraries digital collection highlights include the California Historical Society, Korean American Archives and the Chinese Historical Society of Southern California. The digital archive holds 193,252 records and 223,487 content files of varying formats.

In 2010 ONE National Gay & Lesbian Archives, the largest collection of LGBT materials in the world, became a part of USC Libraries. ONE Archives is located near the University Park Campus at 909 West Adams Boulevard.

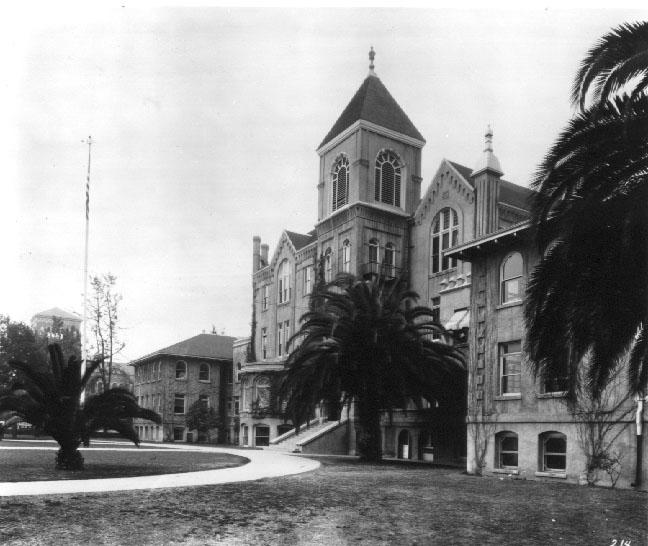
The first true library was housed in the College of Liberal Arts Building ("Old College"), which was built in 1884, and designed to hold the entire USC student body—55 students. Two wings were added to the original building in 1905. Bovard Hall can be seen to the south in the back left of the picture.

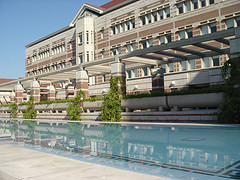
The Thomas and Dorothy Leavey Library, USC's newest library

USC's 22 libraries and other archives currently hold over 5.8 million printed volumes, 1.3 million ebooks, 3 million photographs, and subscribe to more than 30,000 current serial titles, nearly 44,000 linear feet of manuscripts and archives, and subscribe to over 120 electronic databases and more than 14,000 journals in print and electronic formats. Annually, reference transactions number close to 50,000 and approximately 1,100 instructional presentations are made to over 26,000 participants. The University of Southern California Library system is among the top 35 largest university library systems in the United States.

== USC Libraries ==
- Accounting Library
- Applied Social Sciences Library
- Helen Topping Architecture & Fine Arts Library
- Boeckmann Center for Iberian & Latin American Studies
- Roy P. Crocker Business Library
- Cinema-Television Library
- Jennifer Ann Wilson Dental Library & Learning Center
- Edward L. Doheny Jr. Memorial Library
- East Asian Library
- Education Information Center
- Gerontology Library
- Grand Avenue Library
- Asa V. Call Law Library
- Thomas and Dorothy Leavey Library
- Norris Medical Library
- Music Library
- Hoose Library of Philosophy
- ONE National Gay & Lesbian Archives
- Science & Engineering Library
- Social Work Information Center
- Specialized Libraries & Archival Collections
- University Archives
- Library for International & Public Affairs
- Digital Library
