= One World Yellow Pages =

One World Yellow Pages (One World), is a business-to-business yellow pages directory published by Global Publishers that was launched in April 2008 to provide companies and service providers an opportunity to search, connect, and transact with business partners and supplier contacts around the world.

The One World Yellow Pages directory contains comprehensive business product and supplier information, and was designed to promote and connect small and medium-sized companies, solve language barriers, improve market visibility, simplify sales sourcing, and provide businesses with global trade resources in a single online location.

One World is a wholly owned subsidiary of Global Publishers LLC, a publisher of international print and online business directories. Global Publishers also publishes the Export Yellow Pages, a directory of US companies and export service providers engaged in international trade and export promotion. The Export Yellow Pages is published as part of a public-private partnership with the United States Department of Commerce, and is administered by the Export Trading Company Affairs, International Trade Administration.

One World Yellow Pages' principal business office is located at 5055 N. Lydell Avenue, Suite 2100, Glendale, Wisconsin 53217 (USA).

== Export Related Agencies ==
- Department of Commerce (USDOC)

The mission of the USDOC is to "promote job creation and improved living standards for all Americans by creating an infrastructure that promotes economic growth, technological competitiveness, and sustainable development." Among its tasks are gathering economic and demographic data for business and government decision-making, issuing patents and trademarks, and helping to set industrial standards.

- International Trade Administration (ITA)

The International Trade Administration is an agency in the United States Department of Commerce that promotes United States exports of nonagricultural U.S. services and goods.

== See also ==
- Export
- Trade
- U.S. & Foreign Commercial Service
- International trade
- List of countries by exports
