= Luminous Procuress =

1971 film by Steven F. Arnold

Luminous Procuress is a 1971 film. It was directed by Steven F. Arnold. The film won the 1972 New Director's award at the San Francisco International Film Festival, an extended exhibition at the Whitney Museum of American Art, and a second invite of Arnold to the Cannes Director's Fortnight.
