= Donna Chaet =

Public figure in Venice, Los Angeles

- Born: Donna Chaet; 1951 or 1952; Boston, Massachusetts, U.S.
- Other names: Boston Dawna
- Occupation: Hairstylist
- Known for: Nightly street patrols of Venice, Los Angeles

Donna Chaet (born 1951 or 1952), better known as Boston Dawna, is a former resident of Venice, Los Angeles, California, who became well known for her nightly street patrols, helping the local police maintain the safety of the neighborhood. The San Diego Union-Tribune described Chaet as "like Batman, without the mask".

== Life ==
A hairstylist by day, Chaet moved to California from Boston in 1971, and in 1993, she began patrolling her Venice neighborhood for lawbreakers. According to the Los Angeles Times, she would patrol Venice in "her beat-up Oldsmobile," checking alleys, "[noting] license plates of cars that don't belong," and "[hiding] in bushes". They also noted she often caught "burglars seeking easy pickings from parked cars," whom she would keep in place "using the mere force of her brusque voice" while waiting for police to arrive. In 1995, Chaet told the paper she had been involved in "more than 100 felony arrests," and an LAPD officer told the paper she was the "most active Neighborhood Watch person" they were aware of. In addition to her patrols, Chaet also held well-attended Neighborhood Watch meetings.

In 2010, the LAPD threw a going-away party for Chaet when she left Venice to return to her native Boston.

In 2011, the operator of a website focused on real-time police scanner activity obtained a restraining order against Chaet, alleging that she harassed the site after it "took over Chaet's role in the community as a citizen watchdog".

Chaet was a notable fan of 1990s Venice band The J-Gos.
