= Yolanda Retter =

American activist

- Born: December 4, 1947; New Haven, Connecticut, United States
- Died: August 18, 2007 (aged 59); Van Nuys, Los Angeles, United States
- Occupation: Librarian
- Known for: lesbian activist

Yolanda Retter (December 4, 1947 – August 18, 2007) was an American lesbian activist, librarian, archivist, and author.

== Early life ==
Retter was born in Connecticut but spent most of her childhood in El Salvador. Her mother was Peruvian and her father was American. Her first encounter with racism took place when she was twelve years old, when she returned to school in Connecticut. This incident inspired her activism.

== Education ==
Retter attended Pitzer College in Claremont, California, and graduated in 1970 with a degree in sociology. In the 1980s she completed master's degrees in library science (1983) and social work (1987) from the University of California, Los Angeles, and in 1996 she received her Ph.D. in American Studies from the University of New Mexico, Albuquerque.

== Career ==
Before becoming a librarian and archivist, Retter held a variety of jobs, some as a volunteer. She worked in prison and parole programs, as a director of a rape hotline, and original publisher of the Los Angeles Women's Yellow Pages. She then became the founding archivist of the Lesbian Legacy Collection at the ONE Archives and volunteered at the June Mazer Lesbian Archives.

From 2003 to the time of her death, Retter served as the head librarian and archivist of the Chicano Studies Research Center at the University of California, Los Angeles.

== Death ==
Retter died on August 18, 2007, in Los Angeles, California, after a short battle with cancer. She was surrounded by her partner of thirteen years, Leslie Golden Stampler, Leslie's children, Martin and Belinda, and women she chose.

== Publications ==
- "Childcare." Encyclopedia of Feminist Theories. ed. Lorraine Code. New York: Routledge, 2002.
- Gay and Lesbian Rights in the United States: A Documentary History with Walter Lee Williams (Eds.). Westport, CT: Greenwood Press, 2003.
- Great Events in History: Gay Lesbian, Bisexual, Transgender Events. with Lillian Faderman, Horacio Roque Ramirez, et al. (Eds.). Pasadena: Salem Press, 2006
- Identity Development of Lifelong vs. Catalyzed Latina Lesbians. M.A. Thesis. University of California Los Angeles, 1987.
- "Lesbian Activism in Los Angeles (1970-1979)," Queers in Space: Communities, Public Places, Sites of Resistance. eds. Anne-Marie Bouthillette, Gordon Brent Ingram, and Yolanda Retter. Bay Press, 1997.
- "Los Angeles." Encyclopedia of Lesbian Histories and Cultures, ed. Bonnie Zimmerman. NY: Routledge, 2000. 479–480.
- On the Side of Angels: Lesbian Activism in Los Angeles, 1970-1990. Ph.D. dissertation, University of New Mexico, 1998.
- "Sisterhood is Possible." Time It Was: American Stories from the Sixties. eds. Karen Manners Smith and Tim Koster. London: Pearson, 2007.
- "Lesbians." Oxford Encyclopedia of Latinos and Latinas in the United States. New York: Oxford, 2005.
- "Martinez, Betita." Encyclopedia of Activism and Social Justice. eds. Gary L. Anderson and Kathryn G. Herr. Thousand Oaks, CA: SAGE Publications, 2007.
- "Preservation of LGBT History: The ONE Archive." Pathways to Progress: Issues and Advances in Latino Librarianship. eds. John L. Ayala and Salvador Güereña. Santa Barbara, CA: ABC-CLIO, 2012.

=== Lesbian News articles by Retter ===
- "Activist and Tenant's Rights Attorney Lisa Korben Dies at 55." Jun. 2005, Vol. 30, Issue 11, p. 15.
- "ACW Founder Brenda Weathers Dies." May 2005, Vol. 30, Issue 10, p. 17.
- "Alice Dunbar-Nelson." Dec. 1998, Vol. 24, Issue 5, p. 60.
- "Barbara Gittings (1932-2007)." Apr. 2007, Vol. 32, Issue 9, p. 5.
- "Djuna Barnes." Jan. 1999. Vol. 24, Issue 6, p. 52.
- "Dyke March: A Herstory." Jun. 1999. Vol. 24, Issue 11, p. 29.
- "Festivals: Born from Womyn's Music." [cowritten with Renee McBride] Aug. 1995, Vol. 21, Issue 1, p. 31.
- "Herstory: Catalina de Erauso." Jun. 1998, Vol. 23, Issue 11, p. 68.
- "Herstory: Deborah Sampson." Nov. 1998. Vol. 24, Issue 4, p. 52.
- "Herstory: Elaine Noble." Sep. 1998, Vol. 24, Issue 2, p. 52.
- "Herstory: Eva Le Gallienne." Jan. 1998, Vol. 23, Issue 6, p. 56.
- "Herstory: Lillian Wald." Apr. 1998, Vol. 23, Issue 9, p. 56.
- "Herstory: Mary Lewis." Feb. 1998, Vol. 23, Issue 7, p. 56.
- "Herstory: Mina Meyer and Sharon Raphael." Mar. 1998, Vol. 23, Issue 8, p. 56.
- "In Memoriam of Johnnie Phelps." May 1998, Vol. 23, Issue 10, p. 64.
- "[In Memoriam] of Alla Nazimova." Jul. 1998, Vol. 23, Issue 12, p. 52.
- "The Ladies of Llargollen." Mar. 1999, Vol. 24, Issue 8, p. 64.
- "Lesbian Los Angeles." March 1995, Vol. 20 Issue 8, p. 62-63.
- "The LNs Herstory is the Chronicle of Our Story." Aug. 1999, Vol. 25, Issue 1, p. 29.
- "Ruth Ellis." Feb. 1999, Vol. 24, Issue 7, p. 56.
- "Sarah Josephine Baker." Apr. 1999, Vol. 24, Issue 9, p. 52.
