= Los Angeles Reader =

Defunct weekly newspaper

- Type: Alternative weekly
- Format: Tabloid
- Owner: Burnside Group
- Editor: James Vowell
- Founded: 1978; 48 years ago
- Ceased publication: August 16, 1996; 29 years ago
- Headquarters: 5550 Wilshire Blvd. Los Angeles, CA 90036; United States
- Circulation: 60,000
- ISSN: 1046-2392

Los Angeles Reader was a weekly paper established in 1978 and distributed in Los Angeles, United States. It followed the format of the (still-active) Chicago Reader. The paper was known for having lengthy, thoughtful reviews of movies, plays and concerts in the L.A. area.

James Vowell was its founding editor. Among its writers were Keith Fitzgerald, Nigey Lennon, Lionel Rolfe, Lawrence Wechsler, Mick Farren, Richard Meltzer, Heidi Dvorak, Chris Morris, Jerry Stahl, Steven Kane, Andy Klein, Allen Levy, Jim Goad, Kirk Silsbee, Henry Sheehan, Samantha Dunn, Natalie Nichols, Steve Appleford, Eric Mankin (also editor), Rich Robinson, Paul Birchall, Eddie Rivera (who wrote the paper's first cover story), Amy Steinberg, Dan Sallitt, Myron Meisel, David Ehrenstein, Tom Davis, Dave McCombs, Mark Leviton, Bruce Bebb, Stuart Goldman, Ernest Hardy, Kevin Uhrich, Erik Himmelsbach, David L. Ulin, Lance Loud, J. Michael Straczynski, and Laurence Vittes (Classical Music Critic, 1991–1998).

It is known for being the first newspaper to publish Matt Groening's cartoon strip Life in Hell, on April 25, 1980. James Vowell hired Groening as his assistant editor in 1979. Groening was also originally a Reader music critic. It also ran a cartoon strip by David Lynch (director of Blue Velvet) called The Angriest Dog in the World, a strip notable for having exactly the same drawing panels for its entire run. James Vowell and his wife Codette Wallace bought the Reader from the Chicago Reader in February 1989. They sold the Reader to New Times Media in 1996, which merged it with the Los Angeles View to form New Times LA.
