= Los Angeles View =

Weekly newspaper in Los Angeles

The Los Angeles View, also known as the Village View and Los Angeles Village View, was a weekly alternative newspaper in Los Angeles that was published from 1986 to 1996. Based in West Los Angeles, The Los Angeles Times called the View an "eccentric tabloid that specialized in politics and culture." Danny Feingold, the managing editor of the View, described the paper as having "a real spirit of independence and eclecticism and radicalism."

== Background ==
The View merged with the Los Angeles Reader to form New Times LA in 1996. The View had a print circulation of 75,000 at the time of the merger. The Los Angeles Times described New Times' purchase of the View as its "newest weapon" in Los Angeles' alternative weekly "newspaper war," observing that the purchase showed that New Times had "upped the ante in its battle for newspaper readers."
