= June L. Mazer Lesbian Archives =

- 34°04′54.4″N 118°23′07.1″W
- Location: 626 N. Robertson Blvd. West Hollywood, CA 90069, United States
- Type: Archive
- Established: 1981

Collection
- Items collected: Private papers, personal artifacts, organizational records, photographs, artwork, manuscripts, books, newspapers, magazines, newsletters, music recordings, videotapes, posters, flyers, buttons, clothing.
- Criteria for collection: Materials about lesbian and feminist history and culture.

Access and use
- Access requirements: Visits – free. Special events require registration.

Other information
- Director: Board of Directors
- Affiliation: UCLA Center for the Study of Women
- Website: mazerlesbianarchives.org

The June L. Mazer Lesbian Archives is a grassroots archive dedicated to collecting, protecting, and conserving lesbian and feminist history. The Archives was founded in 1981 as the West Coast Lesbian Collections (WCLC) by Lynn Fonfa and Cherrie Cox in Oakland, California.

== History ==
In 1987, the West Coast Lesbian Collections officially relocated to Southern California with the help of Connexxus Women's Center, Jean Conger, and the Gay and Lesbian Task Force of the City of West Hollywood and was renamed the June L. Mazer Lesbian Collections (JMLC).

Nancy "Bunny" MacCulloch, who was on the board of directors of Connexxus, and her partner June L. Mazer became custodians of the WCLC within their home in Altadena, California. After Mazer's death from cancer in January 1987, the collections was renamed after Mazer and MacCulloch continued to maintain it with the assistance of volunteers. On November 28, 1988, the City of West Hollywood granted a permanent location for the June L. Mazer Lesbian Collections in the Werle Building, a city-owned property. The JMLC was moved from MacCulloch's home and in 1989 received 501(c)(3) organization status.

In 1989, the Mazer Archives created an outreach and collection-building partnership with the UCLA Center for the Study of Women and the UCLA Library Special Collections of the Charles E. Young Research Library. In 2011, the Mazer Archives and the UCLA Center for Women hosted the 3rd LGBT ALMS Conference. In 2015, Wolfe Video donated 100 lesbian movies to the Archives.

The June L. Mazer Lesbian Archives describes itself as "the only archive on this side of the continent that is dedicated exclusively to preserving lesbian history." It is supported by funding from private donors and the City of West Hollywood, and has been run strictly by volunteers since 1985.

== See also ==
- GLBT Historical Society
- Lesbian Herstory Archives
- ONE National Gay & Lesbian Archives
