= Helen Sandoz =

American lesbian rights activist and writer

Helen Jane "Sandy" Sandoz (November 2, 1920 – June 7, 1987), also known by her pseudonym Helen Sanders, was an American lesbian rights activist and writer. She was involved in the Daughters of Bilitis and its official publication, The Ladder, from 1956 to 1970.

== Biography ==
Sandoz was born on November 2, 1920, in Corvallis, Oregon. Her mother, who worked as a maid, had immigrated to the United States from Sweden and was a descendant of Edouard Sandoz, the co-founder of the Sandoz pharmaceutical company. She met her father, a railroad worker, for the first time when she was eighteen years old. After completing a bachelor's degree in psychology at Reed College, she worked at department stores in Oregon and Washington state. Following a car accident that left her with a broken neck, she was unable to sit down for long periods of time, so she became a sign painter.

Sandoz later moved from Oregon to San Francisco, where she joined the Daughters of Bilitis (DOB), a lesbian rights organization, in 1956. She was hired as an assistant to the editor of the DOB's official magazine, The Ladder. Although she used the pseudonym "Helen Sanders" for most of her public work with the DOB, when the organization filed a legal charter in 1957, Sandoz was one of few women who signed the charter with her real name. She served briefly as president of the DOB in 1957, before moving to Los Angeles, where she became the first president of the local DOB chapter. She was involved in the publication of The Ladder in a variety of roles, as a production manager, director of publications, and a frequent cover designer. In 1966, she was appointed editor of the magazine, a position that she passed on to Barbara Grier in 1968. As editor, she amended the DOB's Statement of Purpose to use the word "lesbian" instead of the vague "variant". Under her leadership, The Ladder became less political and more lighthearted; Sandoz occasionally wrote editorials from the perspective of her cat, credited as "Ben the Cat". When the DOB folded in 1970, Sandoz chose not to follow most of its members to the newly formed National Organization for Women, since she did not agree with its rhetoric and wanted to campaign for the rights of gay men as well as lesbians.

Sandoz and Stella Rush were also associated with the Circle of Loving Companions, a politically active collective for gay people. They were close friends with the circle's founders, Harry Hay and John Burnside.

== Personal life ==
Sandoz met her long-term partner, Stella Rush, through the DOB in 1957. From 1958, they lived together in Silver Lake, Los Angeles, until Sandoz's death from lung cancer on June 7, 1987.
