= Doheny Library =

Library at the University of Southern California

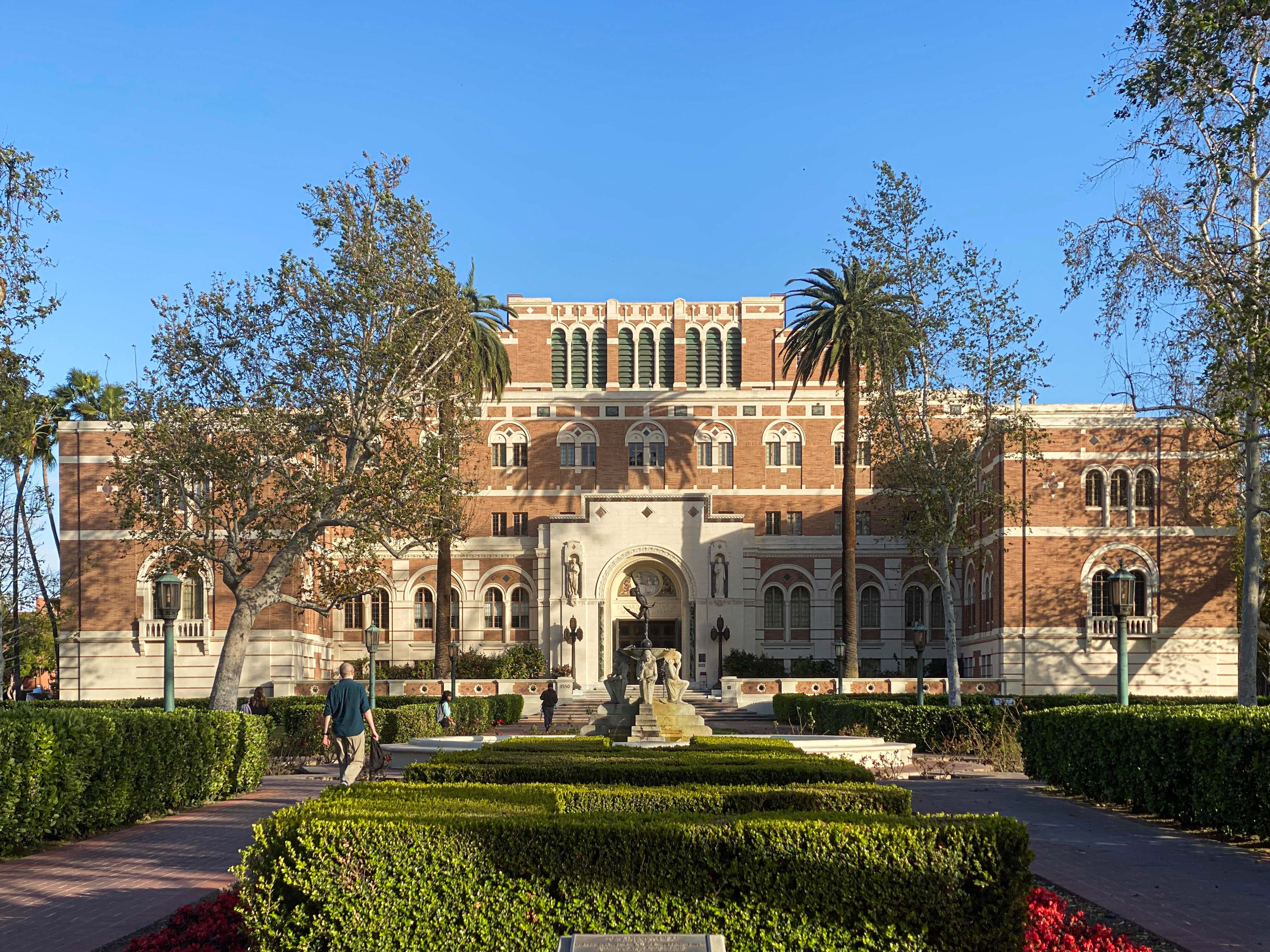
- Doheny Library
- 34.0201°N 118.2838°W
- Location: University Park, Los Angeles, California, United States
- Type: Academic library
- Scope: University
- Established: 1932
- Branch of: University of Southern California Libraries

Other information
- Director: Sophie Lesinska
- Website: https://libraries.usc.edu/locations/doheny-memorial-library

The Edward L. Doheny Jr. Memorial Library is a library located in the center of the University of Southern California (USC) campus.

== History ==
After the shooting of his son, the Irish American oil tycoon Edward L. Doheny donated $1.1 million in 1932 to USC to build the Doheny Library. While the exterior of the library was designed by architect Ralph Adams Cram, the interiors and the final working drawings for the building were designed by Pasadena-based architect, Samuel Lunden. With its use of rounded arches, pale brick and limestone, the library was designed to be suggestive of Romanesque style architecture in Northern Italy and additionally, given its association with USC and higher education, is adorned with statues of Shakespeare and Dante in its main entrance and the marble etching above the front doors depicts a sitting scene of a teacher instructing two students. When the library was initially constructed it was built to hold between 450,000 and 500,000 volumes, but a wing expansion in the 1960 doubled that number, meeting the projects of then head librarian at USC, Charlotte Brown. The gardens were designed by A.E. Hanson (1893-1986).

== Ground Floor ==
Composed of the rotunda, the Cinema-Television Library and the David L. Wolper Center, this section of the library is the main research and study area for the college's Thornton School of Music. In addition to the 20,000 books and archives of several movie and television production companies there are upwards of 55,000 music scores and 25,000 sound recordings that are accessible through the Doheny Library's own Music Library.

== First Floor ==
The first floor of the library includes the circulation desk and entrance to the nine levels of stacks (holding the majority of the library's book collection), the Treasure Room (an exhibition space), the former Current Periodical Reading Room, the Los Angeles Times Reference Room, the Dean's Suite, the Hall of Honor (formerly the card catalog room) and also the East Asian Library (offering a collection of references and periodicals in Chinese, Japanese and Korean).

== Second Floor ==
The second floor is home to USC Special Collections, a non-circulating collection of rare books and archives that is open to the public. The floor is also used for offices, event space, and studying.

== Film Use ==
The Doheny Library was used as a filming location for Mike Nichols' 1967 film The Graduate, for the sequence in which Benjamin Braddock (Dustin Hoffman) waits by the fountain for Elaine Robinson (Katharine Ross), who exits the library's main door. The library's exterior entrance, rotunda and one of its halls was also used to film the library scenes in Danny DeVito's 1996 film Matilda, though the library is left nameless in the film itself. The rotunda was modified to include a large rounded reference desk and two large stacks were added to the hall used in the film.
