= One Institute =

American gay rights organization

Logo of One Institute

Founded in 1952, One Institute (formerly One, Inc., and One Archives Foundation) is the oldest active LGBTQ+ organization in the United States, dedicated to telling LGBTQ+ history and stories through education, arts, and social justice programs. Since its inception, the organization has been headquartered in Los Angeles, California.

== Founding ==
In October 1952, two years after forming Harry Hays' historic gay rights organization, The Mattachine Society, the concept of a magazine focused on homosexual issues was first brought up during a meeting at Hays' residence.

In November 1952, ONE Inc. was founded. ONE Inc.'s Articles of Incorporation were signed by Antonio "Tony" Reyes, Martin Block, and Dale Jennings on November 15, 1952. Other founders were Merton Bird, W. Dorr Legg, Don Slater, Chuck Rowland, and Harry Hay, “all of whom sought to unify homosexuals into social action.” Jennings and Rowland were also founders of the Mattachine Society. The name was derived from an aphorism by Victorian writer Thomas Carlyle: "A mystic bond of brotherhood makes all men one." The name was also a nod to referring to a gay person as "one of us".

In January 1953, the first issue of ONE Magazine was published, making it the first LGBTQ magazine available in the United States. The publication was also the first gay organization with a public office space in Downtown Los Angeles, where copies were sold on street corners for 25 cents.

== History ==
In August 1953, Los Angeles port authorities confiscated a shipment of the August edition, which had the title "Homosexual Marriage?" on the cover. After protests from Mattachine Society members, the magazines were released by the port authorities three weeks later.

One, Inc. readily admitted women, including—with their pseudonyms—Joan Corbin (as Eve Elloree), Irma Wolf (as Ann Carrl Reid), Stella Rush (as Sten Russell), Helen Sandoz (as Helen Sanders), and Betty Perdue (as Geraldine Jackson). They were vital to its early success. ONE and Mattachine, in turn, provided vital help to the Daughters of Bilitis in the launching of their newsletter, The Ladder, in 1956. The Daughters of Bilitis was the counterpart lesbian organization to the Mattachine Society, and the organizations worked together on some campaigns and ran lecture series. Bilitis came under attack in the early 1960s for "siding" with Mattachine and ONE, rather than with the new separatist feminists.

In 1955, One held the ONE Midwinter Institute, the first in a series of conferences to bring together experts and community members to talk about gay and lesbian topics.

In 1956, the ONE Institute for Homophile Studies was established as an academic branch of ONE Inc. In addition to organizing classes and annual conferences, the Institute also published the ONE Institute Quarterly, a journal dedicated to the academic exploration of homosexuality.

In 1957, marking the first time the Supreme Court of the United States explicitly ruled on homosexuality, ONE Inc. fought to distribute its magazine by mail and prevailed. The ruling in the case One, Inc. v. Olesen not only allowed One to distribute its magazine but also paved the way for other controversial publications to be sent through the U.S. mail.

Also, during the 1950s, ONE Inc. became an ad hoc community center and began a library. As the burgeoning gay liberation movement took off and became more closely intertwined with the movements for civil rights of the 1960s and 1970s, ONE Inc., Jim Kepner and a growing group of activists were poised to collect original materials from that critical time period. By the late 1970s and early 1980s, ONE obtained crucial documents chronicling the establishment of the "gay community" and its established and increasingly diverse groups and organizations.

In 1965, One separated over irreconcilable differences between ONE's business manager Dorr Legg and One magazine editor Don Slater. After a two-year court battle, Dorr Legg's faction retained the name "ONE, Inc." and Don Slater's faction retained most of the corporate library and archives. In 1968, Slater's group became the Homosexual Information Center or HIC, a non-profit corporation that continues to function. After Slater's death in 1997, the board of HIC voted to cede all of the archival materials back to ONE, Inc.

In 1996, One, Inc. merged with ISHR, the Institute for the Study of Human Resources, a non-profit organization created by transgender philanthropist Reed Erickson, with ISHR being the surviving organization and ONE being the merging corporation. In 2005, the HIC donated many of its historic materials, including most of ONE Incorporated's Blanche M. Baker Memorial Library, to the Vern and Bonnie Bullough Collection on Sex and Gender, a special collection within the University Library at California State University, Northridge. In October 2010, ONE transferred its archives to the ONE National Gay & Lesbian Archives at the University of Southern California for preservation. ONE, Inc. continues to exist to organize exhibits and gather new material.

In 2014, the organization is renamed ONE Archives Foundation.

In 2022, ONE Archives Foundation celebrates the 70th anniversary of its founding, and in 2023 celebrated the 70th anniversary of the printing of ONE Magazine.

In September 2023, the organization is renamed One Institute. The name is announced ahead of its inaugural Circa: Queer Histories Festival.

== Current programs ==
=== LGBTQ+ History Lesson Plans ===
One Institute is among a select number of California nonprofits that provide K-12 teacher training and lesson plans to implement California’s the FAIR ACT and integrate queer history into classrooms in California public schools. One Institute’s state, local, and nonprofit partners include the California Department of Education, LA County Office of Education, LA Unified School District, UCLA History-Geography Project, OUT for Safe Schools at the LA LGBT Center, and more.

=== Arts & Cultural Programs ===
Each year, One Institute organizes dozens of free and low cost, high quality exhibitions, multimedia projects, and public programs that explore the complexity of LGBTQ+ history through the lens of arts, culture, and contemporary issues. Exhibitions illuminate archival elements from ONE Archives at the USC Libraries alongside artist projects and works.

=== Circa: Queer Histories Festival ===
In October 2023 during LGBT History Month, One Institute launched Circa: Queer Histories Festival, a month-long LGBTQ+ history festival with events throughout the Los Angeles region. Circa’s annual lineup includes exhibitions, readings, performances, panel conversations, and more, showcasing the trailblazing history and cultural contributions of the LGBTQ+ community.

=== Youspeak Radio ===
An intergenerational podcast project, connecting high school students with LGBTQ+ adult trailblazers. Past guests include Phill Wilson, Helen Zia, Bamby Salcedo, and more.

=== Youth Ambassadors for Queer History ===
One Institute mentors a core group of high school student leaders from across Los Angeles County to become ambassadors for LGBTQ+ history in their communities. Programming includes LGBTQ+ history presentations; interactive workshops with scholars, activists, and artists; hands-on archival research in ONE Archives at the USC Libraries; and field trips to LGBTQ+ organizations in Los Angeles.

== Select past programs ==
Cover of One magazine, April–May 1956

=== ONE Magazine (1953-1967) ===
In January 1953 One, Inc. began publishing a monthly magazine called One, the first U.S. pro-gay publication, which it sold openly on the streets of Downtown Los Angeles for 25 cents. In October 1954, the U.S. Post Office Department declared the magazine "obscene" and refused to deliver it. ONE, Inc. brought a lawsuit in federal court, which it lost in 1957. However, when the U.S. Supreme Court reversed the lower court ruling that ONE violated obscenity laws in One, Inc. v. Olesen based on its recent landmark First Amendment case, Roth v. United States. The Supreme Court thereby upheld constitutional protection for pro-homosexual writing.

The magazine ceased publication in December 1967.

=== ONE Institute of Homophile Studies (1956) ===
In 1956, ONE established the ONE Institute of Homophile Studies which, in addition to organizing classes and annual conferences, also published the ONE Institute Quarterly, a journal dedicated to the academic exploration of homosexuality.

=== The Normal Heart (2021) ===
In May 2021, the organization presented a historic virtual reading of Larry Kramer's The Normal Heart reaching audiences across the United States and in 19 countries across the globe. The virtual presentation marked the first time the play featured a cast that is predominately BIPOC and LGBTQ. Directed by Emmy Award winner Paris Barclay, cast members of the production included Sterling K. Brown, Laverne Cox, Jeremy Pope, Vincent Rodriguez III, Guillermo Díaz, Jake Borelli, Ryan O’Connell, Daniel Newman, Jay Hayden and Danielle Savre. An encore presentation of the reading streamed worldwide in December 2021 in honor of World AIDS Day.

=== Pride Publics: Works in Action (2021) ===
A public art project that took place in three different locations across Los Angeles, featuring portraits of contemporary LGBTQ+ artists, writers, and community organizers

=== Days of Rage (2022) ===
An online multimedia exhibit featuring historical LGBTQ+ activist posters from the collections at ONE Archives at the USC Libraries.

== One Gallery, West Hollywood ==
Since 2008, One Institute has operated One Gallery, an exhibition space in West Hollywood, California dedicated to presenting temporary exhibitions on LGBT art and history. The gallery is located in a city owned building that also houses the June L. Mazer Lesbian Archives.

In 2011, One participated in the region-wide Pacific Standard Time: Art in L.A., 1945-1980 initiative with the exhibition Cruising the Archive: Queer Art & Culture in Los Angeles, 1945-1980 which was presented at the ONE Gallery in West Hollywood, as well as at ONE Archives' main location on West Adams Boulevard and in the Treasure Room at the Doheny Library at the University of Southern California Libraries. The exhibition included works by Steven F. Arnold, Don Bachardy, Claire Falkenstein, Anthony Friedkin, Rudi Gernreich, Sister Corita Kent, and Kate Millett, among many other less known or anonymous artists. The only exhibition dedicated to queer content within the PST initiative, this exhibition marked the most comprehensive exhibition of materials from the collections at ONE Archives to date and was accompanied by a scholarly catalogue. The publication included contributions by Ann Cvetkovich, Vaginal Davis, Jennifer Doyle, Jack Halberstam, Catherine Lord, Richard Meyer, Ulrike Müller, and Dean Spade.

The One Gallery has presented solo exhibitions of artwork by Steven F. Arnold and Joey Terrill, exhibitions of historical materials from the collections at ONE, and highlights from the collections of the Tom of Finland Foundation and the Center for the Study of Political Graphics.

== Organizational timeline ==
The institutional history of One Institute reveals a set of complex and overlapping activities that provided a wide variety of pioneering services to LGBTQ+ Americans:

- October 1952: The idea of a magazine for homosexuals is first discussed in a Mattachine Society meeting.
- November 1952: the organization is founded as ONE, Inc..
- January 1953: The first issue of ONE Magazine is published.
- August/September 1953: The Los Angeles postal authorities seize the August edition of ONE Magazine. The issue, which bore the title "Homosexual Marriage?" on the cover, is released three weeks later without explanation.
- November 1953: One opens an office in downtown Los Angeles at 232 South Hill Street.
- October 1954: The Los Angeles postal authorities seize the October issues of ONE Magazine on charges of obscenity.
- 1956: The One Institute for Homophile Studies opens.
- January 13, 1958: After four years of litigation, the Supreme Court declares ONE Magazine is not in violation of obscenity laws.
- 1962: The organization moves to 2256 Venice Boulevard.
- 1967: ONE Magazine ceases publication.
- 1975: Jim Kepner's personal archive is named the Western Gay Archives.
- 1979: The Western Gay Archives is renamed the National Gay Archives: Natalie Barney/Edward Carpenter Library and moves to 1654 North Hudson Avenue in Hollywood.
- August 1981: One Institute becomes the first institution of higher learning in the United States to offer masters and doctoral degrees in Homophile Studies.
- 1983: The organization moves into the Milbank Estate at 3340 Country Club Drive purchased by philanthropist Reed Erickson. Soon after, for reasons uncertain, Erickson seeks to have One removed from the estate.
- 1984: The National Gay Archives is renamed the International Gay & Lesbian Archives (IGLA).
- 1988: IGLA moves to a space owned by the City of West Hollywood at 626 North Robertson Boulevard (the current location of the ONE Archives Gallery & Museum).
- 1994: W. Dorr Legg dies. The organization merges with the IGLA and becomes primarily an LGBTQ archive; the organization refers to itself as ONE Institute and ONE Institute/IGLA.
- 1997: Jim Kepner dies.
- 2000: ONE Institute/IGLA moves to its current location at 909 West Adams Boulevard provided by the University of Southern California.
- 2004: The organization is renamed One National Gay & Lesbian Archives.
- October 2010: The collections at One Archives become a part of the USC Libraries.
- 2014: The organization is renamed ONE Archives Foundation.
- 2016: Jennifer Gregg named as the first executive director of the ONE Archives Foundation
- May 2021: The organization presented a historic virtual reading of "The Normal Heart" reaching audiences across the United States and in 19 countries across the globe. The virtual presentation marked the first time the play featured a cast that is predominantly BIPOC and LGBTQ+.
- Tony Valenzuela becomes the executive director of the organization.
- September 2023: In honor of the 70th anniversary of ONE Magazine, the organization launches a major rebrand and is renamed One Institute.
- October 2023: One Institute launched the annual Circa: Queer Histories Festival, a month long LGBTQ+ history festival with events throughout the Los Angeles region.

== See also ==
- ONE National Gay & Lesbian Archives
- LGBT rights in the United States
- List of LGBT rights organizations
- Timeline of LGBT history
