= W. Dorr Legg =

American architect (1904–1994)

William Dorr Lambert Legg (December 15, 1904 — July 26, 1994), known as W. Dorr Legg, was an American landscape architect and one of the founders of the United States gay rights movement, then called the homophile movement.

== Early years ==
Born in Ann Arbor, Michigan, the second child of Franc C. Dorr and Frank E. Legg, his older brother was Victor Eldred Legg and younger brother was Frank Evariste Legg Jr.

He trained as a landscape architect at the University of Michigan at Ann Arbor and from 1935 was professor of landscape architecture at Oregon State Agricultural College (now Oregon State University). He moved back to Michigan in the 1940s to care for his father and the family business.

In 1949 he moved to Los Angeles with his partner Merton Bird. In 1950 the couple founded Knights of the Clock, a support group for interracial gay couples. The couple actively joined the national Mattachine Society, but quickly joined those Mattachine members who separated from the Mattachine Society to publish the first homophile magazine, ONE, Inc.

As publisher of the ONE's monthly magazine, Legg sued the United States Postal Service to defend the right of its publications to be distributed through the US Mail. The case, One, Inc. v. Olesen (355 U.S. 371; 78 S. Ct. 364; 2 L. Ed. 2d 352; 1958) was pursued through appeals to a successful conclusion in 1958 before the United States Supreme Court. Legg traveled to Germany in the 1950s to recover the remains of the archives of the Institut für Sexualwissenschaft.

== Writing ==
Legg wrote and edited Homophile Studies in Theory and Practice, published in 1994, co-published by One Institute Press, Los Angeles and GLB Publishers, San Francisco. In 1976 he helped compile An Annotated Bibliography of Homosexuality, which listed 13,000 works on the subject from around the world. "It was widely recognized as the first massive compilation of information about homosexuality," said Richard Docter, a retired psychology professor at California State University, Northridge. The landmark compendium helped encourage serious scholarship on gay and lesbian issues, Docter said. An Annotated Bibliography of Homosexuality (in two volumes), edited by Vern Bullough, W. Dorr Legg, Barrett W. Elcano, and James Kepner, Garland Publishing Inc (New York & London), 1976.

== Death ==
Legg died in Los Angeles on July 26, 1994, of pancreatic cancer.

In 2011 the National Lesbian and Gay Journalists Association announced that Legg would be inducted into its hall of fame.

== In popular culture ==
Season 4, episode 5 of the podcast “Making Gay History” is about Legg, Jim Kepner, and Martin Block.

== See also ==
- LGBT culture in Metro Detroit

== Bibliography ==
- Cutler, Marvin (pseud of W. Dorr Legg). Homosexuals Today: 1956 Handbook of Organizations and Publications. ONE, Inc., Los Angeles, CA 1956.
- Legg, W. Dorr, David G. Cameron, Walter L. Williams and Donald C. Paul. Homophile Studies in Theory and Practice, ONE Institute Press, Los Angeles, CA and GLB Publishers, San Francisco, CA, 1994.
- Bullough, Vern L., W. Dorr Legg, Barrett W. Elcano, James Kepner. "An annotated bibliography of homosexuality." The Institute for the Study of Human Resources, Los Angeles & Garland Publishing, Inc., New York & London, 1976.
- Bullough, Vern L. Before Stonewall: Activists for Gay and Lesbian Rights in Historical Context. Harrington Park Press, 2002.
