= Export Yellow Pages =

The Export Yellow Pages (EYP) was a multi-media trade and promotion resource for exporters that provides U.S. companies, exporters and export related service providers across all industries a convenient way to engage in export promotion and establish contacts and conduct business and trade around the globe with international buyers. Through the EYP, the Department of Commerce offers all U.S. companies and service providers a free online and print business directory listing and access to the directory and multi-media export.

The Export Yellow Pages is no longer published.

== History ==
The Export Yellow Pages was created in 1993 under the Bush administration as a public–private partnership in partnership with Delphos International. Under its leadership of Bill Delphos and Donald Burley the publication was distributed worldwide to 210 countries with the US Department of Commerce and other government agencies distributing the directory to foreign buyers looking to purchase American made goods and services.

The Export Yellow Pages print and online directory detailed products and services of over 27,000 U.S. companies representing over 65,000 business categories, as well as offers access to U.S. company executives, product catalogs, news and other export related information and resources. The website is no longer fully functional.

Connections and links to the Department of Commerce and other U.S. government international trade offices and agencies and resources are also presented at the Export Yellow Pages to further assist U.S. companies and foreign buyers in navigating international trade opportunities and processes. This website and searches on it may not reliably work anymore.

== Export-related agencies ==
- Department of Commerce (USDOC)

The mission of the USDOC is to "promote job creation and improved living standards for all Americans by creating an infrastructure that promotes economic growth, technological competitiveness, and sustainable development." Among its tasks are gathering economic and demographic data for business and government decision-making, issuing patents and trademarks, and helping to set industrial standards.

- International Trade Administration (ITA)

The International Trade Administration is an agency in the United States Department of Commerce that promotes United States exports of nonagricultural U.S. services and goods.

- Foreign Agricultural Service (FAS)

The Foreign Agricultural Service has primary responsibility for the United States Department of Agriculture (USDA) overseas programs—market development, international trade agreements and negotiations, and the collection of statistics and market information. The FAS assists U.S. exporters of agricultural products. It also administers USDA's export credit guarantee and food aid programs and helps increase income and food availability in developing nations by mobilizing expertise for agriculturally led economic growth.

- Export-Import Bank of the United States (Ex-Im Bank)

Ex-Im Bank is the official export credit agency of the United States federal government. It is an independent agency in the Executive branch established by Congress in 1934 for the purposes of financing and insuring foreign purchases of United States goods for customers unable or unwilling to accept credit risk. The mission of the Bank is to create and sustain U.S. jobs by financing sales of U.S. exports to international buyers. Ex-Im Bank does not compete with private sector lenders, but rather provides financing for transactions that would otherwise not take place because commercial lenders are either unable or unwilling to accept the political or commercial risks inherent in the deal.

== See also ==
- International trade
- List of countries by exports
- U.S. & Foreign Commercial Service
