= Beert C. Verstraete =

Dutch professor

Beert C. Verstraete is Dutch professor emeritus from Acadia University. He is the co-editor of Censoring Sex Research, Same-Sex Desire and Love in Greco-Roman Antiquity and in the Classical Tradition of the West, and co-author of The Age of Marriage in Ancient Rome.
