= Pets and the LGBTQ community =

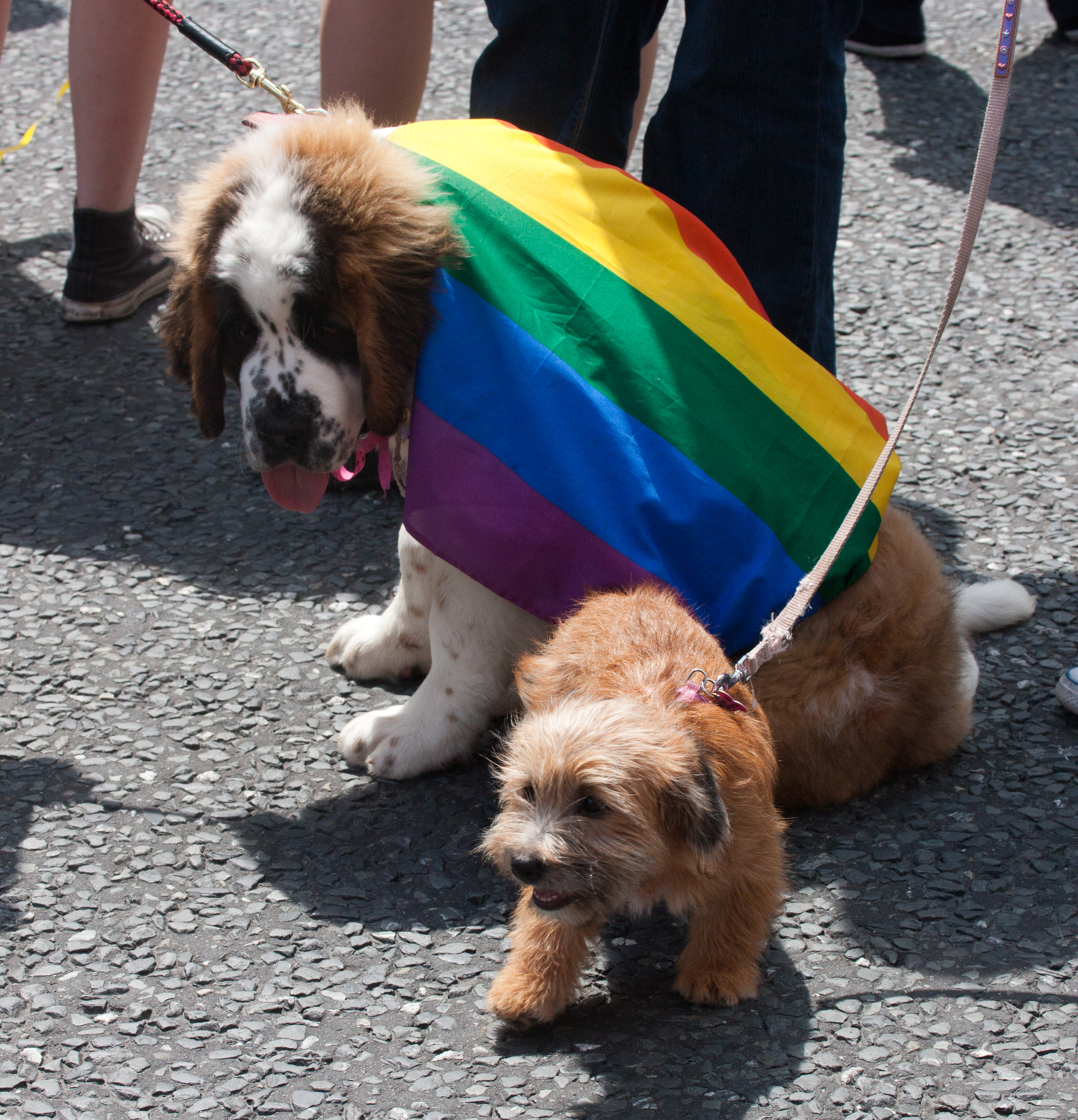
A dog at Dublin Pride 2010, wearing the LGBT rainbow flag

Pet ownership carries significance within the LGBTQ community. In recent years, there has been more academic attention placed on "the intersections of human and animal lives in the context of LGBT communities".

== Background ==
In the United States, LGBTQ adults were more likely to own pets than heterosexual adults as a Harris Interactive poll, surveying 2,455 U.S. adults, reported in December 2007, and child-free LGBTQ households are more likely to own pets than child-free heterosexual households. In 2021, Alison Nastasi and P.J. Nastasi published a book, entitled Queer Icons and Their Cats, which noted queer icons who owned cats, such as musicians Dusty Springfield, Elton John, and Freddie Mercury, authors Alison Bechdel and James Baldwin, singer Josephine Baker, actress Holly Woodlawn, pornstar Buck Angel, songwriter Janis Joplin, fashion designer Jason Wu, comedian Tig Notaro, and actor Justin Simien.

Julie Miller of Vanity Fair also reported that Mercury wrote a song about one cat, dedicated one album to "a few others," and even placed "long-distance calls to his animals" while he was on tour, saying this was noted in the 2018 film Bohemian Rhapsody by showing Mercury as "allotting each cat a separate bedroom in his London mansion." Arsalan Mohammad of Sotheby's said Mercury's love of his cats was "legendary," stating that throughout the adult life of Mercury, he "absolutely doted on his cats," who roamed across his house Garden Lodge, with Mohammad listing seven of his cats which lived at the house from the 1970s to the 1990s and noting their personalities. Cats were also present in Bechdel's comic, Dykes to Watch Out For. Some noted that Baker would walk her pet cheetah, Chiquita, through the Paris streets, with both "draped in pearls" and that she would sometimes perform on stage with Baker at nightclubs in the city, wearing a diamond collar, and jumping off stage, and, at times, "into the orchestra pit."

It was reported that when Joplin and Richard Hundgen, the Grateful Dead's San Francisco-based road manager, were offstage during a San Diego gig, in July 11, 1970, for both Full Tilt Boogie and Big Brother and the Holding Company, she drunkenly said the following, which he later repeated to biographer Myra Friedman, "I hear a rumor that somebody in San Francisco is spreading stories that I'm a dyke. You go back there and find out who it is and tell them that Janis says she's gotten it on with a couple of thousand cats in her life and a few hundred chicks and see what they can do with that!" In the same biography, Friedman noted that Joplin preferred a quiet environment with redwood trees, antique decor, and the "comfort of her animals" which included two cats and three dogs. Otherwise, People noted that in 2021, Wu created a line of fashion products for the "Cat Person" brand inspired by his two cats, Jinxy and Peaches, with "a sleek litter box, a stylish cat food bowl, a metal scoop, a catnip toy and a black hoodie."

Publications such as Cosmopolitan and Kinship noted that for some queer people, they see their pets as part of their chosen family, either because they have a deep or "particularly special" connection with them, with some thinking that the "choice of pet can be a signifier of queerness" itself, seeing the pets as "queer comrades", or seeing themselves as "pet parents."

== Cats and lesbian feminism ==
Cats have been used as a "lazy visual shorthand" within popular culture to "[signify] clichés about effeminate gay men and lonely lesbian women". The urban myth that lesbians are likely to have cats at home took hold within early lesbian feminism; cats were said to exhibit "spirited feline self-sufficiency" which made them "an essential accoutrement to all lesbian's lives, providing a mirror to their owners' challenge to the hetero-patriarchal social order". On the other hand, some took the view that pet ownership was oppressive, and took objection to a form of lesbian feminism that "[fought] against the oppression of women, whilst remaining silent on the oppression of animals."

In July 2019, "The Wide World of Lesbian Cats" exhibition premiered at the Lesbian, Gay, Bisexual & Transgender Community Center in New York City, which described the "prevalence of cat imagery through early dyke print culture, lesbian comics...and current-day meme accounts" and noting how lesbians have "played with pejorative cultural associations linking cats and dykes." Rachel Corbman, scholar who worked for the Lesbian Herstory Archives, and organizer of exhibition, told Dazed that the exhibition focuses on "how lesbians have defined themselves through their own media" and that cats have associations which are "ingrained by the 70s and 80s" and connected with "deviant forms of femininity like witches, spinsters, and lesbians," with the latter reclaiming that from the "pejorative assumptions."

Corbman wrote a related posting for the New York Historical Society. She noted that the two founders of Lesbian Herstory Archives, Deborah Edel and Joan Nestle, both had cats as animal companions. A series of cats lived alongside the organization's collections when they were stored in the apartment of Nestle in New York City's Upper West Side from the 1970s to the 1990s. Nestle described the history of pets in the archives as "another moment in our history" and said that their history "with these beings [is] part of our lesbian history."

== Pets as emotional support ==
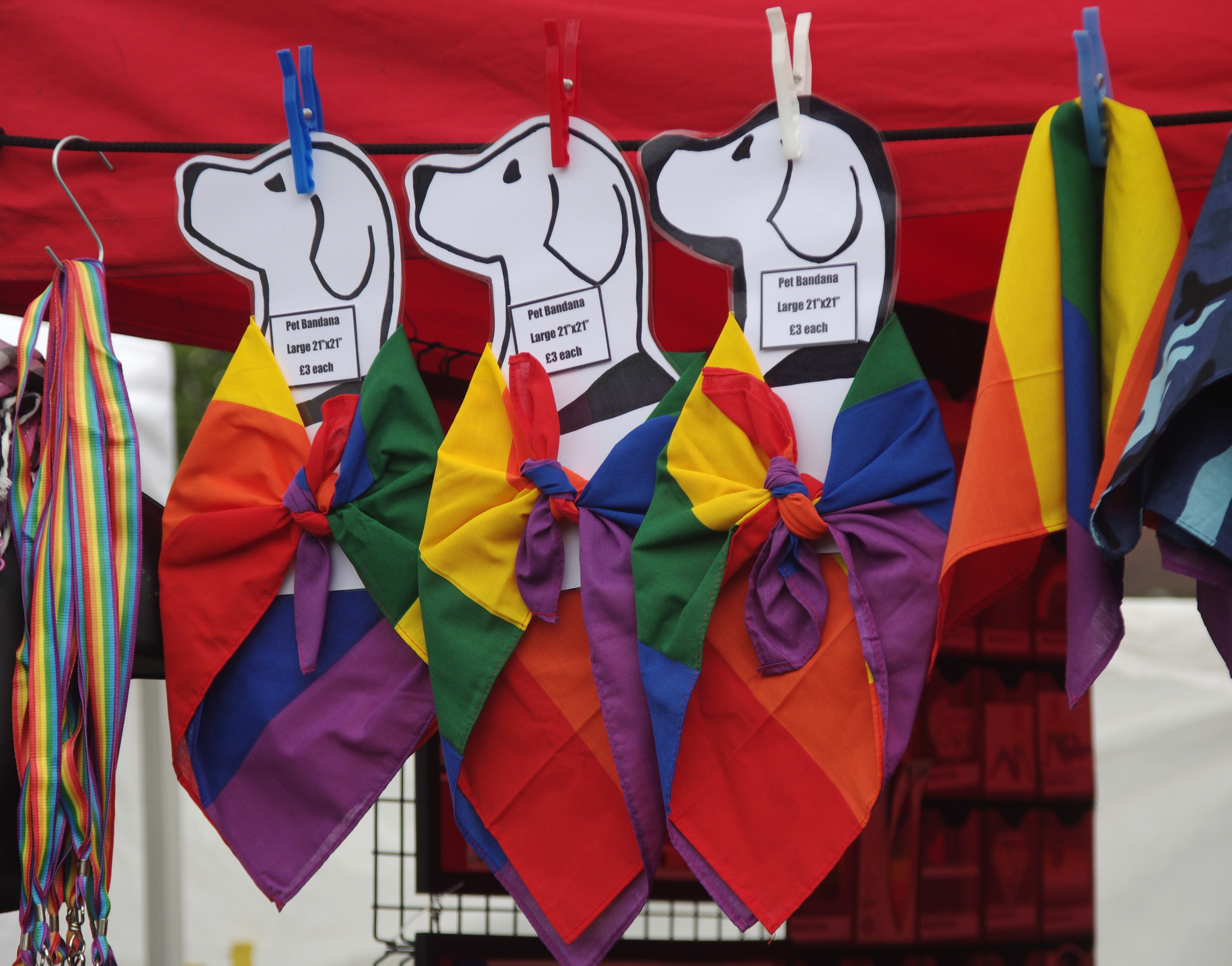
Rainbow-colored bandanas for pets at Nottingham Pride, 2010

Gay and bisexual men may be more likely to look to pets as means of support, as they are more likely to live alone and less likely to have children than heterosexual men. Among older LGBTQ populations, pets may have a positive impact on a person's mental health and feeling of social support. A 1999 study shows that gay men with HIV/AIDS were less likely to be depressed if they had a pet. A 2019 study shows that pet ownership may act as a net stressor on gay and bisexual men with prostate cancer.

=== Pets and transgender individuals ===
Pets can also be an important outlet for companionship and support for transgender individuals. As trans people are more likely to experience discrimination from the human relationships they have with their family and friends, as well as mental health anguish (e.g., anxiety, depression, or gender dysphoria), having a pet may provide the love and companionship they need. A pet is a non-judgmental companion who won't alienate a person because of their gender identity; the affection and loyalty that both pet owner and pet provide each other is what makes their relationship work.

A pet can provide unconditional love that a trans person may need after facing rejection from the people in their lives. Animals cannot comprehend human-constructed gender norms and identity. So, a person's gender expression becomes irrelevant to the love and support a pet can provide, as they do not discriminate based on how a person looks. A pet can be a stable emotional support system for trans individuals going through many other relationship changes in their lives. This is vital as they come to terms with their identity and potentially undergo gender-affirming surgery that may affect their current relationships with family and friends, as these realizations and changes can lead to rejection. In 2024, another paper in the International Journal of Transgender Health examined "more-than-human relationships as experienced by trans people and their animal companions" and called for thinking what it means to "claim the category 'human' when it is so often premised upon exclusion."

== See also ==
- Homosexual behavior in animals
- Same-sex parenting
