= May Mandelbaum Edel =

American anthropologist (1909–1964)

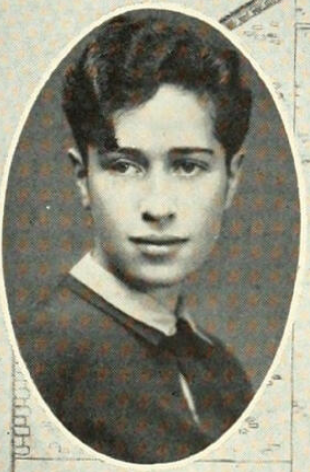
- May Mandelbaum, from the 1929 yearbook of Barnard College
- Born: December 1, 1909; New York City, New York, U.S.
- Died: May 23, 1964 (aged 54); Kew Gardens General Hospital in Queens, New York, U.S.
- Education: Barnard College; Columbia University
- Known for: Cultural anthropology
- Spouse: Abraham Edel
- Children: Matthew Edel; Deborah Edel
- Scientific career
- Thesis: (1940)
- Academic advisors: Franz Boaz; Ruth Benedict

May Mandelbaum Edel (1 December 1909 – 23 May 1964) was an American anthropologist known for her fieldwork among the Okanagan in Washington, the Tillamook in Oregon, and the Kiga in Uganda. Edel's linguistic research of the Tillamook serves as the only published account of the language which provided data for future linguistic publications. Edel was the first American woman anthropologist to live in an African village, and her research in Africa documented the diversity of African cultures.

== Early life and education ==
May Mandelbaum Edel was born in New York on December 1, 1909, to a Brooklyn physician. Edel had two brothers, Melvin and Joseph Mandelbaum. She began her studies at Barnard College in 1925, where she took graduate anthropology courses taught by anthropologists Franz Boas and Ruth Benedict at Columbia University. Edel obtained a Bachelor of Art degree from Barnard College in 1929. She entered anthropological research at a time when there were very limited jobs and fieldwork research funding available to women.

Edel went on to pursue graduate studies at Columbia University and worked closely with Franz Boas. From 1930 to 1931, Edel served as a research assistant to Franz Boas while conducting fieldwork among the Okanagan in Washington and the Tillamook in Oregon. During this period, Edel also gave lectures to teachers at the American Museum of Natural History, which brought to her attention the potential impact of anthropology on education.

== Fieldwork among the Okanagan and Tillamook ==
Edel conducted fieldwork among the Okanagan in Washington, the Tillamook in Oregon, and the Kiga in Uganda. She began conducting fieldwork among the Okanagan in Washington in 1930 prior to pursuing her doctoral dissertation research among the Tillamook. Her findings from research among the Okanagan Indians was published in 1938.

In the summer of 1931, Edel went to conduct fieldwork among the Tillamook in Oregon sponsored by the Council of Learned Societies. The Tillamook language is part of the Salish family, spoken by groups living along the river mouths in the northern Oregon coast, ranging from the Nehalem River to the Siletz River. Edel employed Clara Pearson, who was fluent in the Nehalem language as well as Jane and Lizzie Adams and Jane's daughter, Mrs. Nota Goff.

Franz Boas later requested Melville Jacobs to collect information about dialects in the Garibaldi area in Oregon to provide more grammatical material for Edel's doctoral dissertation. Jacobs conducted fieldwork from November to December 1933, supported by a grant from the ACLS Joint Committee on Native American Languages. Jacobs recorded text from Clara Pearson, although, she could no longer work as a linguistic informant, so Jacobs worked with Mrs. Ellen Center, the only known informant at the time of Jacob's fieldwork. Center provided vocabulary and short phrases for grammatical research but was not able to provide texts. The materials Jacobs had collected, along with what Boas had collected earlier in 1890 and Edel's field notes from her 1931 research, served as Edel's grammar research, which is the only published account of the Tillamook language.

Edel's PhD thesis focused on the Tillamook language. Her thesis served as a monograph for the International Journal of American Linguistics and was published in 1939. Edel continued her graduate studies at Columbia University in 1932 and was awarded a PhD in anthropology from Columbia University in 1940 after her dissertation was published.

== Fieldwork among the Kiga people in Uganda ==
Edel also conducted fieldwork among the Kiga people, in Uganda, identified in her publications as the Bachiga, Chiga, and the Ciga, in 1932. These are all outdated spellings of Kiga. Edel became interested in Ugandan communities after Boas secured a small grant for her to work with Ernest Kabila to translate and edit a book on the Baganda by Sir Apolo Kagwa, titled Customs of the Baganda (1934). Edel was a graduate student at the time, and it sparked her interested in African studies. After her doctoral dissertation, Edel went on to pursue field research in Uganda.

Edel was awarded a fellowship by the National Research Council for research in Uganda from October 1932 to January 1934, and she postponed her marriage to Abraham Edel for one year until after she returned from Africa. Edel supplemented this fellowship with a grant from the Anthropology Department at Columbia University [3]. Edel spent a full year among the Kiga people on the Bafuka peninsula on Lake Bunyonyi in the Kigezi District. She was the first American woman anthropologist to live in an African village, in the village of Bafuka, Uganda, which was noted in the American Anthropologist. Edel's linguistic training allowed her to work in vernacular speech, which was a necessity given that there were not interpreters available to aid her research.

The Kiga live in the Kigezi county of Uganda and speak a Bantu dialect related to Nyoro. The language and cultural practices of the Kiga people are similar to those of communities in Ankole, Mpororo and Ruanda. Edel studied tribal horticultural systems; the basis of Kiga livelihood was horticulture and yams, eleusine, and millet are staple foods. Edel utilized her studies of horticulture to study patterns of property-holding among the Kiga people related to agriculture and animal use. Edel's research demonstrated the variability in African social systems, a phenomenon under-acknowledged by Western scholars at the time.

Edel collaborated with local researchers and cultural institutions throughout her research in Uganda. Edel actively collaborated with those at the International African Institute, including Professor Daryll Forde and Mrs. Beatrice Wyatt. She donated a description of Kiga material culture to the Uganda Museum in Kampala for further study and research purposes. Edel also remained in active contact with other anthropologists during her studies. She received guidance on her African studies from Audrey Richards, Bronislaw Malinowski, Diedrich Westermann, and Lucy Mair as well as Ruth Benedict, Margaret Mead, and Franz Boas.

Edel corresponded with Ruth Benedict regarding her contribution to Margaret Mead's Cooperation and Competition, which included Edel's preliminary findings as a chapter titled "The Bachiga of East Africa." Her full monograph was published in 1957 as The Chiga of Western Uganda. When Mead's book was written, there were two post-doctorates associated with her, including Edel and Ruth Landes. Edel and Landes met with Mead and four other associated graduate students in the Department of Anthropology to discuss results and working hypotheses related to each researcher's culture of study. Correspondence between Franz Boas and May Mandelbaum Edel related to her trip to Africa are currently housed in the American Philosophical Society Library.

After returning from Africa, she married American philosopher Dr. Abraham Edel in 1934, and they collaborated on the book Anthropology and Ethics. This study focused on morality as a specific focus of anthropological studies. Abraham Edel served as a professor of philosophy at City College in New York and encouraged Edel to contemplate comparing ethical systems in different societies. In her book The Chiga of Western Uganda, Mead also thanked Edel's husband, Abraham Edel, for contributions to her theoretical background. Edel focused on "the relationship of variant systems of ethics to the universal requirements of a human social existence."

== Professional career ==
Edel started teaching anthropology at Brooklyn College in 1941. She taught many evening classes for teachers and for other students that worked during the day. Edel was blacklisted and prevented from continuing to teach at Brooklyn College because of her political activism. She was an active member of the New York section of the Committee on Anthropology and World Affairs, and as Bunzel noted, "believed that anthropologists had a role and a responsibility in finding ways to peace and fulfillment." In a review of her book The Chiga of Uganda, P.T.W. Baxter notes that "she was traditionally trained but alert to contemporary intellectual issues" and actively involved in contemporary events.

After Edel left teaching in 1941, she had her first child, Matthew Edel. Her second child, Deborah Edel, was born in 1944. Although Edel did not return to teaching anthropology until 1956, she published her research related to the Kiga people in Uganda for young people, mentioned below, and lectured in high schools throughout New York City. She lectured on topics beyond anthropology, including education. Also during her stint away from teaching at universities, Edel also conducted fieldwork in Brownsville, New York, a Jewish neighborhood in Brooklyn in 1947.

Edel's publications also reached younger audiences, including two children's books, The Story of People and The Story of Our Ancestors. The Story of People (1953) describes many different groups of people as an introduction into the science of anthropology. The Story of Our Ancestors (1955) was released two years after her first book. In an obituary published in the American Anthropologist, anthropologist Ruth Bunzel stated that Edel "reached out beyond the walls of academia to those in whose hands the future lay – to the young, whose minds were not yet closed to new orientations."

Edel began teaching again in 1956 at the New School for Social Research, again often teaching evening classes. Unlike her previous teaching at Brooklyn College, her seminars related to African studies focused on "third world" nations and the responsibilities of anthropologists related to the developing countries that they study. In 1960, Edel founded the Anthropology Department at Newark College of Arts and Sciences at Rutgers University. Edel also began teaching at the same time as an assistant professor of anthropology at Rutgers and remained in the position until 1964. After Edel's death, a fund was established in hers name at Rutgers University to further the field of anthropology.

== Later life ==
Edel remained in Queens, New York throughout her life. May Mandelbaum Edel died on May 23, 1964, after an illness lasting more than a year in Kew Gardens General Hospital in Queens, New York at the age of 54. She was survived by her husband Abraham Edel and her son, the economist Matthew Edel, and daughter Deborah Edel, who is one of the co-founders of the Lesbian Herstory Archives. After Edel's death, Abraham Edel married philosopher Elizabeth Flower, who died in 1995. Abraham Edel died in 2007.

Her life was memorialized in Africa, stating that she "carried out a field study in Uganda, the results of which were published by this Institute in her book The Chiga of Western Uganda (1957)." Anthropologist Ruth Bunzel also wrote an obituary about May Mandelbaum Edel in the American Anthropologist.

The May Mandelbaum Edel papers are currently housed in the National Anthropological Archives, and this paper collection includes her field notes from fieldwork with the Okanagan Indians in Washington and the Kiga in Uganda, language materials, manuscripts, correspondence, teaching materials, and lecture notes taken from courses taught by Franz Boas and Ruth Benedict.

The Schomburg Center for Research in Black Culture in the New York Public Library also houses stories, tales, and drafts of the manuscript related to the Kiga people. This New York Library Collection also contains letters from several African individuals to Edel and Edel's fieldnotes dated 1933 to 1934 related to kinship and religious studies.

== Selected bibliography ==
- 1934 The customs of the Baganda. Vol. 22. New York: Columbia University Press, 1934. (co-authored with Sir Apolo Kagwa, Ernest Balintuma Kalibala, and John Roscoe)
- 1937 "The Bachiga of East Africa." In Cooperation and Competition Among Primitive Peoples. Margaret Mead, ed. New York: McGraw-Hill.
- 1937 "Uganda". American anthropologist, 39 (1), p. 151.
- 1938 "Property among the Ciga in Uganda." Africa: 325–341.
- 1938 "The work of tending the gardens and preparing and storing the crops." Africa: 325.
- 1957 The Chiga of Western Udanga. New York: Oxford University Press for the International African Institute.
- 1968 Anthropology and ethics. Case Western University Press. Republished in 200 by Transaction Publishers and in 2017 by Routledge. (co-authored with Abraham Edel)
