= Arthur Cyrus Warner =

Arthur Cyrus Warner (February 14, 1918 – July 22, 2007) was an American lawyer and gay rights activist. His work was crowned by successful efforts to overturn anti-sodomy and other laws used to persecute gay people in several US states.

== Early life ==
Born in Newark, New Jersey, Warner for almost the last half century of his life lived in the house built by his parents in Princeton. His mother was born in Paynesville, Minnesota, and his father belonged to a family engaged in the wholesale grocery business in Newark. Both parents were of Russian-Jewish origin.

== Education ==
After receiving his AB degree from Princeton in 1938, Warner entered Harvard Law School. His studies there were interrupted by World War II, and he served a stint in the United States Navy, attaining the rank of Second Lieutenant. After receiving an undesirable discharge stemming from homosexual conduct, he returned to Harvard Law school, where he earned his LLB degree in 1946. Although he succeeded, after a long legal battle, in having the Navy discharge changed to the status of honorable, the damage was done, and he was never able to practice law as he had hoped. He then entered Harvard Graduate School to study English history, receiving his AM degree in 1950 and his PhD in 1960. While he briefly taught history at the University of Texas at El Paso, he lived most of his life as an independent scholar, maintaining many contacts from his base in Princeton.

== Activism ==
Arthur Warner's engagement with issues of homosexual civil rights began early, when in the late 1940s he started to attend meetings of a New York City group known simply as The League. From 1954 on he was active in the Mattachine Society of New York, serving as chairman of the legal department. Initially he chose to mask his identity under the name of Austin Wade. For a time Arthur Warner was associated with Frank Kameny of Washington, D.C.; later they had a falling out over strategy. Yet each continued to work in his own way in the service of the cause of gay rights.

In 1971 Warner founded the National Committee for Sexual Civil Liberties (later renamed the American Association for Personal Privacy), a high-level think tank comprising lawyers, historians, theologians, and other professionals. From the beginning, Warner's focus, and that of the group he founded, was legal reform—especially the repeal of the sodomy statutes, which he regarded as the linchpin of all discrimination against homosexuals. He was encouraged by the recommendations for decriminalization of homosexual conduct embodied in the Wolfenden Report in England (1957), and the Model Penal Code (MPC), a statutory text approved by the American Law Institute (ALI) in 1962. Among those closely associated with Warner in this work were Thomas F. Coleman, an attorney; Paul Hardman; and Wayne R. Dynes of the Gay Academic Union.

Working largely behind the scenes, Warner and his associates achieved success in several individual states, preparing the way for the eventual victory in the U. S. Supreme Court in the Lawrence case of 2003.

Arthur Warner's papers document his involvement in legal reform and other issues pertaining to homosexual civil rights. The bulk of the papers consist of legislative and court documents about cases affecting gay civil liberties, and related memoranda, correspondence, and writings. The papers, mainly covering the period from 1946 to 2000, are preserved in the Mudd Manuscript Library, Princeton University Libraries

His will directed that his funds be used to establish the Sentience Foundation, headquartered in Freehold, New Jersey.
