= Dear friend La Moussaye =

French satyrical poem

Dear friend La Moussaye is a satyrical poem in macaronic verse written in 1643 in Latin and attributed to Louis de Bourbon, Prince of Condé.

== History ==
Louis, Prince of Condé (1621-1686) is said to have written the poem in an exchange of letters with his friend and aide-de-camp Amaury III de Goyon, Marquis de La Moussaye (1601-1674), when he was twenty-two years old. The poem features Condé and de La Moussaye traveling on the river Rhone, surprised by a thunderstorm, Conde exclaimed "We are going to drown!" to which de La Moussaye is said to have answered: "Our lives are safe, for we are sodomites" ie. homosexuals.

According to Professor Mark Bannister, Prince of Condé was known in his youth as a libertine noble motivated by a desire to shock and "to ridicule the protocol to which a Prince du Sang was expected to conform". Condé was also prepared to use his authority to take the defence of "sodomites", while evoking the subject of homosexuality in songs, was a form of self-derision. According to Christian Kühner, lecturer in history at the University of Freiburg, for young libertine nobles, playing with the forbidden, like homosexuality or atheistic opinions, was also a way of strengthening a relationship.

The refrain "Landerirette" indicates that the dialogue was very likely sung, possibly to a tune that both correspondents would have sung together on their shared travels and military campaigns.

== Content ==
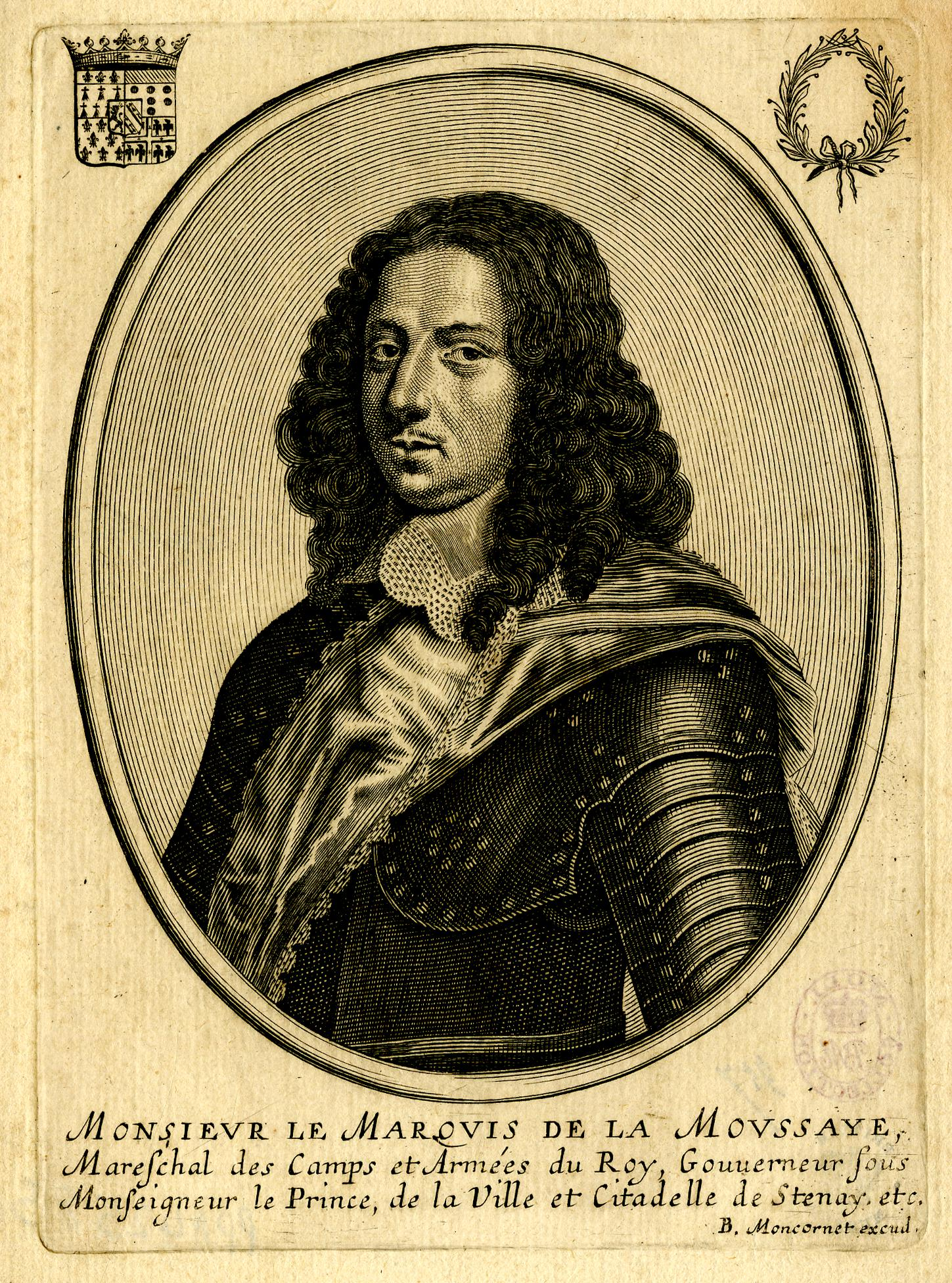
Marquis de La Moussaye (1601-1674)

Grand Condé:

Carus amicus Mussœus, Ah! Deus bone! quod tempus! Landerirette; Imbre sumus perituri, Landeriri.	Dear friend La Moussaye Ah! Good God! What weather! Landerirette, We are going to drown, Landeridi.

Marquis de La Moussaye:

Securæ sunt nostræ vitæ, Sumus enim Sodomitæ; Landerirette; Igne tantum perituri, Landeriri.	Our lives are safe, For we are sodomites. Landerirette, And shall perish only by fire, Landeridi.

== Legacy ==
The playfulness element about the protagonists sexual preferences appealed to Marcel Proust who quoted the poem in In Search of Lost Time. The insinuation made in the last verse was use by one of Condé's former allies, Conte Jean de Coligny-Saligny, who after an altercation with the Prince became his most heinous enemy. The poem was also reported by Elizabeth Charlotte, Duchess of Orléans, the famous Versailles gossipmonger, who questioned whether Condé really made a confession. In the Encyclopedia of Homosexuality, published in 1990, "Dear friend La Moussaye" was incorrectly attributed to Prince Eugene of Savoy.

== Sources ==
- De Chouvigny De Blot, C. (1919). Chansons libertines (in French).
- Descharmes, B.; Heuser, E.A.; Krüger, C.; Loy, T.; Asch, R.G.; Dabringhaus, S.; Gander, H.H. (2011). Varieties of friendship: Interdisciplinary perspectives on social relationships. V&R Unipress. ISBN 978-3-86234-108-5.
- Brunet, G. (1857). Le Nouveau siècle de Louis XIV; Choix de chansons: historiques et satiriques, accompagnées de notes par le traducteur de la Correspondance de Madame Duchesse d'Orléans (in French). Librairie de Garnier frères.
- Marcel Proust (1923). A la recherche du temps perdu. A la recherche du temps perdu (in French). Librairie Gallimard.
- Hammond, N. (2019). The Powers of Sound and Song in Early Modern Paris. Perspectives on Sensory History. Penn State University Press. ISBN 978-0-271-08553-1.
- Orléans, C.E.; Brunet, G. (1863). Correspondance complète de madame duchesse d'Orléans (in French). Charpentier.
- Tin, L.G.; Redburn, M. (2008). The Dictionary of Homophobia: A Global History of Gay & Lesbian Experience. Arsenal Pulp Press. ISBN 978-1-55152-314-9.
- Bannister, M. (2017). Conde in Context: Ideological Change in Seventeenth-century France. Taylor & Francis. ISBN 978-1-351-19833-2.
- Dynes, W.R. (2016). Encyclopedia of Homosexuality: Volume I. Routledge Revivals: Encyclopedia of Homosexuality. Taylor & Francis. ISBN 978-1-317-36814-4.
