= Texas State University Department of Philosophy =

- Chairperson: Craig Hanks
- Location: San Marcos, Texas
- Website: txstate.edu/philosophy/

The Texas State University Department of Philosophy is an academic division in the College of Liberal Arts at Texas State University. It has particular strengths in applied philosophy, moral philosophy, environmental ethics, philosophy of technology and political philosophy.

== Philosophy Dialogue Series ==
The Philosophy Dialogue Series is a forum for the "exchange and critical evaluation of diverse ideas". It includes about 60 presentations in each semester and has been held for over 20 years.

== MAAPE ==
The Master’s Program in Applied Philosophy and Ethics (MAAPE), opened in August 2010, is the largest philosophy master’s program in Texas.

== Accomplishments ==
Since the Ethics Bowl began, the Texas State team has won the regional competition several times and advanced to the national tournament.

== Chairs ==
- Craig Hanks (2014-)
- Vincent Luizzi (1982-2014)

== Faculty ==
Tisist is limited to those with. individual articles in wikipedia

- Alejandro Barcenas Pardo
- Vincent Luizzi
