= Same-Sex Desire and Love in Greco-Roman Antiquity and in the Classical Tradition of the West =

2005 history book

- Editor: Beerte C. Verstraete, Vernon L. Provencal
- Genre: Nonfiction
- Publisher: Harrington Park Press, Haworth Press
- Publication date: 2005
- Pages: 505
- ISBN: 978-1560236047

Same-Sex Desire and Love in Greco-Roman Antiquity and in the Classical Tradition of the West is a 2005 classical history book edited by American historians Beert C. Verstraete and Vernon Provencal.

The book contains contributions written by academics including W. A. Percy, Thomas F. Scanlon, Charles Hupperts, Anne Klink, Thomas Hubbard, James Butrica, Armando Maggi, Wayne Dynes, John Lauritsen, Donald Mader and Amy Richlin, as well as two essays authored by Procencal and Verstraete themselves. Another paper by Bruce Rind had originally been included in the book.

== See also ==
- The Age of Marriage in Ancient Rome (2003)
