= Whitney Chewston =

Meme dog

- Whitney as depicted in the first of many "homophobic dog" memes
- Other name: Homophobic Dog
- Species: Dog (Canis familiaris)
- Breed: Miniature dachshund
- Sex: Female
- Born: September 8, 2016 (age 10); Columbus, Ohio, U.S.
- Occupation: Internet celebrity
- Years active: 2021–present
- Known for: Internet meme
- Owners: Logan Hickman and Ben Campbell
- Residence: Scottsdale, Arizona, U.S.
- Appearance: White miniature dachshund
- Named after: Whitney Houston

Instagram information
- Page: whitney_chewston
- Followers: 160,000 (as of September 2026)

Whitney Chewston (born September 8, 2016), also known as the homophobic dog, is a miniature dachshund who became the subject of an internet meme in 2021. An Instagram page for the dog has gained a significant following, with over 160,000 followers as of September 2026.

== Career ==
Whitney began her social media journey on Instagram as a result of her owners wanting to share puppy photos with their families. After several complaints about how many puppy photos were being shared on their personal pages, Whitney was given a personal account to post from. She gained notable traction within Columbus, becoming a local internet celebrity and the subject of many articles, while hovering at around 40,000 followers in early 2021. She is owned by a gay couple in Phoenix, Arizona.

In March 2021, an Instagram user added the text "not too fond of gay people" to a 2019 photo of Whitney beside a glass of red wine. This image circulated on social media and grew in popularity in early 2022 on Twitter, gaining Whitney the nickname Homophobic Dog. The format of the meme adapted as it spread; users, who were often LGBTQ, superimposed homophobic captions on other photos of Whitney "often looking sassy or suspicious".

On May 15, 2022, a tweet of a fake Washington Post article titled "This dog is the new face of online homophobia", claimed to be written by Taylor Lorenz, accrued nearly 450,000 likes in 24 hours. Several accounts responded to the fake headline with criticism of The Washington Post, including Christina Pushaw, spokesperson of Florida governor Ron DeSantis. Lorenz responded to Pushaw, writing, "I would have assumed a press secretary could recognise the difference between a fake screenshot from a meme page and a real news story, but apparently not". On May 16, the fake title was used as the headline for an article about Whitney in LGBTQ Nation.

== See also ==
- List of individual dogs
- Lists of dogs
- Gay icon
- Pets and the LGBT community
