= Jonathan Dunn-Rankin =

American actor (1930–2014)

- Born: November 30, 1930 (age 95); Hackensack, New Jersey, U.S.
- Died: December 12, 2014 (aged 84); San Diego, California, U.S.
- Education: Rollins College; Columbia University Graduate School of Journalism
- Partner: David Ramos

Jonathan Dunn-Rankin (November 30, 1930 – December 12, 2014) was an American actor, television journalist, and gay activist.

== Early life ==
Jonathan Dunn-Rankin was born on November 30, 1930, in Hackensack, New Jersey. He graduated from Rollins College after serving in the United States Army in France, and he earned a master's degree from the Columbia University Graduate School of Journalism in 1958.

== Career ==
Dunn-Rankin interned at CBS News in New York City. He later worked as a television journalist in Florida, Cleveland, and Phoenix. From 1965 to 1977, he worked for KFMB-TV, a television station based in San Diego. Dunn-Rankin also became a stage actor at the Old Globe Theatre in San Diego.

Dunn-Rankin was a co-founder of the San Diego Democratic Club, a leader of the Gay Academic Union, and a supporter of the Lambda Archives of San Diego in its early days. He was also the chairman of the Diversionary Theatre, an LGBT theater in San Diego.

== Personal life and death ==
Dunn-Rankin had a partner, David Ramos, and resided in San Diego. He died on December 12, 2014.
