= Warren Johansson =

American philologist (1934–1994)

Warren Johansson (February 21, 1934 – June 10, 1994) was a philologist, author and a leading American gay scholar during his lifetime. He was founding member of the Scholarship Committee of the Gay Academic Union.

== Biography ==
Warren Johansson was born in 1934, in Philadelphia, with the name Philip Joseph Wallfield. His father was Jewish (and is said to have been killed with a shotgun by robbers in his pharmacy). At some point in his later career, Philip changed his name to the Nordic-sounding Warren Johansson, to express his disapproval of Jewish homophobia.

His first venture into gay scholarship was to co-author Greek Love with the numismatist and later convicted child sex offender Walter H. Breen, who wrote under the name J. Z. Eglinton.

He abandoned formal academic studies (at Columbia University) but did not obtain a Ph.D. Johansson made himself a master of all the modern European languages (excepting only Basque, Hungarian, and Finnish) as well as of Greek, Latin, Hebrew and Aramaic. He used his linguistic abilities to read deeply and spent much of his life in research libraries, particularly at Columbia, where his extensive knowledge of obscure Slavonic dialects made him a valuable informal resource to scholars in the Russian department. William Armstrong Percy cites just one example of Johansson's surprising discoveries: while the British Wolfenden Committee was sitting, Johannson unearthed the by-now-famous citation from Sigmund Freud, to the effect that homosexuals were not sick, and sent it off. Later, he provided expert testimony to legislative bodies in several countries including Luxembourg, Moldova and Argentina.

Johansson apparently ran through a couple of bequests in record time: at one point he was driving a Mercedes in California, but most of the time he was penniless, and slept in public places such as libraries while keeping his few possessions in storage lockers. As Percy points out, Johansson came to see himself as a model of the Talmudic scholar, and thought it only fair that he should receive room and board in exchange for providing what amounted to an advanced post-graduate education in gay studies, gratis.

Author and historian William Armstrong Percy has called Johansson "simply the most extraordinary person I have ever known."

== Works ==
- Wayne Dynes and Warren Johansson (editors), Encyclopedia of Homosexuality, Taylor & Francis 1990. ISBN 9780824065447
- Warren Johansson and William Percy, Outing: Shattering the Conspiracy of Silence, Haworth Gay and Lesbian Studies, Routledge 1994. ISBN 9781560230410
- Warren Johansson, Ex parte Themis: The Historical Guilt of the Christian Church, Gay Academic Union, New York 1981. Also in: Warren Johansson, Wayne Dynes, John Lauritsen, Homosexuality, Intolerance, and Christianity: A Critical Examination of John Boswell's Work, Pink Triangle Trust Library, 1985 & 2003.
- Warren Johansson, "London's Medieval Sodomites." The Cabirion and Gay Books Bulletin, no. 10 (Winter-Spring 1984), pp. 6–9 and 34.
- Warren Johansson, "Whosoever shall say to his brother, ‘Racha’", The Cabirion and Gay Books Bulletin, no. 10 (Winter-Spring 1984), pp. 2–4. Also in: Wayne Dynes & Stephen Donaldson (editors), Studies in Homosexuality, vol. XII: Homosexuality and Religion and Philosophy, Garland, New York & London 1992, pp. 212–214.
- Warren Johansson and William Percy, Homosexuality in the Middle Ages (online pdf).

== Literature ==
- William A. Percy, "Warren Johansson," in Vern Bullough, Before Stonewall (Harrington Park Press, 2002).
