= Censoring Sex Research =

2013 book

Censoring Sex Research: The Debate Over Male Intergenerational Relations
- Author: Thomas K. Hubbard and Beert Verstraete
- Genre: Nonfiction
- Publisher: Routledge, Left Coast Press
- Publication date: 2013
- Pages: 368
- ISBN: 978-1611323399

Censoring Sex Research: The Debate Over Male Intergenerational Relations is a 2013 anthropology book edited by Thomas Hubbard and Beert C. Verstraete.

The book includes contributions by sociologist David Greenberg, biologist Eric Alcorn, researchers Bruce Rind, Don Mader, Gert Hekma, Andrew Heller, Richard McAnulty, Lester Wright Jr., Patrick O’Neill, Janice Best and Richard Yuill, as well as one chapter co-written by Hubbard.
