= Abraham Edel =

American philosopher and ethicist

Abraham Edel (6 December 1908 – 22 June 2007) was an American philosopher and ethicist. He was the younger brother of the North American literary critic and biographer Leon Edel, and the uncle of the composer Joel Mandelbaum. He was married three times; his first two wives were fellow academics and co-authors, the anthropologist May Mandelbaum Edel, the philosopher Elizabeth Flower, and Sima Szaluta respectively.

He had two children Deborah Edel, a founder of the Lesbian Herstory Archives, and Matthew Edel, an Economist.

Born in Pittsburgh, Pennsylvania, he grew up in Yorkton, Saskatchewan. Edel attended McGill University, Oxford University and Columbia University. He taught at City College of New York for more than 40 years, and then held a research appointment at the University of Pennsylvania until his death. He was the recipient of numerous academic honors.

== Selected bibliography ==
- Ethical Judgment: The Use of Science in Ethics (1955)
- Method in Ethical Theory (1963)
- Anthropology and Ethics (1959) (with May Mandelbaum Edel)
- Exploring Fact and Value (1980)
- Analyzing Concepts in Social Science (1979)
- The Struggle for Academic Democracy: Lessons from the 1938 "Revolution" in New York's City Colleges (1990)
- Critique of Applied Ethics: Reflections and Recommendations (1994) (with Elizabeth Flower and Finbarr W. O'Connor)
- Ethical Theory and Social Change (2001)
