= Craig Hanks =

American philosopher

James Craig Hanks
- Born: October 16, 1961 (age 64); Canyon, Texas
- Awards: NEH Distinguished Teaching Professor 2009-2012; PAWS Preview Namesake Professor

Education
- Education: Duke University (Ph.D.); Texas A&M (B.A.)
- Thesis: Jürgen Habermas and the Colonization of the Lifeworld (1991)
- Doctoral advisor: Rick Roderick

Philosophical work
- Era: 21st century Philosophy
- Region: Western philosophy
- School: Pragmatism
- Institutions: Texas State University
- Main interests: philosophy of technology, critical theory, applied philosophy

James Craig Hanks (born October 16, 1961) is an American philosopher and Professor of Philosophy at Texas State University. He is known for his expertise on critical theory and philosophy of technology. Hanks has been the Chair of Philosophy at Texas State University since 2014.

== Books ==
- Refiguring Critical Theory: Jürgen Habermas and the Possibilities of Political Change, University Press of America, 2002
- Philosophy and Critical Thinking (Texas State University Philosophy 1305), Thomson, 2006
- Technology and Values: Essential Readings (ed.), Wiley-Blackwell, 2010
- Technological Musings: Reflections on Technology and Values, forthcoming
- Technology and Transcendence, forthcoming
