= Mabel Hampton =

American activist, dancer, philanthropist (1902–1989)

- Hampton c. 1919
- Born: May 2, 1902; Winston-Salem, North Carolina
- Died: October 26, 1989 (aged 87); New York City, New York
- Organization: Lesbian Herstory Archives
- Known for: Dancing, gay activism, domestic work
- Movement: Harlem Renaissance

Mabel Hampton (May 2, 1902 – October 26, 1989) was an American lesbian activist, a dancer during the Harlem Renaissance, and a volunteer for both Black and lesbian/gay organizations. She was a significant contributor to the Lesbian Herstory Archives.

== Early life ==
Hampton was born in Winston-Salem, North Carolina, on May 2, 1902. Her mother died when she was two months old from poison; she was raised for seven years by her maternal grandmother. After her grandmother died from a stroke, Hampton, at age 7, boarded a train to New York City. She lived there with her aunt and uncle for a short time. However, Hampton received poor treatment from this side of her family, including being sexually assaulted by her uncle. She ran away after a year, and lived with a white family in New Jersey from ages 8 to 17.

In 1919, while attending a women-only party in Harlem, Hampton was falsely imprisoned for sex work and was sentenced by corrupt Judge Jean Hortense Norris to time in the Bedford Hills Correctional Facility for Women. Hampton was released after serving 13 months of her three-year sentence. The condition of her release forbade her from being in New York.

== Later life and career ==
In the 1920s, Hampton danced in exclusively Black productions alongside Harlem Renaissance stars such as Gladys Bentley. She performed at The Garden of Joy club and sang in the Lafayette Theatre Chorus. Hampton was able to connect with other dancers, artists, and LGBT people through this work.

Hampton left the chorus lines once demand diminished. She then became a hospital attendant and cleaning person for white families, retaining this career for a long time. Hampton met Joan Nestle at this time, the daughter of one of the families she worked for, and developed a strong friendship with her.

Hampton met Lillian B. Foster in 1932, and they remained a couple up until Foster died in 1978.

Hampton then participated in the New York City Defense Recreation Committee in 1943, collecting cigarettes and other items for American World War II soldiers.

Hampton was an activist for gay and lesbian rights. She joined the Lesbian Herstory Archives in New York City in the mid-1970s, an organization co-founded by Joan Nestle. She contributed many physical artifacts and participated in several oral history recordings for the Archives. Hampton also worked for SAGE, an organization dedicated to providing for and supporting elderly queer people.

Hampton contributed monetarily to the Martin Luther King Memorial Fund as well as gay and lesbian organizations in spite of her working-class income. She also attended performances of the Negro Opera Company, and appeared in the films Silent Pioneers and Before Stonewall, which both document the struggle for obtaining gay rights. In addition to this, Hampton marched in the National March on Washington for Lesbian and Gay Rights, which took place in 1979. She spoke at the New York City Lesbian and Gay Pride Parade in 1984. She was also named the grand marshal for the New York City Gay Pride March in 1985. The same year, she received a lifetime achievement award from the National Coalition of Black Lesbians and Gays. Hampton also attended and spoke at Old Lesbians Organizing for Change's first West Coast Conference in 1987.

Hampton died from pneumonia on October 26, 1989, at St. Luke's-Roosevelt Hospital Center.

== Legacy ==
Hampton was included after her death in the documentary Not Just Passing Through.

Hampton donated memorabilia, ephemera, letters, academic publications, documentary records, and lesbian pulp fiction which she had collected throughout her career to the Lesbian Herstory Archives in 1976.

Following her death, Hampton was featured on the front pages of the Lesbian Herstory Archives Newsletter #11, January 1990, in which her legacy was honored.

Joan Nestle, after recording Hampton's oral histories in the late seventies, delivered "'I Lift My Eyes to the Hill': the Life of Mabel Hampton as Told by a White Woman", the first Kessler Lecture for the CUNY Center for Lesbian and Gay Studies, in 1992.
