= Pederasty and Pedagogy in Archaic Greece =

1996 book

- Author: William Armstrong Percy III
- Publisher: University of Illinois Press
- Publication date: 1996
- Pages: 260
- ISBN: 978-0252022098

Pederasty and Pedagogy in Archaic Greece is a book written by University of Massachusetts history professor William Armstrong Percy III. It was published by the University of Illinois Press in 1996.

== See also ==
- Archaic Greece
