= Alejandro Bárcenas =

American philosopher

Alejandro Barcenas Pardo

Education
- Education: University of Hawaii at Manoa

Philosophical work
- Era: 21st century Philosophy
- Region: Western philosophy
- School: Renaissance philosophy
- Institutions: Texas State University
- Main interests: political philosophy, comparative philosophy
- Website: http://www.latinamericanhistory.net/index.html

Alejandro Barcenas Pardo is a Venezuelan philosopher and assistant professor of Philosophy at Texas State University. He is known for his expertise on Machiavelli's thought.

== Books ==
- Machiavelli's Art of Politics. Leiden & Boston: Brill, 2015. 175 pages. ISBN 9789004298002

=== Translations ===
- Tao Te Ching by Lao Tzu. Translation and introduction. Anamnesis, 2014. 182 pages. ISBN 9781500909437.
- El Arte de la Guerra by Sun Tzu. Translation and introduction. Anamnesis, 2014. 72 pages. ISBN 9781495385384.
- El Príncipe by Niccolò Machiavelli. Translation and introduction. Anamnesis, 2013. 184 pages. ISBN 9781495447839.
- El Príncipe by Niccolò Machiavelli. Translation, introduction and notes with José Rafael Herrera. Caracas, Venezuela: Los Libros de El Nacional, Colección Ares No 12, 1999 (reprint 2004, 2006). 125 pages. ISBN 9806423364.
