= Wayne R. Dynes =

American historian (1934–2021)

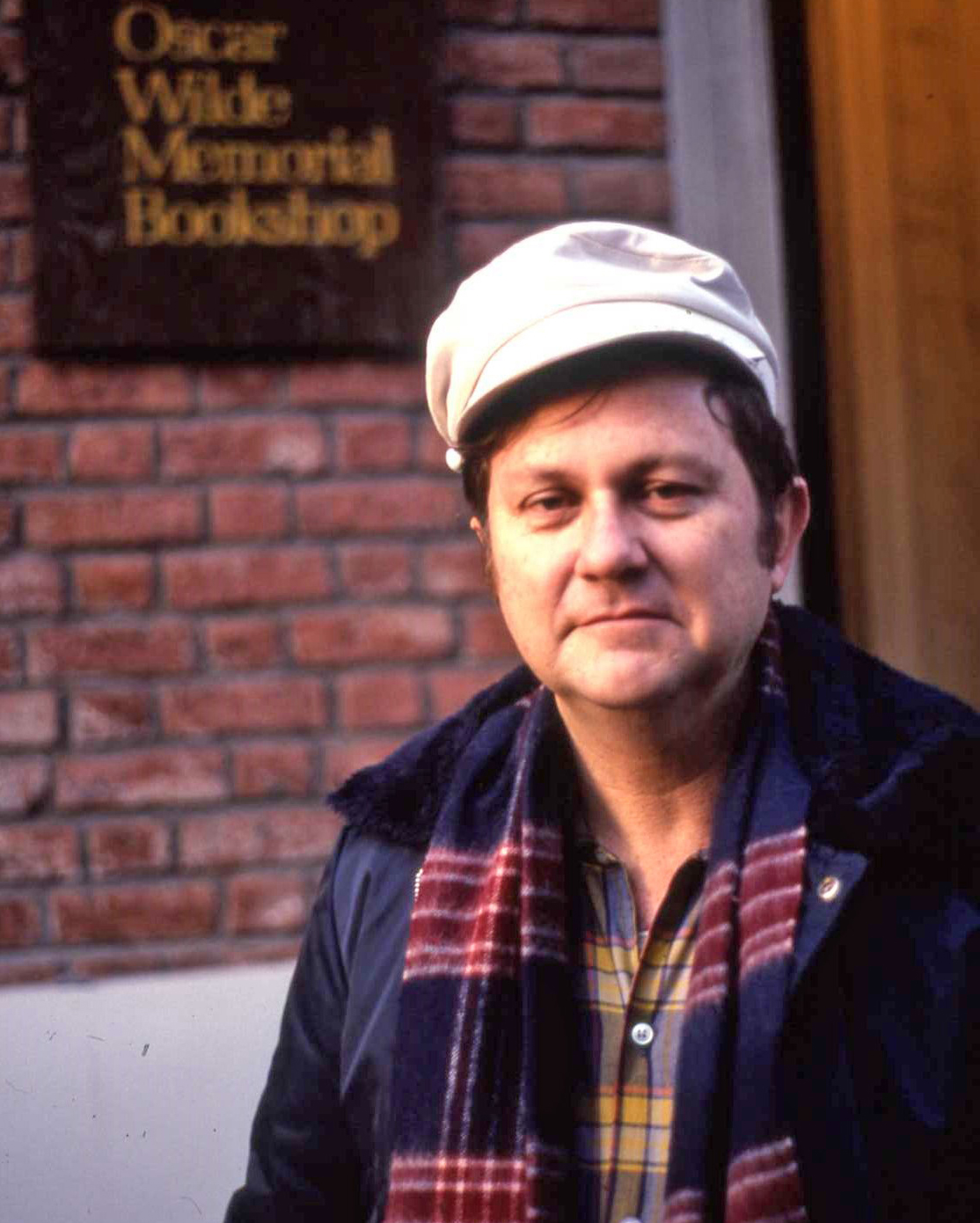
- Wayne Dynes in 1984
- Born: August 23, 1934; Fort Worth, Texas, U.S.
- Died: July 2021 (aged 86); New York City, U.S.
- Occupations: Art historian, encyclopedist, and bibliographer
- Known for: Gay scholarship

Wayne R. Dynes (August 23, 1934 – late July 2021) was an American art historian, encyclopedist, and bibliographer. He was professor emeritus in the Art Department at Hunter College, where he taught from 1972 to the mid-2000s.

Dynes spent his early years in southern California, where he attended the University of California, Los Angeles, and received his B.A. in art history. After extended sojourns in Italy and England, he settled permanently in Manhattan, where he obtained his Ph.D. from the Institute of Fine Arts of New York University. The subject of his dissertation was the eleventh-century illuminated Stavelot Bible from Belgium. His training as a medievalist provided the basic core of his college teaching, first at Columbia University, then at Hunter College.

During the 1960s Dynes was a member of the Mattachine Society of New York. He was in Europe at the time of the Stonewall Uprising in Greenwich Village in June 1969. After returning in 1973 he collaborated with Jack Stafford, a librarian, to work on a bibliography of gay studies, which became his Homosexuality: A Research Guide (1987), followed by his work as editor-in-chief of the two-volume Encyclopedia of Homosexuality (Garland, 1990).

For several years Dynes was active in the Gay Academic Union, editing and publishing its periodical The Cabirion.

== Works ==
- The Styles of European Art, ed. Ursula Hatje (translator, with Richard Waterhouse). London: Thames & Hudson, 1965.
- Bartolomeu Dos Santos: Graphic Works. London: Graphic Art Associates, 1967.
- Palaces of Europe. Great Buildings of the World. London: Hamlyn, 1968.
- Cloister Symposium, 1972 (co-editor, with Florens Deuchler). Fort Tryon Park: International Center of Medieval Art, 1973.
- "Concept of Gothic", in Dictionary of the History of Ideas, ed. Philip P. Wiener. New York: Charles Scribner's Sons, 1973.
- The Illuminations of the Stavelot Bible. New York: Garland, 1978.
- Gay Books Bulletin (editor). Nos. 1–9. New York: Scholarship Committee of the New York Chapter of the Gay Academic Union, 1982–83. Continued under the title The Cabirion and Gay Books Bulletin. Nos. 10–12. 1984–85.
- "Foreword", in Rough News, Daring Views by Jim Kepner. Harrington Park Press, 1998.
- "Afterword", in Reflections on the American Homosexual Rights Movement by Jim Levin. Gai Saber Monograph, no. 2. New York: Gay Academic Union, 1983.
- Homolexis: A Historical and Cultural Lexicon of Homosexuality. Gai Saber Monograph, no. 4. New York: Gay Academic Union, 1985.
- Hieronymus Bosch and the Canticle of Isaiah (with Marshall Neal Myers). New York: Cabirion Press, 1987.
- Homosexuality: A Research Guide. Garland Reference Library of Social Science, vol. 313. New York: Garland, 1987; London: Routledge, 2019.
- "Art, Language and Romanesque", in Gesta / International Center of Medieval Art, vol. 28 (1989).
- Encyclopedia of Homosexuality (editor-in-chief; associate editors: Stephen Donaldson, Warren Johansson, and William A. Percy). 2 vols. New York: Garland, 1990.
- Major Lines of Investigation in Gay/Lesbian Studies: Critical Synopses of the History and Methodology of Scholarship (with Stephen Donaldson). New York, 1992.
- Studies in Homosexuality (co-editor, with Stephen Donaldson). 13 vols. New York: Garland, 1992. Vol. 1: Homosexuality in the Ancient World. Vol. 2: Ethnographic Studies of Homosexuality. Vol. 3: Asian Homosexuality. Vol. 4: Homosexuality and Homosexuals in the Arts. Vol. 5: History of Homosexuality in Europe and America. Vol. 6: Homosexuality: Discrimination, Criminology, and the Law. Vol. 7: Lesbianism. Vol. 8: Homosexual Themes in Literary Works. Vol. 9: Homosexuality and Medicine, Health, and Science. Vol. 10: Homosexuality and Government, Politics and Prisons. Vol. 11: Homosexuality and Psychology, Psychiatry, and Counseling. Vol. 12: Homosexuality and Religion and Philosophy. Vol. 13: Sociology of Homosexuality.
- "Series Editor's Foreword", in Forms of Desire: Sexual Orientation and the Social Constructionist Controversy, ed. Edward Stein. Garland Lesbian and Gay Studies, vol. 1. New York: Garland, 1992.
- "Wrestling with the Social Boa Constructor", in Forms of Desire: Sexual Orientation and the Social Constructionist Controversy, ed. Edward Stein. Garland Lesbian and Gay Studies, vol. 1. New York: Garland, 1992.
- "Hispanic Homosexuals: A Spanish Lexicon" (with Stephen O. Murray), in Latin American Male Homosexualities, ed. Stephen O. Murray. Albuquerque: University of New Mexico Press, 1995.
- "Portugayese" (with Stephen O. Murray), in Latin American Male Homosexualities, ed. Stephen O. Murray. Albuquerque: University of New Mexico Press, 1995.
- "Queer Studies: In Search of a Discipline", in Academic Questions, vol. 8, no. 4 (1995), pp. 34–52.
- "The Return of the Third Sex", in Journal of Sex Research, vol. 32, no. 4 (1995), pp. 335–337.
- "Medievalism and Le Corbusier", in Gesta / International Center of Medieval Art, vol. 45, no. 2 (2006), pp. 89–94.
- Turning the Corner: Abstraction at the End of the Twentieth Century. New York: Bertha and Karl Lwubsdorf Art Gallery, Hunter College of the City University of New York, 1997.
- The Mind of the Beholder: History, Theory, and Criticism of Art. New York, 1998.
- "Light in Hellas: How German Classical Philology Engendered Gay Scholarship", in Same-Sex Desire and Love in Greco-Roman Antiquity and in the Classical Tradition of the West, ed. Beert C Verstraete and Vernon Provençal. London: Routledge, 2005. Simultaneously published in Journal of Homosexuality, vol. 49, nos. 3–4 (2005), pp. 341–356.
- Homolexis Glossary. 2008.
- "Sexuality", in The Encyclopedia of Libertarianism, ed. Ronald Hamowy. Thousand Oaks: SAGE Publications, Cato Institute, 2008.
- Change, Eros, Culture: A Memoir. New York: Lulu Publishers, 2014.
- The Homophobic Mind. New York: Lulu Publishers, 2014.

== General sources ==
- Malinowski, Sharon, ed. (1994). "Walter R. Dynes". Gay & lesbian literature. Gale Literature Resource Center. Vol. 1. Detroit: St. James Press. ISBN 978-1-55862-174-9.
