= Deborah Edel =

American activist, archivist, and psychologist

- Born: June 23, 1944 (age 82)
- Occupations: Activist, psychologist, and archivist
- Organization: Lesbian Herstory Archives
- Partner: Joan Nestle (former)
- Parents: Abraham Edel (father); May Mandelbaum Edel (mother)
- Relatives: Leon Edel (uncle)

Deborah Edel (born June 23, 1944) is an American activist, archivist, and psychologist. She is best known for co-founding the Lesbian Herstory Archives with Joan Nestle.

== Biography ==
Deborah Edel was born on June 23, 1944, to anthropologist May Mandelbaum Edel and philosopher Abraham Edel. She had one brother, Matthew, and after her mother's death in 1964, her father remarried philosopher Elizabeth Flower. Her uncle was writer and historian Leon Edel.

In the 1970s, Edel worked as a psychologist for children with learning disabilities at the Coney Island Hospital, and in 1985 began working at the Mary Macdowell Friends School in Brooklyn, New York.

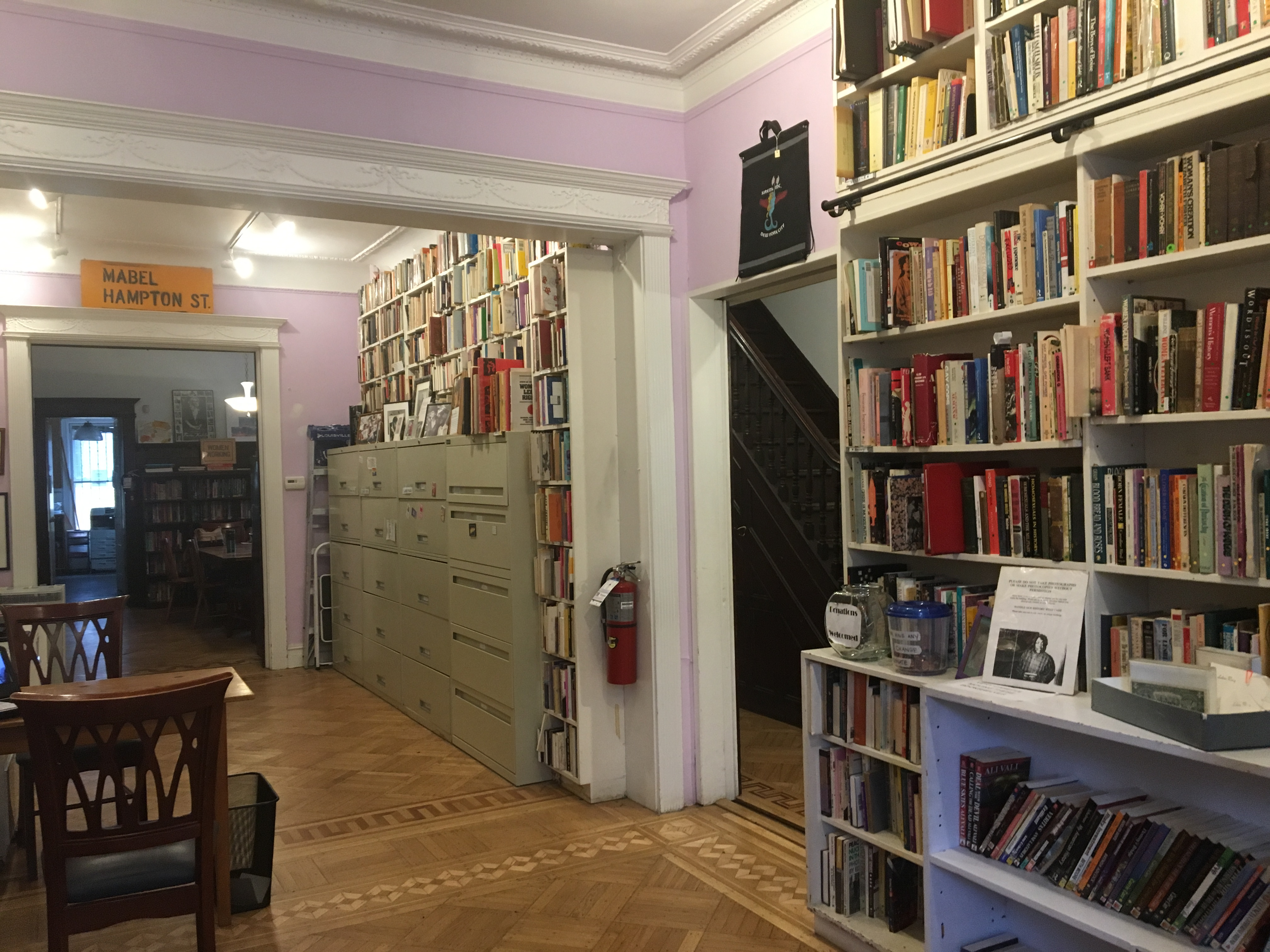
Interior of the Lesbian Herstory Archives.

In 1974, she and her then-partner, Joan Nestle, started the Lesbian Herstory Archives after being inspired by a women's consciousness-raising group of the Gay Academic Union. The collections of the archive were first housed in an apartment shared by Edel and Nestle on the Upper West Side, and along with Judith Schwartz, they served as the first official coordinators of the archive. The collection was moved to a brownstone in Park Slope in 1993 after it became too large for the apartment.

In the 1970s, Edel helped form a Lesbian Illness Support Group, inspired by consciousness-raising groups as well as a workshop by Audre Lorde and Lorde's partner Frances Clayton. She contributed a short piece about her mother's death and her experience with her partner's illness to a special edition of off our backs about women with disabilities. Edel and Nestle also gave a presentation on the Lesbian Herstory Archives at the controversial 1982 Barnard Conference on Sexuality.
