= Joan Nestle =

Lesbian writer (born 1940)

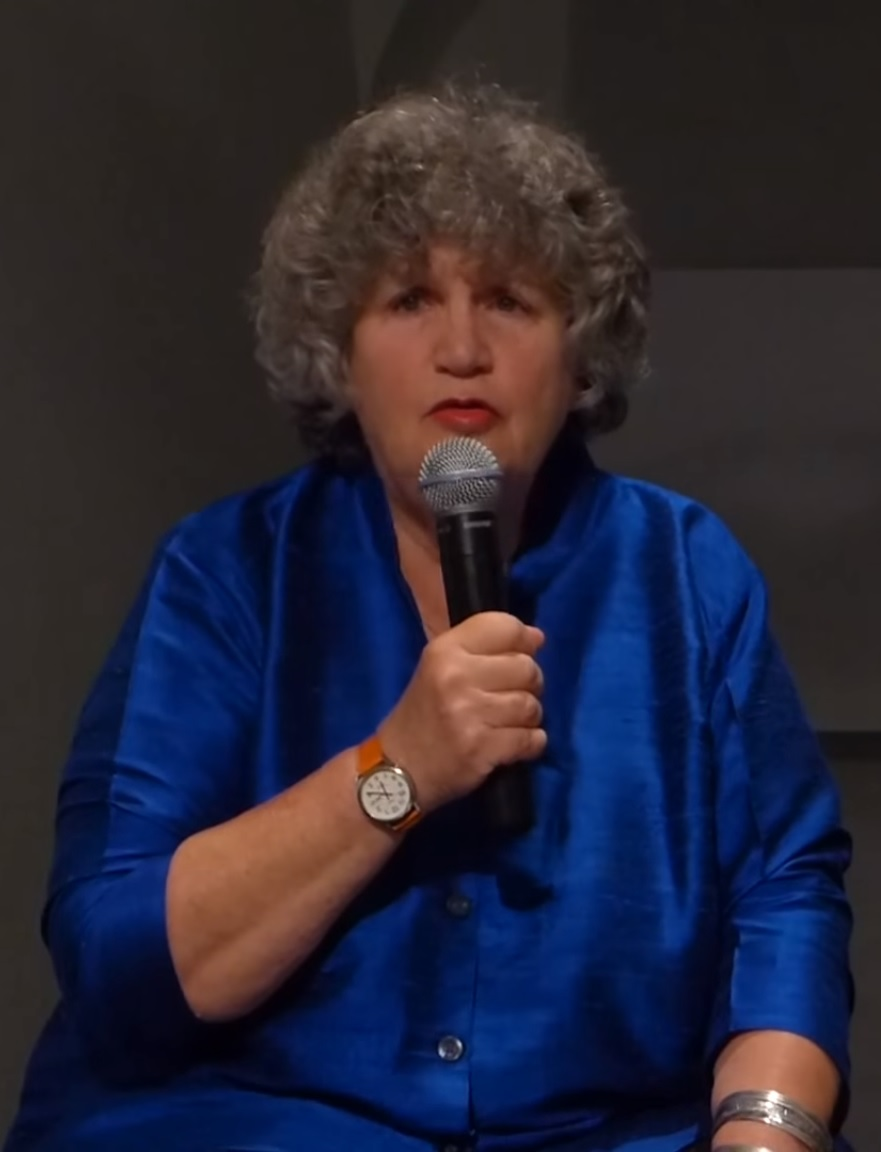
- Nestle speaking in Ljubljana, Slovenia in 2014
- Born: May 12, 1940 (age 86)
- Education: Queens College; New York University
- Occupations: Writer and editor
- Known for: Lesbian Herstory Archives
- Awards: Lambda Literary Awards; Bill Whitehead Award for Lifetime Achievement
- Website: joannestle.com

Joan Nestle (born May 12, 1940) is a Lambda Award-winning writer and editor and a founder of the Lesbian Herstory Archives. She is openly lesbian and sees her work of archival work as critical to her identity as "a woman, as a lesbian, and as a Jew."

== Life ==
Nestle's father died before she was born, and she was raised by her mother Regina Nestle, a bookkeeper in New York City's Garment District, whom she credits with inspiring her "belief in a woman's undeniable right to enjoy sex".

Nestle attended Martin Van Buren High School in Queens, New York City, and received her Bachelor of Arts from Queens College, City University of New York in 1963. During the mid-1960s she became involved in the civil rights movement, traveling to the Southern United States to join a Selma to Montgomery march and to participate in voter registration drives. She earned a master's degree in English from New York University in 1968 and worked toward a doctorate for two years, before returning to Queens College to teach.

Nestle was part of the butch and femme bar culture of New York City since the late 1950s. In an interview with Ripe Magazine, she recalled that the center of her social life as a young lesbian was a bar called the Sea Colony, which was run by organized crime and, in an attempt to avoid raids by the vice squad, allowed only one woman into the bathroom at a time.

After the Stonewall riots in 1969, gay liberation became a focus of her activism. She joined the Lesbian Liberation Committee in 1971 and helped found the Gay Academic Union (GAU) in 1972. The following year, she and other members of the GAU began to gather and preserve documents and artifacts related to lesbian history. This project became the Lesbian Herstory Archives, which opened in 1974 in the pantry of the apartment she shared with her then-partner Deborah Edel, and later with her friend Mabel Hampton. The archives now holds everything written by Nestle.

Nestle began writing fiction in 1978, when a prolonged illness prevented her from teaching for a year. Her erotica focusing on butch and femme relationships made her a controversial figure during the feminist sex wars of the 1980s; members of Women Against Pornography called for censorship of her stories. In her political writings, Nestle, a self-identified femme, argued that contemporary feminism, in rejecting butch and femme identities, was asking her to repress an important part of herself. She said she "wanted people, especially lesbians, to see that the butch-femme relationship isn't just some negative heterosexual aping." Her writings on the subject were highly influential; Lillian Faderman described her as the "midwife" to a revised view of butch and femme, and her 1992 anthology The Persistent Desire: A Femme-Butch Reader became a standard work in the field.

She retired from Queens College, City University of New York in 1995 due to an illness that was eventually identified as colorectal cancer. She was diagnosed with breast cancer in 2001. She now lives in Australia with her partner Dianne Otto, a law professor at the University of Melbourne, where Nestle also teaches.

In 1992, Nestle delivered the first Kessler Lecture for the CUNY Center for Lesbian and Gay Studies titled "I Lift My Eyes to the Hill": the Life of Mabel Hampton as Told by a White Woman. Her life was the subject of a 2002 documentary by Joyce Warshow entitled Hand on the Pulse, and she appears in the 1994 documentary about lesbian history Not Just Passing Through.

Nestle is a longtime patron of the Australian Queer Archives.

== Works ==
=== As writer ===
- A Fragile Union: New and Collected Writings (1998)
- A Restricted Country (1988)

=== As editor ===
- GENDERqUEER: Voices from Beyond the Binary (2002)—co-edited with Clare Howell and Riki Wilchins
- Best Lesbian Erotica 2000 (1999)—co-edited with Tristan Taormino
- The Vintage Book of International Lesbian Fiction (1999)—co-edited with Naomi Holoch
- Women on Women 3: An Anthology of Lesbian Short Fiction (1996)—co-edited with Naomi Holoch
- Sister and Brother: Lesbians and Gay Men Write about Their Lives Together (1994)—co-edited with John Preston
- Women on Women 2: An Anthology of Lesbian Short Fiction (1993)—co-edited with Naomi Holoch
- The Persistent Desire: A Femme-Butch Reader (1992)
- Women on Women 1: An Anthology of Lesbian Short Fiction (1990)—co-edited with Naomi Holoch
- Sinister Wisdom 94/Lesbians and Exile (2014)—co-edited with Yasmin Tambiah

== Awards ==
- 2015: Trailblazer Award from the Golden Crown Literary Society for Lifetime Achievement
- 2000: Lambda Literary Award for Best Lesbian & Gay Anthology—Fiction for The Vintage Book of International Lesbian Fiction
- 1999: Lambda Literary Award for Lesbian Studies for A Fragile Union
- 1997: Lambda Literary Award for Best Lesbian & Gay Anthology—Fiction for Women on Women 3
- 1996: Bill Whitehead Award for Lifetime Achievement
- 1994: Lambda Literary Award for Best Lesbian and Gay Anthology—Nonfiction for Sister and Brother
- 1992: Lambda Literary Award for Best Lesbian Anthology for The Persistent Desire
- 1990: Lambda Literary Award for Best Lesbian Anthology for Women on Women 1
- 1988: American Library Association Gay/Lesbian Book Award for A Restricted Country
