= Vincent Luizzi =

American philosopher (born 1948)

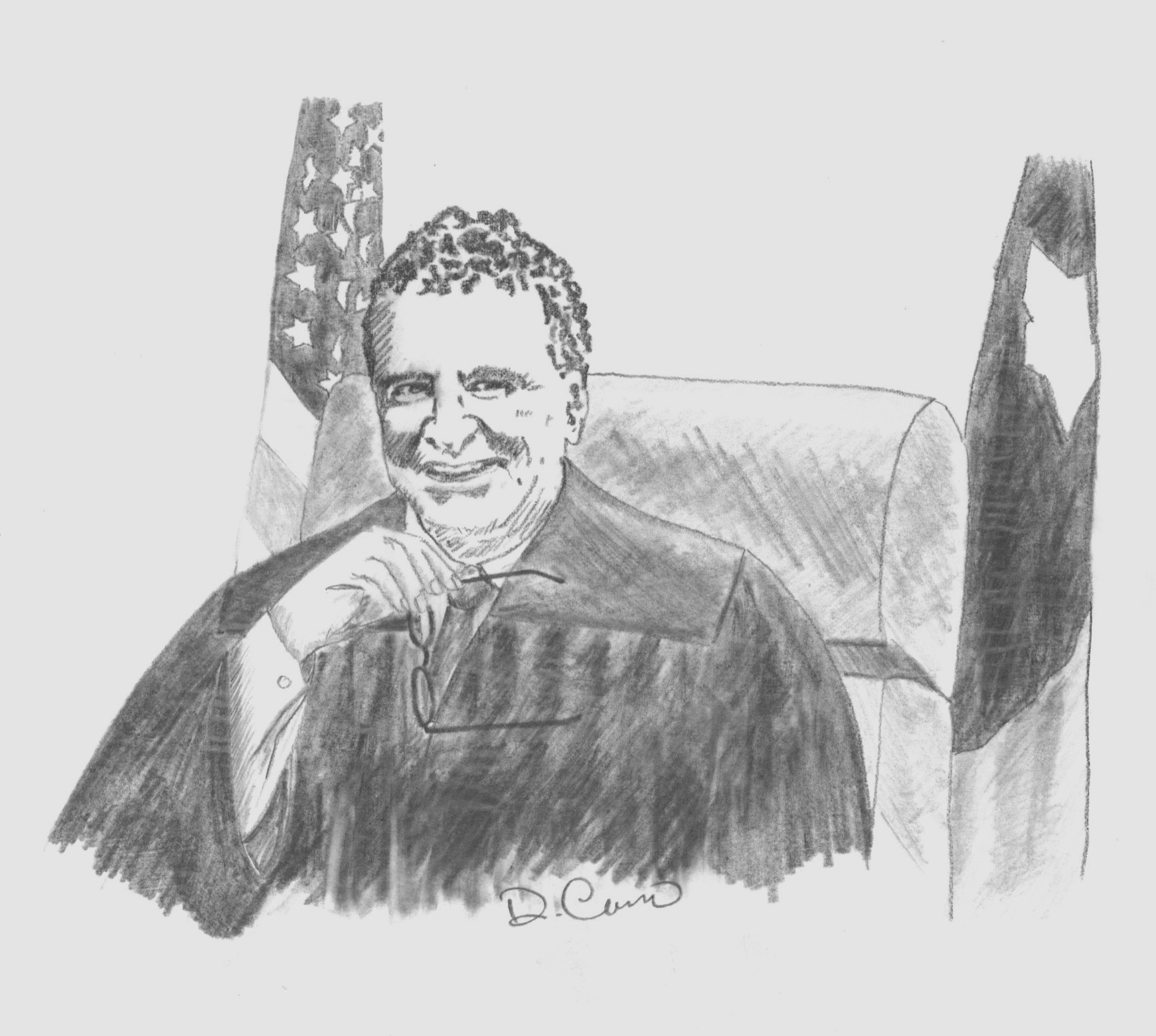
- Born: 1948 (age 77–78); Endicott, New York, U.S.
- Spouse: James Shew
- Awards: Fulbright Specialist in Law (South Africa and Bosnia), Special Award of International Society for Universalism, Phi Beta Kappa

Education
- Education: University of Rochester (A.B., 1970); University of Pennsylvania, (Ph.D., 1973); Boston University School of Law (J.D., 1976)
- Thesis: A Naturalistic Theory of Justice: A Critique of C. I. Lewis' Ethics (1973)
- Doctoral advisor: Elizabeth Flower

Philosophical work
- Era: Contemporary philosophy
- Region: Western philosophy
- School: Pragmatism
- Institutions: Texas State University
- Main interests: Philosophy of law, legal ethics
- Notable ideas: Legal ethics as a source for a universal ethic. People’s Courts as a guide for rethinking law, judging, and punishment.

Vincent Luizzi is an American philosopher and Distinguished Professor Emeritus at Texas State University (1976–2022). He is known for his expertise in legal ethics and philosophy of law. Luizzi was longtime Chair of Philosophy at Texas State University (1982-2014). A member of the State Bar of Texas, he served as a municipal judge in San Marcos, Texas and as a magistrate in and for the State of Texas, 1983-2018.

== Books ==
- Appeal to the People’s Court: Rethinking Law, Adjudication, and Punishment, Brill, 2018.
- New and Old World Philosophy, with Audrey McKinney, Prentice Hall, 2001
- A Case for Legal Ethics: Legal Ethics as a Source for a Universal Ethic, with a foreword by John R. Silber, State University of New York Press, 1993.
- A Naturalistic Theory of Justice: Critical Commentary and Readings on C.I. Lewis's Ethics, University Press of America, 1981.
