= Lambda Archives of San Diego =

- Lambda Archives logo
- Formation: 1987; 39 years ago
- Founder: Jess Jessop
- Type: 501(c)(3) nonprofit
- Location: 4545 Park Blvd., Suite 104, San Diego, California 92116
- Coordinates: 32°44′41.61″N 117°09′45.08″W
- Website: www.lambdaarchives.org
- Formerly called: Lesbian and Gay Archives of San Diego

Lambda Archives of San Diego is a community archive in San Diego, California. Its mission is to collect, preserve, and share the history of lesbian, gay, bisexual, transgender, and queer people in San Diego, Northern Baja California, and the Imperial County region. Lambda Archives preserves varied items including ephemera, manuscripts, event memorabilia, photographs, textiles, and more. As of 2019, the collections include approximately 100,000 photographs; about 13,000 of those are digitized.

In 1987, Jess Jessop incorporated the "Lesbian and Gay Archives of San Diego", which would eventually be renamed Lambda Archives of San Diego. The archives started with materials that Jessop and Doug Moore had collected through the years. As a 501(c)(3) nonprofit organization, the primary focus of Lambda Archives is to preserve LGBT history and culture in the San Diego–Tijuana region. Lambda Archives is located in the building owned and operated by Diversionary Theatre, the 3rd oldest LGBTQ+ theatre in the U.S.

In the middle of the COVID-19 pandemic in the summer of 2020, Lambda Archives was able to hire its first full-time archivist, but continues to be dependent on donors and volunteers, including its volunteer Board of Directors. On July 11, 2021, the San Diego Union-Tribune published a cover feature about Lambda Archives for its Sunday Edition Arts & Culture section titled "Pride and preservation: Lambda Archives safeguards San Diego's LGBTQ past."

== Larry T. Baza Memorial Scholarship ==
On October 5, 2021, Lambda Archives announced the Larry T. Baza Memorial Scholarship Fund. Larry was an advocate for LGBTQ+ rights, and for the arts and artists—especially BIPOC artists. He frequently called on LGBTQ+ youth to carry on the legacy of those who came before him. This scholarship has been created in his honor as a way to support youth/young adults in their path to seeking education and training. As the scholarship fund has been designed to benefit college students whose intersecting identities are reflective of Larry T. Baza, funding will be provided to students attending community college in San Diego or Imperial County of any or no gender who are both LGBTQ+ and either Chicano/x, Latinx, or Chamorro.

== Programs and exhibits ==
=== City Hall exhibit ===
In 2010, Lambda Archives co-sponsored the first ever LGBT historical exhibit in San Diego's City Hall titled, "A Celebration of San Diego LGBT History".

=== San Diego History Center exhibit ===
In 2018, Lambda Archives collaborated with the San Diego History Center to present an exhibit called "LGBTQ+ San Diego: Stories of Struggles and Triumphs". The exhibit, curated by Lillian Faderman, covered the history of LGBTQ people in San Diego and included a portion of the NAMES Project AIDS Memorial Quilt.

=== Annual Gala ===
In 2007, the archives began holding an annual gala to build additional support in the community and generating additional donations.

The 2008 Honorees were Cleve Jones and Christine Kehoe.

The 2011 Honorees were Larry Baza, Jennifer LeSar, Doug Case, Carol Pierce, Judi Schaim, Jeff Wynne, George Murphy, Gloria Johnson, Max Disposti, Stewart Bornhoft, Bill Beck, Sara Beth Brooks (Youth Award).

== Board of directors ==
Nicole Verdés (President) :: Mark Maddox (Vice President) :: Brianna Mirabile (Treasurer) :: Matthew Vasilakis (Secretary)

Isabel Cordova :: Anna Culbertson :: Gibrán Güido :: Lisa Lamont :: India Pierce :: Hank Ramírez :: Jae Red Rose
