= Gay Academic Union =

Former group of LGBT academic activists

The Gay Academic Union (GAU) was a group of LGBT academics who aimed at making academia more amenable to the LGBT community in the United States. It was formed in April 1973, held 4 yearly conferences (the last in November 1976) and conducted other scholarly activities. It disbanded around 1987.

== History ==
Members included Martin Duberman, Bertha Harris, Karla Jay, Jonathan Ned Katz, Barbara Gittings, John D'Emilio, Jonathan Dunn-Rankin, Joan Nestle, George Whitmore, Andrea Dworkin and Michael Lynch. They held their first conference on November 23 and 24, 1973, at John Jay College of Criminal Justice in New York City.

Martin Duberman has recalled that lesbians in the group were often discriminated against by white gay men, and he argued with George Whitmore about this. The Lesbian Herstory Archives were founded in 1974 by lesbian members of the Gay Academic Union who had organized a group to discuss sexism within that organization. Co-founders Joan Nestle, Deborah Edel, Sahli Cavallo, Pamela Oline and Julia Stanley wanted to ensure that the stories of the lesbian community were protected for future generations.

By 1975, many radicals had left the group and conferences were moved to Los Angeles, although Wayne R. Dynes and others stayed in New York. The 1976 conference, however, was held at Columbia University in New York City.

Jonathan Dunn-Rankin was the national president from 1981 to 1987 and traveled from city to city trying to organize all the chapters together.
