= David F. Greenberg =

American sociologist (1942–2024)

David F. Greenberg (1942-July 9, 2024) was an American criminologist, professor, and author.

Greenberg was born in Evanston, Illinois and earned his bachelor's, masters, and doctorate from University of Chicago, with a specialization in theoretical physics. In the late 1960s, Greenberg became involved in the peace and prison abolition movements. His personal experiences with anti-draft activism during the Vietnam War and brushes with illegality in his youth helped inspire an academic interest in the justice system and prison conditions. In addition to activism, he began writing for periodicals and academic books on these subjects. Through this writing, he was hired by the NYU Sociology Department in 1973. Beyond writing on issues of criminology, sociology of law, math, and human sexuality, he also published a translation of the Epic of Gilgamesh from Akkadian to English.

Greenberg supported the New American Movement and was a member of the Democratic Socialists of America until his death.

== Personal life ==
Greenberg lived in a rent-controlled apartment in the West Village neighborhood of Lower Manhattan, New York City. He never married or had children.

== Bibliography ==
- Crime and Capitalism: Readings in Marxist Criminology (1970)
- Corrections and Punishment (1977)
- The Construction of Homosexuality (1988)
- Age, Capitalism and Crime (2009)

== Awards ==
- Outstanding Scholarship Award , Criminology Section, American Sociological Association - 1983
- Elected Fellow, American Society of Criminology - 1994
