= Elizabeth Flower =

American philosopher

Elizabeth Farquhar Flower
- Born: 1914; Atlantic City, New Jersey, U.S.
- Died: June 26, 1995 (aged 80–81)

Education
- Education: University of Pennsylvania (Ph.D.)
- Academic advisor: Edgar A. Singer Jr.

Philosophical work
- Era: Contemporary philosophy
- Region: Western philosophy
- School: Analytic
- Institutions: University of Pennsylvania
- Doctoral students: Vincent Luizzi, Sidney Morgenbesser
- Main interests: Ethics, philosophy of law

Elizabeth Farquhar Flower (1914 – June 26, 1995) was an American philosopher and professor of philosophy at the University of Pennsylvania. She co-authored (with Murray G. Murphey) a standard textbook on the history of philosophy, History of Philosophy in America.

== Biography ==
Elizabeth Farquhar Flower was born in Atlantic City, New Jersey in 1914. Her father was a teacher and her mother a nurse.

At twenty-one she graduated from Wilson College with a degree in chemistry. Initially interested in medicine, she changed the focus of her studies and in 1939 received a PhD in philosophy from the University of Pennsylvania. Two years before graduating, she was appointed an assistant instructor, and eight years after graduating, she was appointed assistant professor of philosophy. She received tenure in 1956, and became a full professor in 1974. She was one of the earliest women to enter a career in teaching philosophy at universities in the United States.

She taught many students, the most prominent of whom was Martin Luther King Jr., who audited one of her early ethics seminars. Many of her articles were published in scientific journals, and in 1977, she published her most popular work History of Philosophy in America, and in 1994 she co-edited, Critique of Applied Ethics: Reflections and Recommendations. Flower also co-edited Morality, Philosophy and Practice in 1989 and was a coauthor of Principales De La Philosofia NordeAmericana She sporadically taught at Columbia (Barnard), Hamilton College, and foreign schools in Peru, Colombia, Chile and Argentina. Flower taught undergraduate ethics for many years at the University of Pennsylvania. She emphasized the impact of Scottish realism on the development of philosophy in America.

Outside of teaching philosophy, Flower was secretary of the eastern division of the American Philosophical Society, and she married philosopher Abraham Edel in 1973. She died on June 26, 1995, of cancer.

== Bibliography ==
- History of Philosophy in America
- Critique of Applied Ethics
- Morality, Philosophy and Practice
- Principales De La Philosofia NordeAmericana
