= The Age of Marriage in Ancient Rome =

2003 book

- Author: Arnold A. Lelis, William Armstrong Percy, Beert C. Verstraete
- Genre: Nonfiction
- Publisher: Edwin Mellen Press
- Publication date: 2003
- Pages: 168
- ISBN: 978-0773466654

The Age of Marriage in Ancient Rome is a 2003 classical history book by Arnold A. Lelis, William Armstrong Percy and Beert C. Verstraete.
