= Encyclopedia of Homosexuality =

First edition cover

The Encyclopedia of Homosexuality is a 1990 encyclopedic book about homosexuality edited by Wayne R. Dynes. It was published by Garland Publishing in New York City. The encyclopedia contains 770 articles.

It is written by many different experts and most of the articles are signed.

== Review ==
In 1995 the Encyclopedia was withdrawn by Garland, following accusations in The Chronicle of Higher Education that the editor Dynes had published articles under the pseudonym Evelyn Gettone. Dynes admitted that he had done so and apologized. Dynes subsequently said that this was due to "a pressure group of leftist and feminist activists who viewed the Encyclopedia as lacking in political correctness".

It was reviewed positively by Reference & User Services Quarterly.

It was listed on several "Best Books of the Year" lists.
