= Lesbian Herstory Archives =

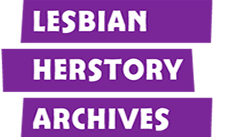
- Logo
- Established: 1974
- Location: 484 14th St. Park Slope, Brooklyn, New York 11215
- Coordinates: 40°39′42.79″N 73°58′49.2″W
- Type: Archive, history museum
- Public transit access: New York City Subway: 15th Street – Prospect Park ( trains); New York City Bus: B61, B67, B68, B69
- Website: lesbianherstoryarchives.org

New York City Landmark
- Designated: November 22, 2022
- Reference no.: 2662

The Lesbian Herstory Archives (LHA) is a New York City-based archive, community center, and museum dedicated to preserving lesbian history, located in Park Slope, Brooklyn. The Archives contain the world's largest collection of materials by and about lesbians.

The Archives were founded in 1974 by lesbian members of the Gay Academic Union who had organized a group to discuss sexism within that organization. Co-founders Joan Nestle, Deborah Edel, Sahli Cavallo, Pamela Oline, and Julia Penelope Stanley wanted to ensure that the stories of the lesbian community were protected for future generations. Until the 1990s, the Archives were housed in Nestle's Upper West Side, Manhattan apartment. The collection eventually outgrew the space and was moved to a brownstone that the group had purchased in Brooklyn's Park Slope neighborhood. The Archives hold all manner of historical artifacts relating to lesbians and lesbian organizations and have grown to include some 11,000 books and 1,300 periodical titles, as well as an unknown number of photographs. The people who work in the Lesbian Herstory Archives are often called "archivettes", which is a twist on the traditional term "archivist". There is also a documentary directed by Megan D. Rossman titled "The Archivettes" which tells the story of the Lesbian History Archives and its development.

In 2005, the LHA received the Michele Karlsberg Leadership Award from the Publishing Triangle.

== History ==
=== Foundation and early years ===
Following the Stonewall riots of 1969, many groups devoted to gay liberation were formed. Joan Nestle credits the creation of the Lesbian Herstory Archives to the Stonewall riots "and the courage that found its voice in the streets." The Gay Academic Union (GAU) was founded in 1973 by gay and lesbian academics interested in contributing to the movement. Lesbian members of the union started a consciousness raising group to discuss sexism within the GAU. The women were concerned with how easily lesbian "herstory"—history written from a feminist perspective—had been lost and did not want their story to be told from a patriarchal point of view. Joan Nestle later elaborated on the impetus for the Archives, writing "The roots of the Archives lie in the silent voices, the love letters destroyed, the pronouns changed, the diaries carefully edited, the pictures never taken, the euphemized distortions that patriarchy would let pass." The motto of the Lesbian Herstory Archives is "In memory of the voices we have lost." The original statement of purpose for the organization provided that the collection must never be bartered or sold, that it should be housed in a lesbian community space staffed by lesbians, and that all women should have access to it.

The founding members of the Lesbian Herstory Archives had backgrounds in lesbian feminism and political lesbianism and included Joan Nestle, Deborah Edel, Sahli Cavallo, Pamela Oline, and Julia Penelope Stanley. Lesbian activist Mabel Hampton, who had worked as a housecleaner for Nestle's family when Nestle was growing up, was also an early collaborator. The founders started gathering and preserving documents and artifacts related to lesbian history. They were interested in the social history of the community and collected all manner of materials related to lesbian history, regardless of whether the lesbian was famous or part of a marginalized group. Edel later related how they would joke that if an object was touched by a lesbian, they would collect it. The Archives debuted in 1974 and were housed in the pantry of an Upper West Side apartment belonging to Nestle. The location of the original archives was recognized as a Women's Rights Historic Site by the borough of Manhattan in 2008.

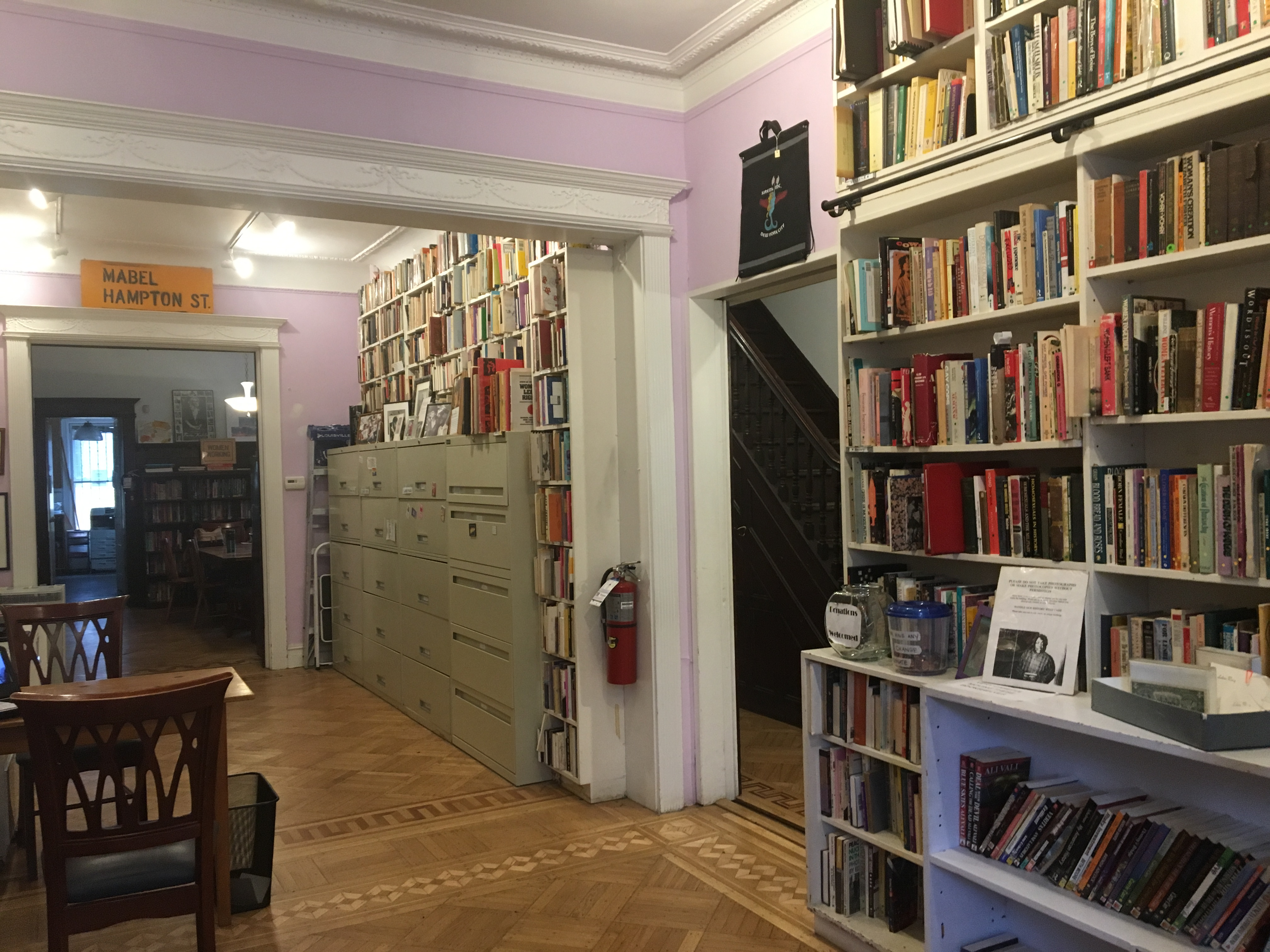
Interior of archives (2019)

The LHA began producing a newsletter, the Lesbian Herstory Archives News, in June 1975 and opened their archives to the community in 1976. In 1979, the LHA became one of the earliest queer non-profits in New York when they incorporated as the Lesbian Herstory Educational Foundation. The LHA's collection had grown to 200 special collections, 1,000 subject or organizational files, 1,400 periodical titles, 10,000 book titles, 12,000 photographs, and several thousand additional objects by 1990. According to Nestle, the collection had 50,000 objects by late 1992. With the LHA's collection expanding, the organization began raising $300,000 for a new location, mostly from small donors at events such as ping-pong tournaments, house parties, and barbecues.

=== Move to Park Slope ===
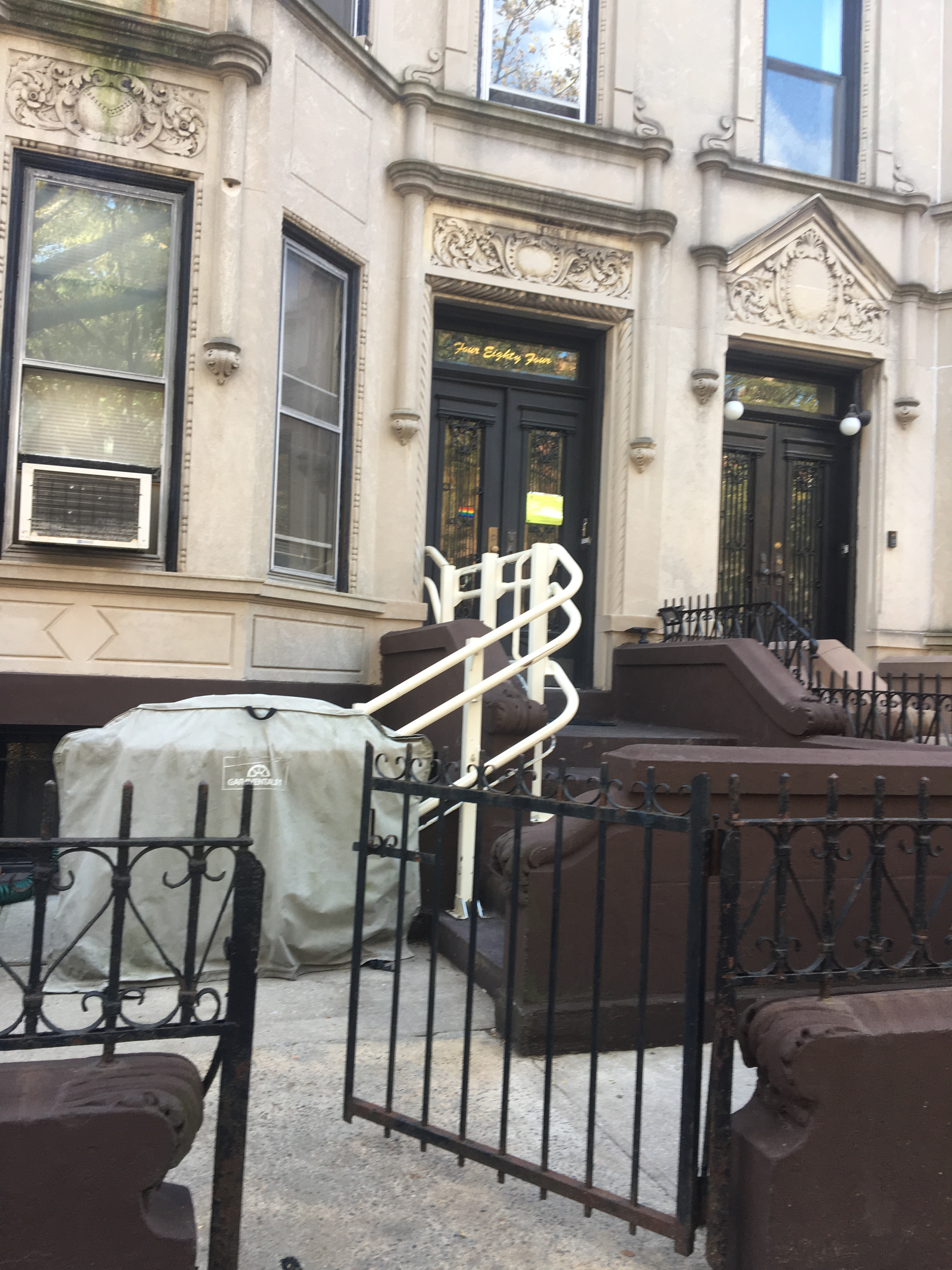
484 14th Street

After years of fundraising that began in 1985, the LHA purchased a three-story brownstone rowhouse at 484 14th Street in Park Slope in December 1991. The LHA hired lesbian carpenters and architects to convert the rowhouse into a headquarters for its collection. The Archives were relocated to their new home in 1992 and an official opening took place in June 1993. By 1995, the collection had 10,000 books, ranging from the 1785 book Ladies of Llangollen to mid-20th century "classic lesbian pulp fiction", as well as several hundred magazines. In addition, the LHA's newsletter had 6,000 subscribers. The 16th issue of the Lesbian Herstory Archives Newsletter from December 1996 announced that the mortgage for the building had been paid off.

In November 2022, the New York City Landmarks Preservation Commission designated the Lesbian Herstory Archives' building at 484 14th Street as an official city landmark. The building was the first city landmark in Brooklyn to be designated because of its importance to the LGBTQ+ community.

== Organization and exhibitions ==
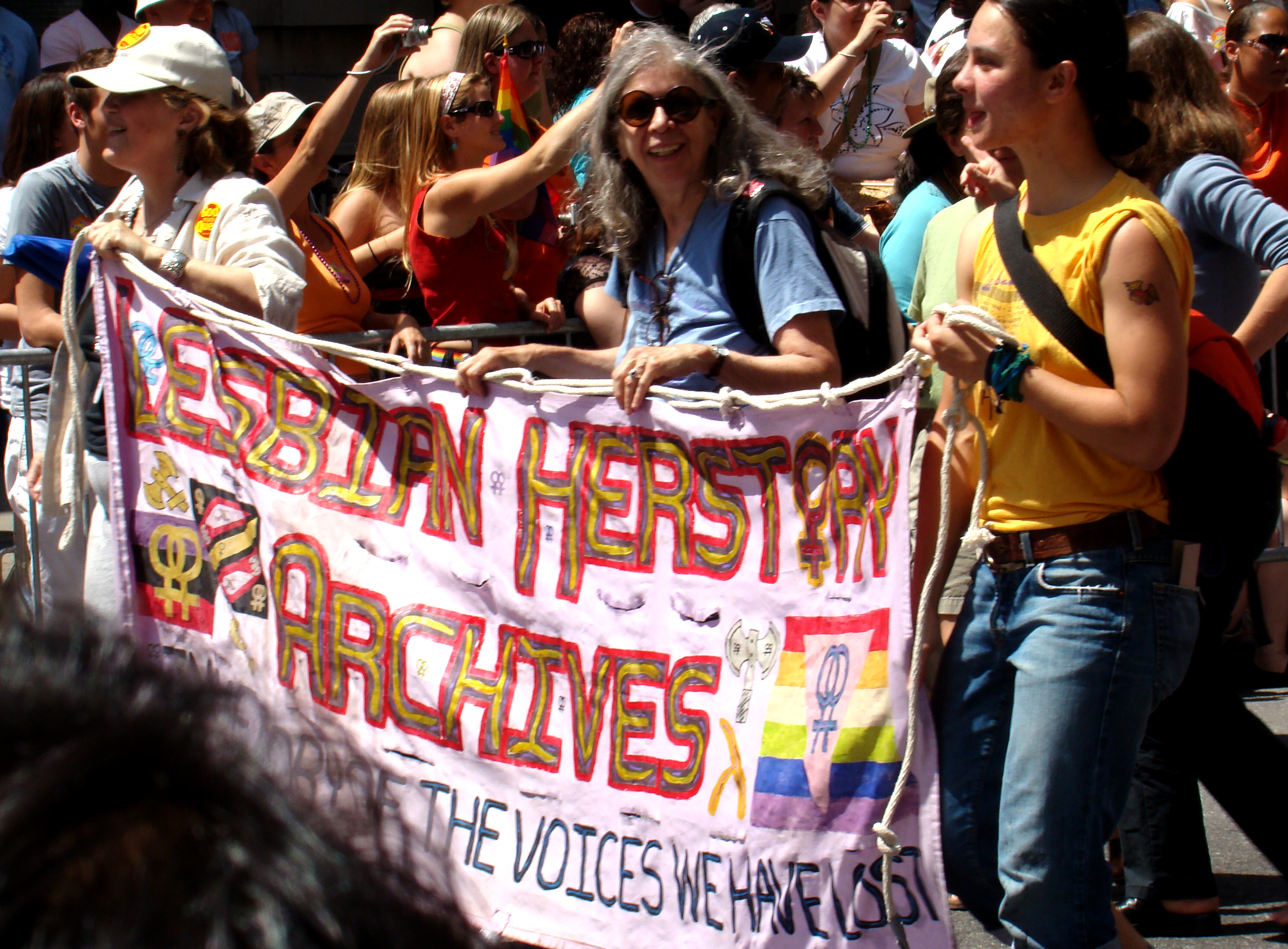
Women marching in the 2007 New York City LGBT Pride March hold a banner for the Lesbian Herstory Archives with the byline "In memory of the voices we have lost".

The Lesbian Herstory Archives are run by a coordinating committee who determine which items are accepted into the archives. The Archives are entirely staffed by volunteers and interns. The LHA hosts events in its space, including courses, speakers, marathon poetry readings, and an annual Valentine's Day event. Archivists from the LHA regularly march in the New York City Dyke March and until 2014 in the LGBT Pride March.

In the early years of the Lesbian Herstory Archives, samples of materials from the Archives were brought to speaking engagements. In order to preserve them, a traveling slide show was developed. LHA also sponsors traveling exhibits organized around various themes. Its "Keepin' On" exhibit features African American lesbians.

=== Collections ===
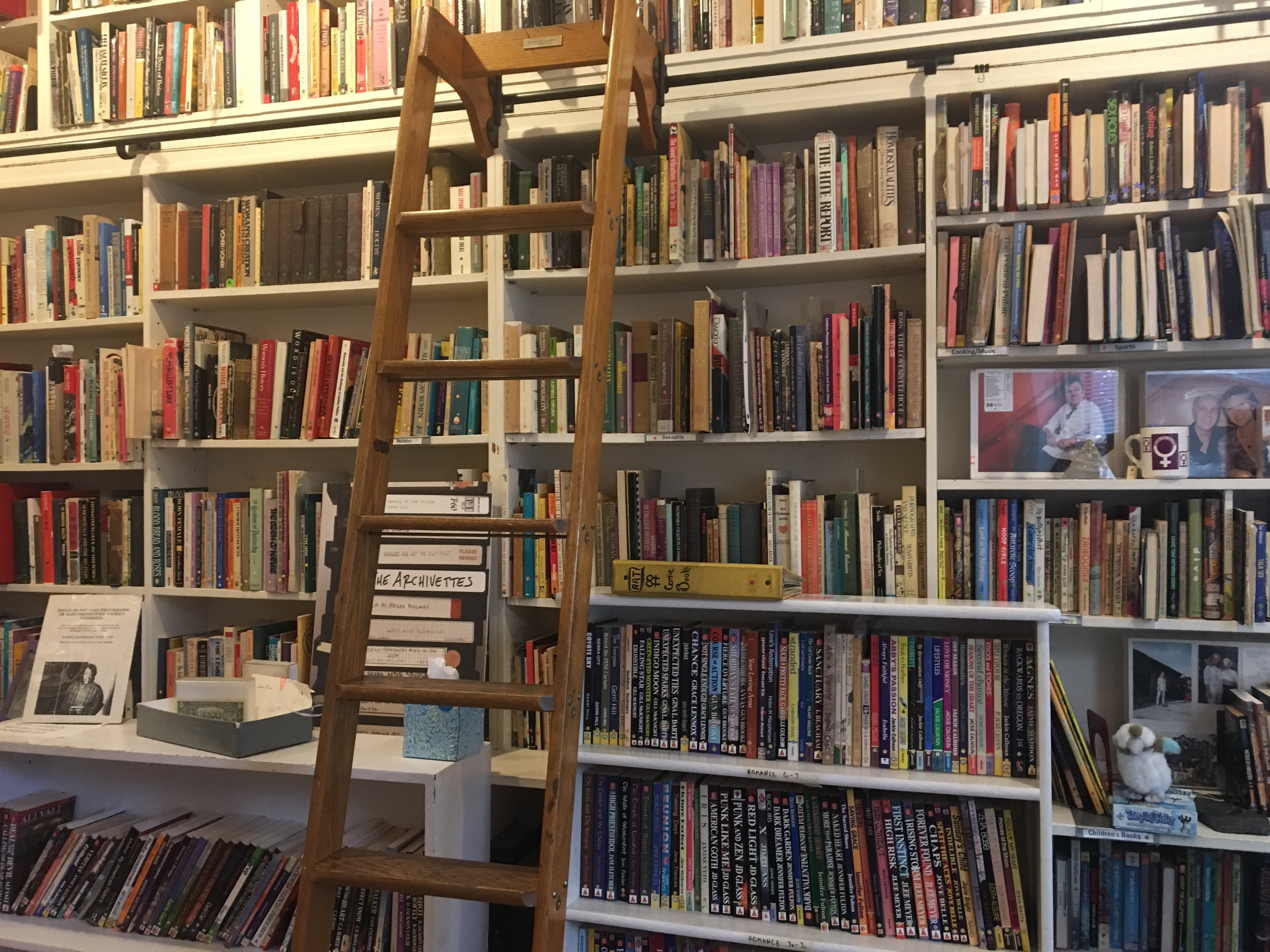
Bookshelves

The Lesbian Herstory Archives began with personal materials donated by the founders. It includes everything written by founder Joan Nestle. The founders also put out a call for donations of materials and gradually increased their collection over the years. When the LHA moved to 14th Street, visitors could view nearly the entire collection, except for a small number of artifacts that were kept private by their donors' request. Visitors were required to make appointments, could only view artifacts on-site, and were forbidden from taking pictures. The New York Times wrote in 1996 that "not even the archive's rarest possessions are kept under glass". Today the collection holds all manner of historical artifacts, including papers, diaries, journals, photographs, tapes, posters, buttons, periodicals, zines, T-shirts, and videos. Copies of films are available for viewing at the Archives and originals are stored off-site in a climate-controlled storage facility. Books are alphabetized according to authors' given names, rather than their surnames.

The LHA has accepted donations of materials for the Archives throughout its history. Mabel Hampton donated her extensive lesbian pulp fiction collection to the Archives in 1976. Files from both the New York Lesbian and Gay Historical Society and the Lesbian History Project were donated to the Archives upon the dissolution of those organizations. The Archives hosts the Red Dot Collection, which consists of the library of the New York City chapter of the Daughters of Bilitis, the first national lesbian organization in the United States. Writer and activist Audre Lorde donated some of her manuscripts and personal papers to the Archives. The Marge MacDonald Special Collection consists of the books, papers, and journals of Marge MacDonald, who left the materials to LHA in her will over the objection of her family, who wanted to destroy them. The L Word production donated their press materials in 2010.

The LHA website, which debuted in 1997, has evolved to include a digital collection featuring a virtual tour of the Archives. Since then, the LHA has digitized a large number of photographs, newsletters, and audiovisual media. The digital collection is hosted by the Pratt Institute School of Information. The LHA is in the process of digitizing its audio and newsprint collections and the video oral histories of the Daughters of Bilitis. The LHA maintains over 1500 subject files on various topics that they microfilmed with the help of Primary Source Microfilm into a set of 175 reels.

== Building ==
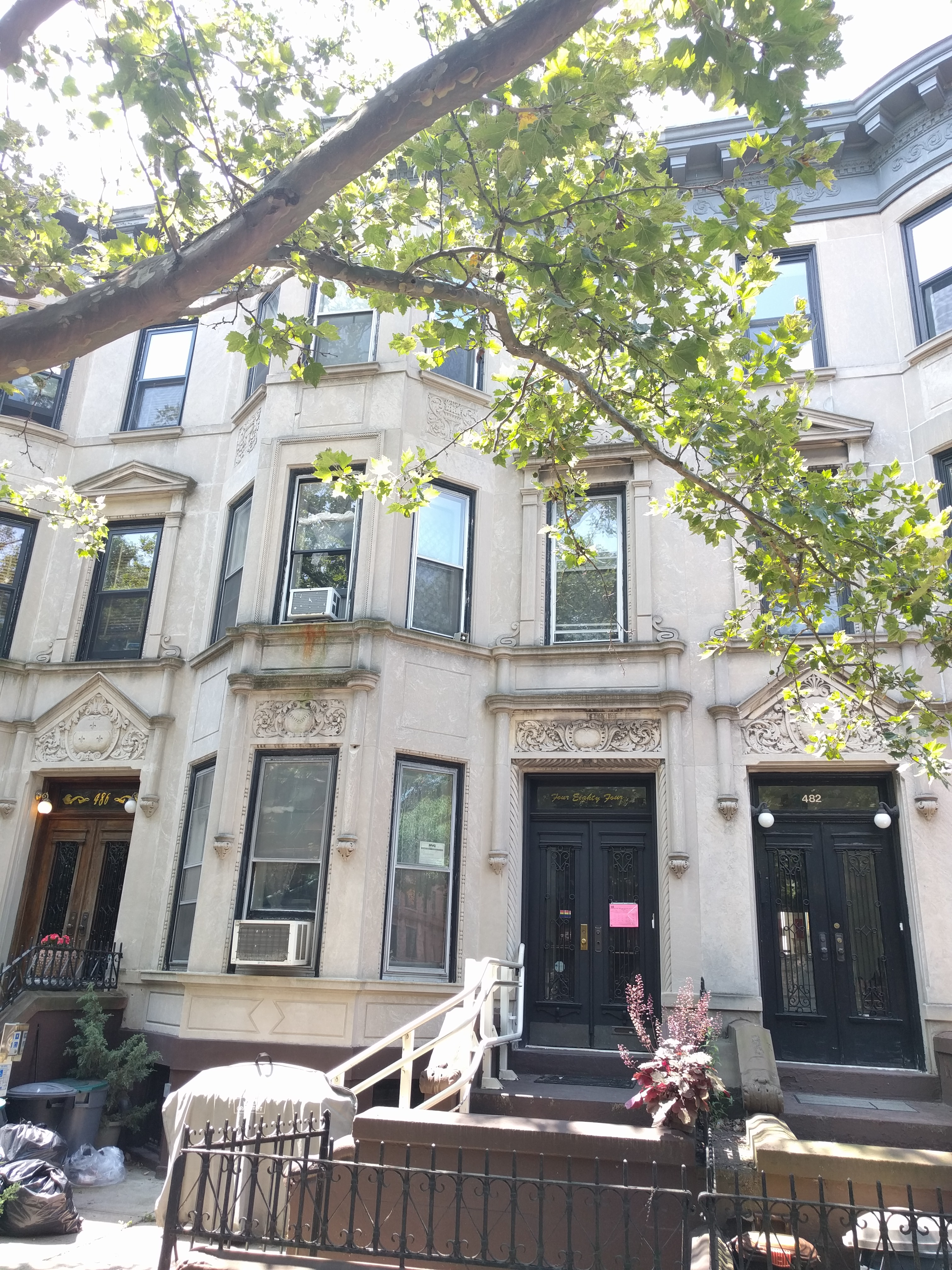
484 14th St

The LHA's headquarters is in a converted three-story rowhouse at 484 14th Street in the Park Slope neighborhood of Brooklyn. Axel Hedman designed the house in the Renaissance Revival style for the Prospect Park West Realty Company, which built the structure in 1908 along with six adjacent houses of similar design. The building was originally a two-family house; its first recorded owner was Matilda Levy, a German immigrant, who lived there with her sister. Levy occupied one apartment and rented the other to a metal salesman. Between 1921 and 1943, a Hungarian-American dentist owned the house; his family and a servant lived in one of the apartments, while the other unit was rented to tenants, such as an insurance salesman and two Danish hospital maids. This house was divided into three units in 1945 and was home to four families, including two of Syrian descent, by 1950. The LPC designated the house as part of the Park Slope Historic District in 1973, and the LHA has owned the building since December 1991.

The facade is primarily made of limestone, although the raised basement is made of brownstone. The house is accessed via an L-shaped stoop on the right, or western, side of the facade. The main entrance is through a double glass-and-wood door, above which is a rope molding and ornately carved lintel. The left (eastern) side is angled outward and is divided vertically into three bays. The first-story windows are surrounded by bead-and-barrel moldings, and there is an ornamental lintel above the center of the angled bays. At the second floor, there are geometric panels beneath a window sill that extends across the facade, Additionally, the rightmost second-floor window (above the entrance) contains an ornate surround and is topped by a pediment. There are elaborate carved panels above the second floor, as well as a simple window sill that connects the third-story windows. Above the third story is an elaborate metal cornice that contains a frieze, dentils, egg-and-dart moldings, and modillions.

After the LHA bought the building in 1991, the basement and first two above-ground floors were converted into display and storage space. The archives are mainly housed on the first floor, which contains custom-made shelves, offices, a kitchen, an event space, and a bathroom. There is also a wheelchair lift on the first floor. A caretaker's apartment is on the third story.

== See also ==
- GLBT Historical Society
- June L. Mazer Lesbian Archives
- Lesbian American history
- LGBT culture in New York City
- ONE National Gay & Lesbian Archives
- List of New York City Designated Landmarks in Brooklyn
