= Pat Walker (activist) =

African-American lesbian activist (1939–1999)

Pat Walker (February 18, 1939 – 1999) was a lesbian activist, poet, and businesswoman, best known for her involvement in the Daughters of Bilitis. She served as the president of the San Francisco chapter of the Daughters of Bilitis and helped create the Council on Religion and the Homosexual.

== Biography ==
Pat Walker was born on February 18, 1939, in Los Angeles, California. She was born partially blind and by her teens, had lost her vision completely. Walker realized she was a lesbian in her teens and had a supportive family; her mother had gay friends and discussed sexuality in The Well of Loneliness with her. After spending a year at an independent living center learning how to use a cane and other senses to navigate the world, Walker lived independently, refusing to use a seeing eye dog, and supported herself as a businesswoman, first by operating a telephone wake-up service then a convenience store in an Berkeley office building.

In 1958, she met Billye Talmadge at the Orientation Center for the Blind in Oakland, California, who introduced her to the Daughters of Bilitis. Walker accompanied Talmadge to DOB meetings and began working with her on The Ladder, a monthly magazine published by the organization. Her poetry was frequently published in The Ladder as well. In addition to working with the Daughters of Bilitis, Walker volunteered with San Francisco's Suicide Prevention Agency.

Walker became the president of the San Francisco chapter of the Daughters of Bilitis in 1960, after Jaye Bell was elected as the national president. Along with Cleo Bonner, she was one of the only African-American women involved in the Daughters of Bilitis. She was involved in organizing the DOB's first convention, titled "A Look at the Lesbian," and held at the Hotel Whitcomb. In 1964, she also represented the DOB at a retreat organized by the Glide Foundation in Mill Valley on "The Church and the Homosexual," which led to the creation of the Council on Religion and the Homosexual, the first organization to use the word "homosexual" in its name.

In her later years, Walker moved to a desert house near Lake Elsinore, bought after she inherited and sold property from her aunt. She said in a 1988 interview with the Lesbian Herstory Archives that she had no interest in joining other gay or women's liberation organizations due to the social rifts that came out of the politics of groups.

Walker died in hospice in 1999.
