= Charlotte Heth =

North American ethno-musicologist

Charlotte Anne Wilson Heth (born 1937) is a North American ethno-musicologist, a citizen of the Cherokee Nation. She is notable for her scholarship in and teaching of the traditional music, dance, and ceremonies of indigenous North Americans and for her publications and recordings in this field. She has worked to strengthen Native American studies for K–12 and has also curated exhibitions in museums such as the Smithsonian Institution and the Musical Instrument Museum of Phoenix. She was the director of UCLA's American Indian Studies Center. She set up the first American Indian Studies Master’s degree program and was the assistant director for public programs at the National Museum of the American Indian.

== Early life ==
Heth was born on 29 October, 1937 in Muskogee, Oklahoma, the daughter of Eula Jewel (Seabolt) Wilson and Woodrow Curt. She started learning the piano at age six. She went to Will Rogers High School in Tulsa Oklahoma, a school named after William Penn Adair Rogers, an American actor and a Cherokee citizen. Heth graduated in the class of 1955 and was inducted into their hall of fame in 2016.

== Education and career ==
Continuing her early interest in music, Heth directed several church youth choirs in Tulsa. She gained a Bachelor’s degree in 1959 with a minor in English and then a Master’s degree in music in 1960 from the University of Tulsa. From 1960, Heth worked as a teacher of English and music in New Mexico and Oklahoma before joining the Peace Corps to volunteer in Ethiopia in 1962 along with ethno-musicologist Cynthia Tse Kimberlin.

In 1964, she moved to Los Angeles County and taught Music and English for six years. Heth was interested in African music at that time. On searching however, she discovered that little had been published about Cherokee music. The few pages she found were about the music of North Carolina and published by Gertrude Prokosch Kurath. To rectify this regional lack of scholarship, Heth started field research in Oklahoma in 1971, gaining a PhD in Music (Ethno-musicology) from UCLA in 1975. In 1973, Heth set up a ten-week survey course on comparative American Indian music at UCLA. Over her time at UCLA, Heth was an assistant, associate, then full professor and professor emerita. She gave graduate seminars on Contemporary American Indian issues and Cultural World Views of Native America until she retired.

Heth was director of UCLA's American Indian Studies Center from 1977 to 1978 and of the American Indian Program at Cornell University Ithaca from 1987 to 1989. She was a panel member folk arts at the National Endowment for the Arts from 1980 to1982. From 1990 to 1992, Heth was chair of UCLA's Department of Ethnomusicology and Systematic Musicology. In the years 1993 to 1995, Heth was also president of the American Folklore Society (AFS), a sister organization of the Society for Ethnomusicology. Heth retired from UCLA in 1994 to become assistant director for public programs at the National Museum of the American Indian, Smithsonian Institution. She was also visiting curator at the Musical Instrument Museum in Phoenix. Heth was also invited as a visiting speaker and on summer appointments in music at universities including the University of Colorado.

== Selected publications ==
- The Stomp Dance Music of the Oklahoma Cherokee: A study of contemporary practice with special reference to the Illinois district council ground (Vols. I and II). University of California, Los Angeles ProQuest Dissertations & Theses. 1975.
- Sharing a Heritage: American Indian Arts, Edited by Charlotte Heth and Michael Swarm. Contemporary American Indian Issues Series, Number 5. Los Angeles: American Indian Studies Center, UCLA: 49–60. 1984.
- Issues for the Future of American Indian Studies: A Needs Assessment and Program Directory by Susan Guyette and Charlotte Heth. American Indian Studies Center. 1985. ISBN 9780935626292.
- Native American dance: Ceremonies and Social Traditions Edited by Charlotte Heth. 1992. Published in conjunction with an exhibition of the National Museum of the American Indian 1992 to 1993. Dance Books ISBN 978-1563730207.

=== Chapters ===
- "Overview", The Garland Encyclopedia of World Music. Volume 3. Edited by Ellen Koskoff pp. 366–373. 2000 Routledge
- "Seminole Music", The Grove Dictionary of American Music. 2nd ed. AmeriGrove. 2013 Ed. Charles Hiroshi Garrett.

=== Other ===
- Heth's publications are cited in the references lists of pages of The Grove Dictionary of American Music, for example those on Native American Flute, Weapon Dance, Gertrude Prokosch Kurath, Flute circle, Native American Hoop Dance, Indigenous music of North America and Seminole music.

== Selected recordings ==
Heth produced Songs and Dances of the Eastern Indians from Medicine Spring and Allegeny in 1985. She also produced Songs of Earth, Water, Fire and Sky. for New World Records.

Heth co-produced the 1994 Smithsonian Folkways album Creation’s Journey: Native American Music.

== Memberships ==
Heth was a member of the Western Social Science Association, National Indian Education Association, American Society of Ethnohistory, American Folklore Society, and the Society for Ethnomusicology.

== Awards ==
Heth received a postdoctoral fellowship from the Southern Fellowship Fund in 1978-1979, a Senior Postdoctoral fellowship, Newberry Library, Chicago, 1978-1979, a National Research Council award, 1984-1985. In December 2022, Heth received an American Folklore Society Lifetime Scholarly Achievement Award for her sustained work “examining and affirming the diversity of human creativity” and for “advocating for respect and mutual understanding of the world’s diverse cultures.”

== Legacy ==
Heth's nominator for the AFS Lifetime Scholarly Achievement Award stated that Heth has "enabled generations of scholars, as well as Native artists and community members, to appreciate the complexities and nuances of Native American music, dance, and cultural ceremonies. Her depth of understanding, and first-hand knowledge has informed her curated exhibits at the Smithsonian Institution and Musical Instrument Museum of Phoenix, and her leading role from 1994-1999 as Assistant Director for Public Programs at the National Museum of the American Indian."
