= Polk Street =

Street in San Francisco traveling northward from Market Street to Beach Street

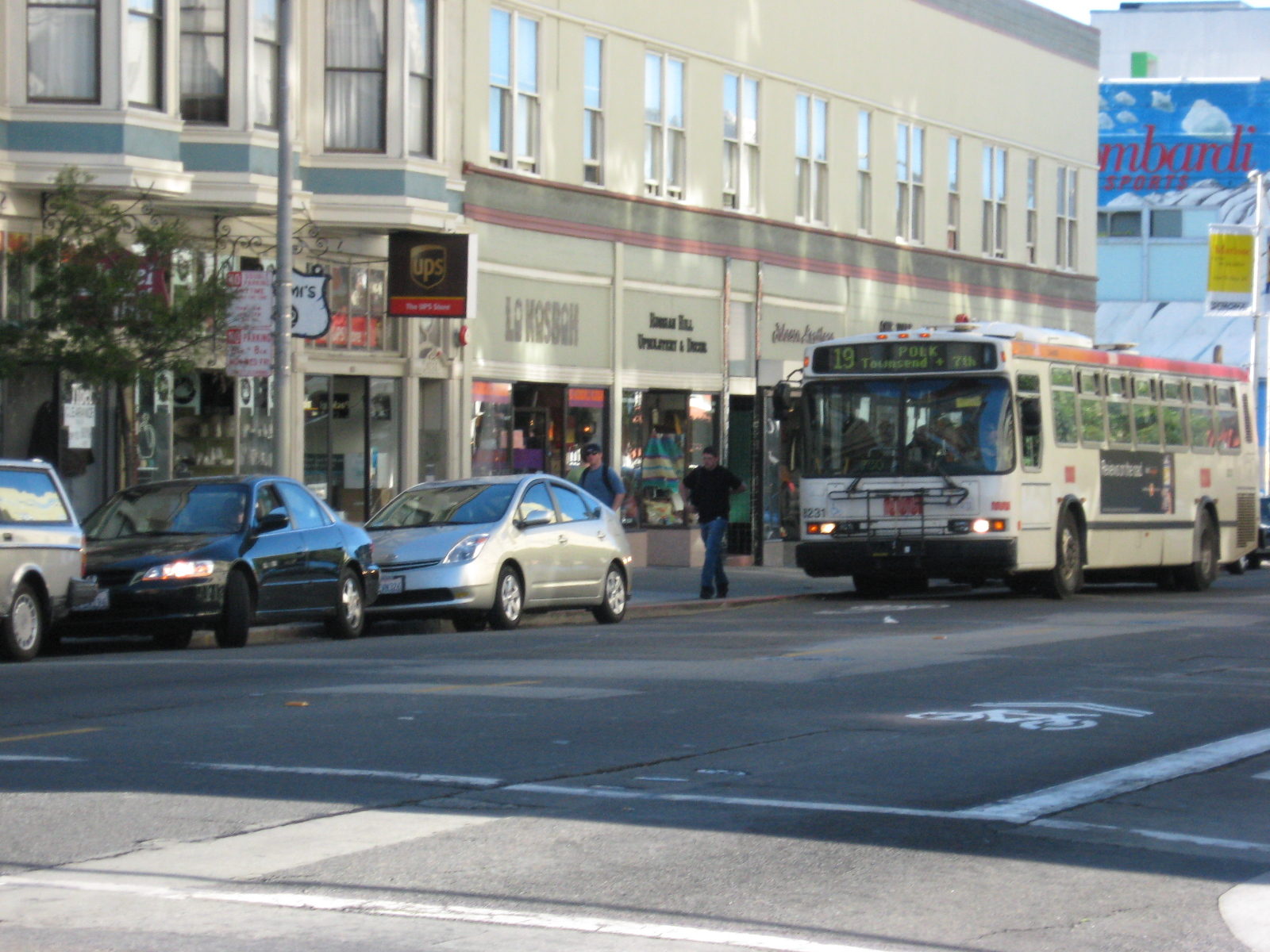
- A Neoplan bus on Polk Street operating on San Francisco Municipal Railway's (MUNI) 19-Polk Line
- Interactive map of Polk Street
- Namesake: US President James Polk
- Location: San Francisco, California
- South end: Market Street in SoMa
- North end: Beach Street at the Marina District

Polk Street is a street in San Francisco, California, that travels northward from Market Street to Beach Street and is one of the main thoroughfares of the Polk Gulch neighborhood traversing through the Tenderloin, Nob Hill, and Russian Hill neighborhoods. The street takes its name from former U.S. President James K. Polk.

The street also has bike lanes, which were approved in 2002. San Francisco bike route 25 runs along Polk Street, and is the only north–south route suitable for casual bicycle travel within at least a mile in either direction.

== Name ==
Polk Street is named for James Knox Polk (November 2, 1795 – June 15, 1849) the 11th President of the United States (1845–1849). During the Mexican–American War, and after the Texas annexation, Polk turned his attention to California, hoping to acquire the territory from Mexico before any European nation. The main interest was San Francisco Bay as an access point for trade with Asia.

The street was once referred to as Polkstrasse or Polk Strasse (German: "Straße" being the German word for "street"), dating back to the time when it was the main commercial street for San Francisco's German immigrants. In 1912, the German community built California Hall on the corner of Polk and Turk streets, a building resembling a German-style town hall (rathaus).

== Polk Gulch ==
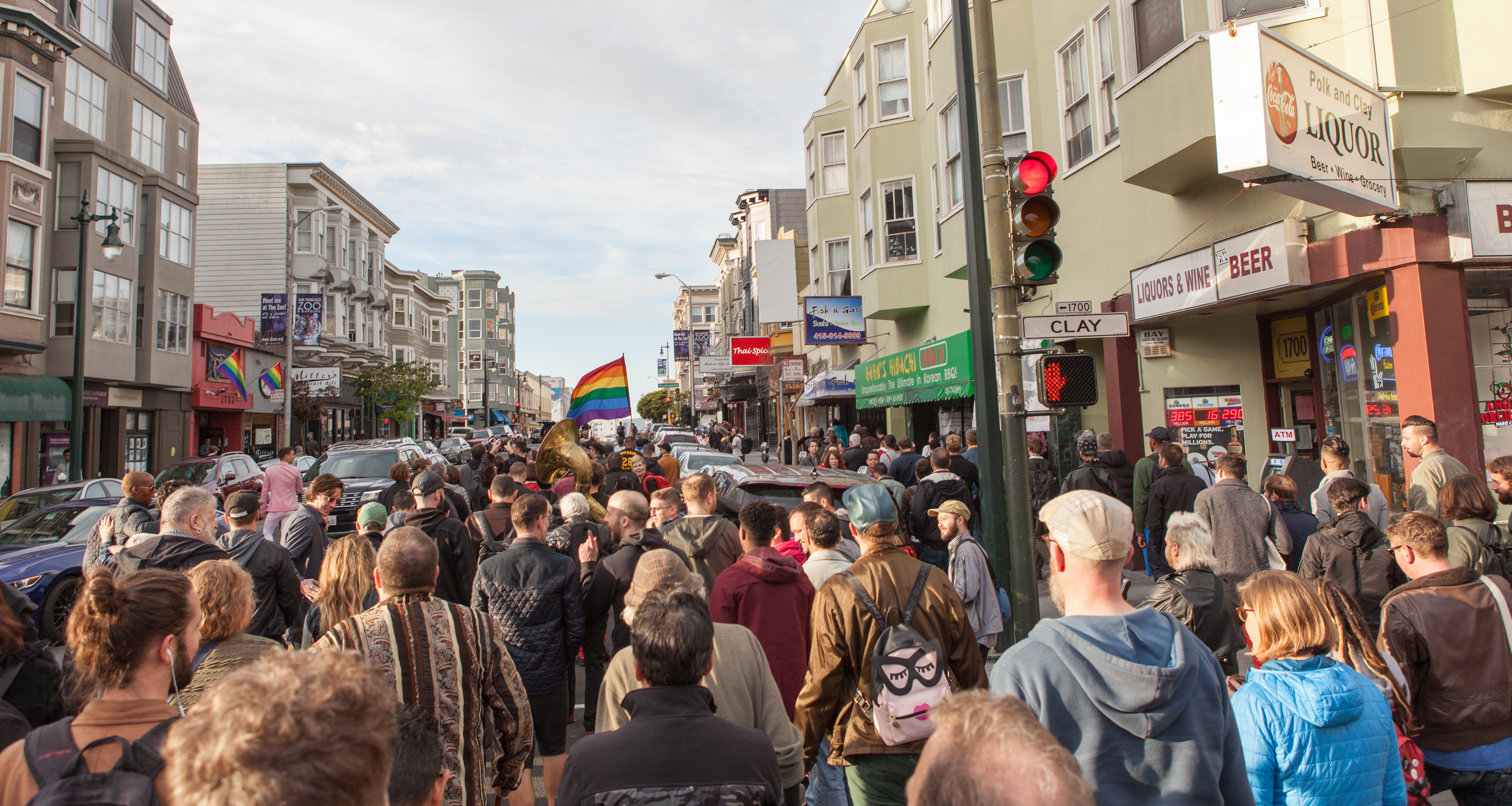
A crowd walks up Polk Street during the March to Remember and Reclaim Queer Space, March 2018.

Polk Gulch is the neighborhood around a section of Polk Street and its immediate vicinity, which runs through the Nob Hill and Russian Hill neighborhoods from approximately Geary Street to Union Street. The name, somewhat humorous, arises because the street runs over an old stream at the bottom of a gently sloped valley.

Polk Gulch was San Francisco's main gay neighborhood from the 1950s until the early 1980s, although around 1970 many gays began to move to The Castro (formally Eureka Valley) and SOMA because many large Victorian houses were available for low rent or could be purchased with low down payments. Only one gay bar, the Cinch, remains in the area.

As the original center of the city's LGBT community, it had remained one of the core centers along with The Castro and the South of Market (SOMA). On New Year's Day 1965, police raided a gay fundraising party for the newly founded Council on Religion and the Homosexual in California Hall at 625 Polk Street, an incident that, according to some, marked the beginning of a more formally organized gay rights movement in San Francisco.

By 1971, Polk Street was advertised as "one of the gayest streets in San Francisco". In 1972, Polk Street was the location of the first official San Francisco Gay Pride Parade. In the 1950s through the 1970s Halloween on Polk Street became a major attraction for tourists and locals. A migration from Polk Street to the Castro District happened in the 1970s for more affordable housing.

In the 1990s and 2000s the neighborhood started to gentrify. It remains prominent for its nightlife.

== Public transit ==
Sutter Street Railway established cable car service on Polk Street between Post and Pacific in 1883. Cable service was replaced with electric streetcars in 1907. The service was temporarily abandoned in the early 1940s before being reinstated during World War II, but finally replaced by buses in 1945. Tracks remained embedded in the roadway until at least 1948. The San Francisco Municipal Railway 19 Polk bus line is a remnant of the original cable railway.

== Other notable locations ==
The San Francisco Police Department Northern Station serves Polk Gulch. The street remains a busy business district with many restaurants, cafes, and numerous bars.

== McTeague ==
Frank Norris's 1899 novel McTeague is about a dentist whose office is on Polk Street. American silent psychological drama film Greed is written and directed by Erich von Stroheim and based on this book. In 2008, McTeague Saloon, located at 1237, opened, reportedly "inspired by the novel".
