= Herb Donaldson =

Herb Donaldson may refer to:

- Herb Donaldson (American football) (born 1985), American football running back
- Herb Donaldson (lawyer), LGBT civil rights advocate
