= Cynthia Tse Kimberlin =

American ethnomusicologist

- Born: Navajo Nation, Arizona, US

Cynthia Tse Kimberlin (born Cynthia Mei-Ling Tse; Chinese name: 謝美玲; pinyin: Xiè Měilíng; Cantonese: Tse^{6} Mei^{5}ling^{4}) is an American ethnomusicologist. She is the executive director and publisher of the Music Research Institute and MRI Press, based in Point Richmond, California. Her primary area of expertise is the music of Africa, in particular Ethiopia and Eritrea.

== Early life ==
Kimberlin was born on the Navajo Nation, in Ganado, Apache County, Arizona and grew up in the San Francisco Bay Area of Northern California. Traveling to Ethiopia, she was sent to the northern province of Eritrea, where she served as a Peace Corps volunteer from 1962 to 1964 along with Charlotte Heth. During this time she took it upon herself to conduct ethnomusicological fieldwork, although she had not yet received training in the field. She recorded many types of Eritrean and Ethiopian music (including songs of the Tigray-Tigrinya people), using a borrowed Philips reel-to-reel tape recorder with 3-inch reels. Many of these recordings are now of historical significance, as younger Tigray-Tigrinya people are largely unfamiliar with these songs.

== Education ==
She earned a B.A. degree in musicology from the University of California, Berkeley in 1962, directly after which she joined the Peace Corps, which had been founded a year earlier.

In 1968 she received a Master of Arts degree in ethnomusicology from the University of California, Los Angeles (UCLA), writing her thesis on the subject of contemporary Ethiopian popular songs. While there, her instructors included Mantle Hood, Klaus Wachsmann, Charles Seeger, David Morton, Tsun-yuen Lui, Nicolas Slonimsky, and Paul Chihara.

In 1972 she returned to Ethiopia for more extensive fieldwork, recording a total of 97 reel-to-reel tapes of music performed by musicians from Shewa, Wollo, Begemder, Gojjam, Tigray, Eritrea, Welega, and Gamu-Gofa, in Addis Ababa, Harar, and Jijiga. While there she also devoted intensive study to the masenqo, a traditional one-stringed bowed instrument. While in Addis Ababa, she spent six months as a Fulbright Professor at Addis Ababa University in the Theater Arts Department, which was at that time under the chairmanship of Tesfaye Gessesse.

In 1976, she received her Ph.D. in ethnomusicology from UCLA. For her Ph.D. dissertation, she focused on the theory and practice of qenet (mode) among masenqo players of the Amhara people of Ethiopia, which she recorded in and around Addis Ababa.

== Works, awards, and current position ==
In 1983 Kimberlin released an LP recording entitled Ethiopia: Three Chordophone Traditions, which included her field recordings of plucked and bowed string instruments of Ethiopia (begena, krar, and masenqo), along with her extensive liner notes. She also wrote the liner notes for The Music of Nigeria: Igbo Music (Bärenreiter Musicaphon, UNESCO Collection, 1983), an LP recording featuring the music of the Igbo ethnic group of Nigeria, where she has also conducted fieldwork. Music from her Three Chordophone Traditions LP was used in the 1999 documentary film Adwa, by Haile Gerima (who was a classmate of Kimberlin's at UCLA).

In addition to African musics, Kimberlin's scholarly interests include intercultural music after 1950, American music, African-East Asian reciprocities in music, ethno-biography, global issues relating to music change, and theoretical studies in music.

The Music Research Institute, of which Kimberlin serves as executive director, is a 501(c)(3) non-profit educational institution, which was founded in 1984 by Dr. Marcia A. Herndon, who served as executive director from 1984 to 1997). Kimberlin joined the Institute in 1986 and has served as executive director since 1997.

Kimberlin has taught at San Francisco State University, the University of California, Berkeley, Addis Ababa University (Ethiopia), and the University of Ife (now Obafemi Awolowo University, Nigeria).

Kimberlin has presented papers at numerous music conferences in the United States, Europe, Nigeria, Japan, and China, including many symposia organized by the ethnomusicologist and composer Akin Euba, whose opera Chaka has been released on CD by MRI Press.

She is the recipient of a Fulbright Dissertation Award, a Fulbright Teaching/Research Award, an American Council of Learned Societies grant, and a Beyond War Award recipient (for U.S. Peace Corps volunteers, 1987).

Kimberlin lives in Point Richmond, California with her husband Jerome. For many years she was affiliated with the Office of the President (Academic Affairs) at the University of California, Berkeley, and she also served as archivist for the Ethnomusicology Archive at UCLA.

== Selected publications ==
- Kimberlin, Cynthia Mei-Ling (1968). "Ethiopian Contemporary Popular Songs." M.A. thesis. Los Angeles: University of California, Los Angeles. Unpublished.
- Kimberlin, Cynthia Mei-Ling (1976). "Masinqo and the Nature of Qanat." Los Angeles, California: The University of California, Los Angeles.
- Kimberlin, Cynthia Tse, and Jerome Kimberlin (1984). "The Morphology of the Masinqo: Ethiopia's Bowed Spike Fiddle". In Selected reports in Ethnomusicology 5, pp. 249–61.
- Kimberlin, Cynthia Tse (1989). "Ornaments and Their Classification as a Determinant of Technical Ability and Musical Style." In African Musicology: Current Trends: A Festschrift Presented to J. H. Kwabena Nketia, ed. Jacqueline Cogdell Djedje and William G. Carter. Atlanta: Crossroads Press. Vol. 1, pp. 265–305.
- Kimberlin, Cynthia Tse (2000). "Women, Music, and 'Chains of the Mind': Eritrea and the Tigray Region of Ethiopia, 1972-93." In Music and Gender, ed. Pirkko Moisala and Beverley Diamond. Foreword by Ellen Koskoff. Urbana, Illinois: University of Illinois Press.
- "Orchestra Ethiopia 1963–1975: Halim El-Dabh, Catalyst for Music Innovation and Preservation" (2005). In Multiple Interpretations of Dynamics of Creativity and Knowledge in African Music Traditions: A Festschrift in Honor of Akin Euba on the Occasion of His 70th Birthday, ed. Bode Omojola and George Dor. Point Richmond, California: MRI Press. ISBN 0-9627473-7-8.

== Discography ==
- 1972: Ethiopia [West Germany]: Barenreiter Musicaphon. LP. Anthology of African Music series; vol. 3: Three Chordophone Traditions. Recorded in 1972 in Addis Ababa, Ethiopia by Cynthia Tse Kimberlin. Re-released on CD by Auvidis/UNESCO in 1996.
