= Billye Talmadge =

American lesbian activist and educator (1929–2018)

Billye Talmadge (December 7, 1929 – October 24, 2018), also known as Billie Tallmij, was a lesbian American activist and educator at the forefront of the burgeoning gay liberation movement in the 1950-60s as well as a founding member of the Daughters of Bilitis, the first organization established to fight explicitly for lesbian civil and political rights in the United States. Her main focus was empowering lesbian youth through education and counseling at a time when many homosexual and lesbian voices had been silenced by the current social and political climate.

== Early life ==
Billye Talmadge was born in Missouri, but raised in Oklahoma by her mother. She never knew her father and was always a self-described tomboy. She was the niece of Herman E. Talmadge, former U.S. Senator and Georgia Governor.

== Personal life ==
Talmadge first became aware that she was a lesbian at the age of 17 in her freshman year at a Kansas college, when she received a letter from a high school friend detailing her involvement with a girl. Shaken by the news, Talmadge sought answers from her dean of women, who gave her a reading list which included The Well of Loneliness, a book credited as an important step to self-acceptance by many other lesbians of the time and cited by Talmadge as her equivalent to the Bible. Talmadge described herself as being so absorbed in it that she read it twice in one weekend, describing it as "a coming home, a recognition, and a knowing". Once she had a name for it, Talmadge recognized that her sexuality influenced her social relations throughout her childhood.

At the same time, Talmadge found a particular distaste for Krafft-Ebing and similar literature popular at the time, which described homosexuality as biologically anomalous and perverse. Unable to find other published works to answer her questions, Talmadge turned to following another student rumored to be a lesbian on campus for a few days, before approaching her at a café just off campus. They drove to a park, where Talmadge asked her questions ranging from what being a lesbian meant to how to make love to a woman. This conversation became a milestone in Talmadge's life, credited for giving her an understanding of herself as well as a knowledge that there were others who had the same questions, and there needed to be people they could turn to for honest answers.

Following Talmadge's graduation in the late 1940s, her mother found out about her sexuality by chance after the mother found a letter in a school annual which Talmadge had written to a friend that was supposed to move to Seattle after her. Her mother blamed herself and the lack of a present male influence in Talmadge's life for her sexuality, but despite admitting to not understanding, continued to support Talmadge and any lovers or friends she brought home throughout her life. Talmadge stated that her close relationship with her mother made her lack a need for disclosure and acceptance which drove many other lesbians of her time.

Talmadge did not have her first relationship until two years after she began identifying as a lesbian, at which time she had finished college and taught her first year at a school. Her first relationship started in Seattle with Jaye "Shorty" Bell, with whom she then moved to San Francisco, where she discovered there was other literature available regarding lesbians and homosexuals.

In the early 1950s, a personal friend left out a piece of personal correspondence between herself and Talmadge which was discovered by the local postman. The letter contained information on both the women's sexualities and had been written on stationery identifying Talmadge's name and place of work, which the postman then used in an attempt to blackmail Talmadge's friend for sexual favors. Upon finding out about this, Talmadge grew angry and looked up the closest FBI office in the telephone book. The FBI office was closed when she arrived, but it was located directly above a post office, and Talmadge demanded to speak to the Oakland postmaster general. The postmaster general set up a meeting with the postal inspector, who questioned Talmadge on whether the contents of the letter could be construed as pornography. Talmadge denied this and stated when asked that it was a letter that the post inspector would feel comfortable letting his teenage daughter read if needed. The postal inspector got in contact with the Seattle authorities, who placed the postman under arrest for tampering with federal property and blackmail, both of which were tried as felonies. Talmadge cited this experience as a driving factor in her work in educating gay and lesbian youth in order to make them less vulnerable to both legal authorities and individual blackmail.

Talmadge spent twenty years with her long-time partner, Berkley professor and ethnomusicologist Marcia Herndon, who died in 1997.

== Professional life ==
Following her move to Seattle after she graduated from college in the late 1940s, Talmadge briefly worked in the acoustics divisions at Boeing Aircraft where her work required a high security clearance. She was followed by a national security agent as part of the investigation process for granting clearance for approximately three weeks. At the end of this period, the agent followed her into a gay bar on her way home from work and revealed that he had been investigating her and warning her that if he had told the company she was a lesbian, she would have been fired immediately. Talmadge obtained top security clearance just before she quit to follow her then-girlfriend, Jaye Bell, to San Francisco, California.

Talmadge held two PhDs in education and was foremost a teacher and educator. In the course of her career, she won the Golden Apple Award for her work with blind and deaf children. At the time, many state laws listed the suspicion of homosexuality as reasons for immediate termination from a teaching job. This led Talmadge to use the Welsh spelling of her name, Billie Tallmij, as a pseudonym in order to keep her identity and activism separate from her source of income.

== Activism ==
=== Daughters of Bilitis ===
Talmadge first learned about the Daughters of Bilitis in San Francisco when a friend invited her and her then-girlfriend to a house party at Del Martin and Phyllis Lyon's home. At this point, the Daughter of Bilitis (DOB) had been in existence as a social group meant to keep young lesbians out of gay bars, which were undergoing frequent police raids. Of the 8 women who had originally been part of the DOB, Martin and Lyon were the only remaining members when Talmadge attended the party. Discussion between the attendees of this house party transferred the focus of the DOB from a social group to an activist agenda.

In 1955, Talmadge helped write the Daughters of Bilitis statement of purpose, in which she focused primarily on popularizing education. Talmadge encouraged representation and racial diversity in the organization, which she noted to include not just African American members, but also Asians and Latinas. The political and social climate fostered a general fear of homosexuality, silencing of homosexual and lesbian voices, and a generation of young lesbians who did not know their rights in front of the law. Talmadge sought to educate young lesbians that it was not against criminal law to be a homosexual, as long as one was not caught performing what were then illegal sexual acts. The DOB continued efforts to create safe meeting spaces for lesbians, but also started efforts to educate both their own people and the general public.

Talmadge frequented gay bars and dives in both Seattle and California, some of which were called "toilets" owing to the state they were in. At the time, a California law was in effect stating that any establishment which sold liquor and catered to what was considered "pimps, prostitutes, addicts, and perverts" could have their licensing revoked and the patrons arrested. Police often used this law to arrest and hold patrons of gay bars. In a raid just outside San Francisco city limits during which 97 patrons were arrested, a woman sought legal aid from the Daughters of Bilitis. Talmadge and Del Martin called in legal representation and advised that all of the defendants plead not guilty and demand a jury trial. When brought into court, all defendants were accused of a violation which was not explained beyond its numerical code. All but four women pled guilty, were fined, and walked away with permanent records. The four women who pled not guilty had their cases dismissed, and later found out they had almost been charged with prostitution. Following this incident, Talmadge began efforts to educate lesbians to their legal and civil rights, and well as procedures and scripts to follow upon arrest and in the courts. These education efforts strove to eliminate disinformation about what individuals were required to give or tell to authorities and to make it harder for police to intimidate gay or lesbian defendants into pleading guilty for crimes they did not commit.

Though the lesbian separatist movement did not officially begin until the late 1960s, lesbians and gay men acted in large part independently of each other at the time. At the inception of the DOB, Talmadge and the other founding members had not even been aware that the San Francisco chapter of the Mattachine Society existed. Talmadge argued for open communication and the unification of lesbian and gay organizations. This proposition was often met with animosity from members in the early days of the DOB.

=== Gab n' Javas ===
Though she acted as a counselor for the community, Talmadge was at the time not professionally certified as such and worked to find a professional to counsel lesbians who had gone through traumatic situations. After the first attempt to put someone into contact with a professional psychiatrist resulted in him sexually assaulting the client, Talmadge became extremely wary of reaching out for help outside the community. Talmadge eventually connected with Dr. Blanche Baker, who began counseling incoming youth as well as training the officers of the DOB such as Talmadge regarding how to conduct group counseling. These group counseling and discussion sessions became known as Gab n’ Javas, which would often be held at Talmadge's home and would cover topics ranging from how and when lesbians should come out to feelings alienation from religious communities. The attendance for Gab n’ Java sessions could reach up to 70 women at a time, many having to seat themselves on the stairs for lack of any more available seating. These sessions were informal meetings serving coffee and cigarettes and fostering an environment of open exchange of similar experiences in order to build a sense of community. Talmadge was generally the moderator of these discussions.

=== Public education ===
Expanding education to the general public included lectures and talks to church groups or on the radio, as well as letters to editors in newspapers and publications, often under pseudonyms. At this time in the late 1950s, the DOB offices began to receive large amounts of letters both domestically and internationally bearing a wide range of reactions to their work. Only the officers of the organization had to publicize their first and last names, which led Talmadge to use the Welsh spelling of her name, Billie Tallmij, as a way of protecting her identity. Talmadge made several public appearances, notably traveling to speak in Estes Park, Colorado at their request, in order to help foster a better understanding between the local community and lesbian college students on a nearby campus. The Ladder, the DOB's newsletter bearing several of Talmadge's own writings, was widely quoted in the legal briefings leading to the Supreme Court One, Inc. v. Olesen decision that determined homosexual writings did not violate obscenity laws.

In 1960, Talmadge helped organize the Daughters of Bilitis National Convention in San Francisco. The convention was advertised in the Ladder, which contained certain rules of entry, including a mandatory dress code requiring skirts. Talmadge has been labeled an "accommodationist" due to her part in encouraging lesbians to wear clothing which did not make them easily identifiable. At the time, laws prohibiting people from appearing in public in apparel customarily worn by the opposite sex were in effect in certain areas of the United States.

Following the national convention, Talmadge became heavily involved in the formation of the Los Angeles chapter of the DOB. Talmadge invested a significant amount of time and personal income into fostering growth in the DOB, taking the title of Vice President in 1958. Talmadge phased out of activity with the Daughter of Bilitis in 1965 as it became more focused on political ideology rather than helping individuals. Following her affiliation with the DOB, Talmadge pursued more counseling training with another group of homosexual activists. She continued trying to educate gay and lesbian youth to find the humor in terrible situations, believing that laughter was often the best way to combat trauma.

Talmadge became a personal friend of Dr. Evelyn Hooker, one of the pioneers of studies on homosexual men which argued that homosexuality was not a mental disorder. Talmadge could not get Dr. Hooker to perform similar studies on lesbians due to how the connotations of a woman studying homosexual women would impact Hooker's professional reputation and the validity of her previous work. Instead, Talmadge worked to coordinate and participate in the first Kinsey Institute studies on lesbians.

=== Council on Religion and the Homosexual ===
In the early 1960s, Talmadge and the other officers of the DOB conducted a survey regarding the religious standings of their membership. This survey found that many, like Talmadge herself, continued to be religious but had stopped attending church services after they began identifying as lesbians. They found it was particularly hard for Mormon women to reconcile their identities with their religion. Talmadge began reaching out in search of ministers that would work with and welcome lesbians into their churches, but found very few willing to do so. Talmadge and other members of the DOB began writing scathing letters challenging these beliefs and urging ministers to come speak with them in order at attempt resolving the gap between religion and homosexuality.

This led to the organizing of the Mill Valley Conference from May 31 to June 2, 1964, in which 17 gay men and 4 gay women, of which Talmadge was the spokesperson, spent three days in a Methodist church with a collection of ministers in order to facilitate discussion. Talmadge spoke last, asking questions such as where lesbians were mentioned in the Bible. Following group discussion sessions, the ministers were taken on a tour of the local gay bars and told that because lesbians and gay men could not meet out in the open, they were forced to frequent these bars. Many ministers left admitting they felt unqualified to speak on the subject of homosexuality. Out of the three-day conference came the formation of the Council on Religion and the Homosexual.

== Publications ==
Talmadge's poems and musings were compiled and published by her longtime friend and caregiver Suzanne Deakins in the book Beyond The Mist by Billye G Talmadge. Her interviews are transcribed in Making history : the struggle for gay and lesbian equal rights, 1945-1990 : an oral history by Eric Marcus, and video recorded in the Lesbian Herstory Archives Audio Visual Collections under the Daughters of Bilitis Video Project. While Talmadge was not heavily involved with the Ladder, she has published several articles in it under the name Billie Tallmij, written during her time with the DOB.
