= Evander Smith =

American lawyer

- Occupations: Lawyer, activist

Evander Smith was an openly gay San Francisco lawyer who gained national attention for his efforts to legally block San Francisco police from harassing attendees of a fund-raising ball held by the Council on Religion and the Homosexual, an early homophile organization, on January 1, 1965.

== Police harassment at California Hall ==
On the eve of January 1, 1965, several homophile organizations in San Francisco, California - including the Council on Religion and the Homosexual, the Society for Individual Rights, the Daughters of Bilitis, and the Mattachine Society - held a fund-raising ball for their mutual benefit at the California Hall. Prior to the ball, several of the ministers from the Council on Religion and the Homosexual met with the San Francisco police, who tried to get them to cancel it. The clergy members declined to cancel the event, and the San Francisco police agreed not to interfere. However, on the evening of the ball, the police showed up in force and surrounded the California Hall and focused numerous kleig lights on the entrance to the hall. As each of the 600 plus persons entering the ball approached the entrance, the police took their photographs. A number of police vans were parked in plain view near the entrance to the ball.

Evander Smith, a lawyer for the groups organizing the ball, and Herb Donaldson, another openly gay lawyer, tried to stop the police from conducting the fourth "inspection" of the evening; both were arrested, along with two heterosexual lawyers - Elliott Leighton and Nancy May - who were supporting the rights of the participants to gather at the ball.

On January 2, 1965, ministers associated with the Council on Religion and the Homosexual held a news conference in protest of Smith, Donaldson, and the other two lawyers arrest as well as the police harassment that they ball attendees had been subjected to. Twenty-five of the most prominent lawyers in San Francisco joined the defense team for the four lawyers, and the judge directed the jury to find the four not-guilty before the defense had even had a chance to begin their argumentation when the case came to court.

This event has been called the "San Francisco's Stonewall" by some historians; The participation of such prominent litigators in the defense of the Smith, Donaldson, and the other two lawyers marked a turning point in gay rights on the West Coast of the United States.

== Anti-war efforts ==
Smith went on to protest the Vietnam War and was one of a group of signatories to a full-page ad calling on the San Francisco City Council to pass a resolution calling for an end to the war.

== Legacy ==
Season 2, episode 9 of the podcast “Making Gay History” is about Smith and Herb Donaldson.
