= Ruth Simpson (activist) =

American lesbian writer (1926–2008)

Ruth Simpson, c. 1971

Ruth Simpson (March 15, 1926 – May 8, 2008) was the founder of the United States' first lesbian community center, an author, and former president of Daughters of Bilitis, New York.

Her book, From the Closet to the Courts was published in 1977 and republished in 2007. She also produced the weekly hour-long program "Minority Report" in Woodstock, New York from 1982 until her death in 2008.

== Her work ==
As president of the New York chapter of Daughters of Bilitis (DOB), Simpson organized gay rights demonstrations and educational programs for DOB members during the period 1969–71. Several times when NYC police, without warrants, illegally entered DOB's lesbian center in lower Manhattan, Simpson stood between the police and the DOB women. On three occasions she was cited for court appearances by the police. She was also arrested at a Women Against Richard Nixon (WARN) rally, along with Ellen Povill, Ti-Grace Atkinson and Flo Kennedy, and spent most of a day in jail until the women's attorney gained their release.

In Ruth Simpson's 1976 pioneering work From the Closet to the Courts she documented her history in the early days of the gay movement and the actions taken to achieve justice, civil rights and equal treatment under the law for the large, diverse LGBT population.

Ruth produced a weekly, hour-long television program, "Minority Report", in Woodstock, New York. She served as the board president of the Woodstock Public Library from 1982 to 2001 and continued as an Officer until her death. Ruth has had her poetry published in literary magazines, and she has given a number of talks on college campuses in the Hudson Valley area.

== Biography ==
=== Early years ===
Ruth Simpson—born and raised in Cleveland, Ohio—was the daughter of Ethel and Edward Simpson, pioneers in the labor movement. In the mid-1930s through the early 1940s Ruth's parents organized a UAW, AFL-CIO Union (Local 88) and with only $14 in the treasury, called a strike against the Willard Storage Battery Company, the first factory to be struck because of health hazards in the workplace. The strike was successful and the company was compelled to install ventilation devices over lead burning and lead grinding stations where workers had suffered, and some died, from lead poisoning.

Ethel Simpson had researched the symptoms of Local 88 workers at the Cleveland Public Library while her daughter chose books for the week. It was Ethel Simpson's research that established it was indeed lead poisoning—a little-known disease at the time—that caused the workers' illness. The company doctor had for years diagnosed symptoms as "flu" and, when workers became partially paralyzed, as "dropsy" in order that the Willard Company could avoid paying Workmen's Compensation.

One summer day in 1938, a sympathy strike was called by the workers in Cleveland plants that surrounded Fisher Body's factory, and the families of union members came out to join Fisher Body workers' picket line (the union was having problems attaining collective bargaining rights). Ruth Simpson, 12 years old at the time, says that was the day she learned about the dangers activists faced. Police, both mounted and foot patrol, attacked the peaceful picketers with nightsticks and tear gas. Ruth saw her father, as he raced to help a man with a bloody head, chased by two police. One of them threw a tear gas bomb that hit the heel of her father's shoe, and he went up in a cloud of toxic smoke. Another cop chased Ruth and her mother up a driveway that had a high wall blocking any exit. They, too, learned the smell and pain of tear gas. Ruth says she vividly remembers the sound of wood on bone as heads were beaten and, more importantly, the deep pride for her parents and for the labor movement.

In her early years, Ruth Simpson learned organizational skills, as well as the importance of activism against injustice, from the legacy left by her parents.

=== Later years ===
Ruth and her partner of 37 years, Ellen Povill, met at DOB and bought their home in Woodstock in 1976. They immediately became active in their new community—Ellen as a videographer documenting local cultural events and programming them on public-access television cable TV. Ruth helped organize Woodstock's first gay group and launched a human rights ordinance drive in the town. After collecting and handing hundreds of signed petitions to town officials, Ruth was told that the town board had decided there would be a public debate in town hall between Ruth and the town's fire-breathing fundamentalist preacher, on Valentine's Day. Ruth reported that the townspeople thought she won the debate hands down. But the town board ultimately decided that Woodstock was already liberal and as such did not need such an ordinance.

Ruth became a library trustee and was asked to teach Woodstock's seniors' writing workshop about two years after she and Ellen arrived in Woodstock. Ellen is still documenting area events for local access and donating tapes to the Library's archives.

== Death ==
Ruth Simpson died on May 8, 2008.

== Bibliography ==
- Ruth Simpson, From the Closet to the Courts (Washington, DC: Take Root Media, 2007) ISBN 978-0-9800590-0-7
- Kay Tobin, The Gay Crusaders (New York: Paperback Library, 1972)
