= Marcia Herndon =

American ethnomusicologist

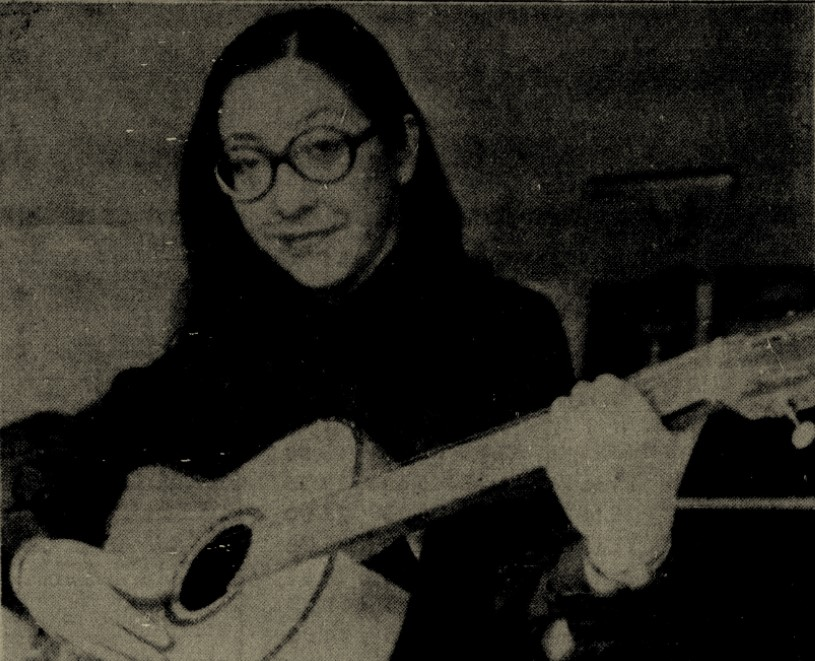
- Herndon in 1975
- Born: Marcia Alice Herndon; October 1, 1941; Canton, North Carolina, U.S.
- Died: May 19, 1997 (aged 55); Hyattsville, Maryland, U.S.
- Parent(s): George Everett Herndon and Harline Simmons Herndon

Academic background
- Education: Tulane University, BA, MA, PhD

Academic work
- Discipline: anthropologist, ethnomusicologist
- Institutions: University of Texas at Austin; University of California, Berkeley; and University of Maryland, College Park

Marcia Alice Herndon (October 1, 1941 – May 19, 1997) was an American ethnomusicologist and anthropologist. She specialized in the ways culture and music reflect each other. Herndon grew up in a family of country music performers in North Carolina. After completing her master's degree in 1964 at Tulane University, she performed classical music for several years. Earning a PhD in anthropology and ethnomusicology in 1971, she taught at the University of Texas at Austin, the University of California, Berkeley, and the University of Maryland. She is widely known for her contributions to Native American music studies with books such as Native American Music, as well as collaborating on Music as Culture, and Music, Gender, and Culture, which analyze the overlapping of musical forms and cultural structures.

Herndon's works have been used as university textbooks. Her contributions to the field of ethnomusicology were recognized by the Society of Ethnomusicology, which created an award in her name. The Marcia Herndon Prize is allotted to those who focus on the studies of lesbian, gay, bisexual, transgender, and two-spirit communities.

== Early life and education ==
Marcia Alice Herndon was born October 1, 1941, in Canton, North Carolina, close to where her grandparents lived. She spent her early years in the Tennessee and North Carolina hills and performed country music with her family. When she began her formal music training, she turned away from country music, focusing on classical music and performance. She played several different instruments including the organ.

In 1962, Herndon graduated from H. Sophie Newcomb Memorial College in New Orleans, now known as Tulane University, with a bachelor's degree in German. Although she also studied music, covering piano, voice, and organ, Herndon completed her master's degree in German at Tulane University in 1964. Besides German, she spoke English, French, Malagasy, and Spanish. After several years of classical music performance, she returned to school and earned a Ph.D. in anthropology and ethnomusicology in 1971 from Tulane. Her doctoral thesis, under the direction of Norma McLeod, focused on the impact of Maltese music upon the religion and politics of the country. It would become the basis for her article Analysis: The Herding of Sacred Cows?.

== Career ==
Herndon started her career as an assistant professor at the University of Texas at Austin in 1971. She taught ethnomusicology and anthropology at the university for seven years. Before she arrived, the university did not include ethnomusicology in their folklore studies. While teaching in Texas, Herndon developed a course which returned to her roots in country music and examined the genre from an anthropological perspective. Students of the course looked at how country music was viewed culturally as music of white, unsophisticated and lower-class people, even for those who gained fame. It also examined how the genre was used as a gateway for singers like Charley Pride and Johnny Rodriguez to gain acceptance in white society. In 1975, Herndon and McLeod hosted the symposium "Form in Performance: Hard Core Ethnography" in Austin. The conference brought together for the first time scholars of various disciplines to discuss performance as a reflection of culture and societal values. The subsequent publication of the conference proceedings was edited by Herndon.

In 1978, Herndon was hired as the director of Native American Studies the University of California, Berkeley. She became active in the civil rights movements sweeping the country at that time, including the Women's liberation movement in North America. Wanting to create a venue which would support independent scholarship without censorship in ethnomusicological research, in 1984, she founded the Music Research Institute, in Hercules, California. She encouraged research into issues such as the demise of American community orchestras, censorship of lyrics, and the effects to hearing caused by amplified sound. Her activism and support of alternative research led to a fissure with the university and she left in 1985.

Herndon continued working at the Music Research Institute, expanding it from its location in the San Francisco Bay Area by creating branches in Richmond, California and Hyattsville, Maryland. In 1987, she became the co-chair of the International Council for Traditional Music's Music and Gender Study Group, introducing interdisciplinary studies on the cultural construction of gender and its impacts on music and performance. In 1989, Herndon, who had a history of lupus, had a stroke, which resulted in deafness in one ear and left her with sensitivity in her feet. Despite these health issues, in 1990 she became a professor in the division of Musicology and Ethnomusicology at the School of Music at the University of Maryland. At the same time, she served as an affiliate of the Women's Studies Department. Herndon remained active, in spite of a subsequent cancer diagnosis, hosting the international conference, "Gender and the Musics of Death" for the Music and Gender Study Group of the International Council for Traditional Music. The event was hosted at the University of Maryland in November 1996.

== Community involvement ==
Herndon was the Metropolitan (head bishop) of the Ecumenical Catholic Church of America. As Metropolitan, she held the highest national authority of the church founded by the Apostle Thomas in India. Her duties for the church included administrating policies, counselling her congregations, officiating at weddings, and ordaining gay and lesbian priests.

Herndon and her partner, Billye Talmadge, were together twenty years until the time of her death. Despite her desire for privacy surrounding her personal life, Herndon was an active member of her community, focusing on the cultural issues of racial equality, sexual and gender diversity, and religious freedom and tolerance. She encouraged academic cooperation rather than competition, and believed that cultural studies were imperative for a full understanding of global situations and catastrophic events, such as aggression, censorship, and ethics, as well as health, power, and war.

== Contributions to ethnomusicology ==
Herndon's work encompassed a broad spectrum of cultural examination. She examined symphony orchestras in New Orleans and Oakland and studied the jazz funerals of those African American carnival revelers known as Mardi Gras Indians. Over the years she analyzed the culture of urban Native Americans in Texas, variations of pow wow celebrations in native societies, refugees from Tibet in Switzerland, the impact of aggression and violence reflected in music in Bosnia, and hymns of Martin Luther King. Field work studies included work on the perceptions of young people in regard to rock music and the impact of amplification on hearing. Her interests combined her anthropological interests with her interests in music and cultural change, healing, and gender studies.

Herndon wrote about Eastern Band Cherokee music and performance. Her contributions to the field included The Cherokee Ballgame Cycle: An Ethnomusicologists Viewpoint (1971) and Native American Music (1980). In The Cherokee Ballgame Cycle, Herndon discussed how she believed Cherokee ballgames reflected the cultural organization of their society through performance, with the ballgames organized to reflect the political and religious organization of the local settlements. Each town, and the game, had a division of white peace officials and red war officials with representatives from each of the seven matrilineal clans. She wrote that labor was divided by sex, as were the songs sung during the game to motivate the players. In Native American Music, Herndon took an anthropological analysis of culture, via comparison of Euro-American and Native American traditions.

Herndon saw music as an expression of culture; Cynthia Tse Kimberlin wrote that she was one of the pioneers in evaluating music from a gender perspective. For example, in her work Music, Gender, and Culture, co-written with Susanne Ziegler, Herndon explained that sex and gender are different things. She states that sex describes the physical body, and that gender describes one's individual cultural role and status. The book describes how individuals perceive their gender and gender traits based upon their society, and details some of the ways society rewards and punishes certain behaviors related to one's gender – for example, by restricting or allowing who can be a vocalist or instrumentalist. Her study The Bormliza: Maltese Folksong Style and Women with McLeod noted that women in Malta who sing in public places are considered to be prostitutes, while those who refrain from public performance are deemed to be of good moral character. Music as Culture written with her former doctoral advisor McLeod, has been used as a university textbook. The premise of the book was that music was not simply an activity that was part of culture, but a representation of culture itself. Steven Feld, in his review of the work, clarified the point that "sound structure is a social structure, every musical organization a social organization, learning to sing is learning to be a social being, good rhythm is socialization, and so forth".

== Death and legacy ==
Herndon died on May 19, 1997, in Hyattsville, Maryland, from complications of lupus, breast cancer, and liver cancer. Herndon worked with the Society for Ethnomusicology beginning in 1971. She served on its council for three terms – 1976–1979, 1980–1983, and 1988–1991 – and on its board of directors between 1981 and 1983. In recognition of her service to both the organization and the field of ethnomusicology, the Society of Ethnomusicology created an award in her name, which recognizes excellence in studies of lesbian, gay, bisexual, transgender, and two-spirit communities. Her papers are held in the collection of the Michelle Smith Performing Arts Library on the campus of the University of Maryland in College Park, Maryland.

== Selected works ==
- Herndon, Marcia (September 1971). "The Cherokee Ballgame Cycle: An Ethnomusicologist's View". Ethnomusicology. 15 (3). Champaign, Illinois: University of Illinois Press for the Society for Ethnomusicology: 339–352. doi:10.2307/850634. ISSN 0014-1836. JSTOR 850634. OCLC 79038677.
- Herndon, Marcia (May 1974). "Analysis: The Herding of Sacred Cows?". Ethnomusicology. 18 (2). Champaign, Illinois: University of Illinois Press for the Society for Ethnomusicology: 219–262. doi:10.2307/850580. ISSN 0014-1836. JSTOR 850580. OCLC 5556141795.
- Herndon, Marcia, ed. (1976). Proceedings of a Symposium on Form in Performance: Hard-core Ethnography. Form in Performance: Hard-core Ethnography, Held at the University of Texas, Austin, April 17 to 19, 1975. Austin, Texas: Office of the College of Fine Arts, University of Texas. OCLC 215392558.
- McLeod, Norma; Herndon, Marcia (January–March 1975). "The Bormliza: Maltese Folksong Style and Women". Journal of American Folklore. 88 (347). Bloomington, Indiana: American Folklore Society: 81–100. doi:10.2307/539187. ISSN 0021-8715. JSTOR 539187. OCLC 5548782943.
- Herndon, Marcia; McLeod, Norma (1979). Music as Culture. Norwood, Pennsylvania: Norwood Editions. OCLC 602614481.
- Herndon, Marcia (1980). Native American Music. Norwood, Pennsylvania: Norwood Editions. ISBN 978-0-8482-4475-0.
- McLeod, Norma; Herndon, Marcia (1980). The Ethnography of Musical Performance. Norwood, Pennsylvania: Norwood Editions. ISBN 978-0-8482-4416-3.
- Herndon, Marcia; McLeod, Norma (1983). Field Manual for Ethnomusicology. Norwood, Pennsylvania: Norwood Editions. OCLC 637781307.
- Herndon, Marcia (1988). "Cultural Engagement: The Case of the Oakland Symphony Orchestra". Yearbook for Traditional Music. 20. Cambridge, Cambridgeshire: Cambridge University Press: 134–145. doi:10.2307/768170. ISSN 0740-1558. JSTOR 768170. OCLC 5548116247. S2CID 191393401.
- Herndon, Marcia; Ziegler, Susanne (1990). Music, Gender, and Culture. Intercultural Music Studies. Vol. 1. Wilhelmshaven, Germany: Florian Noetzel Verlag. ISBN 978-3-7959-0593-4.
