= Council on Religion and the Homosexual =

The Council on Religion and the Homosexual (CRH) was a San Francisco, California, United States–based organization founded in 1964 for the purpose of joining homosexual activists and religious leaders.

== Formation ==
The CRH was formed in 1964 by Glide Memorial Methodist Church, as well as Daughters of Bilitis (DOB) founders Phyllis Lyon and Del Martin. It included representatives of Methodist, Episcopal, Lutheran, and United Church of Christ denominations.

In the early 1960s, as social change accelerated across the U.S., progressive clergymen increasingly took to the streets to minister to marginalized persons. The Rev. Ted McIlvenna, who worked for the Glide Urban Center, a private Methodist foundation in downtown San Francisco, witnessed the oppression and violence homosexuals faced, and to improve the situation sought a dialogue between clergy and homosexuals.

With the support of the Methodist church, McIlvenna convened the Mill Valley Conference from May 31 to June 2, 1964, at which sixteen Methodist, Protestant Episcopal, United Church of Christ, and Lutheran clergymen met with thirteen leaders of the homosexual community, including DOB members Cleo Bonner, Pat Walker, Billye Talmadge, Phyllis Lyon, and Del Martin.

Following the initial meeting, the participants began plans for a new organization that would educate religious communities about gay and lesbian issues as well as enlist religious leaders to advocate for homosexual concerns. In July 1964, the participants, along with several other clergymen and homosexual activists, met and formed the Council on Religion and the Homosexual (CRH), which was incorporated in December of that year. The CRH was the first group in the U.S. to use the word "homosexual" in its name.

== Activities ==
=== 1965 fundraiser ===
On the eve of January 1, 1965, several homophile organizations in San Francisco, California – including the CRH, the Daughters of Bilitis, the Society for Individual Rights, and the Mattachine Society – held a fund-raising ball for their mutual benefit at California Hall on Polk Street. San Francisco police had agreed not to interfere; however, on the evening of the ball, the police showed up in force and surrounded the hall and focused numerous kleig lights on the entrance to the hall. As each of the 600 plus persons entering the ball approached the entrance, the police took their photographs. Police vans were parked in plain view near the entrance to the ball. Evander Smith, a gay lawyer for the groups organizing the ball including the CRH, and gay lawyer Herb Donaldson tried to stop the police from conducting the fourth "inspection" of the evening; both were arrested, along with two heterosexual lawyers – Elliott Leighton and Nancy May - who were supporting the rights of the participants to gather at the ball. But twenty-five of the most prominent lawyers in San Francisco joined the defense team for the four lawyers, and the judge directed the jury to find the four not guilty before the defense had even had a chance to begin their argumentation when the case came to court. This event has been called "San Francisco's Stonewall" by some historians; the participation of such prominent litigators in the defense of Smith, Donaldson and the other two lawyers marked a turning point in gay rights on the West Coast of the United States.

=== Candidate's Night ===
In 1965, CRH held an event where local politicians could be questioned about issues concerning gay and lesbian people, including police intimidation. The event marks the first known instance of "the gay vote" being sought, which led lesbian activist Barbara Gittings to say "It was remarkable. That was something that [gay] people in San Francisco were way ahead of the rest of the country in doing."

== See also ==
- List of LGBT actions in the United States prior to the Stonewall riots
