= California Hall (San Francisco) =

Historic building in San Francisco

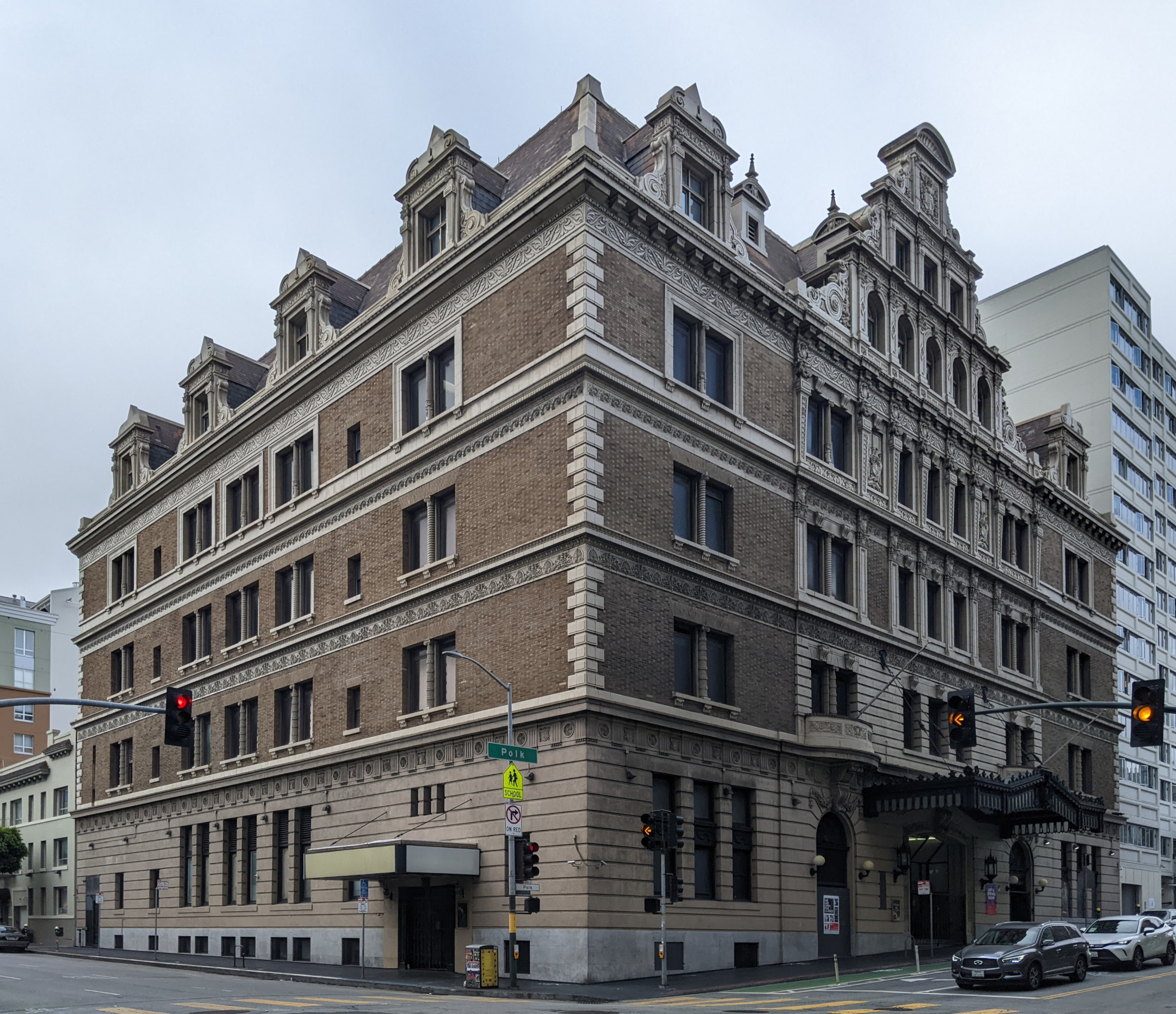
- California Hall in 2022

- Location within San Francisco County Location within California
- 37.782455°N 122.419220°W
- Location: 625 Polk Street, San Francisco, California, U.S.

History
- Built for: German Association

Site notes
- Architect: Frederick Herman Meyer
- Architectural style: German Baroque

San Francisco Designated Landmark
- Designated: October 7, 1984
- Reference no.: 174

California Hall, originally named Das Deutsche Haus (English: The German House, sometimes also referred to in incorrect German as Das Deutsches Haus), is a historic commercial building and event venue built in 1912, located in the Polk Gulch/Tenderloin neighborhood in San Francisco, California.

It started as a German social meeting hall. In 1965, it was the location of a fundraiser event for gay charities that brought trouble with the police and an ensuing legal battle. This event has been described a turning point in gay rights in the west coast.

In the mid-1960s and 1970s, it was a popular concert hall; performers that played at the California Hall include Jefferson Airplane, Moby Grape, Big Brother and the Holding Company, the Grateful Dead, and Quicksilver Messenger Service.

The building presently is part of the Academy of Art University campus. The California Hall has been listed as a San Francisco Designated Landmark since October 7, 1984.

== History ==
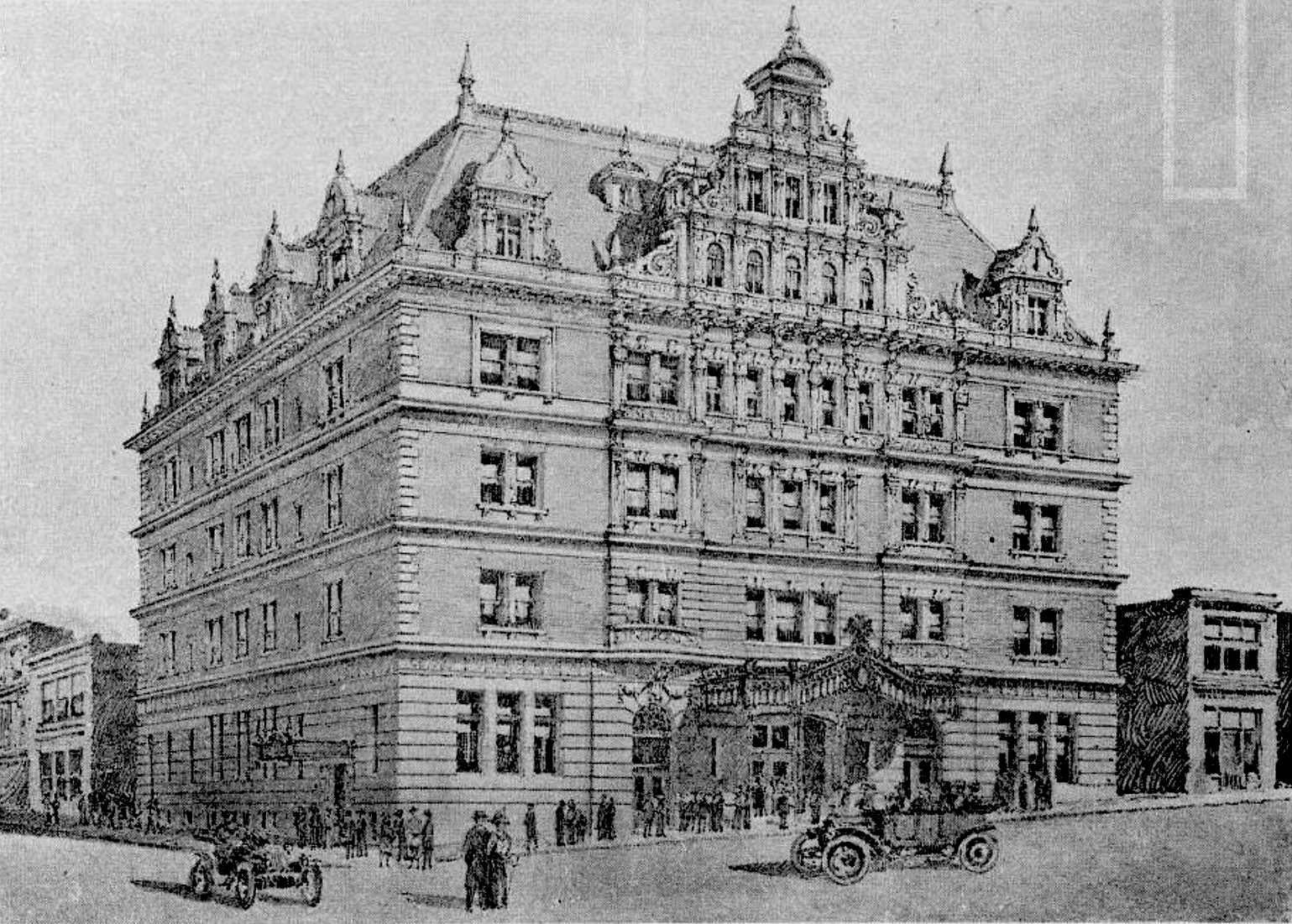
The planned building depicted before its construction

In 1912, when the Das Deutsche Haus was built, Polkstrasse (now Polk Street) was a main commercial shopping center for German immigrants. The architect was Frederick H. Meyer and the design of the building was influenced by the Heidelberg Castle in Germany. There was a restaurant in the basement called the Rathskeller.

It was originally used as a meeting space by 43 German societies and fraternities. In 1918, the building's name was changed to California Hall, as part of what has been described as a general "process of physically removing the presence of German influence" in San Francisco following the entry of the US into World War I on the side opposing Germany. German American Bund, a Nazi organization for Americans of German-descent, held meetings in the building prior to World War II. In October 1938, it was the venue of a "German Day" celebration attended by 2500 members of German societies, with speeches by mayor Rossi and Nazi Germany's Consul General von Killinger, protested by 150 anti-Nazi demonstrators outside the building.

The building was featured in the action movie, Dirty Harry (1971). The building previously housed the California Culinary Academy, and it is presently part of the Academy of Art University campus.

== 1965 New Years Ball ==
In the 1950s gay men started to visit Polk Street, specifically the area near California Hall in Lower Polk. The 1965 New Years Ball (a fundraiser for the Council on Religion and the Homosexual, and other homophile organizations) was held January 1, 1965 at the California Hall. During the event, the police interfered with the gay attendees by taking photos of each person entering the building; which prompted a legal battle led by Evander Smith and Herb Donaldson. The 1965 event had marked a turning point in gay rights on the west coast.

By 1971, Polk Street was advertised as "one of the gayest streets in San Francisco". A migration from Polk Street to the Castro District happened in the 1970s, for more affordable housing.

== Music venue ==
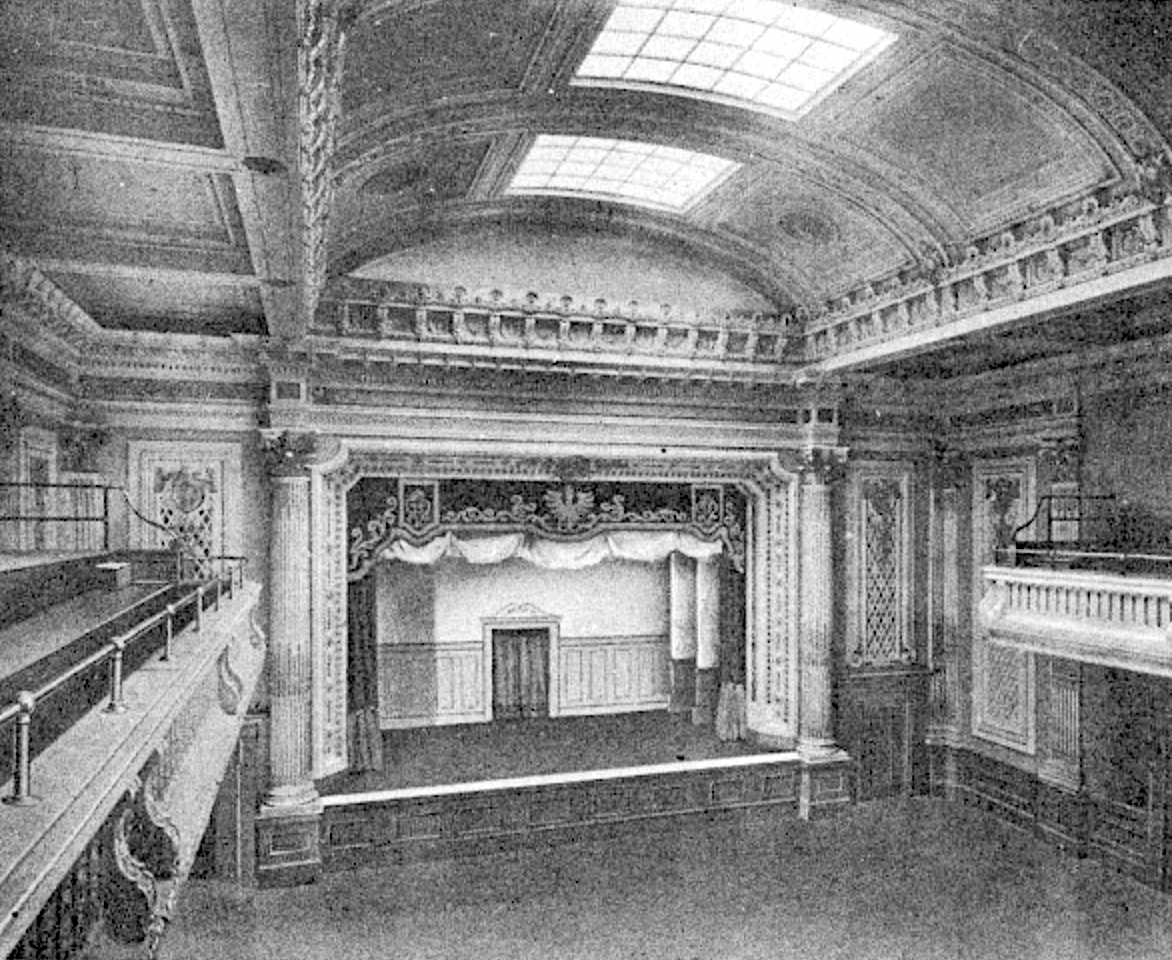
Auditorium of Das Deutsches Haus (in 1912)

The California Hall building has an auditorium that served as a periodic concert hall, primarily for rock bands in the mid-1960s. In 1965, the venue hosted two productions by Family Dog; The Charlatans with the Ken Kesey and the Merry Pranksters Acid Tests happening (at the same time at The Fillmore, a bus moved between the two music halls).

The Grateful Dead played with The Charlatans on May 29, 1966; and on October 31, 1966, with Quicksilver Messenger Service and Mimi Farina. On June 19, 1966, Carlos Santana played with the three person Mockers band.

On August 28, 1977, punk bands played including the Avengers, The Nuns, and Mary Monday. The last California Hall concerts were held in 1983.
