= Herb Donaldson (lawyer) =

American lawyer

Herbert Donaldson (February 12, 1927 – December 5, 2008) was an openly gay San Francisco lawyer and judge who gained national attention for his efforts to legally block San Francisco police from harassing attendees of a fund-raising ball for the Council on Religion and the Homosexual, an early homophile organization, on January 1, 1965.

== Police harassment at California Hall ==
On the eve of January 1, 1965, several homophile organizations in San Francisco, California - including the Council on Religion and the Homosexual, the Society for Individual Rights, the Daughters of Bilitis, and the Mattachine Society - held a fund-raising ball for their mutual benefit at the California Hall. Prior to the ball, several of the ministers from the Council on Religion met with San Francisco police, who tried to get them to cancel it. The clergy members declined to cancel the event, and San Francisco police agreed not to interfere. However, on the evening of the ball, the police showed up in force and surrounded the California Hall and focused numerous kleig lights on the entrance to the hall. As each of the 600 plus persons entering the ball approached the entrance, the police took their photographs. A number of police vans were parked in plain view near the entrance to the ball.

Evander Smith, a lawyer for the groups organizing the ball, and Herb Donaldson tried to stop the police from conducting the fourth "inspection" of the evening; both were arrested, along with two heterosexual lawyers - Elliott Leighton and Nancy May - who were supporting the rights of the participants to gather at the ball.

On January 2, 1965, ministers associated with the Council on Religion and the Homosexual held a news conference in protest of Smith, Donaldson, and the other two lawyers arrested as well as the police harassment to which the ball attendees had been subjected. Twenty-five of the most prominent lawyers in San Francisco joined the defense team for the four lawyers, and the judge directed the jury to find the four not-guilty before the defense had even had a chance to begin their argumentation when the case came to court.

The event has been called "San Francisco's Stonewall" by some historians; the participation of such prominent litigators in the defense of Smith, Donaldson and the other two lawyers marked a turning point in gay rights on the West Coast of the United States.

== Later career ==
Governor Jerry Brown appointed Donaldson as the first openly gay male municipal court judge in the state of California in 1983. He retired in 1999. Four years later, he began serving a three-year term as judge of San Francisco's new Behavioral Health Court.

== Legacy ==
Season 2, episode 9 of the podcast “Making Gay History” is about Donaldson and Evander Smith.

== See also ==
- List of LGBT jurists in the United States
