= Cleo Bonner =

African american civil rights leader

- Other name: Cleo Glenn
- Known for: President of the Daughters of Bilitis
- Notable work: The Ladder (Magazine)

Cleo Bonner, also known as Cleo Glenn, served as president of the Daughters of Bilitis and circulation manager of The Ladder magazine in the 1960s. She was one of the first African-American women to belong to this organization. Barbara Gittings referred to Cleo Glenn as a "fireball".

== Leadership of the Daughters of Bilitis ==
Cleo Bonner was an early member of the Daughters of Bilitis (DOB) and one of the few African American women associated with this organization in the early 1960s. Bonner was also known as Cleo Glenn in order to protect her privacy. She assumed the role of acting president of DOB in the fall of 1963. Bonner served as president of DOB until 1966. Her leadership of DOB was featured in a 1990 article in the Bay Area Reporter.

== 1964 Convention ==
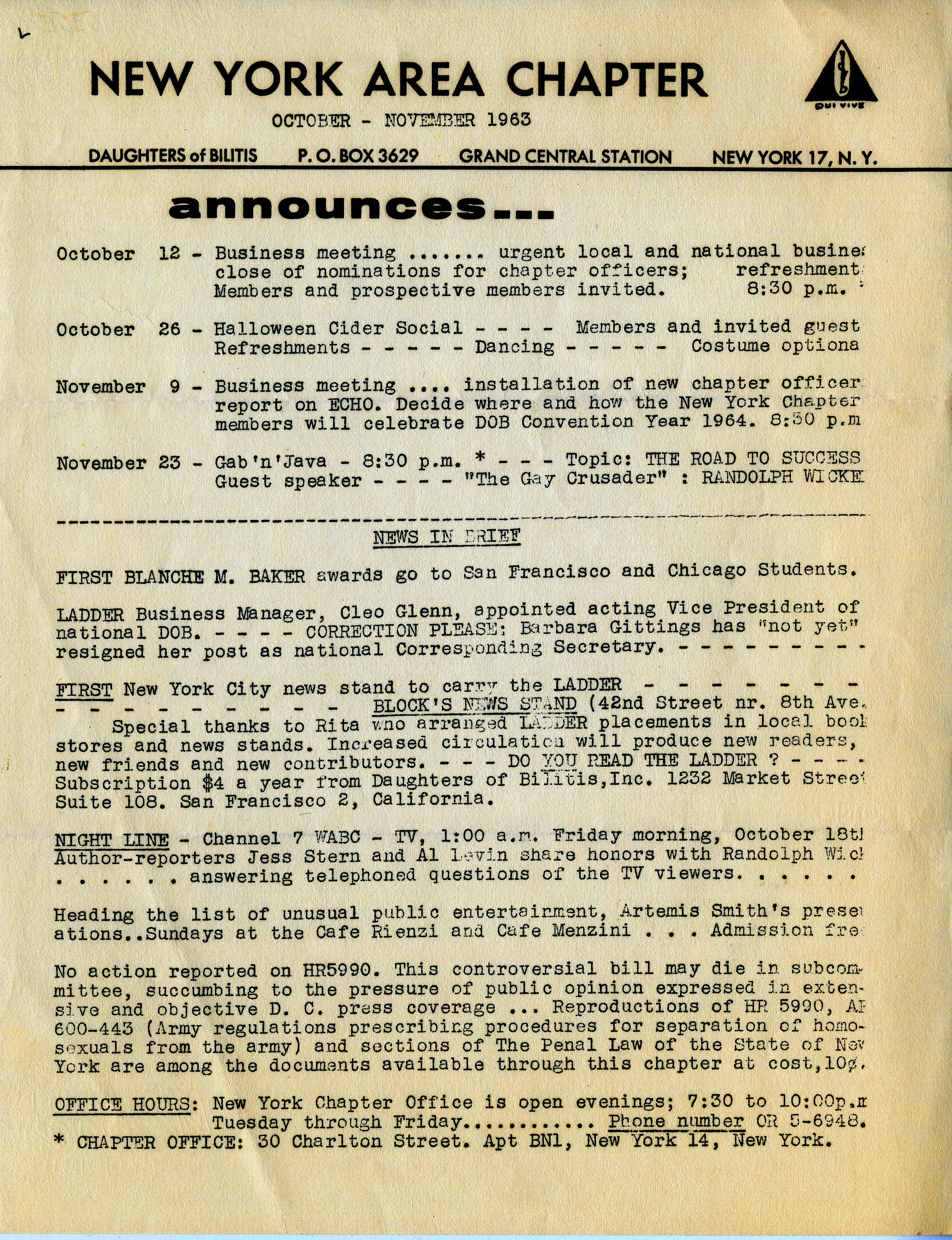
Daughters of Bilitis Newsletter mentioning Cleo Glenn

Under the name Cleo Glenn, Bonner served as chair of the 3rd annual 1964 Daughters of Bilitis Convention held on June 20 in New York. Speakers at this convention included Dr. Wardell B. Pomeroy and Dr.Sylvia Fava.

== Involvement with The Ladder magazine ==
Bonner served as circulation manager for The Ladder, the magazine produced and distributed by DOB. The June 1964 edition listed Bonner as president and featured in the 1964 DOB convention on the cover.

== Personal life ==
Cleo was in a committed relationship with a white woman named Helen Cushman when she joined DOB in 1960. She raised a son while working at Pacific Bell telephone company.

== See also ==
- Phyllis Lyon
- Del Martin
