= Seminole music =

Indigenous music genre of North America

Seminole music is the music of the Seminole people, an indigenous people of the Americas who formed in Florida in the 18th century. Today most live in Oklahoma, but a minority continue in Florida. They have three federally recognized tribes, and some people belong to bands outside those groups. Their traditional music includes extensive use of rattles, hand drums, water drums, and flutes.

Seminole folk songs include those used to treat the sick and injured, and to encourage animals to be easily hunted. Hunting songs are a cappella and call-and-response.

The two major ritual dances are the Green Corn Dance, held in June, and the Hunting Dance, held in October. Other informal dances are held throughout the year, with some specific dances only performed in either summer or winter. Many dances are connected with an animal spirit, such as the Snake, the Crawfish and the very important Alligator.

Western Presbyterian Christian missionaries and Creek translators developed Muskogee language hymns in the 1830s that continue to be sung in Creek and Seminole churches today in Oklahoma. The hymns are syncretic constructions with texts and performance practices that carry Muskogee and Western meanings at once.
