= Daughters of Bilitis =

First American lesbian civil rights group

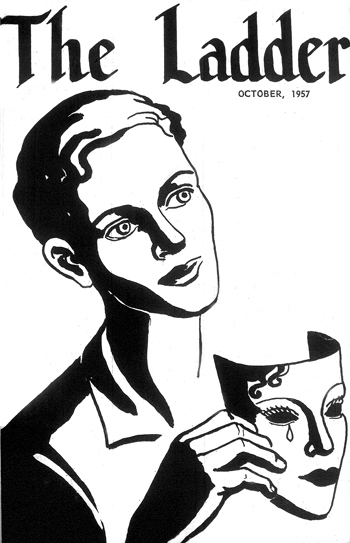
- Front cover of the May 1966 issue of The Ladder, set up by the Daughters of Bilitis, it was published from 1956 to 1972.
- Formation: 1955; 71 years ago
- Dissolved: 1995; 31 years ago (last chapter)
- Type: Grassroots
- Purpose: Lesbian civil and political rights
- Headquarters: San Francisco, California, United States
- Official language: English
- Key people: Del Martin and Phyllis Lyon

The Daughters of Bilitis (/bɪˈliːtɪs/), also called the DOB or the Daughters, was the first lesbian civil and political rights organization in the United States. The organization, formed in San Francisco in 1955, was initially conceived as a secret social club, an alternative to lesbian bars, which were subject to raids and police harassment.

As the DOB gained members, its focus shifted to providing support to women who were afraid to come out and to becoming politically active. The DOB educated them about their rights and about gay history. Historian Lillian Faderman declared, "Its very establishment in the midst of witch-hunts and police harassment was an act of courage, since members always had to fear that they were under attack, not because of what they did, but merely because of who they were." The Daughters of Bilitis endured for 40 years, becoming an educational resource for lesbians, gay men, researchers and mental health professionals.

== Background ==
After World War II, the rise of the Soviet Union and start of the Cold War resulted in increasing concerns in the United States about potential communists in the US government, and vulnerability of civil and political workers to threats from communists due to their personal lives. The U.S. Congress began to require the registration of members of "subversive groups".

In 1950, the U.S. State Department declared homosexuals to be security risks (because of perceived vulnerability to blackmail, as the practice was illegal). A succession of increasingly repressive acts followed, which included the dismissal of federal, state and local government employees suspected of being homosexual; politically motivated police raids on gay bars all over the US and Canada; and the enactment of laws prohibiting cross-dressing for men and women. More specifically in San Francisco, where the Daughters of Bilitis was later founded, police on September 8, 1954, raided lesbian bars such as Adler and Tommy's Place.

== History ==
In 1955, Del Martin and Phyllis Lyon had been lovers for three years when they complained to a gay male couple that they did not know any other lesbians. The gay couple introduced Martin and Lyon to another lesbian couple, one of whom, a Filipina woman named Rosalie "Rose" Bamberger, suggested they create a social club. The original founding couples met on September 21, 1955. Attendees included: Rose Bamberger and Rosemary Sliepen, Del Martin and Phyllis Lyon, Marcia Foster and her partner June, and Noni Frey and her partner Mary. Rose and Rosemary, who were both working class and employed at brush-manufacturing factories, hosted the meeting in their home. The founding members wanted to have a place to dance, as dancing with the same sex in a public place was illegal.

Martin and Lyon recalled later, "Women needed privacy...not only from the watchful eye of the police, but from gaping tourists in the bars and from inquisitive parents and families." Although unsure of exactly how to proceed with the group, the women began to meet regularly, realized they should be organized, and quickly elected Martin as president. From the start they also focused on educating other women about lesbians to reduce self-loathing resulting from the socially repressive times.

=== Naming ===
The group named the club at their second meeting. Bilitis is the name given to a fictional lesbian contemporary of the Greek poet Sappho by the French poet Pierre Louÿs in his 1894 work The Songs of Bilitis. Bilitis lived on the Isle of Lesbos alongside Sappho. The women chose the name for its obscurity; even Martin and Lyon did not know what it meant. "Daughters" was meant to evoke association with other American social associations such as the Daughters of the American Revolution.

Early DOB members felt they had to follow two contradictory approaches: trying to recruit interested potential members and being secretive. Martin and Lyon justified the name, writing later, "If anyone asked us, we could always say we belong to a poetry club." They also designed a pin to wear to be able to identify with others, chose club colors and voted on the motto "Qui vive", French for "on alert". The organization filed a charter for non-profit corporation status in 1957, writing a description so vague, Phyllis Lyon remembered, "it could have been a charter for a cat-raising club."

=== Mission ===
Within a year of the group's creation, most of the original eight members were no longer active, but overall numbers had increased to 16. The women decided they wanted to be more than a social alternative to bars. Several working-class women of the original members were not comfortable with being more public, and left to form two secret groups for lesbians: Quatrefoil and Hale Aikane.

Historian Marcia Gallo writes of the shift in DOB members, "They recognized that many women felt shame about their sexual desires and were afraid to admit them. They knew that...without support to develop the self-confidence necessary to advocate for one's rights, no social change would be possible for lesbians."

By 1959 additional chapters of the DOB had been founded in New York City, Los Angeles, Chicago, and Rhode Island. Upon arrival at a meeting, attendees would be greeted at the door. In a show of good faith, the greeter would say, "I'm ---. Who are you? You don't have to give me your real name, not even your real first name."

Soon after forming, the DOB wrote a mission statement that addressed the most significant problem Martin and Lyon had faced as a couple: the complete lack of information about female homosexuality in what historian Martin Meeker termed "the most fundamental journey a lesbian has to make." When the club realized they were not allowed to advertise their meetings in the local newspaper, Lyon and Martin, who both had backgrounds in journalism, began to print a newsletter to distribute to as many women as the group knew. In October 1956 it became The Ladder, the first nationally distributed lesbian publication in the U.S. It was one of the first to publish statistics on lesbians, as the pair surveyed their readers in 1958 and 1964, and compiled and published the results. Martin was the first president and Lyon became the editor of The Ladder.

The DOB advertised as "A Woman's Organization for the purpose of Promoting the Integration of the Homosexual into Society." Their mission statement was composed of four parts; it was printed on the inside of the cover of every issue of The Ladder until 1970:

1. Education of the variant...to enable her to understand herself and make her adjustment to society...this to be accomplished by establishing...a library...on the sex deviant theme; by sponsoring public discussions...to be conducted by leading members of the legal, psychiatric, religious and other professions; by advocating a mode of behavior and dress acceptable to society.
2. Education of the public...leading to an eventual breakdown of erroneous taboos and prejudices...
3. Participation in research projects by duly authorized and responsible psychologists, sociologists, and other such experts directed towards further knowledge of the homosexual.
4. Investigation of the penal code as it pertain to the homosexual, proposal of changes,...and promotion of these changes through the due process of law in the state legislatures.

New York chapter president Barbara Gittings noted that the word "variant" was used instead of "lesbian" in the mission statement because the term "lesbian" in 1956 had a very negative connotation.

=== Methods ===
There was ongoing debate over the propriety of butch and femme dress and role-play among DOB members. As early as 1955 members made a rule that women who attended meetings, if wearing pants, should be wearing women's slacks. However, many women remember this rule was seldom observed; at many meetings women were wearing jeans, and in the 1950s the only type for sale were men's.

Barbara Gittings recalled that even years later, in preparation for a national convention, members of the DOB persuaded a woman who had worn men's clothing all her life "to deck herself out in as 'feminine' a manner as she could... Everyone rejoiced over this as though some great victory had been accomplished... Today we would be horrified at anyone who thought this kind of evangelism had a legitimate purpose."

In the 1959 mayoral race in San Francisco, challenger and city tax assessor Russell Leroy Wolden Jr. made homosexuality a public issue, claiming that incumbent George Christopher was making the city safe for "sex deviants". Wolden's campaign distributed materials that stated, "You parents of daughters — do not sit back complacently feeling that because you have no boys in your family everything is all right... To enlighten you as to the existence of a Lesbian organization composed of homosexual women, make yourself acquainted with the name Daughters of Bilitis."

The DOB kept only two copies of the subscription list of The Ladder, an attempt to protect it from getting into the hands of anyone who might use it against the subscribers. DOB leaders moved the list from its headquarters and later learned that San Francisco police had searched their office after its removal. Even the FBI was curious enough to attend DOB meetings; an agent reported in 1959, "The purpose of the DOB is to educate the public to accept the Lesbian homosexual into society."

==== National conventions ====
In 1960, the DOB held their first convention in San Francisco. Press releases announcing the convention were sent to local radio and newspapers, prompting San Francisco Chronicle columnist Herb Caen to direct a jab at Russell Wolden and publicize the convention, writing: "Russ Wolden, if no one else, will be interested to learn that the Daughters of Bilitis will hold their nat'l convention here May 27–30. They're the female counterparts of the Mattachine Society — and one of the convention highlights will be an address by Atty. Morris Lowenthal titled, 'The Gay Bar in the Courts.' Oh brother. I mean sister. Come to think of it, I don't know what I mean...." The blurb was reprinted in the March issue of The Ladder.

Two hundred women attended the conference, as did the San Francisco police, who came to check if any of the DOB members were wearing men's clothes. Del Martin brought them inside to see all the women wearing dresses, stockings and heels. The attendees listened to speakers, including a debate between two attorneys about the legality and morality of gay bars, a presentation by the American Civil Liberties Union, and an Episcopal priest who "served up damnation with dessert". He went on a "tirade" telling the audience they were sinners, to which they listened politely. The DOB gave awards to men who were allied with them, whom they called "Sons of Bilitis", or SOBs. These included their lawyer, photographer, and members of the Mattachine Society who assisted them with the convention.

The second national convention, held in 1962, was notable for being covered on television on the KTTV's Confidential File, a nationally syndicated show. This was probably the first American national broadcast that specifically covered lesbianism. The DOB held further conventions every two years until 1968. Cleo Bonner, under the name Cleo Glenn, gave the welcoming address at the 1964 convention.

=== Change in direction ===
In 1960, letters from readers in The Ladder appeared that expressed exasperation with the DOB's emphasis on conformity. In the 1970s, Del Martin and Phyllis Lyon reflected that by contemporary standards, the early ideals of the DOB for integration and adjustment of the lesbian into society were outmoded. They also remembered that, in the 1950s and early 1960s, many gay men and lesbians considered those ideals unreachable and this approach radical. The number of members of the DOB was never comparable to that of the Mattachine Society. Although some may have considered the DOB's ideals unrealistic, some also considered them too tame.

In 1961, the largest raid on a gay bar in San Francisco resulted in the arrests of 100 people. In a raid in Chicago, police forced women arrested to disrobe to prove they were not wearing men's underwear. The Ladder called for lesbian women to be more politically active. "If we ever hope to win our battle, we must fight. First, unshackle ourselves from fear, for it alone is our omnipresent enemy," read the report.

But in 1962 at the Daughters' second convention, national president Jaye Bell again argued for the pragmatic approach of integration and patience with slow change in the criminal justice system. In 1963 two events happened that changed the course of the organization. The group received a windfall when an anonymous donor (who refused for her name to be recorded, and known to the DOB only as "Pennsylvania") began donating large sums of money to the group: $100,000 over five years. "Pennsylvania" wrote $3,000 checks to different DOB members, who in turn signed them over to the organization. Barbara Gittings took over as editor of The Ladder.

Because The Ladder was the primary method of communication from the leadership of the DOB to individual chapters, the editorship was extremely influential. Gittings made significant changes to the magazine, emphasizing an increase in visibility for the DOB. Specifically, she wanted to align the DOB with the East Coast Homophile Organizations (ECHO), a coalition of other social and political clubs for gays and lesbians. ECHO was established in January 1962, with its formative membership including the DOB chapter in New York, the Mattachine Society chapters in New York and Washington D.C., and the Janus Society. ECHO was meant to facilitate cooperation among homophile organizations and outside administrations.

Audiences were getting impatient with psychiatrists telling them they were mentally ill. In 1964 at an ECHO convention, psychologist Albert Ellis, a featured speaker, stated that "the exclusive homosexual is a psychopath". Someone in the audience responded, "Any homosexual who would come to you for treatment, Dr. Ellis, would have to be a psychopath!" a comment that was met with applause.

In 1964, Martin and Lyon began to control less of the organization, saying: "We felt that if the organization had any validity at all it couldn't be based on two people, it had to be able to stand and grow on its own. And it was never going to do it if we didn't move out."

Martin and Lyon joined the newly formed Council on Religion and the Homosexual (CRH) to develop a dialogue between organized religion and gays and lesbians. They urged the DOB to join the organization as well, but a previous rule precluded the DOB from joining separate organizations. (This had been established under earlier conditions, primarily to ensure it would not join organizations that sympathized with Communist aims.)

However, at times the DOB did collaborate with the CRH. Most notably, on the eve of January 1, 1965, several homophile organizations in San Francisco, including the DOB, the CRH, the Society for Individual Rights, and the Mattachine Society, held a fund-raising ball for their mutual benefit at California Hall on Polk Street. Although San Francisco police had agreed not to interfere, on the evening of the ball, the police showed up in force and surrounded the California Hall. They focused numerous klieg lights on the entrance, and photographed each of the 600-plus persons who entered. Numerous police vans were parked in plain view near the entrance to the ball, further intimidating attendees.

Evander Smith, a lawyer for the groups organizing the ball including the DOB, and Herb Donaldson tried to stop the police from conducting the fourth "inspection" of the evening; both were arrested along with two heterosexual lawyers, Elliott Leighton and Nancy May, who were supporting the rights of participants to gather at the ball. Twenty-five of the most prominent lawyers in San Francisco joined the defense team for the four lawyers. When the case came to court, the judge directed the jury to find the four not guilty before the defense had begun their argumentation. This event has been called "San Francisco's Stonewall" by some historians; the participation of such prominent litigators in the defense of Smith, Donaldson and the other two lawyers marked a turning point in gay rights on the west coast of the United States.

The homophile movement was also influenced by the gains of activism of the civil rights movement. (In 1964 Cleo Bonner, an African American, was elected as the DOB's national president.) Higher-profile members of the DOB, such as Barbara Gittings, Del Martin and Phyllis Lyon, began to picket the White House, the State Department, and other federal buildings in 1965 and 1966 with members of the Mattachine Society. Gittings, as editor of The Ladder, encouraged others to do the same, and their activism became controversial in the leadership of the DOB. Gittings also ran a regular column in The Ladder that she called "Living Propaganda", encouraging women to come out to their friends and family members.

Frank Kameny frequently contributed, also urging political action. Some readers responded positively to Kameny, who in a speech declared homosexuals as normal as heterosexuals; some were put off by the political tone. Others were angered by Kameny, as a man, suggesting to them what they should do. DOB leaders disliked Kameny and disagreed with Gittings's decisions for the magazine, and she was let go as editor in 1966.

=== Rise of feminism ===
Del Martin has written that the Daughters of Bilitis was a feminist organization from the beginning, focusing on the problems of women as well as problems of the female homosexual; however, in the mid-1960s feminism became a much higher priority to many of the members. In 1966, Del Martin and Phyllis Lyon joined the National Organization for Women, and urged readers of The Ladder to do the same, reporting they got a family discount.

Historian Martin Meeker notes that the 1966 DOB convention, a 10-day affair joining the DOB with the North American Conference of Homophile Organizations (NACHO), was the turning point where women's issues in the DOB began to have more importance to its members than gay issues. It was the largest convention DOB had yet organized, publicized in mass media all over San Francisco, and attended by a large panel of nationally known speakers. Many of the presentations focused on topics that were exclusively male-centered.

In a November 1966 essay by DOB president Shirley Willer, she pointed out differences in problems faced by gay men and lesbians: gay men dealt more with police harassment, entrapment, solicitation, sex in public places, and until recently few women were being arrested for cross-dressing. Willer noted that problems specific to lesbians were job security and advancement, and family relationships, child custody, and visitation. Feeling as if their issues were not being addressed by homophile organizations, because many members of the DOB felt that homophile organizations did not address their issues, they began to emphasize that lesbians had more in common with heterosexual women than with gay men.

The Daughters were also affected by the changing times. Younger members did not share the concerns of older members; they were more moved by revolutionary tactics. (Though not all older members in the DOB were anti-radical; for example, as president of the New York chapter of the DOB, Ruth Simpson organized gay rights demonstrations as well as educational programs for DOB members during the period of 1969–71. Several times when NYC police, without warrants, illegally entered DOB's lesbian center in Lower Manhattan, Simpson stood between the police and the DOB women. On three occasions she was cited by police and required to go to court appearances.)

Tensions increased because problems in organization of the national governing board increased, while local chapters were unable to take action on issues important to them without national approval. Some members became disillusioned and left, and younger lesbians were more attracted to feminist organizations. By the time the 1968 convention was held in Denver, fewer than two dozen women attended.

=== Controversial ending ===
Longtime DOB member Helen Sandoz had taken over editing The Ladder following an interim period after Barbara Gittings left. Sandoz became burdened by the responsibilities of the job, which adversely affected her primary personal relationship. In 1968 she passed the editing duties on to Barbara Grier, who had been contributing to the magazine as a book reviewer and poetry writer. Grier edited the magazine from Kansas City. She was a relative newcomer to the workings of the DOB, despite contributing to the magazine since 1957.

Grier had high aspirations for The Ladder. She removed the subtitle "A Lesbian Review" from the cover, placed there in 1964 by Gittings, in order to attract more women readers. She doubled the size of the magazine, expanding every section, and devoted much of the space in the magazine to feminist ideals. She reported the first DOB chapter in Australia in 1969 and attempts to form chapters in New Zealand and Scandinavia. In 1970, convinced that the DOB was falling apart and The Ladder must be saved, Grier worked with DOB president Rita LaPorte to take the subscriber list from the DOB headquarters in San Francisco to Reno and expand the magazine further.

There were still only two copies of the subscription list. Despite assurances The Ladder had given subscribers that their names would be kept confidential, LaPorte took the list of 3,800 names from DOB headquarters and the printers without telling anyone but Grier. When Del Martin and Phyllis Lyon discovered it was missing, they believed the police or FBI had confiscated it.

Previous editors Martin, Lyon, Gittings, and Sandoz considered the act a theft. Because LaPorte took the list over state lines, pursuing it would have been a federal matter, and the Daughters did not have the resources to see it through. Grier severed ties with DOB leadership and in doing so took away the Daughters' primary method of communication from the national organization to its individual chapters. As a national organization, the Daughters of Bilitis folded in 1970. Some local chapters still continued until 1995.

Grier also effectively ended The Ladder, despite her plans for the magazine to run on advertising (something The Ladder had not previously had) and subscriptions. When the $3,000 checks from "Pennsylvania" written to the DOB stopped coming, by 1972, The Ladder had run out of funds and it folded.

Dozens of other lesbian and feminist organizations were created in the wake of the Daughters of Bilitis. However, the influence of the 14-year run of the DOB on the lives of women was described by historian Martin Meeker thus: "The DOB succeeded in linking hundreds of lesbians across the country with one another and gathering them into a distinctly modern communication network that was mediated through print and, consequently, imagination, rather than sight, sound, smell, and touch."

== Organizational archives ==
The complete surviving organizational records of the national office and the San Francisco Chapter of the Daughters of Bilitis are available to researchers as part of the Phyllis Lyon and Del Martin Papers at the GLBT Historical Society, a nonprofit archives and research center in San Francisco. An online finding aid provides a detailed catalog of the collection.

The Lesbian Herstory Archives hosts the Red Dot Collection, which consists of the library of the New York City chapter of the Daughters of Bilitis.

Boston's The History Project archive houses the Boston Daughters of Bilitis Collection, which contains the Boston chapter's organization records, as well as the publication records of Boston DOB's magazine Maiden Voyage, later renamed Focus.

The University of California, Berkeley Libraries houses a partial collection of digitized publications of the Daughters' publication, The Ladder; This collection includes Volumes 5–16. Alexander Street Libraries also houses a partial collection, including Volumes 1-2 and 9–16.

== See also ==
- The Ladder
- Daughters of Bilitis (Australia)
- Beth Elliott
- Cleo Bonner
- Ruth Simpson
- Homophile Movement
- History of lesbianism in the United States
- Minorities Research Group
