= Illegal operation =

Illegal operation may refer to:

== Medicine ==
- Illegal operation (euphemism), an archaic term for abortion
- Abortion, a medical intervention to terminate a human pregnancy
- Organ theft

== Computing ==
- Illegal opcode
- General protection fault

== Other ==
- Illegal taxi operation
- Criminal organization
  - Criminal conspiracy
- The Illegal Operation (sculpture), a 1962 assemblage sculpture by Edward Kienholz

== See also ==
- Operation (disambiguation)
