= Kienholz =

Kienholz is a surname, and a place name. It may refer to:

== People ==
- Edward Kienholz (1927–1994), American installation artist and sculptor, was married to Nancy Reddin Kienholz
- Nancy Reddin Kienholz (1943–2019), American mixed media artist, was married to Edward Kienholz
- Willis Kienholz (1875–1958), American football player and coach

== Places ==
- A settlement in the Swiss municipality of Brienz
