= John C. Glahe =

American legislator

John C. Glahe (died November 21, 1958) was a mining executive and state legislator in Idaho. He served in the Idaho House of Representatives for Kootenai County after being elected in 1898. He served in 1899.

Glahe was born in Fort Madison, Iowa where he grew up. He moved to Hope, Idaho in 1887.

He was president of the Washington Mining Company in 1899. He was involved in the Black Bear Mines Company Idaho Supreme Court case in 1924.

Glahe died November 21, 1958 at home aged 87.
