= Barney's Beanery =

Chain of American gastropubs

Coordinates: 34.090852°N 118.374630°W

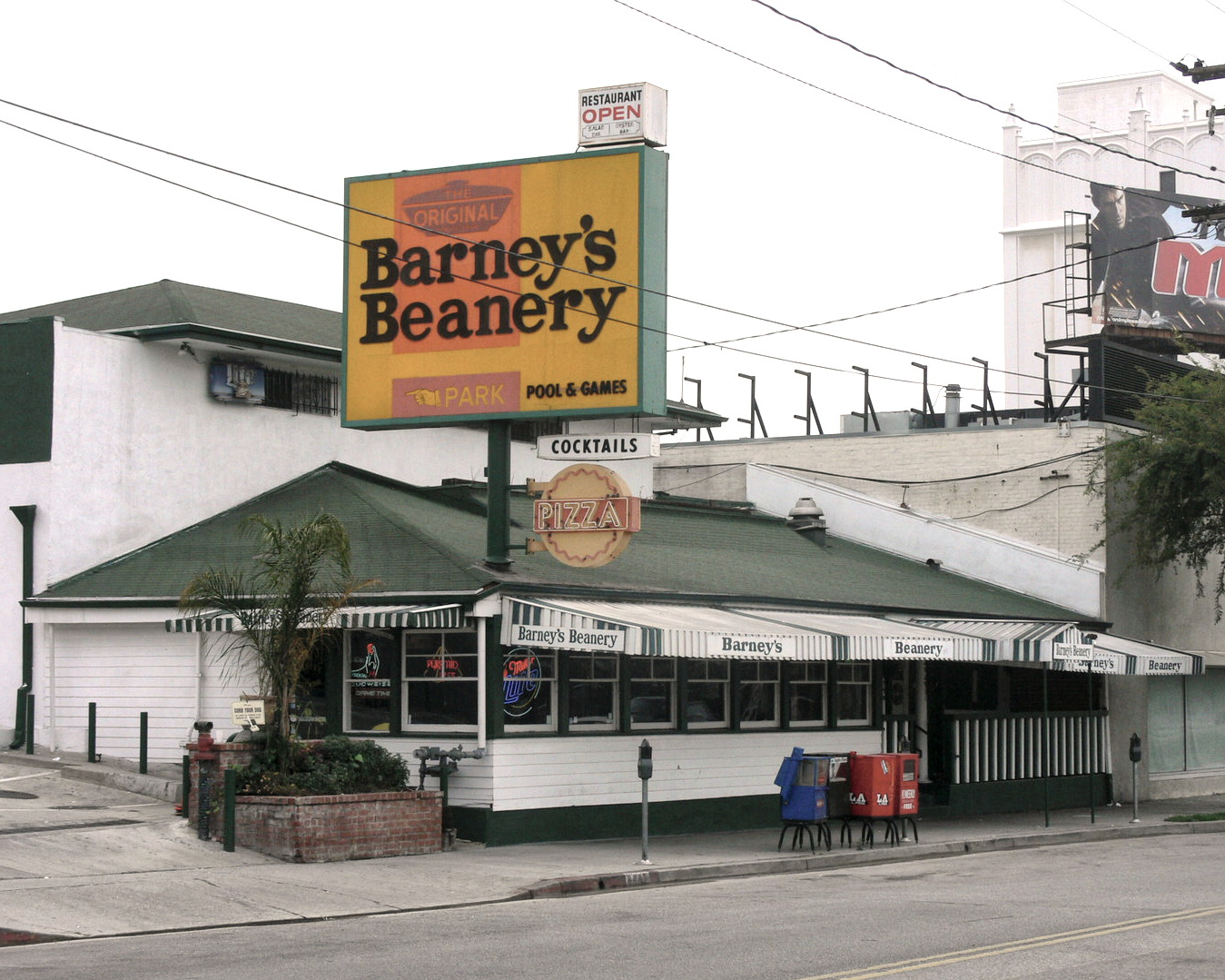
- Barney's Beanery location at 8447 Santa Monica Blvd, West Hollywood, CA
- Industry: Food
- Founded: 1920; 106 years ago in Berkeley, California
- Founder: John "Barney" Anthony
- Headquarters: West Hollywood, California, US
- Area served: United States
- Website: barneysbeanery.com

Barney's Beanery is a chain of gastropubs in the Greater Los Angeles Area. John "Barney" Anthony founded it in 1920 in Berkeley, California, and in 1927 he moved it to U.S. Route 66, now Santa Monica Boulevard (State Route 2), in West Hollywood. As of 2011, Barney's Beanery had locations in Burbank, Pasadena (taking the ground floor of Q's Billiards at 99 East Colorado Boulevard), Santa Monica, Westwood, Redondo Beach at the Redondo Beach Pier and the original in West Hollywood.

== History ==
Barney's relocation to West Hollywood, combined with the fact that the owner extended credit and occasionally gave away food, made the bar popular with people of diverse backgrounds, including artists, writers, and other celebrities. Older Hollywood actors such as Clara Bow, Clark Gable, Errol Flynn, Judy Garland and Rita Hayworth were all regulars in their day. By the 1960s, the neighboring Sunset Strip had become an important music center, and Jim Morrison (who was reportedly thrown out of Barney's for urinating on the bar) and Janis Joplin became regulars (Barney's was the final place Joplin visited before her death in October 1970). Poet Charles Bukowski hung around, as did artists Ed Kienholz and others associated with the Ferus Gallery, which was located nearby on La Cienega Boulevard. Quentin Tarantino also allegedly wrote most of the screenplay for his film Pulp Fiction sitting in his favorite booth at the original Barney's Beanery in West Hollywood. Jon Taffer got his start in the nightclub and bar industry here as a bartender while performing as a drummer in a live band.

=== Homophobia ===
"FAGOTS - STAY OUT"

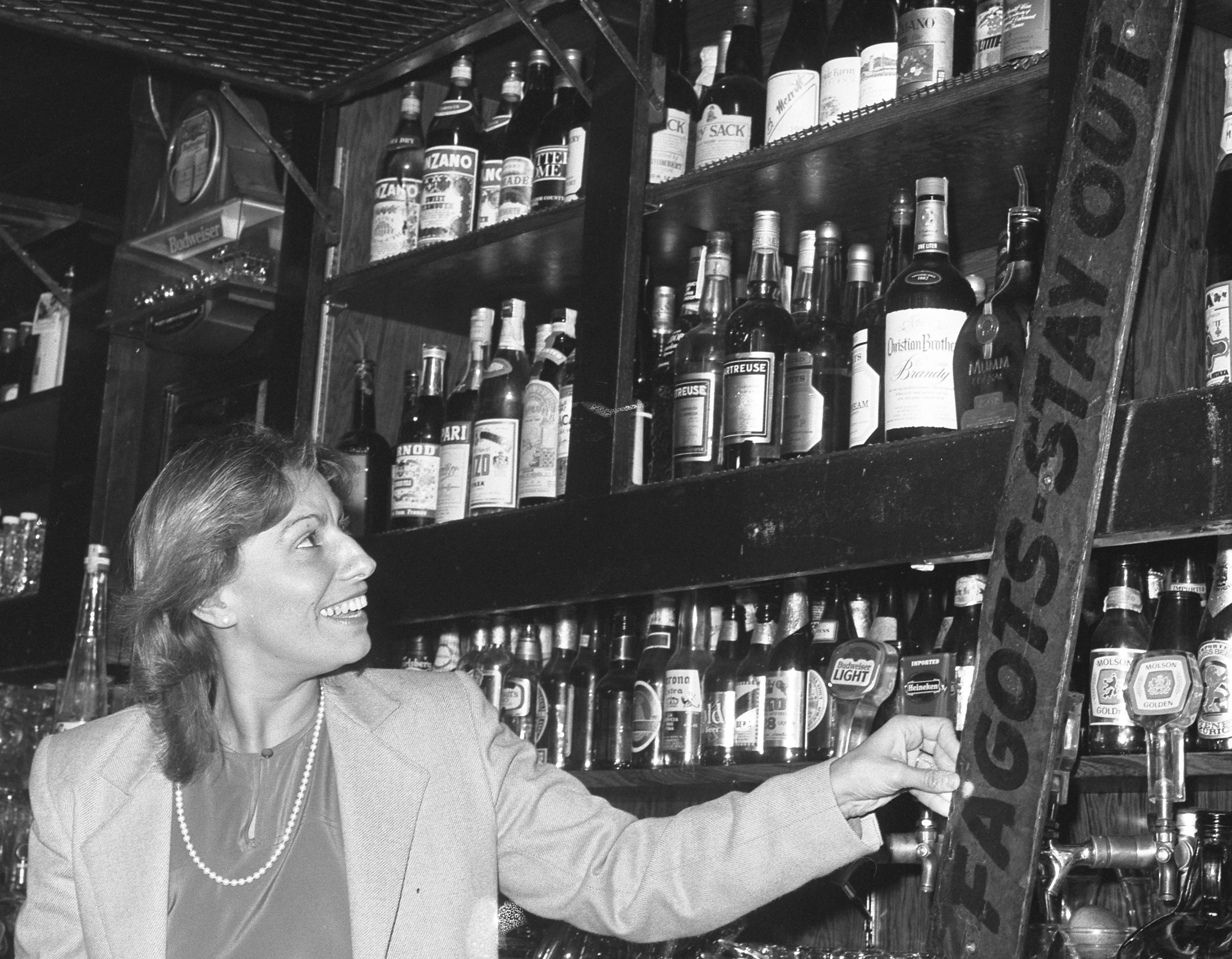
Mayor Valerie Terrigno removing the "Fagots Stay Out" sign in 1985

In the 1930s, 1940s, or around 1953 John Anthony put up a sign among the old license plates and other ephemera along the wall behind the bar that read "FAGOTS [sic] – STAY OUT". Though Anthony was known to be antagonistic towards gays, going as far as posing (in front of his sign) for a picture in a 1964 Life article on "Homosexuality in America" over a caption where he exclaims "I don't like 'em...", the sign ostensibly was put up as a response to pressure from the police who had a tendency towards discriminatory practices against gays and consequently establishments that catered to the group.

After Anthony died in 1968, efforts to remove the sign continued. A coalition of gay activist groups organized a zap of the restaurant on February 7, 1970, to push for its removal; the sign came down that day. The sign was put up and taken down several times over the next 14 years, and the restaurant's matchbooks also bore the line, but that practice ended in December 1984, days after the city of West Hollywood voted itself into existence. Then-mayor Valerie Terrigno, the entire city council and gay rights activists marched into Barney’s and relieved the wall of the offending sign. It was held by Morris Kight for many years and now rests in the ONE National Gay & Lesbian Archives.

== In pop culture ==
In 1965 Edward Kienholz created “The Beanery,” a life-size sculpture tableaux of the interior, inhabited by poorly dressed store mannequins whose “faces” are clocks set at 10:10. An audiotape of barroom chatter, and the odor of beer, accompanied the display. A newspaper in a vending machine is headlined "Children Kill Children in Vietnam.” The work was first unveiled in the restaurant parking lot, and is now in the Stedelijk Museum Amsterdam.

On the cover of the 1968 Big Brother and the Holding Company album Cheap Thrills, vibes on the song "Turtle Blues" are credited to Barney's Beanery. Also, there is an illustration of the diner by R. Crumb, who did the artwork for the album.

In the TV film series Columbo (1971–77; 1989–2003), Columbo often ordered chili at Barney's Beanery. However, the series was not filmed in the actual location.

Country rock band New Riders of the Purple Sage talk of hanging out at Barney's Beanery in their 1973 song Lonesome L.A. Cowboy.

Barney's Beanery appears in the opening credits of the 1978 film Grease.

In Brian DePalma's 1984 film Body Double, the main character, Jake, breaks his sobriety at Barney's after finding out his girlfriend is cheating on him.

Parts of Oliver Stone's 1991 film The Doors were filmed at Barney's Beanery.

== Gallery ==
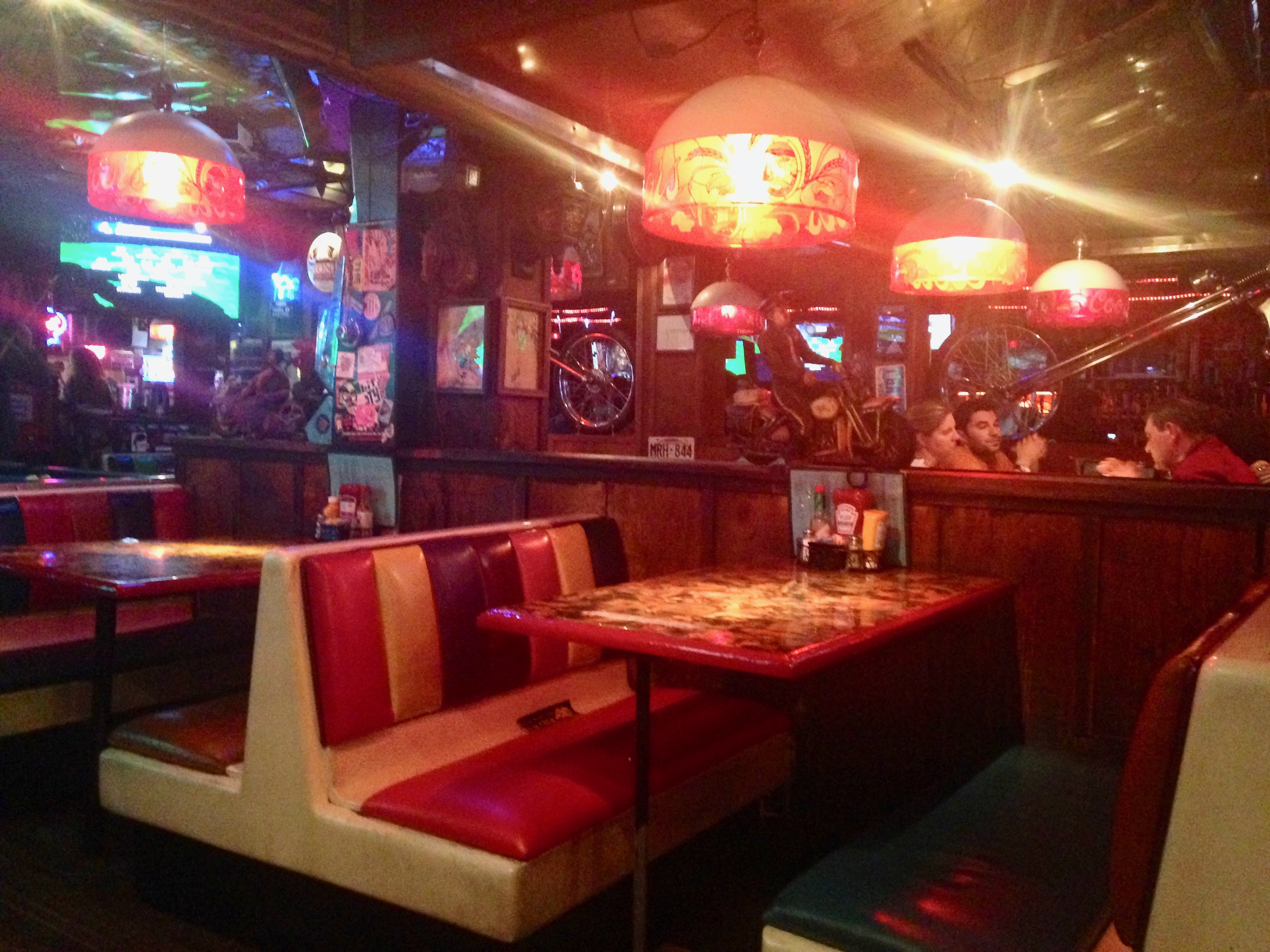
Inside Barney's Beanery

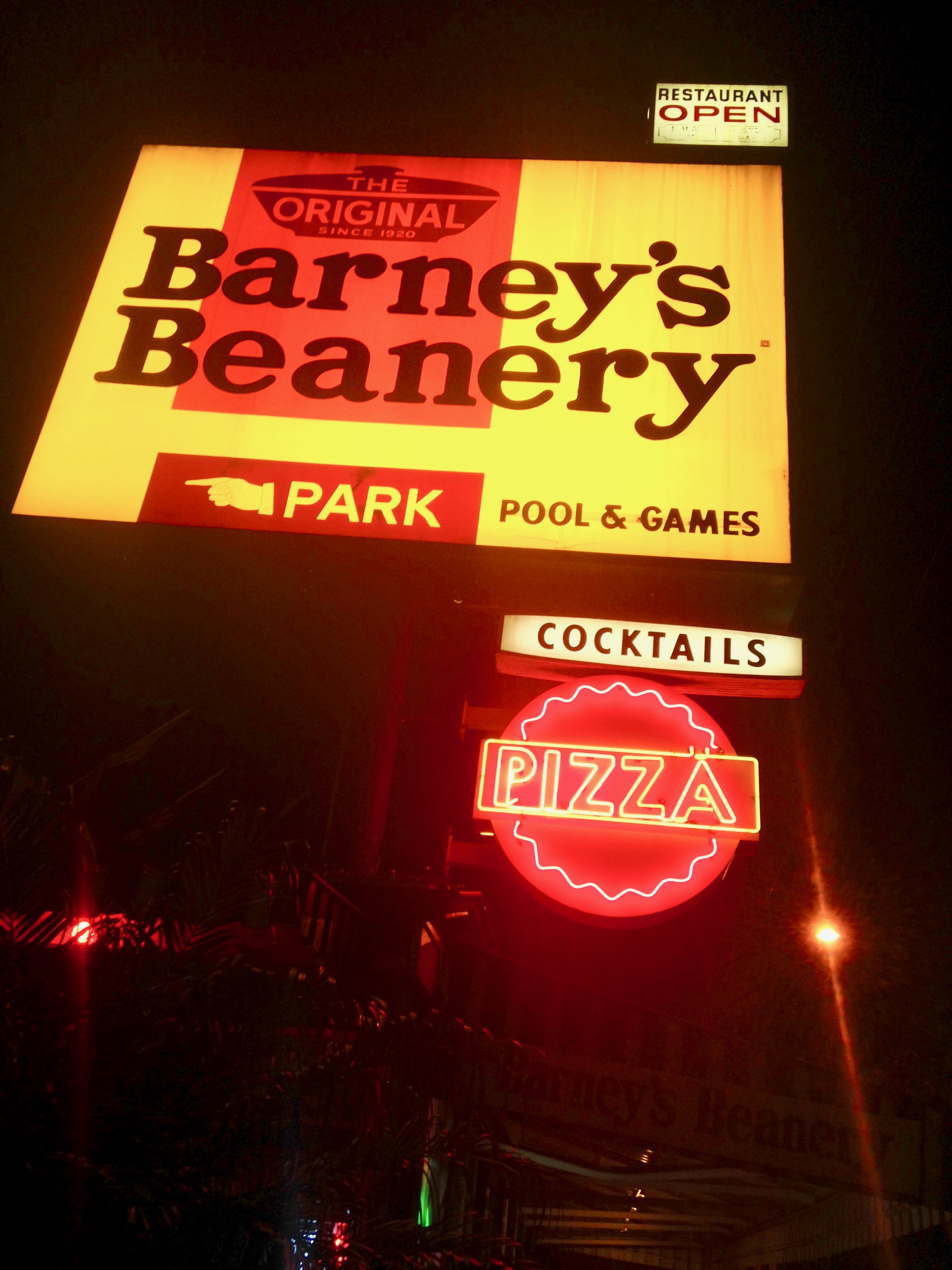
Barney's Beanery sign at night
