= Morris Kight =

American gay rights and peace activist (1919-2003)

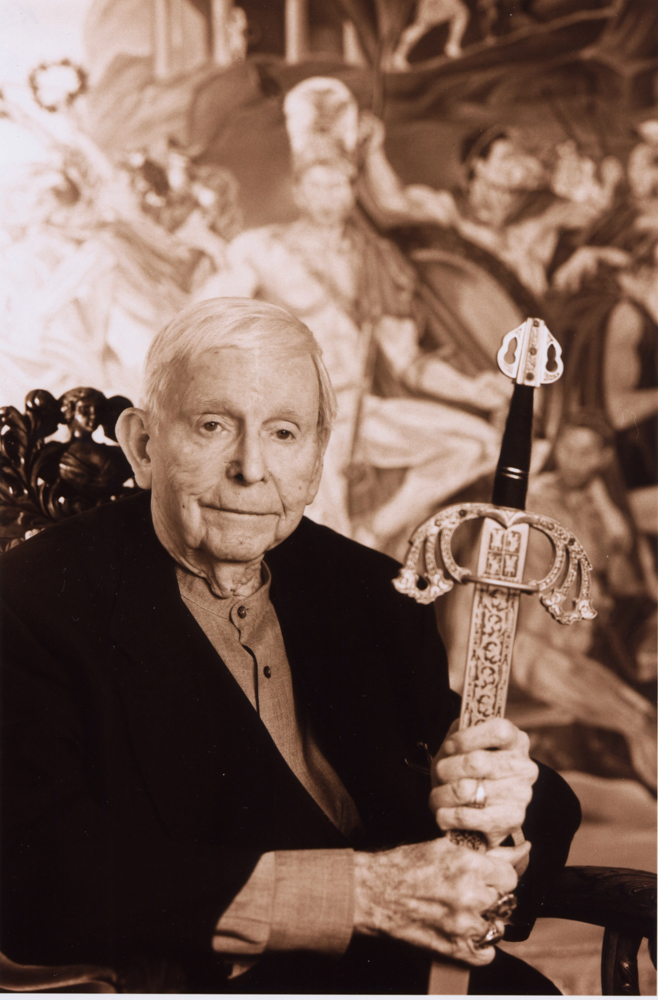
- Morris Kight. Portrait by Henning von Berg, 2002
- Born: November 19, 1919; Comanche County, Texas
- Died: January 19, 2003 (aged 83); Los Angeles, California
- Occupations: Gay rights pioneer, Peace activist
- Spouse: Roy Zucheran

Morris Kight (November 19, 1919 – January 19, 2003) was an American gay rights pioneer and peace activist. He is considered one of the original founders of the gay and lesbian civil rights movement in the United States.

== Biography ==
=== Early life ===
Kight was born and grew up in Comanche County, Texas. He graduated from Texas Christian University in 1941 with a degree in personnel administration and public administration.

From 1941 until 1958, Kight lived in northern New Mexico, where he and many other gay people were active in Adlai Stevenson's campaign in the 1952 presidential election. The presence of many gay people in Stevenson's campaign led to the spreading of a rumor that Stevenson was gay.

While in New Mexico, Kight married and had two daughters, Carol Kight-Fyfe and Angela Chandler. He only shared that information with his closest friends, apparently believing that would diminish his credibility as a spokesman for gay rights.

Kight also acted while he was in Albuquerque. From 1950 to 1955, he was involved in the "Summerhouse Theater" and the "Old Town Players" in Albuquerque. The two companies brought in many actors from California, and Kight was able to read some of the new "homophile" organizations' pamphlets and circulations that these actors brought with them. This was his first exposure to groups such as the Mattachine Society, which he considered elitist.

=== Labor and civil rights activities ===
Kight was active in many political, civil rights, and labor rights groups. As early as the 1940s, he was involved in organizing the Oil, Chemical and Atomic Workers International Union. After moving to Los Angeles, he kept up his involvement in varied rights groups. This work led to the first protest groups he himself founded: the "Dow Action Committee" in 1967. The Committee protested the chemical company, including its production of Agent Orange and its use, during the Vietnam War.

Kight's strong beliefs sometimes put him at odds with members of the gay community. In 1977, Kight began what became a national Coors boycott to expose how the Coors Brewing Company used its millions to finance union busting legislation and anti-gay politicians. Morris infuriated organizers of Outfest the year the festival accepted Coors funding. He organized a demonstration in front of the event, using the opportunity to educate the community about the ways anti-gay corporations try to clean up their public image by funding cash-starved gay organizations and events.

Morris persevered and Outfest no longer accepts Coors funding.

=== Gay rights activities ===
In 1958, Kight moved to Los Angeles, where he was the founder or co-founder of many gay and lesbian organizations. The first such organization was the 'militant' Committee for Homosexual Freedom or CHF, with Leo Laurence, Gale Whittington, Mother Boats and others, later to be renamed the Gay Liberation Front (GLF) in October 1969, the third GLF in the country (after New York City and Berkeley). The name was used to show solidarity with the Vietnamese National Liberation Front. By the next year, there were over 350 GLF organizations around the country.

He also co-founded Christopher Street West gay pride parade in Los Angeles in 1970, Aid For AIDS in 1983, and the Gay Community Center in 1971, (now the Los Angeles Gay and Lesbian Center), the Stonewall Democratic Club in 1975, and many others. Kight remarked that creating the Community Center was the achievement of which he was most proud. In addition, he hosted the first Asian/Pacific Gays and Friends meetings in his home.

Kight brought his experiences in political action into the realm of gay rights. One of the first actions by the LA GLF was against a local eatery called Barney's Beanery. The restaurant, located in West Hollywood, not only had a sign above the bar that said "Fagots [sic] Stay Out", but also printed up matchbook covers with the same saying. Kight, along with Troy Perry and 100 activists, protested outside, sending in protesters occasionally to order coffee and take up space at the tables. The protest was initially successful - the owner eventually handed Kight the sign in front of news cameras. But after the media left the owner replaced the sign, where it remained until West Hollywood's first lesbian mayor, Valerie Terrigno, took it down when the city council passed an anti-discrimination ordinance. Perry vowed at the initial protest to never set foot in the place again until the owner apologized, which finally happened in 2005. The new owner, David Houston, not only apologized but, among other methods to reach out to the gay community, holds monthly lunches for disadvantaged gay youth.

Kight was one of the leaders of the 1987 Second National March on Washington for Lesbian and Gay Rights. He was subsequently one of the organizers of the 1988 March on Sacramento for Lesbian and Gay Rights, at which Leonard Matlovich gave his last public speech. Kight served on the Los Angeles County Human Relations Commission for two decades.

In 2003 the City of Los Angeles dedicated the corner of Hollywood Boulevard and McCadden Place, in Hollywood, as "Morris Kight Square." This location was selected as it was the stepping off point for Christopher Street West, the very first street-closing gay pride parade in the world.

=== Twilight years ===
Toward the end of his life, Kight had several strokes that slowed him down.

On November 16, 1998, just before his 79th birthday, the City Council of West Hollywood presented him a Lifetime Achievement Award.

In September 2001 he made a video documentary with West Hollywood Public Access host James Fuhrman, called "Early Gay and Lesbian History in Los Angeles", which included his recollections of the Barney's Beanery protest and other actions.

He had a longtime companion named Roy Zucheran.

Three days before his death, he donated his memorabilia and archives to the National Gay and Lesbian Archives in Los Angeles. UCLA also has possession of some of his archives.

He died peacefully at the Carl Bean Hospice in Los Angeles, on January 19, 2003.

== Legacy ==
Season 3, episode 8 of the podcast “Making Gay History” is about Morris Kight.

The Christopher Street West/Los Angeles Gay Pride Morris Kight Lifetime Achievement Award was first given out in 2003.

There is a Chinese magnolia tree and a bronze plaque dedicated to him at the Matthew Shepard Triangle in West Hollywood. Kight used to visit this park weekly to tidy up the area, water and plant new flowers. He encouraged others to do the same.
