= Nancy Reddin Kienholz =

American artist (1943–2019)

- Born: Nancy Reddin; December 9, 1943; Los Angeles, California
- Died: August 7, 2019 (aged 75); Houston, Texas
- Education: Self-taught
- Known for: Photography, installation art, mixed media

Nancy Reddin Kienholz (December 9, 1943 – August 7, 2019) was an American mixed media artist based in Hope, Idaho. She worked in installation art, assemblage, photography, and lenticular printing. She was most famous for her collaborations with her husband and creative partner Edward Kienholz, from their meeting in 1972 until his sudden death in 1994. She continued to produce her own artworks for the rest of her life.

== Early life ==
Reddin was born in Los Angeles, California, in 1943. Her father, Thomas Reddin (1916 – 2004) was born in New York City and worked in Los Angeles as a police officer; he would eventually serve as chief of the Los Angeles Police Department from 1967 to 1969 and appear on the cover of Time magazine in July 1968. Her mother, real estate broker Betty Parsons Reddin (b. 1921), was born in Denver, Colorado. Nancy was the youngest of three children, born after older brothers Thomas T. Reddin (1938 – 1985) and Michael Gray Reddin (b. 1942).

Reddin was first married at age 19. She had one child from this marriage, Christine, in 1964, but the marriage ended after two years. Reddin received no formal training in art, and worked several odd jobs in Los Angeles before beginning her collaborations with Ed Kienholz in 1972.

== Second marriage and collaboration ==
Reddin met Ed Kienholz at a party in Los Angeles in 1972. At that time, Kienholz was already an established artist, being a founding member of the Ferus Gallery and a long-standing participant in the Los Angeles avant garde scene. He had full custody of two children, Jenny and Noah, from one of his four previous marriages, and would later legally adopt Reddin's daughter Christine.

Reddin and Kienholz began their creative collaborations the same year they met. Their first work together was The Middle Islands No. 1, now in the collection of the Louisiana Museum of Modern Art in Humlebæk, Denmark. Ed Kienholz continued to receive sole credit for these collaborations until 1981, when he publicly announced for the first time that all works after 1972 should be retroactively credited instead to "Kienholz", in collective reference to both Ed and Nancy.

In 1973, Kienholz received a grant from DAAD to work in the Federal Republic of Germany. The couple sold their house in Los Angeles, and Reddin moved with Kienholz and their children to West Berlin. The entire family, including the children, contributed to the creation of the exhibit Kienholz created using the grant. Reddin and Kienholz would divide their time between Berlin and their home in the rural Idaho Panhandle until Edward Kienholz's sudden death in 1994.

During their marriage, Reddin and Kienholz worked prolifically, primarily in installation art. They maintained studios in Berlin and in Hope, Idaho. Kienholz received a Guggenheim Fellowship in 1976, and their work was especially critically acclaimed in Europe.

After struggling with diabetes for years, Edward Kienholz died suddenly in 1994 of a massive heart attack in Sandpoint, Idaho. He was buried in a 1940 Packard automobile, which Reddin steered into the gravesite.

== Later work and death ==
In addition to maintaining Kienholz's estate, Reddin continued to work in multiple media during the decades after 1994. She organized and consulted on several major exhibitions of their collaborative work, as well as solo exhibitions of artworks she created after the death of her husband.

In addition to continuing her work in assemblage sculpture, Reddin returned to an early interest in photography and created several works using lenticular images.

Reddin died on August 7, 2019, in Houston, aged 75.
