= The Beanery =

1965 art installation by Edward Kienholz

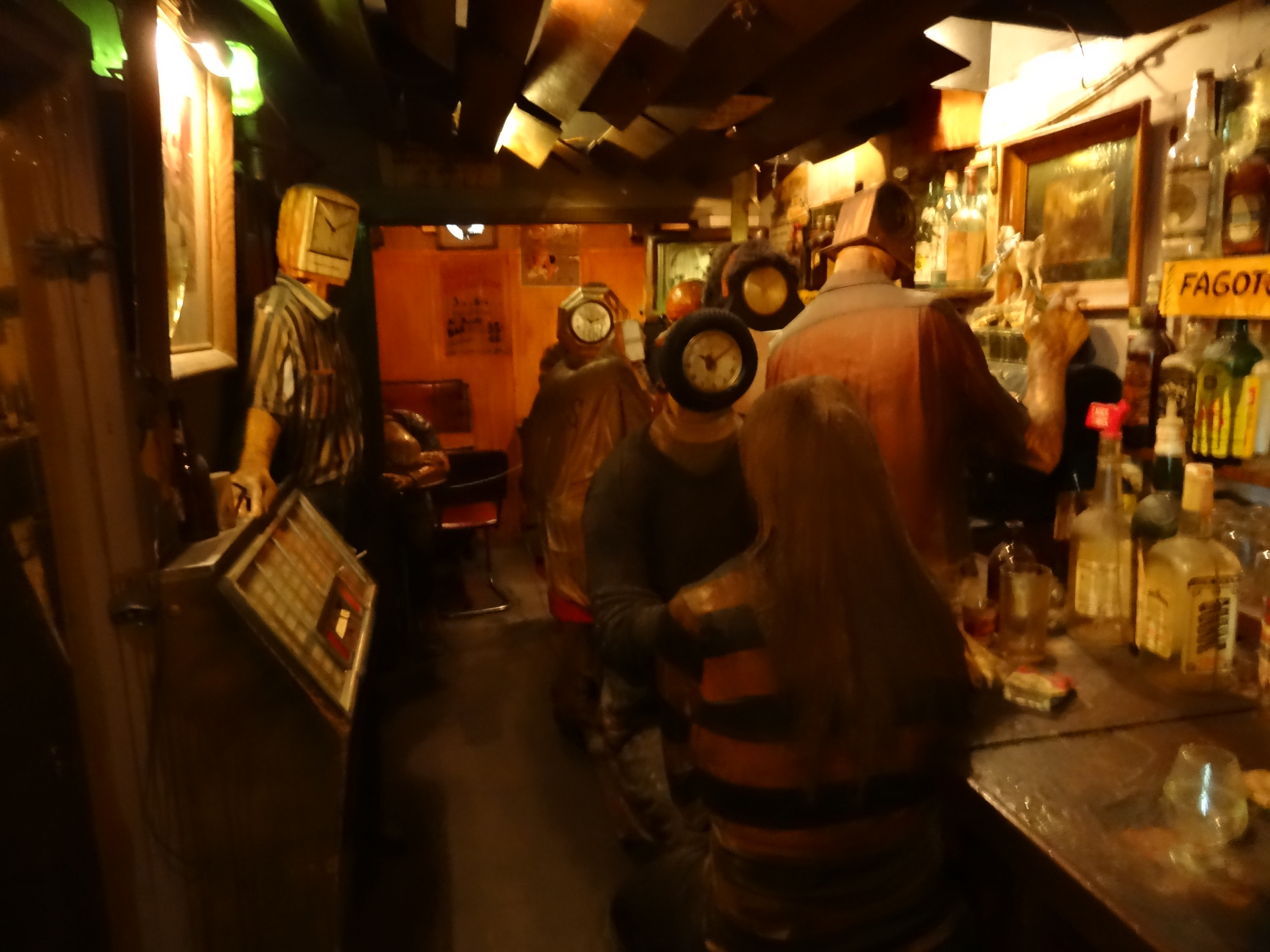
Interior view of The Beanery

The Beanery is a life-size, walk-in artwork created in 1965 by the American artist Edward Kienholz; it has been referred to as his greatest work, and "one of the most memorable works of late 20th-century art". It represents the interior of a Los Angeles bar, Barney's Beanery.

The Beanery has dimensions of 253 by 670 by 190 centimeters, having been modelled at two-thirds the size of the original Beanery. It features the smells (created using bacon grease, urine, mothballs, and beer) and sounds (including glasses clinking, people talking and laughing, and so on) of the bar, and models of customers, all of whom have clocks for faces with the time set at 10:10. Only the model of Barney, the owner, has a real face. There are seventeen figures in the bar overall. Outside of the bar is a newspaper which reads, "Children Kill Children in Vietnam".

First exhibited in the parking lot of the bar in October 1965, it is now in the Stedelijk Museum Amsterdam. It was restored in 2012.

Because viewers are able to go into the artwork, people may accidentally damage elements of the work. Much of the damage that has been sustained over time to the work has been at the height of people's hands. For example, a dog in the work now has some of its fur missing.

== Interpretation ==
Kienholz is quoted as saying "The entire work symbolizes the switch from real time (symbolized by a newspaper) to the surrealist time inside the bar, where people waste time, kill time, forget time, and ignore time". He also said that his goal with the Beanery was to create artwork that was more approachable and easier for the viewer to have an experience with.
