= Asian/Pacific Gays and Friends =

American nonprofit organization

Asian/Pacific Gays and Friends (A/PGF)
- Formation: 1980; 46 years ago
- Founders: Morris Kight; Paul Chen; June Lagmay; Tak Yamamoto; Dean Goishi; Doug Chin; Roy Kawasaki; Terry Gock
- Founded at: Los Angeles, California, USA
- Legal status: Nonprofit organization
- Headquarters: West Hollywood, California, USA
- President: Rummel Mor Bautista
- Vice President: Skip Ober Miller
- Award: 2019 Rainbow Key Awards
- Website: https://www.apgf.org/
- Formerly called: Asian/Pacific Lesbian and Gays (A/PLG)

Asian/Pacific Gays and Friends (A/PGF) is a nonprofit social and cultural organization founded in late 1980. Formerly known as Asian/Pacific Lesbians and Gays (A/PLG), the formation of the panethnic organization supported the nascent community of queer Asian American individuals and their allies in Los Angeles, California through monthly meetings, cultural workshops, and retreats. While numerous similar groups convened after 1980, A/PGF played a pivotal role in the self-identification of a gay Asian-American community in Southern California. As the oldest active organization of its kind, A/PGF continues to host monthly social programming including meals, screenings, and outings for its members.

== Background ==
Prior to the establishment of A/PLG, the cultural invisibility of homosexuality among Asian-American immigrants made it difficult to bring forth solidarity and organization within the community. Reinforced by racial hierarchies of desire, where white-Asian coupling was deemed the relational archetype, intraracial dynamics between gay Asians were further strained by notions of sexual competition and rigid masculine-feminine binaries. While "rice bars" lacked the social and political agency brought about by A/PLG, establishments such as Mugi's in East Hollywood and River Club in Los Feliz served as critical sites of assembly for gay Asians before formal organizations like A/PLG. These bars, however, were not absent of the sexual hierarchies that rendered the self-identification of a panethnic gay community difficult: Frequented by rice queens who sought out Asians as sexual subjects, these sites of assembly reflected the broader struggle of Asian-Americans against reductive stereotypes and discriminatory body politics. Yet, the formation of A/PLG was accelerated through these collective spaces by the heightened visibility of gay Asian-American individuals to each other.

== Early years ==
Morris Kight, who is widely recognized a pioneer of the gay civil rights movement, convened the first meeting of Asian/Pacific Lesbian and Gays in his home. The political activist was also motivated by personal reasons beyond his strong advocacy: Kight aimed to form an Asian community for his Japanese American partner, Roy. Kight was instrumental to the establishment of A/PLG, hosting the first formative meetings of the organization.

As an alternative to bars, restaurants, and bathhouses, A/PLG provided an environment for gay and lesbian Asian-Americans to congregate and converse away from the appeals of cruising, smoking, and drinking. Paul Chen, a graduate student at UCLA, and June Lagmay were recruited by Kight to be the founding co-chairs of the organization. After a few months, Paul Chen resigned from his position as co-chair, leaving the opportunity to create a formalized leadership board: Tak Yamamoto was elected as the organization's first president, Dean Goishi assumed the role of membership chair, and Doug Chin served as the treasurer. As a major component of A/PLG's early outreach efforts, the monthly newsletter written by the organization's leadership engaged members with the broader Asian-American and gay communities, and informed the general body of current events on both national and global scales.

The organization's first retreat in Big Bear was coordinated by Yamamoto in collaboration with Dr. Terry Gock, a postdoctorate psychology fellow at the University of Southern California. Gock was introduced to A/PLG through Paul Chen, and became invested in the idea of a retreat as the instigator of self-identification for gay Asian-Americans. For two and a half days, Gock led the first board of directors and other members in exercises centered around sexuality, coming out, and self-image. In response to the widespread subjugation of panethnic Asian identities within the dominant paradigm of American sexuality, Gock challenged the early members of A/PLG to reconcile with and confront their socialization as sexual subjects of the white male gaze.

=== AIDS epidemic ===
By the mid-1980s, the AIDS epidemic propelled A/PLG into political action in response to the widespread tragedies that were occurring throughout the community. Whereas the organization held minimal political agency and served mainly as a space for meeting other gay Asians in its early years, A/PLG created an HIV/AIDS committee to care for HIV-positive gay Asians who lacked the support system due to the internalized and externalized stigma against the disease. In developing from a committee within A/PLG to a full-fledged agency, the Asian Pacific AIDS Intervention Team received funding from grants and donors. Its benefactors included the California Community Foundation and Special Services for Groups.

=== Interracial and intraracial challenges ===
From the outset, non-Asian, white Americans actively participated in A/PLG. Although the presence of white Americans consisted mainly of rice queens and the partners of gay Asians who played a critical role in the organizing of A/PLG, their involvement in leadership was a contested issue as the organization continued to grow.

== Offshoot organizations ==
Various groups split off from the Asian/Pacific Lesbians and Gays, such as the Los Angeles Asian/Pacific Islander Sisters (LAAPIS), which was formed by a group of women. Before disbanding in 1999 due to a decline in participation, LAAPIS focused more on outreach within AAPI communities than in white gay spaces and provided a space for lesbian and bisexual AAPI women independent from established communities in West Hollywood.
