= The Illegal Operation (sculpture) =

1962 assemblage by Ed Keinholz

- Artist: Edward Kienholz
- Year: 1962
- Location: Los Angeles County Museum of Art

The Illegal Operation is the title of a grotesque 1962 assemblage sculpture by the American artist Edward Kienholz about unsafe abortion. The title refers to the euphemism illegal operation, which was then in widespread use to describe induced-abortion procedures.

Per the Los Angeles Times, "Abortion was a crime, and the wretched back-alley procedure that the artist witnessed his wife endure was fresh in his mind. (She survived.)" The artwork "depicts a makeshift operating room strewn with bedpans, rusty medical instruments, and dirty rags. There is no body in this scene, only a ripped sack of cement, its contents spilling onto a chair through an oozing gash." The artwork is amongst "a handful of Kienholz's most important assemblages" and is considered representative of the "dramatic shift in the long-contentious abortion debate" that took place in the 1960s.
