= Valerie Terrigno =

Former West Hollywood mayor

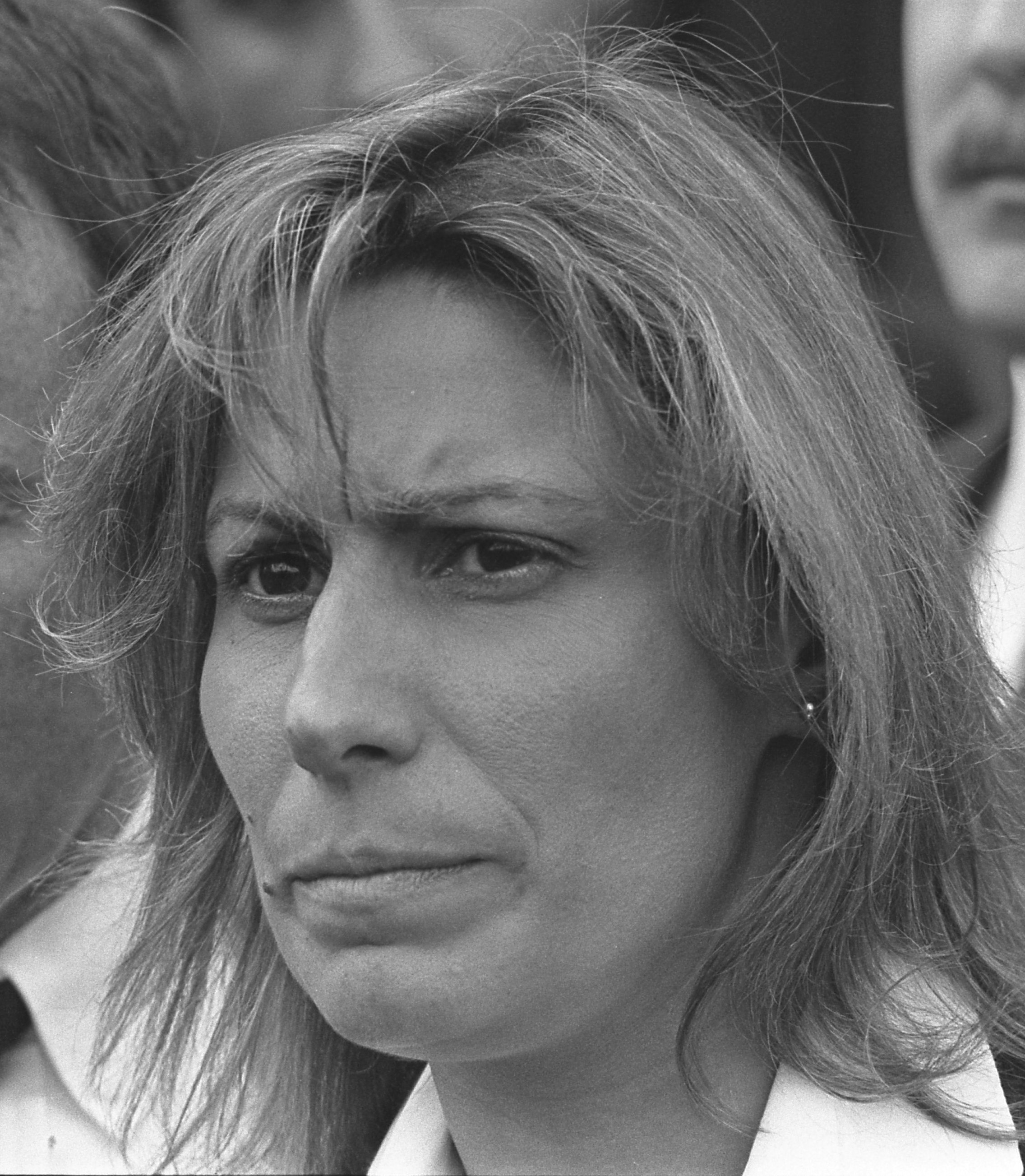
- Terrigno in 1986

Mayor of West Hollywood
- In office November 29, 1984 – May 3, 1986

Personal details
- Born: Valerie Susan Terrigno; 1954 (age 70–71); Bronx, New York, USA

Valerie Susan Terrigno (/tɛriːnoʊ/; born 1954) is a former mayor of West Hollywood, California. She was elected to the city council in 1984 and became mayor not long after. She was the first lesbian mayor of an incorporated municipality in the United States.

== Early life ==
Terrigno grew up in the Bronx, the oldest of five children. The family moved to Neptune, New Jersey in 1966. Terrigno graduated second in her class from Neptune High School, then attended Hofstra University on a scholarship. She transferred to University of California, Los Angeles where she studied psychology but later dropped out. She then took courses for a therapy license at biofeedback clinic New Health Institute.

== Career ==
In May 1982, she became director of Crossroads Counseling Center, an agency for the poor and homeless in West Hollywood. This job required a college degree; it was later revealed that Terrigno's resume falsely stated she graduated with a Bachelor's from UCLA and had started graduate school.

During her time as mayor, the council passed a strong rent-control law and began offering domestic partnership benefits, becoming the second American city to legally recognize same-sex relationships (Berkeley had passed a similar law a year earlier). Her best-known action as mayor was, after the city council passed an anti-discrimination ordinance, taking down a controversial anti-gay sign, "Fagots [sic] Stay Out," at local landmark restaurant Barney's Beanery.

=== Embezzlement charges ===
After serving for one year as mayor of the city, a largely ceremonial position that rotated annually among the members of the city council, Terrigno was convicted in 1986 of embezzling and misappropriating $9,000 in federal grant funds during her time at Crossroads. On the witness stand, Terrigno acknowledged making "errors in judgment" but denied any criminal wrongdoing. Former friends, colleagues, and significant others testified against her. Federal District Judge Laughlin Waters sentenced Terrigno to sixty days, which she served in a halfway house. Terrigno claimed that she was targeted for being lesbian, but jurors denied that sexual orientation was a factor.

Terrigno resigned her city council seat in 1986 after coming under investigation. When she resigned, city officials awarded her with four plaques honoring her work in organizing West Hollywood.

Terrigno's planned appearance at the 1986 West Hollywood gay pride parade, representing a local restaurant, sparked controversy. Parade organizers were prepared to bar her from participating but she voluntarily withdrew. Longtime gay activist Harry Hay, angered at what he believed was unfair treatment, walked the parade route with a sign reading "Valerie Terrigno walks with me".
