= Hope, Idaho =

- City
- Location of Hope in Bonner County, Idaho.
- Coordinates: 48°15′12″N 116°18′25″W
- Country: United States
- State: Idaho
- County: Bonner

Area
  - Total: 0.47 sq mi (1.22 km^{2})
  - Land: 0.46 sq mi (1.19 km^{2})
  - Water: 0.012 sq mi (0.03 km^{2})
- Elevation: 2,431 ft (741 m)

Population (2020)
  - Total: 98
  - Density: 210/sq mi (82/km^{2})
- Time zone: UTC-8 (Pacific (PST))
  - Summer (DST): UTC-7 (PDT)
- ZIP code: 83836
- Area codes: 208, 986
- FIPS code: 16-38440
- GNIS feature ID: 2410791
- Website: hope-idaho.org

Hope is a city in Bonner County, Idaho, United States. The population was 98 at the 2020 census.

== Geography ==
Hope is located on the northeast shore of Lake Pend Oreille.

According to the United States Census Bureau, the city has a total area of 0.52 square miles (1.35 km^{2}), of which, 0.47 square miles (1.22 km^{2}) is land and 0.05 square miles (0.13 km^{2}) is water.

== Demographics ==
Historical population
Census	Pop.	Note	%±
1910	215		—
1920	160		−25.6%
1930	111		−30.6%
1940	116		4.5%
1950	111		−4.3%
1960	96		−13.5%
1970	63		−34.4%
1980	106		68.3%
1990	99		−6.6%
2000	79		−20.2%
2010	86		8.9%
2020	98		14.0%
U.S. Decennial Census

=== 2010 census ===
As of the census of 2010, there were 86 people, 34 households, and 26 families living in the city. The population density was 183.0 inhabitants per square mile (70.7/km^{2}). There were 59 housing units at an average density of 125.5 per square mile (48.5/km^{2}). The racial makeup of the city was 98.8% White and 1.2% from two or more races.

There were 34 households, of which 35.3% had children under the age of 18 living with them, 61.8% were married couples living together, 8.8% had a female householder with no husband present, 5.9% had a male householder with no wife present, and 23.5% were non-families. 20.6% of all households were made up of individuals, and 2.9% had someone living alone who was 65 years of age or older. The average household size was 2.53 and the average family size was 2.77.

The median age in the city was 47 years. 22.1% of residents were under the age of 18; 12.8% were between the ages of 18 and 24; 13.9% were from 25 to 44; 38.3% were from 45 to 64; and 12.8% were 65 years of age or older. The gender makeup of the city was 51.2% male and 48.8% female.

=== 2000 census ===
As of the census of 2000, there were 79 people, 34 households, and 24 families living in the city. The population density was 197.0 inhabitants per square mile (76.1/km^{2}). There were 57 housing units at an average density of 142.1 per square mile (54.9/km^{2}). The racial makeup of the city was 100.00% White.

There were 34 households, out of which 29.4% had children under the age of 18 living with them, 64.7% were married couples living together, 2.9% had a female householder with no husband present, and 29.4% were non-families. 23.5% of all households were made up of individuals, and 8.8% had someone living alone who was 65 years of age or older. The average household size was 2.32 and the average family size was 2.75.

In the city, the population was spread out, with 21.5% under the age of 18, 7.6% from 18 to 24, 22.8% from 25 to 44, 36.7% from 45 to 64, and 11.4% who were 65 years of age or older. The median age was 44 years. For every 100 females, there were 97.5 males. For every 100 females age 18 and over, there were 106.7 males.

The median income for a household in the city was $24,500, and the median income for a family was $26,875. Males had a median income of $50,833 versus $31,250 for females. The per capita income for the city was $19,468. There were no families and 5.1% of the population living below the poverty line, including none under 18 and none of those over 64.

== Popular culture ==
The town is mentioned in the 2009 video game Prototype as a town which was used by the government to test a virus. The virus mutated and killed the entire population except two survivors who were captured by the military to serve as test subjects.

The town was a lifetime home for artist Edward Kienholz.

== See also ==
- List of cities in Idaho
