= Edward Kienholz =

American artist (1927–1994)

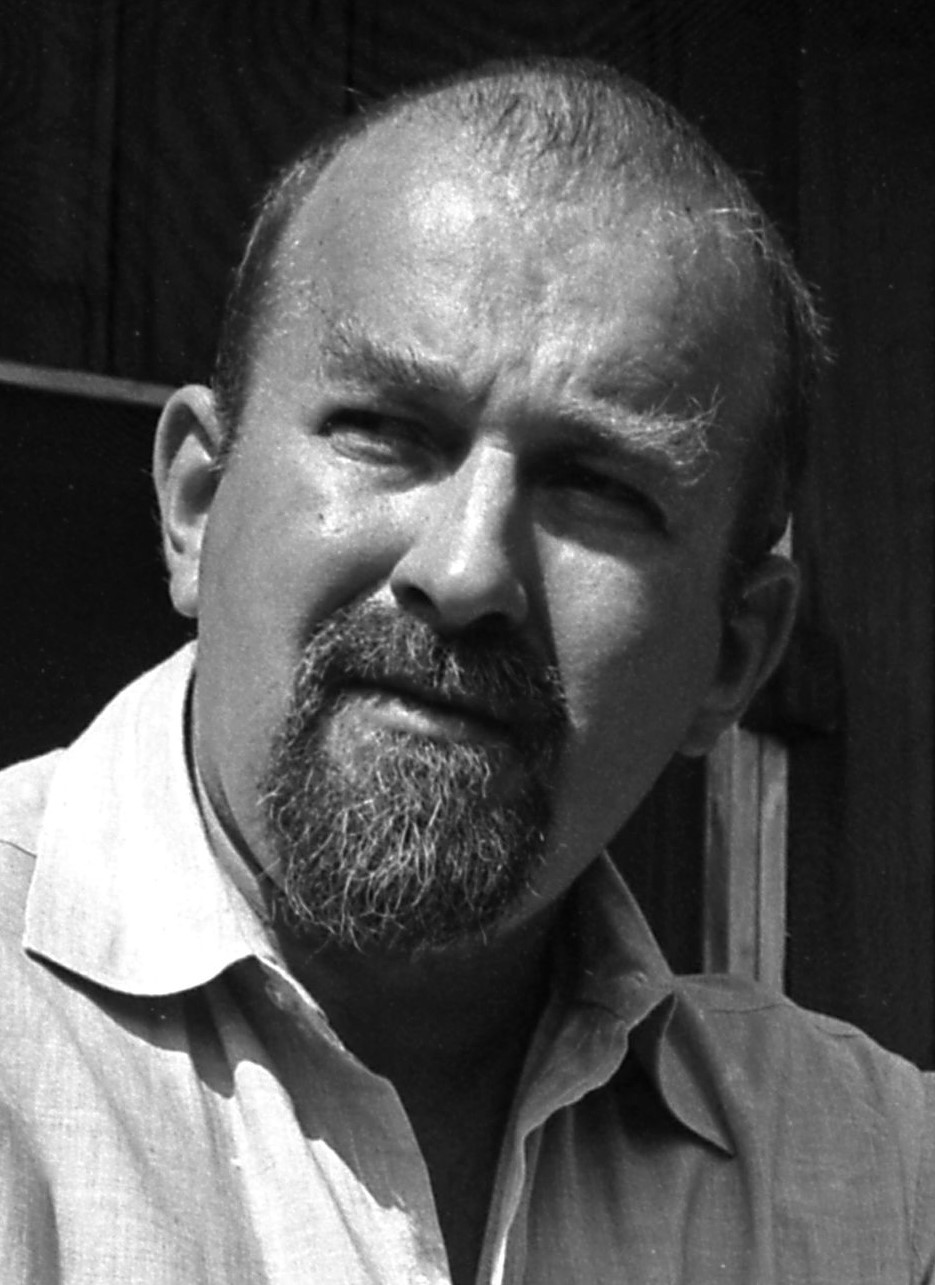
- Kienholz in 1965
- Born: Edward Ralph Kienholz; October 23, 1927; Fairfield, Washington, US
- Died: June 10, 1994 (aged 66); Hope, Idaho, US
- Education: Eastern Washington College of Education; Whitworth College "Self-taught"
- Known for: Installation art Assemblage
- Notable work: Roxy's (1961); The Illegal Operation (1962); Back Seat Dodge ’38 (1964); The Wait (1964-65); The Beanery (1965); The State Hospital (1966); Five Car Stud (1972)
- Movement: Funk art
- Awards: Guggenheim Fellowship (1976)

Edward Ralph Kienholz (October 23, 1927 – June 10, 1994) was an American installation artist and assemblage sculptor whose work was highly critical of aspects of modern life. From 1972 onwards, he assembled much of his artwork in close collaboration with his artistic partner and fifth wife, Nancy Reddin Kienholz. Throughout much of their career, the work of the Kienholzes was more appreciated in Europe than in their native United States, though American museums have featured their art more prominently since the 1990s.

Art critic Brian Sewell called Edward Kienholz "the least known, most neglected and forgotten American artist of Jack Kerouac's Beat Generation of the 1950s, a contemporary of the writers Allen Ginsberg, William Burroughs and Norman Mailer, his visual imagery at least as grim, gritty, sordid and depressing as their literary vocabulary".

== Early life ==
Sollie 17, mixed media construction by Edward Kienholz and Nancy Reddin Kienholz (1979-80, Smithsonian American Art Museum)

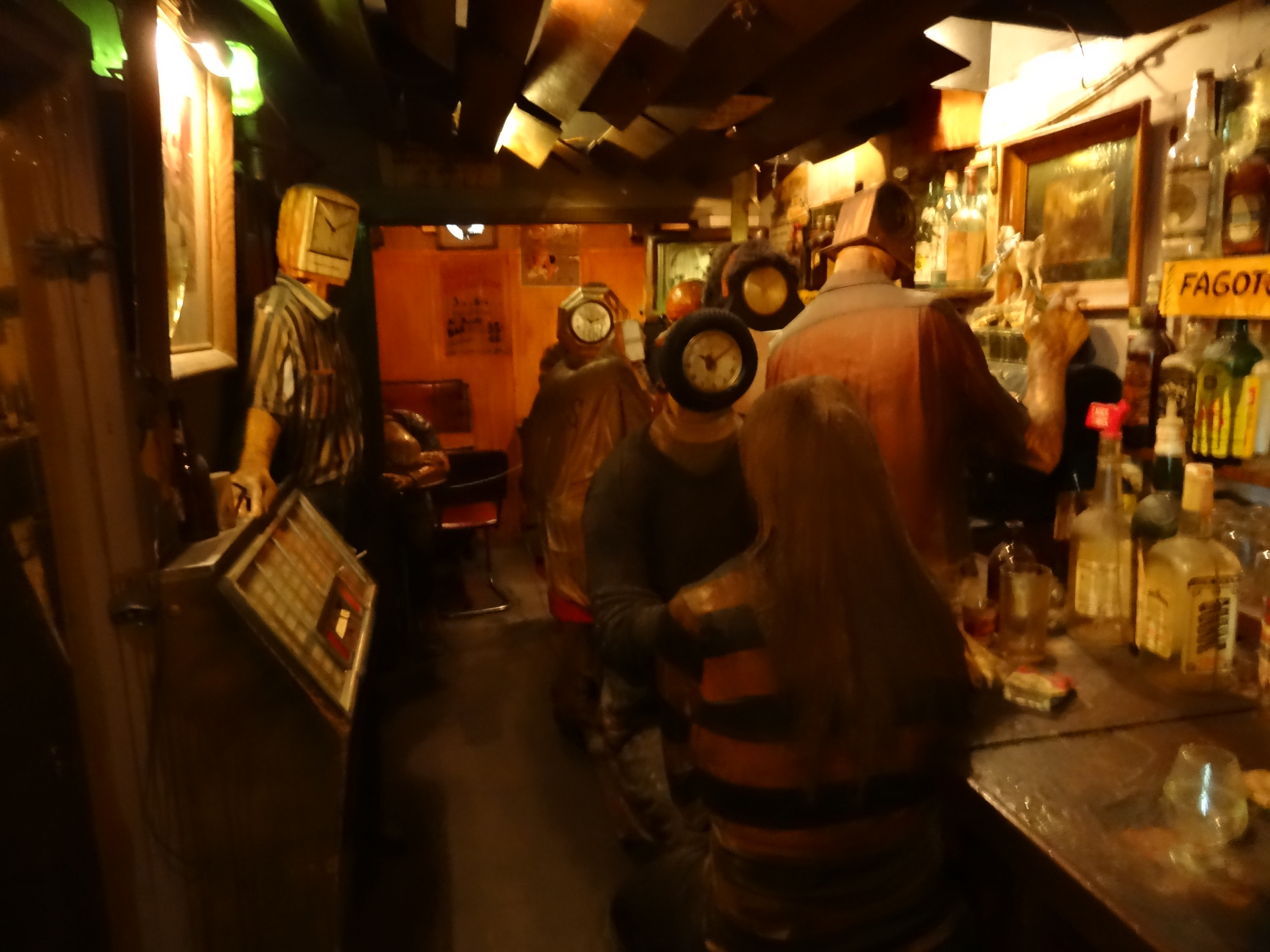
Interior view of The Beanery (1965, restored 2012; Stedelijk Museum Amsterdam, 2013 photo)

Edward Ralph Kienholz was born in Fairfield, Washington, in the dry eastern part of the state. He grew up on a wheat farm, learning carpentry, drafting, and mechanical skills. His father was strict, and his mother was a religious fundamentalist; the rebellious son longed to escape this constricted environment. He studied art at Eastern Washington College of Education and briefly, at Whitworth College in Spokane, but did not receive any formal degree. After a series of odd jobs, working as an orderly in a psychiatric hospital, manager of a dance band, used car salesman, caterer, decorator, and vacuum cleaner salesman, Kienholz settled in Los Angeles, where he became involved with the avant-garde art scene of the day.

== Artistic development ==
In 1956, Kienholz opened the NOW Gallery, for which Michael Bowen designed the sign; that year he met grad student Walter Hopps, who owned the Syndell Gallery. They co-organized the All-City Art Festival, then in 1957, with poet Bob Alexander, they opened the Ferus Gallery on North La Cienega Boulevard. The Ferus Gallery soon became a focus of avant garde art and culture in the Los Angeles area.

Despite his lack of formal artistic training, Kienholz began to employ his mechanical and carpentry skills in making collage paintings and reliefs assembled from materials salvaged from the alleys and sidewalks of the city. In 1958, he sold his share of the Ferus Gallery to buy a Los Angeles house and studio and to concentrate on his art, creating free-standing, large-scale environmental tableaux. He continued to participate in activities at the Ferus Gallery, mounting a show of his first assemblage works in 1959.

In 1961, Kienholz completed his first large-scale installation, Roxy's, a room-sized environment which he showed at the Ferus Gallery in 1962. Set in the year 1943, Roxy's depicts Kienholz's memories of his youthful encounters in a Nevada brothel complete with antique furniture, a 30s era jukebox, vintage sundries, and satirical characters assembled from castoff pieces of junk. This artwork later caused a stir at the documenta 4 exhibition in 1968.

A 1966 show at the Los Angeles County Museum of Art (LACMA) drew considerable controversy over his assemblage, Back Seat Dodge ‘38 (1964). The Los Angeles County Board of Supervisors called it "revolting, pornographic and blasphemous", and threatened to withhold financing for the museum unless the tableau was removed from view. A compromise was reached under which the sculpture's car door would remain closed and guarded, to be opened only on the request of a museum patron who was over 18, and only if no children were present in the gallery. The uproar led to more than 200 people lining up to see the work the day the show opened. Ever since, Back Seat Dodge ’38 has drawn crowds. LACMA did not formally acquire the work until 1986.

In 1966, Kienholz began to spend summers in Hope, Idaho, while still maintaining studio space in Los Angeles. Also around that time, he produced a series of Concept Tableaux, which consisted of framed text descriptions of artwork that did not yet exist. He would sell these works of early Conceptual Art (though the term was not in widespread use at the time) for a modest sum, giving the buyer the right (upon payment of a larger fee) to have Kienholz actually construct the artwork. He sold a number of Concept Tableaux, but only The State Hospital progressed to a completed artwork.

Kienholz's assemblages of found objects—the detritus of modern existence, often including figures cast from life—are at times vulgar, brutal, and gruesome, confronting the viewer with questions about human existence and the inhumanity of twentieth-century society. Regarding found materials he said, in 1977, "I really begin to understand any society by going through its junk stores and flea markets. It is a form of education and historical orientation for me. I can see the results of ideas in what is thrown away by a culture."

Kienholz occasionally incorporated defunct or operating radios or televisions into their works, sometimes adding sound and moving images to the overall effect. Live animals were selectively included as crucial elements in some installations, providing motion and sound that contrasted starkly with frozen tableaus of decay and degradation. For example, The Wait, a dismal scene of a lonely skeletal woman surrounded by memories and waiting for death, incorporates a cage with a live parakeet cheerfully chirping and hopping about. The bird is considered an integral part of the installation, but requires special attention to ensure that it remains healthy and active, as described in the Whitney Museum's online catalog and video. Another well-known work, The State Hospital, incorporates a pair of black goldfish swimming in each of two glass goldfish bowls representing the head of an inmate suffering with mental illness.

Kienholz's work commented on racism, aging, mental illness, sexual stereotypes, poverty, greed, corruption, imperialism, patriotism, religion, alienation, and most of all, moral hypocrisy. Because of their satirical and antiestablishment tones, their works have often been linked to the funk art movement based in San Francisco in the 1960s.

Although he was an atheist and despised feigned religiosity, Kienholz carefully preserved an anonymous store window shrine discovered in Spokane, Washington. Calling this found outsider artwork The Jesus Corner, Kienholz exhibited it in a Spokane museum in 1984, and then showed it at the San Francisco Museum of Modern Art. Ten years later, Kienholz insisted on selling it at a reduced price to the Missoula Art Museum in Missoula, Montana, to ensure that it would be on view in an environment he felt comfortable with.

== Collaboration with Nancy Reddin (1972–1994) ==
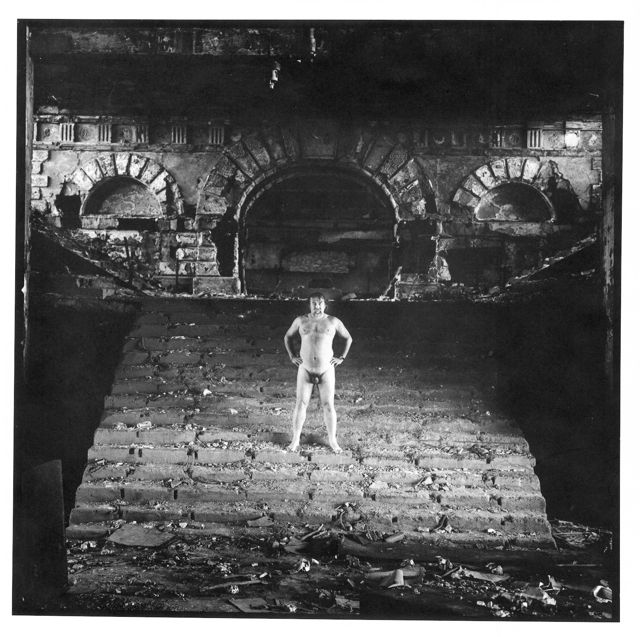
Edward Kienholz photographed by Lothar Wolleh, 1970

In The Infield Was Patty Peccavi by Edward and Nancy Kienholz; metal, resin, cloth, wood, glass, paper, photomechanical reproduction, electric lights, stuffed bird, and paint (1981, Hirshhorn Museum and Sculpture Garden)

In 1981, Ed Kienholz officially declared that all his work from 1972 on should be retrospectively understood to be co-authored by, and co-signed by, his fifth wife and collaborator, former photojournalist Nancy Reddin Kienholz. Collectively, they are referred to as "Kienholz". Their work has been widely acclaimed, particularly in Europe.

In the early 1970s, Kienholz received a grant that permitted him to work in Berlin. His most important works during this period were based on the Volksempfängers (fixed-channel radio receiving apparatus from the National Socialist period in Germany). In 1973, he was guest artist of the German Academic Exchange Service in Berlin. In 1974 Edward Kienholz performed with Jannis Kounellis, Wolf Vostell, and other artists in Berlin at the ADA - Aktionen der Avantgarde.

In 1973, Kienholz and Reddin moved from Los Angeles to Hope, Idaho, and for the next twenty years they divided their time between Berlin and Idaho. In 1976 he received a Guggenheim Fellowship. In 1977 he opened "The Faith and Charity in Hope Gallery" at their Idaho studio, and showed both established and emerging artists, including Francis Bacon, Jasper Johns, Peter Shelton, and Robert Helm. The Kienholzs continued to produce their own new installations and sculptures for exhibition.

== Death ==
Edward Kienholz died suddenly in Idaho on June 10, 1994, from a heart attack after hiking in the mountains near their home. He was a chronic smoker who had been struggling with diabetes, which progressively impaired use of his extremities. He was buried in an authentic Kienholz installation; Robert Hughes wrote, "[H]is corpulent, embalmed body was wedged into the front seat of a brown 1940 Packard coupe. There was a dollar and a deck of cards in his pocket, a bottle of 1931 Chianti beside him and the ashes of his dog Smash in the back. He was set for the afterlife. To the whine of bagpipes, the Packard, steered by his widow Nancy Reddin Kienholz, rolled like a funeral barge into the big hole."

After Edward's death, Nancy continued to administer their joint artistic estate, organizing shows and exhibitions, until her own death in 2019.

== Exhibitions ==
Retrospectives of Kienholz's work have been infrequent, due to the difficulty and expense of assembling fragile, literally room-sized sculptures and installations from widely dispersed collections around the world. Kienholz work has often been difficult to view, both because of its subject matter, and the logistics of displaying it.

Relatively few of the major works had been on display in the US, the Kienholzes' native land, though American museums have now started to feature their work more prominently, especially after a major retrospective (posthumous) exhibition in 1996 at the Whitney Museum of American Art. The Bowers Museum (Santa Ana, California), the Dayton Art Institute, the Honolulu Museum of Art, the National Gallery of Art (Washington, DC), the Oakland Museum of California, the San Francisco Museum of Modern Art, the Smithsonian American Art Museum, the University of Arizona Museum of Art, Los Angeles County Museum of Art (LACMA), the Weisman Art Museum at the University of Minnesota, Minneapolis, and the Whitney Museum of American Art (New York) are among the public collections holding work by Kienholz.

The diverse and freely improvised materials and methods used in Kienholz works pose an unusual challenge to art conservators who try to preserve the artist's original intent and appearances. Treatment of Back Seat Dodge '38 for clothes moths presented an awkward situation, which was deftly addressed by the Getty Conservation Institute and the J. Paul Getty Museum in behalf of LACMA, the owner of the artwork.

In 2009, the National Gallery in London mounted an exhibition of The Hoerengracht (Dutch: Whores' Canal), a 1980s streetscape installation portraying the red light district of Amsterdam, Netherlands. From May 6 to June 19, 2010, Kienholz's Roxy's (1960) was meticulously reconstructed and visible through the aperture of two panoramic windows at David Zwirner Gallery in New York City.

In 2011, Kienholz's work was visited with renewed attention in Los Angeles partly as a result of the Pacific Standard Time series of exhibitions, which saw his powerful 1972 installation Five Car Stud reinstalled at LACMA. The oversized installation is framed by five vehicles parked in a circle, their headlights illuminating a stark racial hatred castration scene. It was exhibited in Los Angeles and Germany in 1972, then purchased by a Japanese collector and kept in storage for almost 40 years, known only through documentary photos from those exhibitions. In September 2011, it was re-installed at LACMA. At Art Basel 2012, it was purchased by the Prada Foundation.

Kienholz's work entitled The Jesus Corner is now on display at the Museum of Arts and Culture in Spokane, Washington.

== Legacy ==
Kienholz is acknowledged as a pioneer, as early as 1960 with Roxy's, of what came to be known as installation art and assemblage art. He also produced early works of conceptual art with his Concept Tableau series in the mid-1960s. In 1968, Ed Kienholz's carefully documented and self-consciously outrageous behavior in what has been called the "TWA Incident" revealed aspects of what would later be called "performance art". In spite of his claims to be merely a rough working-class carpenter and mechanic, Kienholz was well aware of his position in the contemporary art scene, and acted assertively to shape his image and legacy.

French philosopher Jean-François Lyotard's book Pacific Wall (Le mur du pacifique) is an extended meditation on Keinholz's Five Car Stud installation.
