= Susan Lydon =

American writer (1943–2005)

Susan Gordon Lydon
- Lydon with her daughter Shuna in 1968
- Born: Susan Carol Goldenberg; November 14, 1943; New York City, U.S.
- Died: July 15, 2005 (aged 61); Boca Raton, Florida, U.S.
- Education: Vassar College
- Occupations: Journalist, author, columnist
- Spouse: Michael Lydon (m. 1965–1971)
- Children: 1
- Writing career
- Notable work: "The Politics of Orgasm" (1970)

Susan Gordon Lydon (November 14, 1943 – July 15, 2005) was an American journalist and writer, known for her 1970 feminist essay "The Politics of Orgasm", which brought the female fake orgasm into popular discussion.

She helped start Rolling Stone magazine and covered music journalism for it, and also wrote pieces for Ramparts, Ms. and The New York Times Magazine. She started a newspaper for the Arica School in the 1970s. She was a columnist for the Oakland Tribune newspaper, and she wrote two books about knitting.

In 1993 she published a memoir, Take The Long Way Home: Memoirs of a Survivor, detailing her career, drug-addiction, and recovery. Her memoir came one year after the book Home Fires, written by Don Katz about her birth family, the Gordons.

== Early life ==
Lydon was born to an American Jewish family in The Bronx. Her father was electrician Sam Goldenberg, and her mother was Eve Samberg, a singer at resorts in the Catskills Mountains; they married in 1942. Sam left to serve in the U.S. Army in Europe in 1943, and Lydon was born in November while he was away. She was named by her mother for actress Susan Hayward.

After her father returned in 1945, the family welcomed two more daughters, Lorraine (1946) and Sheila (1949). In 1952, they all moved to Island Park on Long Island, to live in the newly built suburbs, and they changed their surname to Gordon. Son Ricky was born in 1956; post-partum woes added to the bouts of depression that had come over Eve in 1955. In 1961 at age 17, Lydon was sneaking out of the house to nightclubs, and smoking marijuana. Despite these peccadillos, she earned a full scholarship and entered Vassar College in September 1961 to study history. At Vassar, she started taking diet pills containing amphetamine, and continued to smoke marijuana. She met Michael Lydon, a student at Yale University. In 1965 she graduated from college and married Michael.

== Journalism ==
Michael and Susan Lydon moved to the UK to work in journalism. He wrote about British affairs for the American magazine Newsweek. As a freelancer, she submitted fashion pieces for London Life magazine, the newly adopted name of the Tatler, published weekly during the Swinging Sixties. She also wrote for The Times.

The two left London for San Francisco at the beginning of 1967, just in time to witness and report on Michael Bowen's Human Be-In in Golden Gate Park, where they dropped acid (lysergic acid diethylamide or LSD) and listened to Timothy Leary tell the crowd that people living in cities should reorganize as tribes and villages. Lydon enrolled in graduate studies at San Francisco State University, but she soon dropped out of school. She wrote for Sunday Ramparts, a supplement of Ramparts, connecting with Jann Wenner, the arts editor. Wenner was starting Rolling Stone, and he recruited both of the Lydons to assist with managing the project. Michael Lydon thought he was hired as managing editor, but this position was taken by Herbert "Hirk" Williamson. Susan Lydon refused menial, secretarial assignments suggested by Wenner and instead wrote reviews and articles. She helped edit and produce the magazine. She gave the magazine its slogan "All the news that fits" which she lifted from an April Fools issue of the Columbia Daily Spectator, writing "All the news that fits we print", a parody of The New York Times' slogan, "All the News That's Fit to Print".

Lydon's daughter Shuna was born in March 1968, and she left Rolling Stone, writing for a short-lived Hearst periodical titled Eye aimed at the youth market. Helen Gurley Brown took over Eye as editor, and chastised Lydon for writing so much about sex, drugs and politics. Lydon accepted assignments from The New York Times Magazine, and she edited a biography of Huey P. Newton for Ramparts, later recalling the day when gun-toting Bobby Seale guarded the Ramparts office building while Eldridge Cleaver was smuggled out of the country. In late November 1968, Lydon attended the first women's liberation conference at Camp Hastings in Lake Villa, Illinois, at which 200 women's rights activists met. Lydon separated from her husband in January 1969, taking her daughter to Berkeley to live with Ramparts contributor Tuck Weills for six months. In December 1969 she was at the Altamont Free Concert to report on the Rolling Stones and the music scene, but she was appalled to witness there the death of the "good vibes" of the sixties.

=== "The Politics of Orgasm" ===
In Berkeley, Lydon met with women feminists who were conducting a consciousness raising awareness meeting, and she was shocked to hear one woman admit to never having experienced an orgasm. The women in the group opened up about their sexuality, and Lydon determined to write about this little-understood topic. She proposed the idea to Ramparts' male editorial board, including Robert Scheer, who all laughed at her. She cried in the face of their ridicule, but persisted with her vision, writing the essay "Understanding Orgasm", which editor Peter Collier changed to "The Politics of Orgasm", published by Ramparts in 1970. Scheer buried the article in the back pages, but this failed to hide it. Scheer later said it turned out to be "one of our great articles".

"The Politics of Orgasm" brought the subject of fake orgasm into the mainstream. A few earlier writers had uncovered the topic: based on the Kinsey Reports and the studies of Masters and Johnson, psychiatrist Mary Jane Sherfey had challenged Sigmund Freud's ideas in 1967, saying he was wrong about a distinct "vaginal orgasm", separate from clitoral orgasm, with the vaginal sort somehow superior. In 1968, Shulamith Firestone wrote the revealing "Women Rap About Sex" for the group New York Radical Women. Anne Koedt published "The Myth of the Vaginal Orgasm" in the same issue of Notes from the First Year, which was seen by a limited circle of feminists. But Lydon's article prompted a much wider discussion of the prevalence of the fake orgasm, how a majority of women were unsatisfied in sex, frustrated by Freud's disproved assertion about vaginal orgasm.

If woman's pleasure was obtained through the vagina, then she was totally dependent on the man's erect penis to achieve orgasm; she would receive her satisfaction only as a concomitant of man's seeking his. With clitoral orgasm, woman's sexual pleasure was independent of the male's, and she could seek her satisfaction as aggressively as the man sought his, a prospect which didn't appeal to too many men. The definition of normal feminine sexuality as vaginal, in other words, was a part of keeping women down, of making them sexually, as well as economically, socially, and politically subservient.

Lydon called upon women to stop creating and perpetuating problems by faking so many orgasms: "With their men, they often fake orgasm to appear 'good in bed' and thus place an intolerable physical burden on themselves and a psychological burden on the men unlucky enough to see through the ruse." Newspapers and radio talk shows debated her work. Women began to demand equal rights in bed, insisting that their pleasure was its own goal. UK feminist Alison Garthwaite said that Lydon's paper electrified the Leeds Revolutionary Feminist Group, opening the topic of women's sexuality.

Lydon divorced in 1971. She freelanced in rock journalism and took a series of lovers. She lived in Marin County with drummer Dave Getz, ex–Big Brother and the Holding Company, and wrote a piece about Janis Joplin. She tried heroin and became addicted. She interviewed Helen Reddy for Ms. magazine, Dr. John for the Daily News, Mark Spitz for The New York Times Magazine, as well as Debbie Harry, Joni Mitchell and Paul Simon.

While in Marin, Getz contracted hepatitis, and Lydon soon acquired it, too, serious enough to confine her to bed. She was invited in 1974 by a friend at the Arica School to move with her daughter to New York to write for Arica. Recovering from illness, she founded and edited the Arica internal newspaper the No Times Times. She was a columnist at The Village Voice, and wrote for The New York Times Magazine and other periodicals, often working from her communal residence on the Upper East Side of Manhattan amid her Arica colleagues. In 1985, her addictions escalated beyond control, and she was evicted. Her daughter, Shuna, was left alone while Lydon worked multiple jobs, shoplifted, stole money or prostituted herself to get another dose of heroin. Lydon even stole her mother's car. Shuna found refuge at the Gordons' house in Long Island, staying with her grandparents during her high school years. In 1986, the Gordons organized an intervention, convincing Lydon to check in to a detox center in Minnesota. In Minnesota, she connected with a violent boyfriend, smoked crack cocaine and started "boosting" – shoplifting for quick resale. She was arrested and prosecuted for theft and drug sales, and found guilty. Facing decades of jail time or court-ordered drug treatment, Lydon chose treatment and was sent from Minnesota to Mattapan in Boston. She started a long period of addiction recovery at Women Inc., a feminist clinic focused on the rehabilitation of hardcore female drug addicts, where she ceased all drug intake. After psychological evaluation at Women Inc., she faced the possibility that she had been sexually abused as a child by a family member. She proved her independence by staying clean for a year at the clinic, then moved to a nearby apartment to restore her career. Remaining sober for the rest of her life, she obtained work as a typesetter in Boston, and resumed freelance writing.

In 1989, Lydon moved back to the San Francisco Bay Area, following her daughter, Shuna, who was enrolling in photography at California College of the Arts. Lydon settled in East Oakland, and in 1996 began writing for the Oakland Tribune and the associated ANG newspapers. She rose to the position of regional director and editor. In 2001, she started the popular column "Cityscape", highlighting local happenings.

== Knitting ==
In her childhood, Lydon did some knitting, but she became more serious in college. In 1992 while birdwatching in Napa, she broke an arm and shoulder in a fall, and she used knitting as physical therapy. She became an avid knitter, and wrote about the subject, humorously questioning whether she was a "Master knitter or demon knitter. You be the judge." Her best work was a series of shawls woven in a feather-and-fan pattern from qiviut, the fine inner hair of the muskox. She traveled the world to interview knitting women of various cultures that had retained the history and custom of knitting. From this material, she published two books: The Knitting Sutra (1997) and Knitting Heaven and Earth: Healing the Heart With Craft, the latter published in June 2005 just prior to her death in July. She likened knitting to prayer beads ("one prayer for each bead or each stitch") and devotional meditation: "I crave more deeply a communion with nature, with palpable works that emanate from the hands of God. I am a woman... I know how to pray with my hands, and I need those prayers to connect me with the earth." Lydon led knitting workshops at various places including Esalen.

== Memoir ==
Beginning in 1990, Don Katz began interviewing Lydon and her birth family the Gordons for his book Home Fires, published in 1992. The book was hailed as an unvarnished look at the struggles of a typical post-war American family in which the children rebelled and developed into adults in ways that were not foreseen by the parents. At the same time, Lydon started writing a memoir about her own life, published in 1993 as Take The Long Way Home: Memoirs Of A Survivor. Lydon's memoir focused on the more troubling aspects of her life, especially drug abuse, addiction, and incest. The Los Angeles Times reviewed the book as "extremely brave and moving". Lydon named her alcoholic grandfather as the likely malefactor of sexual abuse committed when she was two years old. Lydon was conflicted, certain that something bad had happened to her, but pleading "How will I ever know for sure?" Laura Shapiro of The New York Times was unimpressed with Lydon's revelation of childhood incest, accusing Lydon of a "fatal fondness for easy answers." Shapiro opined that Lydon had failed to achieve the perspective of objectivity, despite her years of self-analysis at Arica.

Lydon retreated every summer to a cabin on the Russian River to write, knit and birdwatch with women friends. She regularly spoke to recovering drug addicts about her experience. In 1994, Lydon had a kidney removed to treat renal cancer. In 2002, she took medical leave from her newspaper to fight breast cancer with chemotherapy and radiation. Treatment continued until April 2004, when liver cancer was discovered. In what would be the last weeks of her life, she went to Boca Raton in Florida to enter hospice and be with her sister, brother, mother, and daughter. She died of liver cancer on July 15, 2005, at the age of 61.
