= A Place to Call Home =

A Place to Call Home may refer to:

- A Place to Call Home (1970 film), a 1970 Hong Kong Shaw Brothers drama film
- A Place to Call Home (1987 film), a 1987 Australian TV film
- A Place to Call Home (novel), a 1997 romance novel by Deborah Smith
- A Place to Call Home (album), the 1995 debut solo album by Joey Tempest
- A Place to Call Home (opera), 1994, by Edward Barnes, commissioned by the Los Angeles Opera
- A Place to Call Home (TV series), a 2013–2018 Australian television series
