= Deanne Meek =

American operatic mezzo-soprano

Deanne Meek is an American operatic mezzo-soprano who has had an active international career since the mid 1990s. She has performed at several major opera houses around the world, including La Scala and the Metropolitan Opera.

== Life and career ==
Raised in Richland, Washington, Meek earned a B.A. from Whitman College in 1983 before pursuing vocal studies at the Peabody Institute of Music (Bachelor of Music, 1988) where she was a pupil of renowned mezzo-soprano Elaine Bonazzi.

In 1996 Meek made her professional opera debut at the New York City Opera (NYCO) as Suzuki in Madama Butterfly. She returned there the following year to sing both Diana in Gluck's Iphigenie en Tauride and Zerlina in Don Giovanni. She appeared at the NYCO again in 1998 to portray Harriet Mosher in Tobias Picker's Emmeline. In the Spring of 1998 she portrayed Karolka in Jenůfa at the Spoleto Festival USA. In 1999 she portrayed Cherubino in The Marriage of Figaro at the Opera Theatre of Saint Louis. She returned to Saint Louis the following year as Zenobia in Handel's Radamisto.

In 2001 Meek made her debut at Opera Pacific as Octavian in Der Rosenkavalier, her debut at the Metropolitan Opera as one of the Cretan women in Idomeneo, and returned to the Spoletto Festival as Dido in Dido and Aeneas. Later that year she appeared as Kate Pinkerton in Madama Butterfly at the Met. She has since returned to the Met as the Second Sprite in Rusalka (2004) and the Second Esquire in Parsifal (2006).

In 2003 Meek made her debut at the English National Opera as Ruggiero in Alcina. In 2004 she returned to Opera North as Rosina in The Barber of Seville, and appeared at the Grange Park Opera as Angelina in La Cenerentola. In 2005 she made her debut at the Opéra national du Rhin as Dorabella in Così fan tutte. In 2006 she portrayed Ines in Il trovatore at the Bregenzer Festspiele, and the Composer in Ariadne auf Naxos at Tulsa Opera.

In 2007 Meek created the role of Ma Joad in the world premiere of Ricky Ian Gordon's The Grapes of Wrath at the Minnesota Opera. That same year she appeared as Bianca in Alexander von Zemlinsky's Eine florentinische Tragödie at the Bard Music Festival with conductor Leon Botstein and the American Symphony Orchestra. In 2008 she performed the role of Donna Elvira in Don Giovanni with the Utah Opera.

In January 2009 Meek portrayed the title role in Marc Blitzstein's Regina at the Utah Opera. The following June she made her debut at La Scala in Milan as Hermia in Benjamin Britten's A Midsummer Night's Dream. Later that year she performed the role of Guilhen in Vincent d'Indy's Fervaal at Avery Fisher Hall at Lincoln Center in New York City. In 2010 she sang Bianca again for her debut at the Teatro Colón in Buenos Aires.

In 2011 Meek portrayed Mrs. Lovett in Sweeney Todd at the Théâtre du Châtelet in Paris. In 2013 she sang in the world premiere of Sheila Silver's song cycle Beauty Intolerable alongside soprano Lauren Flanigan in New York. In 2014 she sang the title role in Handel's Giulio Cesare at the Florentine Opera.
