= A Muskrat Lullaby =

A Muskrat Lullaby is a one-act children's opera by Edward Barnes, based on the children's book, Mama Don't Allow by Thacher Hurd. The work was commissioned by the Los Angeles Opera with funding from the Milken Family Foundation, and originally premiered in Los Angeles in 1993. The work went on to multiple productions by opera companies across the United States, including The Lyric Opera of Kansas City, Opera Columbus, Orlando Opera, Manhattan School of Music, Mercer University, University of Akron, and many more.

Cast: Miles, a muskrat (tenor) Bird (soprano) Spider (mezzo-soprano) Toad (bass) Boss Alligator (baritone) Alligator Gang (children) Townspeople (children)

Duration: 25 minutes

Orchestration: Piano, or piano/electric keyboard and percussion
