= Utah Opera =

The Utah Opera is an American opera company that has been merged with Utah Symphony since July 2002, with a combined audience of more than 150,000 annually.

== History ==
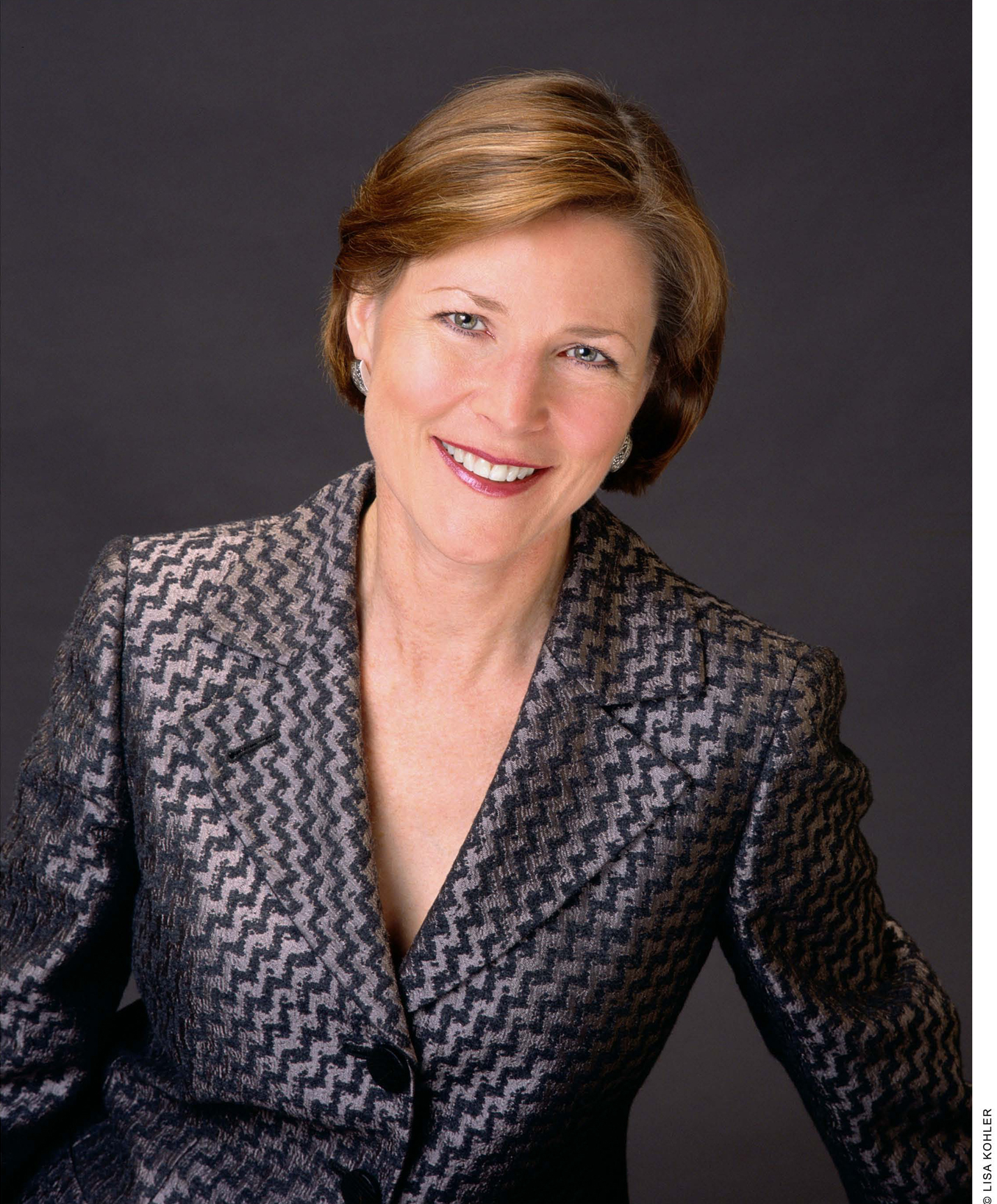
Anne Ewers, General Director 1991-2007 Utah Opera Production Studios in Salt Lake City, Utah where productions are rehearsed and costumes, props and set pieces are designed, built, stored and rented out to other opera companies around the world.

In 1978, the Utah Opera company presented its first production of Puccini's La bohème. The founding General Director was tenor Glade Peterson. After Peterson's death in 1990, Anne Ewers was appointed General Director in 1991, with a tenure marked by the casting of younger artists. In 1996–97, the company increased their number of annual productions from three to four. The expanding popularity of the company's performances inspired the growth from a three-production season, to a four-production season beginning in 1996–97. In 2002, the company merged with the Utah Symphony, and Ewers was named as president and CEO. Utah Opera's current artistic director is Christopher McBeth.

== Education ==
In the fall of 1977, Glade Peterson began education and outreach programs. By the 1980–81 season, the Opera in the Schools program had reached 30,000 Utah students. Company singers performed in 61 public schools, everywhere from Saint George to Wendover. Their efforts were rewarded; an article in the 'Utah Opera Notes', the tri-annual opera newsletter, stated that six-year-old Richard Daniel Vernon, the youngest recorded contributor to the Utah Opera Company, had donated $1.25 in cash after hearing that without financial assistance, the Utah Opera company would be unable to continue performances, and he would not be able to continue listening to his favorite music.

== Productions ==
=== Commissions ===
In 1996, Utah Opera featured the world premiere of Dreamkeepers. In 2007, Utah Opera co-commissioned Michael Korie and Ricky Ian Gordon's The Grapes of Wrath in 2007. The Opera's western state's premiere took place in Utah's own Janet Quinney Lawson Capitol Theatre.

In the 2017–2018 40th anniversary season, Utah Opera created a new production of Jake Heggie and Gene Scheer's opera Moby-Dick, which premiered in 2010 at Dallas Opera.

At the end of the 2018–2019 season, Utah Opera commissioned a set of four short operas in their 10-Minute Opera Project to commemorate the 150th anniversary of the completion of the US Transcontinental railroad. The four works – all thematically related to the railroad – were directed by dramaturg Omer Ben Seadia and had a three-day rolling premiere schedule May 20–22, 2019, beginning in Brigham City, Utah, then in Ogden, Utah at the historic Union Station (Ogden, Utah), with the final premiere performance in Salt Lake City.

The four operas are:

- The Stone, the Tree, and the Bird by composer Jacob Lee and librettist Christine McDonough
- Completing the Picture, by composer Michael Ching and librettist/research/choreographer Victoria Panella Bourns
- Burial, by composer Tony Solitro and librettist Paisley Rekdal
- No Ladies in the Lady’s Book, by composer Lisa Despain and librettist Rachel Peters

=== Cultural Olympiad 2002 Olympics ===
In 2002, the Utah Opera participated in the 2002 Cultural Olympiad (a series of performances and art installations connected to the 2002 Winter Olympics held in Salt Lake City, Utah) by offering a performance of A Little Night Music by Stephen Sondheim. The musical was selected in part because of Sondheim is an American composer, to represented American opera to the international audience. The performance on February 5, 2002, was offered in addition to the five regular-season performances in late January/early February, 2002. All performances took place at the historic Capitol Theater in downtown Salt Lake City.

== Production studios ==
Utah Opera purchased its production studios in 1995, using the building for rehearsals, administration, and costume/set design and storage. In subsequent years, the Production Studios were expanded; remodelling the existing 38,700 square feet, and building on an additional 30,000 square feet. It boasts a very large rehearsal space, an equally large space for set-building/design, a shop for costume and wigs design/construction, extensive costume and sets storage, a dance rehearsal space, and administrative offices. Sets and costumes are regularly rented from Utah Opera by opera companies around the US.

=== Costume Department ===
The Costume Department is located in Utah Opera's production studios. In 1978, Susan Allred was named as lead designer of the costuming department, a position she held for more than 30 years. Highly detailed machines, cutting tables, and floors allow for production of costumes. This work can take 6 months to a year to complete for a single show. There are more than 150,000 individual pieces of inventory in the Costume Department, including small pieces like cravats, belts, hats, shoes, and ties. The storage room for these materials is so large that employees use maps to find needed items. The inventory is organized in 11 rows of racks with 2–3 layers of clothes per row, with separate rooms for smaller items like shoes, ties, and jewelry.

The Costume Department organizes rentals for at least 18–20 full productions every year, and rents out individual pieces or partial shows all year long. Measurements are sent into the shop, and alterations are all completed there to ensure the quality of costumes stay pristine. The total number of costumed productions in storage is 45, with the most popular being La bohème, Madama Butterfly, and The Barber of Seville.

== 40th anniversary season ==
The 40th anniversary season (2017–2018) began with '40 Days of Opera,' a cultural festival with 40 days of local opera events from September 1 – October 15, culminating in the production of La bohème, and featured a gala with Renée Fleming to support Utah Opera's education programs, as well as Puccini's La bohème, Heggie and Scheer's Moby-Dick, a double score of Leoncavallo / Puccini's Pagliacci and Gianni Schicchi, and Johann Strauss's Die Fledermaus.
