= Mystery on the Docks =

Mystery on the Docks is a one-act children's opera by Edward Barnes, based on a book by Thacher Hurd. The opera was a joint commission from the Lyric Opera of Kansas City, Los Angeles Opera, and Opera Columbus, sponsored by a consortium commissioning grant from the Wallace Foundation. Mystery on the Docks premiered in Kansas City, Missouri, in August 1995 and went on to further productions by the Los Angeles Opera, Opera Columbus, Memphis Opera, Cincinnati Opera, University of Southern Illinois, and many others.

Cast: Ralph, a short order cook (tenor); Big Al, a criminal rat (baritone); Edwina Bombastina, internationally renowned opera star (soprano), Rat Gang (children); townspeople (children)

Duration: 30 minutes

Orchestration: Piano, or piano and percussion
