= Orgasm gap =

Disparity in sexual satisfaction

The orgasm gap or pleasure gap is the disparity in sexual satisfaction—specifically the unequal frequency in achieving orgasm during sexual encounters—between heterosexual men and women. Across every demographic that has been studied, women report the lowest frequency of reaching orgasm during sexual encounters with men. Researchers believe that multiple causes contribute to the orgasm gap. Orgasm gap researcher Laurie Mintz argues that the primary reason for this form of gender inequality is due to "our cultural ignorance of the clitoris" and that it is commonplace to "mislabel women's genitals by the one part (the vagina) that gives men, but not women, reliable orgasms."

== History of research ==
The 1953 Kinsey Report, titled Sexual Behavior in the Human Female, made several observations including 'differences in frequencies of orgasm' between unmarried American females (200 orgasms on average before marriage, with 36% having never had an orgasm before marriage; 10% of all women in the study said they had never orgasmed at any period in their lives) and males (1500 orgasms on average before marriage; all males in the study reported having had an orgasm before marrying). By 1990, authors were referring to Kinsey et al.'s observed gender disparity in sexual experiences as the "orgasm gap", citing the premarital orgasm rates per gender as an example. Meanwhile, Masters & Johnson (1966) suggested that lesbian women had more orgasms than heterosexual women.

A 1994 study by Laumann et al. of sexual practices in the United States found that 75% of men and 29% of women always had orgasms with their spouse, while 40% of men and 80% of women thought their spouse always orgasmed during sex. These rates were different in non-marital straight relationships (cohabitational, long-term and short-term heterosexual relationships), with rates increasing to 81% for men and 43% for women orgasming during sex with their short-term partners, and 69% for men and 83% for women thinking their short-term partners always orgasmed. U.S. feminist writers Marcelle Karp and Debbie Stoller (1999) loosely referred to the 75/29 statistic as evidence that the orgasm gap existed, and to argue that more efforts were needed to sexually emancipate women, because 'there are a whole lot of women who most certainly aren't having fun yet'.

Studies indicate an oversimplification in the understanding of the orgasm gap in past research, as focusing on the orgasm quantity neglects further relevant dimensions of the phenomenon such as orgasm duration and quality.

== Contributing factors ==
=== Sexual behaviour and reaching orgasm ===
Data of sexual behaviour research indicates very few women (less than 30%) reach orgasm during mixed-sex sexual activity, whereas men (over 90%) usually do. During partnered sexual encounters, rates of orgasm for men do not vary depending on one's sexual orientation; though, lesbians or women who have sex with women report significantly higher rates of orgasm (up to 83%) than those who have sex with men. This variance among women is influenced by the prioritization of clitoral stimulation during women-only sexual encounters. It has been determined that for women, clitoral stimulation is the most reliable method of reaching orgasm, with nearly all women requiring some form of clitoral stimulation in order to achieve orgasm. Conversely, PIV (penis-in-vagina) intercourse does not reliably result in orgasm for women. Studies have found that women report pretending ("faking") to orgasm during PIV intercourse more than during any other sexual practice.

Feminist researchers credit the "phallocentricity" of mixed-sex partnering as being a main contributor to the orgasm gap; multiple studies of sexual behaviour and attitudes have concluded that mixed-sex partners prioritize PIV penetration and men's satisfaction. This tendency is known as "coital imperative", and contributes to the faking orgasm behaviour being more prevalent in women than in men: as there appears to be 'a sexual script in which women should orgasm before men, and men are responsible for women's orgasms', a woman may feel pressured to fake an orgasm before her male partner orgasms in order to please her male partner and avoid hurting his feelings.

Studies of heterosexual college hook-up culture found "both men and women reported that men are typically not concerned with women's pleasure in hookups, but both reported that men are very attentive to women's pleasure in relationships". Results show that women were less likely to reach orgasm during casual sex rather than relationship sex; this difference was attributed to an overall increased presence of focused clitoral stimulation and men's willingness to perform cunnilingus during relationship sex. However, one study found that cunnilingus was not significantly more likely to occur in relationships than in hookups.

Research has also found that gender differences in sexual entitlement might be a factor. A 2021 study found that people generally believed men were more entitled to an orgasm than women during a hook-up.

=== Scientific sexism ===
In a 2006 study, the philosopher of science Elisabeth Lloyd reviewed the most prominent studies of female sexuality and argues that the female orgasm has been impacted by the questionable scientific integrity of each of these studies as they are consistently predicated on androcentric assumptions about the female body. Feminist scholar Angela Towne (2019) posits that the "historically androcentric focus on the vaginal canal as the main female sex organ has helped create a gender-based orgasm gap during partnered sex".

Scholars have highlighted that within dictionaries, anatomy texts, sex education texts, and gynaecology texts, the vagina is most often cited as being the primary female erogenous zone, whereas the clitoris has been omitted or only briefly described. In a 2005 meta-analysis of anatomy literature intended for medical professionals, O'Connell et al. determined that "the typical anatomical textbook description lacks detail, describes male anatomy fully and only gives the differences between male and female anatomy rather than a full description of female anatomy". O'Connell et al. remark that "the anatomy of the clitoris has not been stable with time, as would be expected. To a major extent its study has been dominated by social factors. The clitoris is a structure about which few diagrams and minimal description are provided… Specific study of anatomical textbooks across the 20th century revealed that details from genital diagrams presented early in the century were subsequently omitted from later texts. These examples, particularly with the backdrop of the clitoris being discovered and rediscovered, indicate that the evolution of female anatomy across the 20th century occurred as a result of active deletion rather than simple omission in the interests of brevity". Gabriele Falloppio described the clitoris in 1561, highlighting the fact that "modern anatomists have entirely neglected it", yet his findings were consistently dismissed by his colleagues; Andreas Vesalius stated it was a "new and useless part" that had no function in "healthy women". Later anatomists, including Regnier de Graaf in the 17th century, also provided a full description of the clitoris, though their work was also either ignored or suppressed. Not until 1998 was mainstream science willing to acknowledge the importance of the clitoris due to O'Connell et al.'s breakthrough work revealing the true extent of the clitoris' size and complexity through MRI technology.

=== Socialization ===
==== Assertiveness and communication ====
In general, women have been associated with having a decreased degree of sexual assertiveness in comparison to men and this is often found to be at the detriment of women's own sexual satisfaction. It has been proposed that for women, masturbation is an effective means to discover one's own preferences in order to be able to communicate the same to sexual partners. Communication in which one is able to articulate their sexual needs or interests, along with having a partner receptive to the same, are both instrumental aspects of satisfying sexual relationships. There is a tendency for open sexual communication to be low or lacking between couples who experience difficulty with reaching orgasm. Women who have difficulty reaching orgasm report that they may hide this from their partner by incorrectly communicating their sexual satisfaction, and that this is most commonly completed through the performance of a fake orgasm. Furthermore, it has been noted that "women view their own orgasm as important for their partners (i.e., to communicate their enjoyment of a sexual experience) more so than for their own pleasure" and that the existing pressure to produce an orgasm for male partners during sexual activity is a barrier for them to actually orgasm. This pressure stems from what is known as the "orgasm imperative", which is derived from the idea that orgasm is a necessary component for a successful or validated sexual experience.

==== Sex education ====
The aspect of pleasure is generally overlooked within sex education that is presented to youth; instead, the vast majority of content is primarily concerned with reproductive health, centering on preventative measures for unwanted pregnancy and sexually transmitted infections. Physiological processes of pleasure (such as arousal, orgasm, or ejaculation) are typically only referenced in a reproductive context, rather than for the sole purpose of pleasure; the main reason being for this is that these components of pleasure are deemed necessary of male bodies in order to conceive. Alternatively, areas of the body conducive to female pleasure- the clitoris, perineal or urethral sponges- are not linked to conception and therefore have been largely disregarded from sex education curricula and instead, only female internal organs are taught in the classroom setting. Scholars claim that "the lack of a cohesive understanding of pleasure makes pursuing implementation of pleasure overwhelming and inaccessible for educators and may account for why academic research on pleasure has failed to make its way into the practical world of sex education classrooms". Sexual self-exploration is also a commonly unaddressed topic within the classroom setting, yet "past research indicates that including masturbation in sexuality education can improve attitudes toward masturbation and debunk myths or false beliefs". One study of university students' sexual knowledge found that more than 60% of students held the false belief that the clitoris is located within the vaginal canal.

==== Media and pornography ====
Heterosexual activity depicted in mainstream media and pornography is predominantly centred on male pleasure and often includes sexual myths which may influence the construction of one's understanding of what constitutes normal/typical sexual behaviour. The female orgasm as portrayed by media and pornography regularly promotes a false image in which women orgasm from vaginal penetration alone. Researchers conclude that this idea may contribute to unrealistic expectations for what methods of sexual activity are necessary for women to orgasm in real life encounters.

People tend to turn to pornography as a useful tool for masturbation and to search the topics about which they fantasize for themselves. These scenarios can perpetuate sexual curiosity and may turn pleasureful acts into motivation, possibly turning into addiction.

Porn can also be directly linked to emotional suppression and reduce one's ability to orgasm with a partner because it causes a disconnect between partners goals for their sex, connection, and ability to arouse each other without online stimulation.

The desire for female porn viewers to see what they want to see, including the female performers on screen having real orgasms instead of fake ones, was one of the main factors leading to the rise of feminist pornography in the 1980s and 1990s in North America and Europe. According to feminist pornographer Tristan Taormino (2013), 'in feminist porn, female desire, pleasure, and orgasm are prioritized and celebrated. When the sex on screen represents the experience of the performers (no one is "faking" anything), and that experience is set up to be positive and supportive, sex is presented as joyful, fun, safe, mutual, and satisfying.'

== Solutions ==
There is an increasing body of research and technology innovations seeking out to diminish the heterosexual orgasm gap. One study in 2021 aimed to create terminology around clitoral stimulation techniques already used by women in order to give sexual partners better awareness and vocabulary with which to communicate during sex.

The study, which was funded by the intimate health company behind sex education website OMGYes which works with sex researchers and was published in PLOS ONE, used data from over 3,000 women in the US to learn what discoveries they had made to make sex more pleasurable. Interviews were then analysed and the names of the four most mentioned techniques were coined: angling, rocking, shallowing and pairing.

Angling, which involves the rotating or raising of the pelvis during penetration for adjustment was used by 87.5% of women. Around 76% used rocking, where the base of a penis or sex toy rubs against the clitoris consistently throughout penetration as opposed to thrusting in and out. Shallowing was used by 84% of women, where penetrative touch is experienced with tools, fingers, penises or lips just inside the entrance of the vagina and 69.7% used pairing, where a woman or her partner reaches down to stimulate the clitoris while penetration is occurring at the same time.

Dr. Devon Hensel, one of the study's co-authors, told the BBC that "sex research as a field has been around for well over 100 years and it was really incomprehensible to us as researchers that there were not names for these things. And when something is unnamed, it almost becomes unspeakable."

== See also ==
- Sexual script theory
- Sexual stimulation
- Vanilla sex
