= Leonard Foglia =

American dramatist

- Occupations: Theatre director; librettist; novelist

Leonard Foglia is an American theatre director, librettist, and novelist.

== Theatre ==
Foglia made his Broadway debut as the assistant director of The Heidi Chronicles in 1989. He also directed revivals of Wait Until Dark (1998) and On Golden Pond (2005).

Foglia has collaborated with playwright Terrence McNally on three projects, Master Class (1995), By the Sea, By the Sea, By the Beautiful Sea (1996), and The Stendhal Syndrome (2004).

Foglia's off-Broadway credits include A Backer's Audition (1992), Lonely Planet (1994), One Touch of Venus (1996), and If Memory Serves (1999). His regional theatre credits include The Subject Was Roses, Thurgood, and The Secret Letters of Jackie & Marilyn. He wrote the libretto for Jake Heggie's opera The End of the Affair and conceived and directed Dreamland, a revue featuring the songs of Harold Arlen. In 2008, Foglia directed the world premiere of Jake Heggie's opera Last Acts at the Houston Grand Opera.

Foglia directed the production of a one-man show about the life and work of U.S. Supreme Court Justice Thurgood Marshall at Booth Theatre. Thurgood, starring Laurence Fishburne, opened officially on April 30, 2008.

In the fall of 2009, Foglia directed the world premiere musical Laughing Matters by Iris Rainer Dart at the Pasadena Playhouse in California. In 2009, he directed the production of Let Me Down Easy by Anna Deavere Smithm presented by Second Stage Theatre.

He wrote the libretto for the first mariachi opera, Cruzar la cara de la luna (To Cross the Face of the Moon), to José "Pepe" Martínez' (Vargas de Tecalitlán) music, which premiered at the Houston Grand Opera in 2010.

Foglia wrote the libretto for Ricky Ian Gordon's opera A Coffin in Egypt, which had its world premiere at the Houston Grand Opera in 2014.

== Books ==
With Washington Post cultural correspondent David Richards, Foglia co-authored the 1997 suspense novel 1 Ragged Ridge Road.

In 2011, again with Richards, Foglia co-authored the 2011 suspense novel Sudarium Trilogy: The Surrogate – Book One, The Son – Book Two and The Savior – Book Three.
