= Home Fires =

Home Fire or Home Fires may refer to:

== Literature ==
- Home Fire (novel), a novel by Kamila Shamsie
- Home Fires (Katz book), a 1992 book by Don Katz
- Home Fires (novel), a 2011 novel by Gene Wolfe

== Music ==
- Home Fire (album), a 1991 album by Ron Kavana
- Home Fires (album), an album by Dead Ringer Band

== Television ==
- Home Fires (British TV series), a drama series that debuted in 2015
- Home Fires (Canadian TV series), a drama series that debuted in 1980
- "Home Fires" (Upstairs, Downstairs), a 1974 episode

== See also ==
- Keep the Home Fires Burning (disambiguation)
- Structure fire, a fire in a home or other building
