= Inger Koedt =

Danish-born American resistance member (1915–2021)

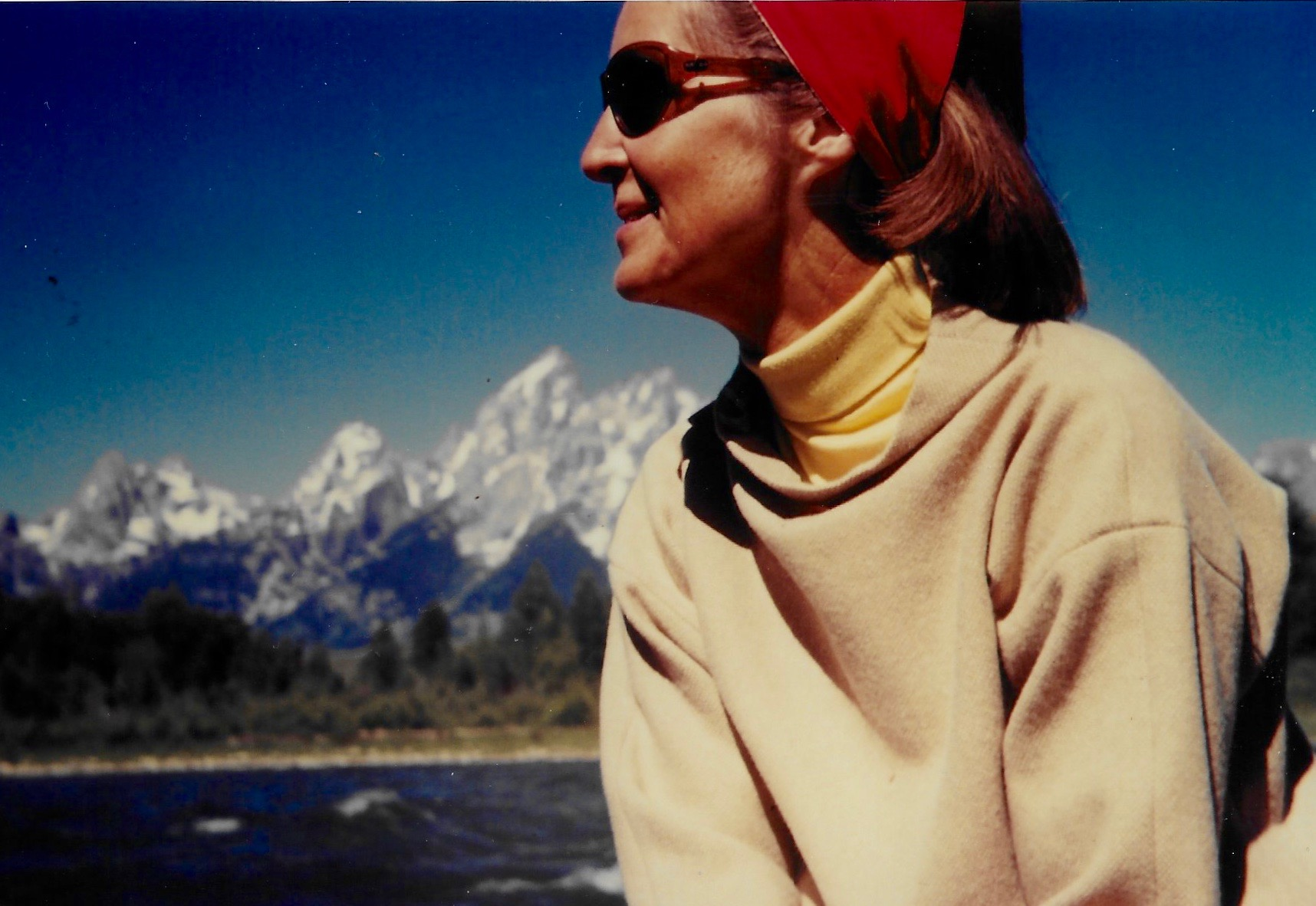
- Inger Koedt, rafting on the Snake River in the Tetons, c. 1968
- Born: January 15, 1915; Copenhagen, Denmark
- Died: August 16, 2021 (aged 106); Jackson Hole, Wyoming, United States
- Children: Bonnie Kreps, Anne Koedt, Peter Koedt

Inger Koedt (January 15, 1915 – August 16, 2021) was a Danish-born American woman who rescued Danish Jews as part of the Danish resistance movement. She emigrated to the United States after World War 2, becoming a community fixture in Jackson Hole, Wyoming.

== Personal life ==
Koedt was born in Copenhagen on January 15, 1915. When she was young, she married Bobs Koedt (born Andreas Peschcke-Koedt). Bobs was a Danish-American born in Riverside, California, and raised in a suburb of Copenhagen. Together they raised their three children in a suburb of Copenhagen until after World War 2. During the War, Bobs and Inger joined the Danish resistance to Nazism and harbored Danish Jews in the basement of their home. They smuggled over 30 Danish-Jewish families from their home in Charlottenlund to freedom in Sweden by boat. Bobs was arrested and interrogated by the Germans and sent to Nazi headquarters, but survived unharmed. Due to her husband's American citizenship, the Koedt family was able to easily immigrate to the United States and settled in San Francisco in 1951. A few years later, Inger and Bobs moved to Jackson Hole, Wyoming, becoming fixtures in the community. Suffering from depression and seizures, Bobs died by suicide shortly before his 80th birthday. Inger lived in Jackson Hole for over 60 years. Despite her nominally-Protestant upbringing, Koedt was not religious herself, and was closely involved with the Jackson Hole Jewish Community because she wanted to tell younger people what had really happened to the Jews in World War II.

An avid mountain climber, Koedt climbed the 14,000-foot Grand Teton at age 66 with her son, Peter Koedt.

She created the recipes for a cookbook titled "From Smorrebrod to Subs, Inger Koedt’s Recipes for the Mountains". The cookbook features Danish cuisine, local legends, and some of Koedt's family history.

Inger is the mother of the feminist writer Anne Koedt. Her daughter Bonnie Kreps is a feminist filmmaker. In 1972, Bonnie made an independent documentary about Inger, "Portrait of My Mother."

== Death ==
Koedt died in Jackson Hole, Wyoming, on August 16, 2021, at the age of 106. She was the oldest resident of Teton County, Wyoming, upon her death.
