= Coital imperative =

Belief in sexual relationships

The coital imperative is the idea or belief that penile–vaginal intercourse (PIV) is the defining practice in a sexual relationship. It's often taken for granted that intercourse is the primary, natural, and most desirable form of sexual activity, particularly within heterosexual sex. This idea makes the claim that anything else erotically charged is expected to be “preliminary foreplay” or a fun bonus rather than sex in itself.

While the coital imperative is widely held, there are growing calls to challenge it by promoting noncoital sexual practices as valid and enjoyable options, largely due to the normalization of modern sex education.

== Difference between "sex" and "coitus" ==
Historically, the terms sex and coitus have been misused as if they were synonymous. Coitus is one of the many practices that can occur during sexual intercourse (in addition to fondling, kissing, mutual masturbation, and oral sex) in which the penis is inserted into the vagina or anus. This confusion between the terms has led to practices in which penetration is not involved being denied the name and status of sex or to them not being considered a means of achieving pleasure or orgasm. The term has also been linked to the concept of phallocentrism—the reduction of the male body to the penis—by minimizing other sensitive and pleasurable zones and emotionality, attributes necessary for harmonious relationships within a couple.

Researchers often use the term sex to refer to penile-vaginal intercourse, while using specific words for other sexual behaviors. Scholars Richard M. Lerner and Laurence Steinberg state that researchers also "rarely reveal" how they conceptualize sex "or even whether they have resolved potential discrepancies" in conceptualizations of sex, and attribute researchers' focus on penile-vaginal sex to "the larger culture's preoccupation with this form of sexual activity." This focus may also relegate other forms of mutual sexual activity to mislabeled foreplay or contribute to their failure to be considered "real sex," and limits the meaning of rape. It may also be that the conceptual conflation of sexual activity with vaginal intercourse and sexual function hinders and limits reporting on sexual behavior that non-heterosexual people can have, or reporting on heterosexuals who may engage in non-vaginal sexual activity.

== In religion ==
This belief is deeply rooted in all cultures of society and is often intertwined with traditional gender roles and expectations about relationships and sexuality. For example, in the West, the Judeo-Christian tradition has been linked to the coital imperative. According to this tradition, sex is valid only within marriage and becomes a means of expressing intimate feelings, assuming responsibilities, and, above all, reproducing the species.

== Effects ==
The coital imperative of mixed-sex couples has often been credited as a major contributor to the orgasm gap; multiple studies on sexual behavior and attitudes have concluded that many of these couples prioritize penetration and the men's satisfaction (since women lack vaginal sensitivity), suggesting that this is a social and cultural issue.

== See also ==
- Orgasm imperative
