= Anne Koedt =

American feminist activist and author (born 1941)

- Born: 1941 (age 84–85); Copenhagen, Denmark
- Occupation: Activist
- Notable work: "The Myth of the Vaginal Orgasm" (1970)
- Spouse: Ellen Levine (m. 2011; died 2012)
- Parent: Inger Koedt

Anne Koedt (born 1941) is an American radical feminist activist and author of "The Myth of the Vaginal Orgasm", a 1970 classic feminist work on women's sexuality. She was connected to the group New York Radical Women and was a founding member of New York Radical Feminists.

== Early life and family ==
Koedt was born in Copenhagen in 1941 to Bobs Koedt (born Andreas Peschcke-Koedt) and Inger Koedt. Her parents had been members of the Danish resistance during World War II, harboring Jews in their basement until the refugees could be smuggled to Sweden. Her father was an architect and photographer who forged passports for leaders of the Danish resistance. Born in Riverside, California, Bobs grew up outside of Copenhagen. Bobs was arrested and interrogated by the Germans and sent to Nazi headquarters, but survived unharmed. Due to her father's American citizenship, the Koedt family was able to easily immigrate to the United States and settled in San Francisco. Her father, suffering from depression and seizures, died by suicide shortly before his 80th birthday. Her mother lived in Jackson Hole, Wyoming, for over 60 years. While having been raised Protestant, Inger was active with the Jackson Hole Jewish Community. In September 2011, Koedt married Ellen Levine, her partner for 40 years. In May 2012, Levine died. Inger died on 14 August 2021 at the age of 106. She was among the oldest residents of Teton County.

== Organizing ==
Koedt was a founding member of the New York Radical Women, an early feminist group begun in fall, 1967 which pioneered women's liberation through activism, such as disrupting the 1968 Miss America pageant, writing and publishing feminist work, and connecting personal issues to political oppression in the form of small-group consciousness-raising. By late 1968, she also co-founded The Feminists, a strict feminist separatist group begun by Ti-Grace Atkinson after she left the New York City chapter of the National Organization for Women; other prominent members included Sheila Michaels, Barbara Mehrhof, Pamela Kearon, and Sheila Cronan. In 1969, Koedt left the Feminists to form the New York Radical Feminists (NYRF) with Shulamith Firestone. NYRF (not to be confused, as it often is, with the larger and older New York Radical Women, which was still meeting and whose membership was fluid and often overlapped with the smaller groups] was organized into small cells or "brigades" named after notable feminists of the past; Koedt and Firestone led the Stanton-Anthony Brigade. By 1970, conflicting factions within NYRF had driven both Koedt and Firestone out of the group they had founded and Koedt withdrew from organized activism, later commenting "I was done with groups after that."

== Writings ==
=== "The Myth of the Vaginal Orgasm" ===
In 1968, Anne Koedt published her most influential work, "The Myth of the Vaginal Orgasm" in a radical-feminist journal from New York Radical Women's members, titled Notes from the First Year. In the article, Koedt frankly challenged the dominant understandings of female sexual pleasure held by most medical and psychoanalytic experts of the time, who were almost exclusively male. In particular, the article took issue with the predominant Freudian account of female sexuality that discounted the clitoral orgasm as "juvenile" and viewed orgasm achieved through the vagina as the only "mature" form. Women who failed to achieve orgasm through penetrative, heterosexual intercourse were therefore labeled as dysfunctional or frigid by the professional community. In Koedt's view, this approach placed unfair blame on women for their lack of satisfaction during straight sex, inaccurately pathologized normal female sexual function, and caused many women to seek unnecessary psychoanalytic treatment for a nonexistent ailment rather than exploring techniques that would lead to a more pleasurable sexual experience. In support of her position, Koedt marshaled up-to-date research on the female anatomy and sexual response, including recent work by Alfred Kinsey and Masters and Johnson, to demonstrate that the clitoris, rather than the vagina, is the primary site of erotic stimulation. Koedt went on to argue that male chauvinism and the urge to maintain women in a subservient role were the primary driving force perpetuating misconceptions surrounding female sexuality.

The article was widely circulated in pamphlet form, inspiring many supporters to advocate for celibacy or to promote lesbianism as positive alternative to heterosexuality for women. Other feminist readers were more critical, taking particular issue with Koedt's assertion that women who testified to experiencing vaginal orgasms were either confused due to lack of education regarding their own bodies or "faking it " so as not to offend their male lovers' egos.

=== "Women and the Radical Movement" ===
On February 17, 1968, Koedt delivered a speech regarding women's liberation and the role that radical women must play in the female revolution in order to change the overall fundamental concept of women. Koedt advocates for a systematic change, and urges radical women to challenge dominant/submissive dynamic that shapes the relationships between men and women. Koedt refers to women's issues and women's liberation as a social and political issue that has many similarities to the black power struggle. Koedt also touches on the topic of male supremacy and how to improve the condition of women as an oppressed group within society, highlighting the importance of fighting for women everywhere, not just within the radical movement. In her speech, Koedt calls for radical women to learn from history and from past revolutions in which women were a part of yet reaped none of the benefits, such as the American revolution and the Economic/Soviet revolution. The speech concludes that in order to change the basic structure of society which gives men power over women, women shouldn't support any revolution that aims to create change but does not care about the liberation of women from men's dominant position in society. It is not enough to improve secondary characteristics of freedom or to gain certain privileges, the real radical revolution must tackle the basic structure of female oppression within a patriarchal society.

=== "Notes From the First Year" ===
New York Radical Women compiled a group of feminist texts and speeches from their work in 1968 called "Notes From the First Year," which was edited by Koedt. The compilation included texts from Shulamith Firestone, Jennifer Gardner, Kathy Amatniek, and Koedt herself. Koedt's writings included The Myth of the Vaginal Orgasm and "Women and the Radical Movement," the speech she gave at the Free University in New York City on February 17, 1968.

=== Other writings ===
Koedt's December 1969 Politics of the Ego, A Manifesto for New York Radical Feminists was first published in Notes from the Second Year and later in her anthology Radical Feminism. An excerpt from this manifesto continued to be circulated as part of the 1976 "Introduction to New York Radical Feminists" pamphlet until the NYRF post office box closed in 1989.

Koedt became the editor of Notes From the Third Year replacing Shulamith Firestone in 1972. Some feminist groups felt that the more radical feminist positions that had been previously included were edited out of this third edition.

== Activism ==
In 1978, Koedt became an associate of the Women's Institute for Freedom of the Press (WIFP). WIFP is an American nonprofit publishing organization. The organization works to increase communication between women and connect the public with forms of women-based media.

== Selected works ==
- "The Myth of the Vaginal Orgasm" (1970)
- "Lesbianism and Feminism" (1971)
- Koedt, Anne; Levine, Ellen; Rapone, Anita (eds.) (1973). Radical Feminism.
