= Keep the Home Fires Burning =

Keep the Home Fires Burning may refer to:

- "Keep the Home Fires Burning" (1914 song), a British patriotic song by Ivor Novello and Lena Gilbert Ford
- "Keep the Home Fires Burning" (The Bluetones song), 2000
- Keep the Home Fires Burning, a 2004 novel by Anne Baker (author)
- "Keep the Home Fires Burning", a series 4 episode of the TV series The Flaxton Boys

== See also ==
- Home Fires (disambiguation)
- "Keep the Home Fries Burning", an episode of the TV series Murder, She Wrote
- "Keep the Homes Fires Burning", a season 5 episode of the TV series Designing Women
