= OMGYES =

American online educational platform

OMGYES is an online educational platform focused on the study of women's sexual pleasure. It presents findings from a program of peer-reviewed research, conducted with academic partners including researchers at Indiana University, through first-person video, demonstration, and interactive content. The platform and the studies it is based on have been covered as an attempt to bring empirical research to an area its authors described as understudied: the specific techniques associated with women's sexual pleasure.

== History ==
OMGYES was founded by Rob Perkins and Lydia Daniller and launched in 2015. According to the founders, the project began with conversations in university revealing that specific techniques for women's pleasure were passed around privately but had never been systematically studied, named, or taught; they raised research funding of $4.6 million and began a collaboration with researchers at Indiana University's School of Public Health. The project's method, as described in press coverage and its published studies, proceeded from large-scale qualitative interviews with women aged 18 to 95, to giving recurring techniques plain-language names, to testing their prevalence in nationally representative surveys, to publishing the results in peer-reviewed journals.

In 2015, a nationally representative survey of 1,055 U.S. women aged 18 to 94 was conducted using the GfK KnowledgePanel. Findings were published in 2017 in the Journal of Sex & Marital Therapy as one of the first large-scale, nationally representative studies of women's specific techniques for sexual pleasure and orgasm. CNN covered the study's findings in a 2017 health feature, describing the platform's videos of techniques such as "edging," "layering," and "orbiting."

In February 2016, actress Emma Watson mentioned OMGYES during a public conversation with Gloria Steinem in London, saying she subscribed to the site. The remark generated international coverage of the platform, including features in The Guardian, Wired, GQ, and TechCrunch.

== Research ==
=== Foundational studies ===
The 2017 Journal of Sex & Marital Therapy study, led by Debby Herbenick, found that women reported highly diverse preferences for genital touch in location, pressure, shape, and pattern.

The Second OMGYES Pleasure Report surveyed 3,017 American women aged 18 to 93 through the Ipsos KnowledgePanel and provided the dataset for several peer-reviewed publications. A 2021 study in PLOS ONE identified and named four techniques women use to make vaginal penetration more pleasurable (Angling, Rocking, Shallowing, and Pairing). A 2022 study in PLOS ONE reported techniques for pleasure from anal touch, and a 2024 study in The Journal of Sex Research examined women's experiences of and strategies for vaginal squirting. The techniques study continued to draw international coverage years after publication; in 2026, Brazil's O Globo reported on the four techniques and quoted the journal's senior editor on the importance of publishing research on the topic.

=== Platform efficacy ===
A 2021 study in The Journal of Sex Research, led by Devon Hensel at Indiana University, assessed the OMGYES platform itself as an educational intervention with 870 adult women over four weeks. The authors reported improvements in participants' knowledge of their own preferences, confidence, and self-reported quality of sexual experiences. Indiana University's news office described it as the first peer-reviewed evaluation of the platform.

== Reception ==
The Guardian described the platform as aiming to "demystify" female sexual pleasure through frank, educational content. Wired covered it as a data-driven approach to sex education. The Times called it "nothing less than the next wave of an unfinished sexual revolution." Sex therapist Stephen Snyder, reviewing the platform for Psychology Today, described it as "warm, wise, tasteful, and fun." Logic Magazine examined the project's research program and cultural context in a 2017 essay.

The platform also received sustained coverage in European media. Die Welt wrote that it aimed to educate about female pleasure "not with winking suggestions of sex on washing machines and candlelight in the bedroom, but with scientific findings and the experiences of real women with real needs." A critical essay in Die Zeit argued the platform converts feminist self-knowledge into a commercial product. Spain's El País profiled the platform in 2016, covering its founding story, research collaboration, and teaching format. In 2024, Le Monde included the platform in a feature on erotic experiences.

In 2023, The Guardian reported the platform had grown to more than one million users, situating it in a broader shift toward evidence-based sexual wellness. In 2024, a Scientific American podcast episode on the "orgasm gap" discussed the research program and the techniques it named. The Los Angeles Review of Books published a critical essay in 2021 examining OMGYES as a commercialized sexual-wellness product, analyzing its framing of pleasure as self-improvement labor.

=== Scholarship and clinical use ===
OMGYES has itself been the subject of independent academic study. A 2019 article in Design Issues analyzed the platform's design and its framing of the "sexual entrepreneur" in online sex education. A 2026 conference abstract by researchers at the University of California, San Francisco, presented a thematic content analysis of the platform's videos, published in a supplement of The Journal of Sexual Medicine. A 2025 scoping review in Archives of Sexual Behavior cited OMGYES in the context of pleasure-inclusive sex education. A 2026 pilot study presented at the American Psychosocial Oncology Society conference evaluated the platform as a digital sexual-health intervention for adolescent and young adult cancer survivors.

== Platform ==
OMGYES presents research findings through videos in which women describe and demonstrate specific techniques, alongside interactive touch simulations. Content is organized in collections available for a one-time purchase rather than a subscription, and is offered in multiple languages. The platform is produced by For Goodness Sake, LLC, the research company behind the studies.

== See also ==
- Orgasm gap
- Human female sexuality
- Sex education in the United States
