= David Richards (writer) =

American theater critic (1940–2023)

David Richards (October 1, 1940 – June 24, 2023) was an American theater critic and novelist.

Richards spent over thirty years as a theater critic for The Washington Post, The Washington Star and The New York Times. His articles have appeared in numerous publications in the United States. He is the author of Played Out: The Jean Seberg Story, a biography of the controversial American actress Jean Seberg who vaulted to fame in France before committing suicide in 1979.

With American theater director Leonard Foglia, Richards co-authored the 1997 suspense novel 1 Ragged Ridge Road. (ISBN 978-0671003555) In 2011 With Leonard Foglia, Richards co-authored the 2011 suspense novel trilogy The Sudarium Trilogy.

Richards died from complications of Parkinson's disease on June 24, 2023, at the age of 82.
