= By the Sea, By the Sea, By the Beautiful Sea =

Trilogy of plays by Terrence McNally, Lanford Wilson, and Joe Pintauro

By The Sea, By The Sea, By The Beautiful Sea is a trilogy of three short plays by Terrence McNally, Lanford Wilson, and Joe Pintauro. The title is taken from the first line of the chorus of the 1914 song "By the Beautiful Sea".

== Productions ==
The play was commissioned by the Bay Street Theater, Sag Harbor, New York, where it premiered in 1995.

The play opened Off-Broadway at the Manhattan Theatre Club City Center, Stage 2 in May 1996. The play was directed by Leonard Foglia, with sets by Michael McGarty, costumes by Laura Cunningham and lighting by Brian MacDevitt. The cast featured Mary Beth Fisher, Lee Brock and Timothy Carhart.

== Overview ==
The three acts of the play are: Dawn by Joe Pintauro, Day by Lanford Wilson and Dusk by Terrence McNally. In each of the plays, two women and one man meet on a beach. In Dawn, a husband and wife, and his sister, scatter their mother's ashes at the beach. In Day, a gardener is seduced by an attractive young woman, but his girlfriend arrives. In Dusk two women long for a handsome young man.

== Critical reception ==
In his review of the Bay Street Theater production, Alvin Klein wrote "his [Pintaro's] is the most tautly drawn work of the three... Not that the triple bill calls for a rating game. It is a successful experiment devoid of gimmickry. There is reason, esthetic and logical, to support the setting and the time in each work. Mr. Wilson adores plot... Mr. Wilson remains the contemporary theater's lyric playwright nonpareil. For the moment, Mr. McNally is the hottest of the lot, and it may be no accident that his contributuion to a seaside triptysh smacks of a slick artifice, a surfeit of manner over matter."

In a review of a production by the Vortex Theater, Albuquerque, New Mexico, the reviewer notes "The brief plays are not especially well written, lack dramatic focus, and fail to supply engaging characters or strong climaxes. I was never really able to identify fully with any of the nine characters in the three plays, a fault for which I do not hold the actors responsible."
