= The Myth of the Vaginal Orgasm =

1970 essay by Anne Koedt

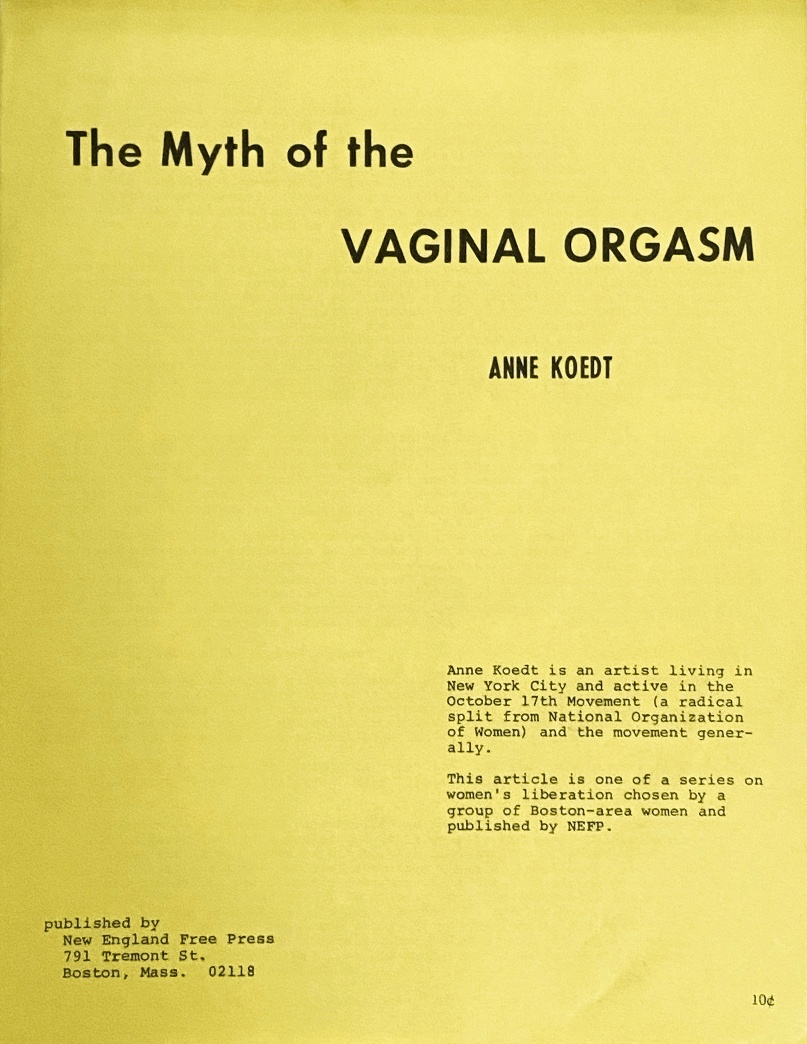
- Cover of the first edition
- Author: Anne Koedt
- Language: English
- Subject: Orgasm
- Published: 1970
- Publisher: New England Free Press
- Publication place: United States
- Media type: Print
- Pages: 4
- OCLC: 2393445

"The Myth of the Vaginal Orgasm" is a feminist essay on women's sexuality written by American radical feminist activist Anne Koedt in 1968, and published in 1970. It first appeared in a four-paragraph outline form in the Notes from the First Year which resulted in an extended article in Notes from the Second Year journals published by the New York Radical Women and was partially based on findings from Masters and Johnson's 1966 work Human Sexual Response. It was then distributed as a pamphlet in its full form, including sections on evidence for the clitoral orgasm, female anatomy, and reasons the "myth" of vaginal orgasm is maintained.

Koedt wrote this feminist response during the sexual revolution of the 1960s.

The goal of this response is to address the "myth of the vaginal orgasm", create awareness and education for women and men about female sexual pleasure, and to counter previous thought about the female orgasm. Koedt reflects in her writing, "It was Freud's feelings about women's secondary and inferior relationship to men that formed the basis for his theories on female sexuality. Once having laid down the law about the nature of our sexuality, Freud not so strangely discovered a tremendous problem of frigidity in women. His recommended cure for a woman who was frigid was psychiatric care. She was suffering from failure to mentally adjust to her 'natural' role as a woman."

Koedt breaks societal barriers of what is considered acceptable to discuss and her article played a vital role in the feminist sexual revolution, and draws on research done by Alfred Kinsey, among others, about human sexuality to support her claims.

== History ==
In 1998, urologist Helen E. O'Connell, and her colleagues conducted dissections on ten female cadavers, revealing that the externally visible portion of the clitoris represents only a small part of its total structure.

The organ extends internally, encompassing the vaginal muscles, and measures several inches in length. O’Connell’s findings indicate that orgasms once considered “vaginal” are in fact clitoral in origin, since it is the internal clitoral structures which are stimulated during vaginal penetration.

== In media ==
Pornography greatly perpetuates this narrative, causing many women to question whether what they are experiencing is an orgasm or not. Porn often portrays a man's orgasm being the center for pleasure and the woman as a submissive participant helping him get there; hers is a consolation prize.

The idea of women asking for what they want in order to orgasm is not the "sexy" part of porn, so when it's not included the viewers, often young people watching to learn, take away that they should not be asking for more. This inequitable representation can be directly linked to the orgasm gap and how it plays a role in sex.
