= A Place to Call Home (novel) =

1997 romance novel by Deborah Smith

A Place To Call Home is a romance novel by Deborah Smith published in 1997. The novel revolves around a female character living in a culturally and economically wealthy family in the Southern United States. It reached number 28 in the New York Times Bestseller List for paperbacks in 1998.
