= Capitol Theatre (Salt Lake City) =

Theatre in Salt Lake City, Utah, US

Janet Quinney Lawson Capitol Theatre
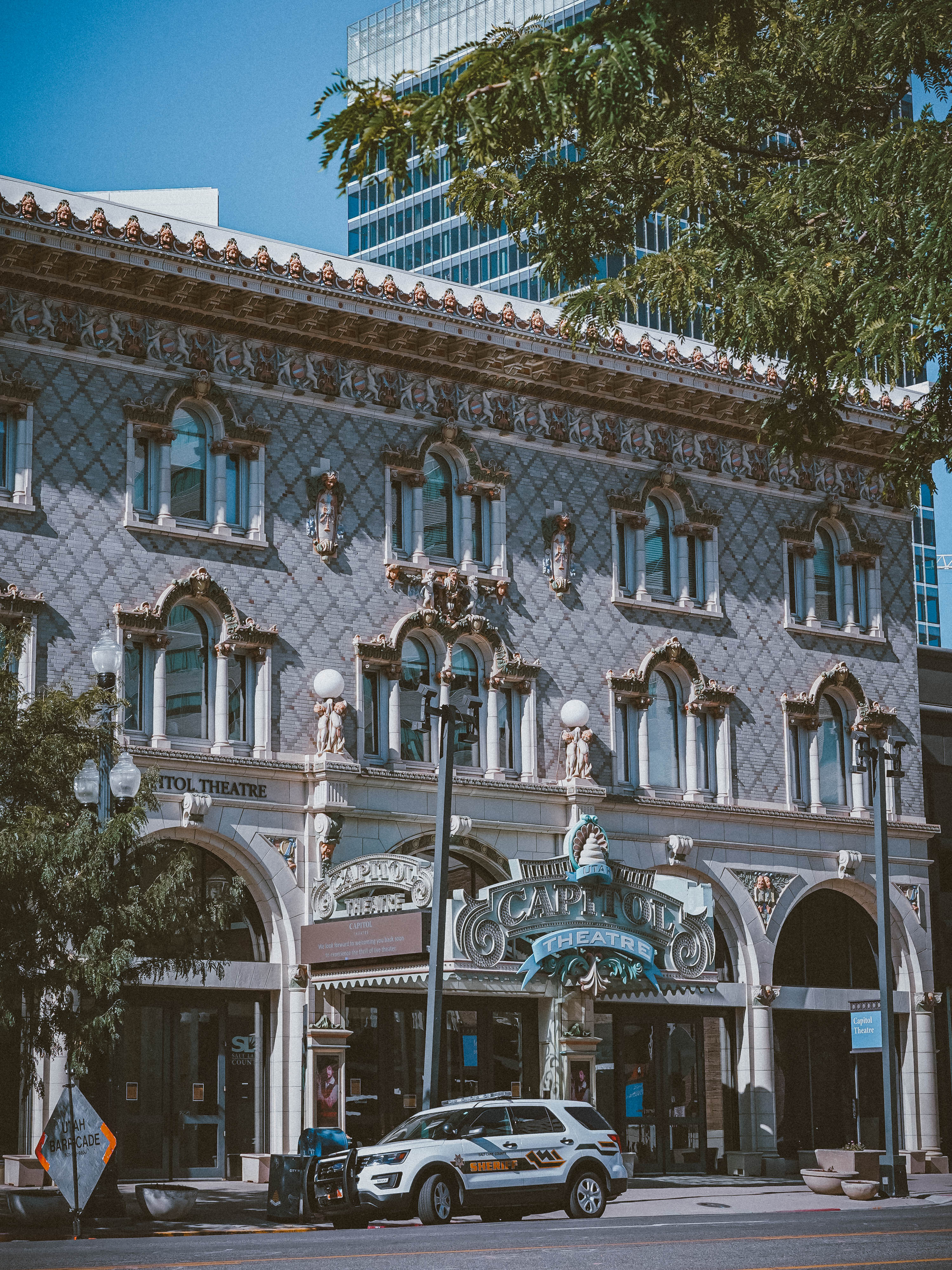
- The Capitol Theatre, formerly known as the Orpheum Theatre
- Interactive map of Janet Quinney Lawson Capitol Theatre
- Address: 50 West 200 South; Salt Lake City, Utah; United States
- Coordinates: 40.7652°N 111.8928°W
- Seating type: Reserved
- Capacity: 1,876
- Type: Performing arts

Construction
- Opened: August 2, 1913

Website
- Official website

The Capitol Theatre (also known as the Janet Quinney Lawson Capitol Theatre) is a historic performing arts venue in Downtown Salt Lake City, Utah. Originally opened in 1913 as the Orpheum Theatre, it was renamed the Capitol Theatre in 1927 following the dissolution of the Orpheum Circuit. The building was designed in the Italian Renaissance Revival and Beaux Arts architectural styles.

The theater serves as a major performance venue for several Utah-based arts organizations, including Ballet West, Utah Opera, and the Children's Dance Theater (Tanner Dance at the University of Utah). It also hosts touring productions through Broadway Across America. Notable past performances include the White Oak Dance Project in 1993, produced by Mikhail Baryshnikov and Mark Morris.

During the 2002 Winter Olympics, the theater was a venue for the Olympic Arts Festival.

After the Eccles Theater opened on Main Street in 2016, some productions moved there because of its larger stage and more advanced sound system. Nevertheless, the Capitol Theatre remains an active venue for ballet, opera, and theatrical productions.

The theater is managed by the Salt Lake County Center for the Arts.

== Renovations ==
The Capitol Theatre has undergone several major renovations.

After sustaining fire damage in 1949, the theater underwent a major renovation in 1975, funded by an $8.6 million county bond. The project included extensive upgrades to the building and auditorium, reaffirming the venue's status as one of downtown Salt Lake City's premier performing arts centers.

In 2013, a $32 million renovation project began which included the construction of the adjacent Jessie Eccles Quinney Ballet Centre. This addition expanded the lobby, added new rehearsal rooms, costume facilities, and administrative offices for Ballet West.

In 2019, the auditorium underwent a renovation lasting six-months. Work included:

- Replacing the main auditorium floor
- Installing new seating to meet ADA requirements
- Upgrading the sound system and theater infrastructure
- Restoring the roof to its original terracotta façade

This renovation was the second phase of planned improvements that began in 2013; the first stage had focused on the orchestra pit, stage, and backstage areas.
