= A Coffin in Egypt =

Chamber opera by composer Ricky Ian Gordon

- chamber opera by Ricky Ian Gordon
- Librettist: Leonard Foglia
- Based on: A Coffin in Egypt by Horton Foote
- Premiere: March 2014; Wortham Theater Center, Houston

A Coffin in Egypt is a chamber opera in one act by composer Ricky Ian Gordon. The work uses an English language libretto by Leonard Foglia which is based on a 1980 play by Horton Foote. Set in Egypt, Texas, the work tells the story of Myrtle Bledsoe, an embittered 90-year-old woman who sifts through the memories of her past in a quest for self-forgiveness. The opera had its world premiere at the Houston Grand Opera (HGO) in March 2014.

A Coffin in Egypt was jointly commissioned by the HGO, Opera Philadelphia, and the Wallis Annenberg Center for the Performing Arts. The work was specifically written as a starring vehicle for mezzo-soprano Frederica von Stade. While the work includes a cast of nine, it is essentially a monodrama in that the heroine is the only role with a substantial amount of singing. The other parts are spoken rather than sung lines apart from a few moments when a gospel quartet is used to "underscore key moments, rather in the manner of a Greek chorus". Von Stade reprised the role of Myrtle for performances in Philadelphia in June 2014, with the Chicago Opera Theater in April 2015 and in the Appel Room at Jazz at Lincoln Center in New York City in February 2016.
