= Home Fires (Katz book) =

1992 American book

- First edition
- Author: Don Katz
- Language: English
- Publisher: HarperCollins
- Publication date: 1992
- Publication place: United States
- Media type: Print
- Pages: 619
- ISBN: 978-0-06-019009-5

Home Fires: An Intimate Portrait of One Middle-Class Family in Postwar America is a narrative nonfiction book by Don Katz. Originally published in 1992, it was reissued in 2014 in ebook and audiobook formats with a new introduction by Jonathan Alter. The book covers the lives of the Gordons, an American family with many familiar experiences and struggles, including a move from the city to the suburbs, and four rebellious children. One of the grown children, Susan Gordon Lydon, wrote her own memoir in parallel, published the next year: Take The Long Way Home: Memoirs Of A Survivor.

== Summary ==
Home Fires tells the story of the Gordon family – real people, names unchanged – over nearly five decades, from the end of World War II to the early 1990s. The book chronicles the turbulent postwar era, illuminating the interplay between private life and profound cultural changes. Juxtaposing day-to-day family life with landmark public events, Home Fires is a revealing portrait of the second half of the 20th century in America

Members of the family profiled include siblings composer Ricky Ian Gordon and writer Susan Lydon.

== Reception ==
Home Fires received widespread critical acclaim. Publishers Weekly described it as a "moving, perceptive social history" and "riveting reading." The New York Times called it "mesmerizing, important" and Glamour called it "a flat-out marvel of reportage." Author Jonathan Alter, who also wrote the introduction for the 2014 edition, wrote "Katz's familial lens on recent history belongs on a shelf with classics. There is Balzac here, and Theodore Dreiser, with a touch of John Gunther, John Dos Passos and William Manchester."

== Awards and honors ==
Home Fires was nominated for a National Book Critics Circle Award in 1992.
