= Fake orgasm =

Behavior where a person pretends to have an orgasm

A fake orgasm occurs when a person pretends to have an orgasm without actually experiencing one. It usually involves simulating or acting out behaviors typically associated with orgasm, such as body movements, vocal sounds, and sequences of intensification followed by apparent release. It can also include giving verbal indications that orgasm occurred.

== Sex differences ==
While all genders fake orgasms, women fake orgasms more frequently than men. A survey of 180 male and 101 female college students (introductory psychology students from the University of Kansas), Muehlenhard & Shippee (2009) found that 25% of men and 50% of women had pretended to orgasm (28% and 67%, respectively, for participants with experience in penile–vaginal intercourse (PVI)). Although most fake orgasms occurred during PVI, some participants also reported them during oral sex, manual sex, and phone sex. The ABC News 2004 "American Sex Survey", a random-sample telephone poll of 1,501 Americans, showed that 48% of women and 11% of men faked orgasms. A 2012 joint survey of men's lifestyle site AskMen and women's lifestyle site TresSugar (now PopSugar) found that 34% of men and 54% of women had at some point faked an orgasm; 26% of women said they faked an orgasm every time they had sex. Other studies have found that anywhere from 25 to 74% of women admit to faking an orgasm at some point in their lives. This is more than the 25 percent of women who, according to Psychology Today in 2010, reported consistently having an orgasm during coitus. Women tend to achieve orgasm during intercourse less readily than men because most women require direct clitoral stimulation to achieve orgasm, and not all sexual positions provide access to the clitoris, which can make orgasms difficult to achieve for women. For women in heterosexual relationships, faking an orgasm can also be rooted in deference to their partner, need for their approval, or feelings of shame or sexual inadequacy. As there appears to be 'a sexual script in which women should orgasm before men, and men are responsible for women's orgasms', a woman may feel pressured to fake an orgasm before her partner in order to please them and avoid hurting their feelings.

Men fake orgasms for several reasons. Some fail to orgasm, but fake climax in order to avoid hurting their partner's feelings. Also, some men may wish to end intercourse, but believe that sex must necessarily end with a man orgasming, and so fake an orgasm to fulfill that. For men, it is more difficult to fake an orgasm, since ejaculation usually accompanies orgasm in males, and their partners can usually see whether or not this happens. Faking orgasms in men becomes easier while using condoms. In rare cases, a man is worried that the condom is torn or will tear, and that he will unintentionally make his partner pregnant, and so he fakes an orgasm in order to avoid ejaculation.

== Brain activity ==
In a 2005 University of Groningen study conducted by Gert Holstege and Janniko R. Georgiadis, the brain activity of 24 men and women (12 couples) was observed in an MRI scanner in different circumstances. For the female participants, their brain was scanned in four states: simply resting, faking an orgasm, having their clitoris stimulated by their male partner's fingers, and clitoral stimulation to the point of orgasm. Brain scans found that, when women were tasked to fake an orgasm, the female brain centres that control conscious movement remained active, whereas when they experienced real orgasms, all activity disappeared from the movement control centres, and the light from the emotional centres of the brain went out as well. With the exception of some Brodmann areas of the cerebral cortex (which only showed activation in men), the same brain regions were activated or shut down in men and women during real orgasms (although the female orgasm was found to be longer and more intense on average).

According to a PET study by Huynh et al. (2013) the dorsolateral (left) side of the pontine tegmentum area was always activated whenever women had a real orgasm, attempted but failed to have an orgasm, and imitated (faked) an orgasm, whereas the ventrolateral (right) side of the pontine tegmentum was only activated when women had a real orgasm.

== Other factors ==
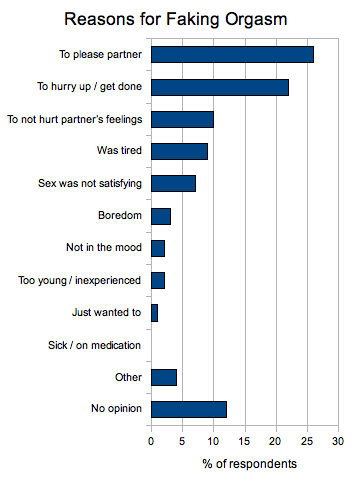
Reasons for faking orgasm based on ABC News 2004 "The American Sex Survey" poll

Orgasm is not always achieved easily during sexual activity. For both sexes, the condition of being unable to orgasm during sex is known as anorgasmia; it can be caused by a variety of factors, including factors in one's life such as stress, anxiety, depression, or fatigue, as well as factors related to the sex itself; including worry, guilt, fear of painful intercourse, fear of pregnancy, the undesirability of a partner, and the undesirability of a setting. It can also be caused by drug use, including alcohol and other substances, or side effects from prescription drugs.

People can fake orgasms for number of reasons, such as when their partner wants them to orgasm but they are unable, or when they desire to stop having sex but are not comfortable telling their partner directly, avoiding negative consequences, or for pleasing their partner.

That women should fake an orgasm was, about the year 2 AD, recommended by the Roman poet Ovid in his famous book Ars Amatoria:

So, then, my dear ones, feel the pleasure in the very marrow of your bones; share it fairly with your lover, say pleasant, naughty things the while. And if Nature has withheld from you the sensation of pleasure, then teach your lips to lie and say you feel it all. Unhappy is the woman who feels no answering thrill. But, if you have to pretend, don't betray yourself by over-acting. Let your movements and your eyes combine to deceive us, and, gasping, panting, complete the illusion.

Patricia Watson (2002) noted that, although a preceding line (sentiat ex imis Venerem resoluta medullis / femina, et ex aequo res iuuet illa duos) advises that women should enjoy sex, too, the context shows that Ovid was primarily concerned with male sexual satisfaction: he recommended which sexual positions would make the woman most appealing to the man, and that if the woman was unable to orgasm, she should at least fake it for her male lover's enjoyment.

People can also fake orgasms for reasons of display or presentation, such as during phone sex, or in pornography.

Feminists researchers have asserted that women faking orgasms is a sign of male-centered sexuality; in a society that celebrates only male sexual pleasure, women may feel pressured to engage in acts that bring their male partners to orgasm but that do not provide them physical pleasure. Women in a discussion group in 1967 analyzed their motivations for faking orgasms and decided that faking was a response to these pressures. As such, the urge to fake an orgasm often sits in a broader context of other problems with sexual repression and orgasm imperative, the idea that orgasm (both male and female) is a necessary component for a successful or validated sexual experience. Many of these women also experienced feelings such as sexual rejection by their partners, or on the other hand, unwanted sexual attention; some were afraid to tell their partners what they wanted, and others said their partners resented being told what they wanted.

Another factor could be anti-feminist values and the defense of traditional gender roles. A study revealed that women with anti-feminist values or who perpetuated ambivalent sexism, were more likely to fake orgasms than those with feminist or progressist values, those who rejected this practice because it goes against her belief in a woman's right to pleasure.

Hugo M. Mialon developed a game theoretical analysis of faking orgasms as a signaling game. Only some of the predictions of his model were consistent with survey data used to check the validity of the model. Among other things, the survey data suggested that both women and men who would be more concerned if their partner were faking are less likely to fake themselves, and that older women and men are more likely to fake than younger ones.

One study of orgasm found that women who fake orgasms were more likely to neglect their partners and flirt with other men at social gatherings. The authors of this study speculated that women who fake orgasms may be more likely to engage in sexual intercourse with men other than their partner, although they recommended caution at interpreting their findings due to a small data set and a large number of variables being studied. Other study revealed women with higher incomes than their partner are twice as likely to fake orgasms and have a lower rate of sexual satisfaction. Perceived masculine fragility also increases fake orgasms and decreases satisfaction.

In therapy or counseling, women are more likely to inaccurately portray their sexual behavior (such as by claiming to orgasm when they do not) to a male therapist than to a female one, although women may still withhold the same information from female therapists.

== Evolutionary perspective ==
From an evolutionary perspective, females might fake orgasms in order to signal fidelity to a male partner, particularly if he is of low-genetic quality. If a female has sex with many partners (employing a polygamous mating strategy), her aim may be to secure benefits from multiple males, such as resources, whilst aiming to only reproduce with males of high-genetic quality. In order to secure resources from low-genetic males, the female would need to imply commitment to reproduction with each male, as males do not want to waste resources on a female who may not sire their child.

A true orgasm is known to increase the number of sperm carried to the uterus post-male orgasm (suggesting reproductive benefits) and has suggested pair-bonding benefits. Faking an orgasm with a low-genetic quality mate would lead that mate to believe that: a) they could be the father of a child born to that mother and b) that the female is committed to them and them alone, because she appears satisfied.

A fake orgasm could also be a mate-retention technique, as research has indicated that women who perceive a greater risk of infidelity from their partner report a greater number of faked orgasms. This behavior would be beneficial for the female in retaining a long-term mate, as women who appear to have frequent orgasms have partners that report higher levels of satisfaction in their relationship, in comparison to women that do not orgasm as frequently. Some research has indicated that women who fake orgasm frequently have also been shown to display other mate retention behaviors, which include:

- Mate guarding (e.g. paying attention to who the partner is spending time with and often checking up on them);
- Inter-sexual negative inducements (flirting with another individual whilst their partner is looking);
- Positive inducements (e.g. dressing in a certain manner to impress their partner)
- Displaying possession signals in public (e.g., kissing a partner in view of other females who are seen as a threat); and,
- Intra-sexual negative inducements (e.g., displaying aggressive behavior towards another female who is caught looking at their partner).

The frequency to which these other forms of mate retention occur is directly related to the risk of infidelity; limited research indicates that once the risk of infidelity is controlled for, the prevalence of other mate retention behaviors are greatly reduced.

Fake orgasm has also been shown to function as a mate-retention technique when the female, as opposed to the male, has a higher risk of infidelity. For example, it has been suggested that a main function of female orgasm is to retain the sperm of a favored partner, therefore it is advantageous for men to pay attention to their partners orgasm to ensure they have been selected. Men who are heavily invested in their relationship would experience greater costs in potential cuckoldry and sperm competition. Consequently, in situations where the woman has a perceived high risk of infidelity, men may be especially interested in ensuring their partner attains a copulatory orgasm. Due to this attentiveness, women may fake an orgasm in order to manipulate their level of commitment signalling mate selection to their partner. Commitment manipulation is a mate-retention technique in itself, often displayed by a partner when there is a perceived risk of infidelity. While research has shown that 25 percent of males also display fake orgasms, there is limited research into this area with no current evidence suggesting that men fake an orgasm to retain a mate. The main reasons men gave for faking an orgasm is that they wanted the sex to end as achieving orgasm was unlikely but did not want to hurt the feelings of their partner.

A study of orgasms in female humans suggested that most men are quite accurate in knowing whether their partners faked orgasm or not. In this study, accuracy was varied (for example, one man suggesting that his partner never faked orgasm, and his partner suggesting that she faked orgasm 100 percent of the time), but the general moderate accuracy of men in detecting fake orgasm suggests that it may be an evolutionary counter-adaptation by men in order to not be fooled into believing female attempts at implying commitment (monogamy) and in order to detect the true satisfaction levels of the female partner. The idea that men place great importance on female mate orgasm lends support to this theory.

== In the media ==
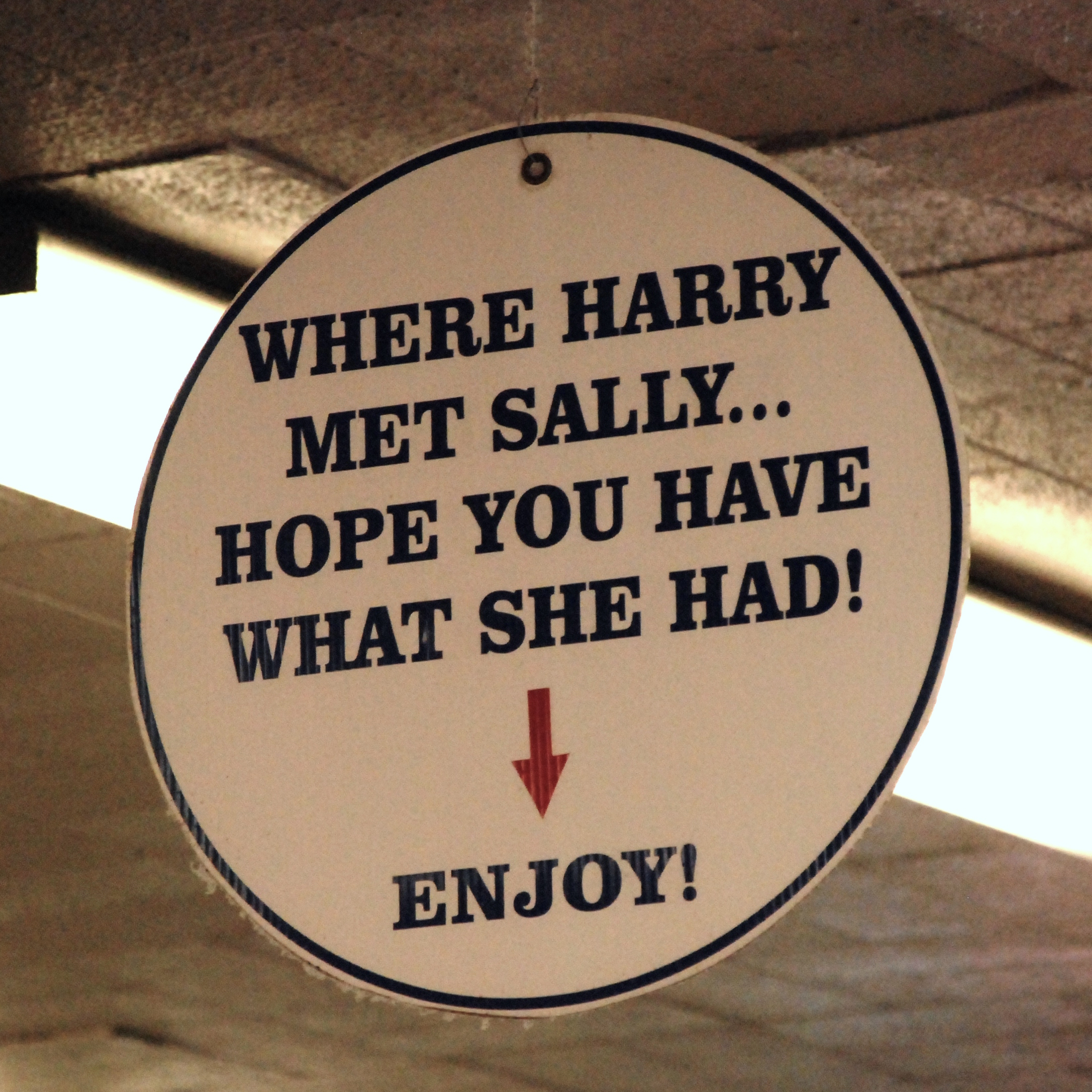
Katz's Deli sign above the table where the fake orgasm occurred in the film When Harry Met Sally...

The topic of fake orgasm was brought to the mainstream in 1970 by Susan Lydon, who published "The Politics of Orgasm" in Ramparts magazine. She wrote, "With their men, they often fake orgasm to appear 'good in bed' and thus place an intolerable physical burden on themselves and a psychological burden on the men unlucky enough to see through the ruse." Newspapers and radio talk shows debated her work. Women began to demand equal rights in bed, insisting that their pleasure was its own goal.

The 1989 American film When Harry Met Sally... is well known for a scene in which the character Sally, played by Meg Ryan, fakes an orgasm while sitting in a crowded deli in order to demonstrate how persuasive a fake orgasm can be.

In "The Mango" episode of the American sitcom television program Seinfeld, the main characters Elaine and Kramer admit to faking orgasms, and another main character, George, becomes paranoid that his own girlfriend has been faking orgasms based on Elaine's admission that she faked orgasms "all the time" while with Jerry, who subsequently becomes desperate to have orgasmic sex with Elaine in order to "save the friendship."

== See also ==
- Delayed ejaculation
- Female ejaculation
