= A Place to Call Home (opera) =

A Place To Call Home is a contemporary American opera composed by Edward Barnes who also wrote the libretto. The work was commissioned by the Los Angeles Opera and premiered at the John Anson Ford Theater during the summer of 1993. The Los Angeles Opera later toured the opera, with further productions by the University of Texas at El Paso, among others.

Synopsis: The opera is an account of four different teenage refugees/immigrants to the United States. It is based on interviews conducted by Edward Barnes with teenage refugees from El Salvador, Iran, Cambodia and Angola.

Cast: Woman 1 (soprano); Woman 2 (mezzo-soprano); Man 1 (tenor); Man 2 (baritone); other immigrants, refugees, high school students, high school teachers, street gang, barrio kids (chorus)

Duration: 60 minutes

Orchestration: Electric keyboards (2 players) and percussion (1 player)
