= The Grapes of Wrath (opera) =

2007 opera by Ricky Ian Gordon

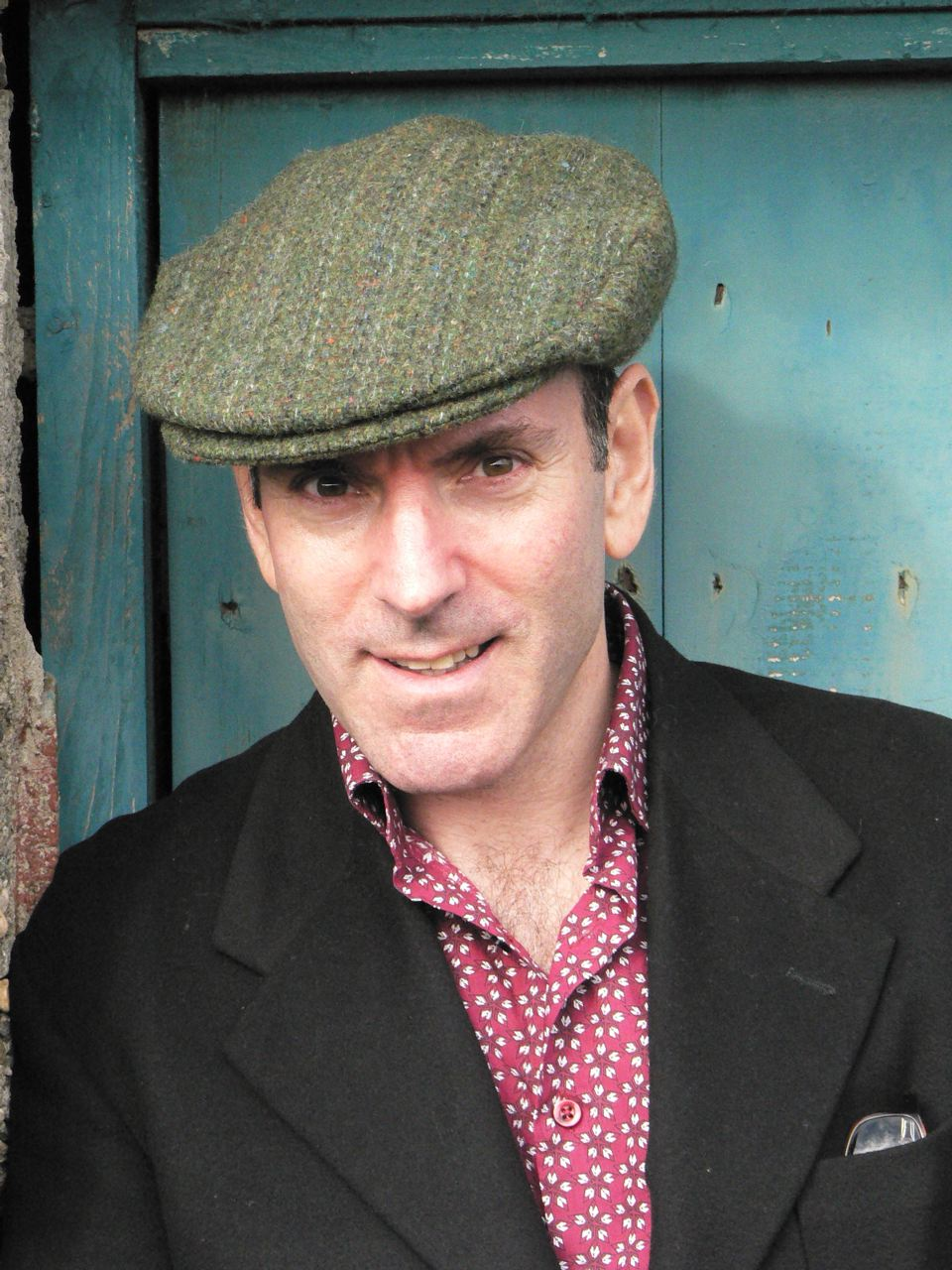
Ricky Ian Gordon, the composer of The Grapes of Wrath

The Grapes of Wrath is an opera in three acts composed by Ricky Ian Gordon to a libretto by Michael Korie based on John Steinbeck’s 1939 novel of the same title. It premiered on February 10, 2007 at the Ordway Center for the Performing Arts in Saint Paul, Minnesota in a production by Minnesota Opera. The work has been revised in subsequent years and has also been performed as a two-act concert version.

== Background and performance history ==
Originally commissioned by the Minnesota Opera and co-produced with Utah Symphony – Utah Opera, the Minnesota Opera production had its premiere February 10, 2007, at the Ordway Center for the Performing Arts in Saint Paul, Minnesota conducted by Grant Gershon. The world premiere broadcast was heard on Minnesota Public Radio on September 19, 2007. Utah Symphony – Utah Opera subsequently performed the work (in a modified version) on May 12–20, 2007, at the Capitol Theatre in Salt Lake City. A revised version of the opera was performed by Pittsburgh Opera in November, 2008. Its collegiate premiere was performed at the Moores School of Music of the University of Houston in April, 2009. A greatly revised concert version of the opera (in two acts) was given its New York premiere by The Collegiate Chorale at Carnegie Hall on March 22, 2010, with Ted Sperling conducting the American Symphony Orchestra and a narration performed by Jane Fonda. In April 2011, the Opera was presented by the Michigan State University College of Music Opera Theater, directed by Melanie Helton and conducted by Raphael Jimenez. This performance was in collaboration with Gordon's residency at Michigan State. In February 2013, the opera found its Chicago premiere at Northwestern University through the Bienen School of Music. The production was directed by Michael Ehrman, conducted by Hal France, and featured guest baritone Robert Orth reprising his role of Uncle John, which he sang with the premiere cast in 2007. Opera Theatre of St. Louis premiered a reduced, two-act version of the opera in May 2017. For this new version, the composer said that he went for "a more cinematic approach" and "even wrote some new music."

== Roles and premiere cast ==
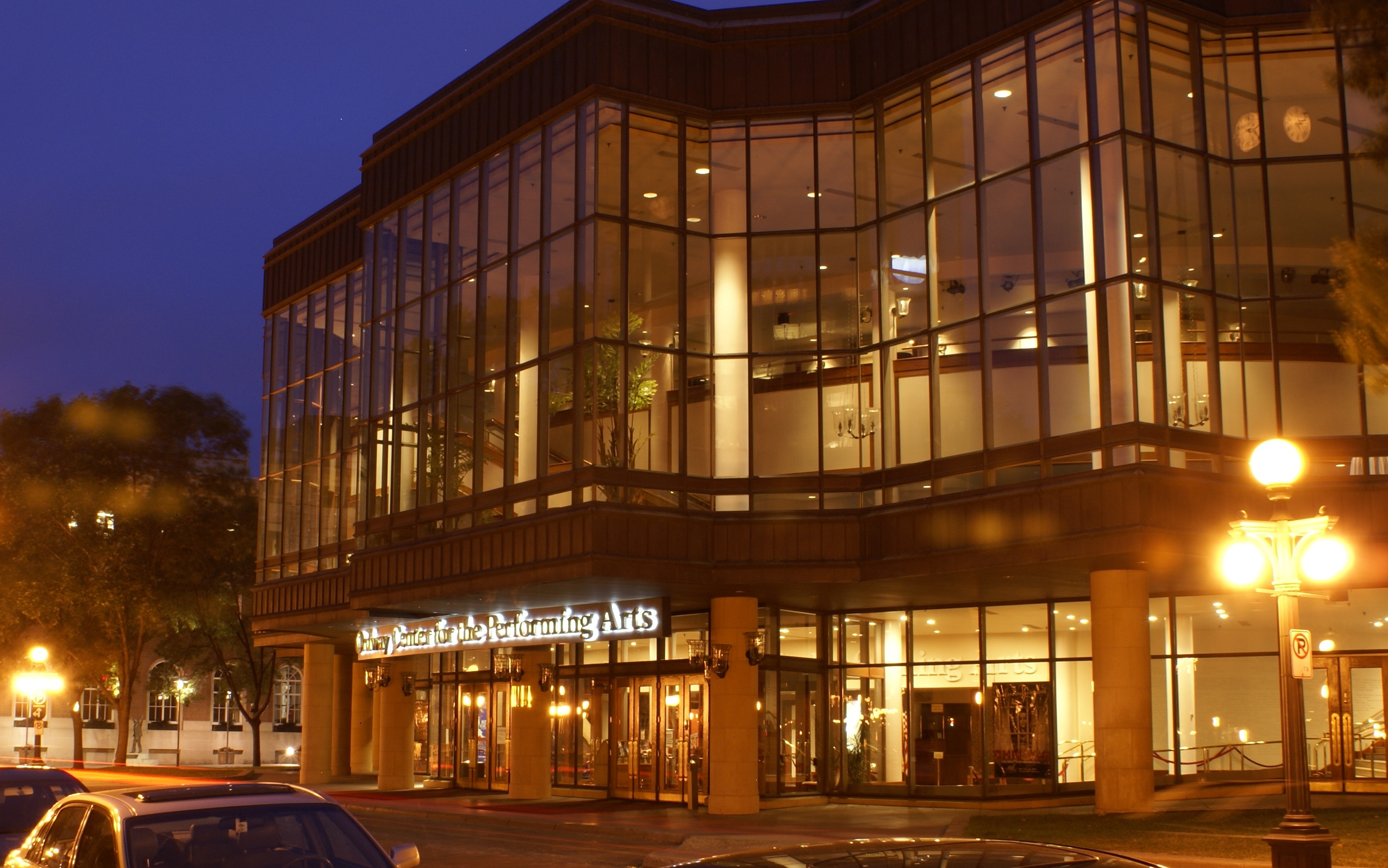
Ordway Center for the Performing Arts in Saint Paul, Minnesota where The Grapes of Wrath had its world premiere

Role	Voice type	Premiere cast, 10 February 2007 (Conductor: Grant Gershon)
Tom Joad, a released prisoner	baritone	Brian Leerhuber
Ma Joad, family matriarch	mezzo-soprano	Deanne Meek
Rosasharn, Tom’s pregnant sister	soprano	Kelly Kaduce
Jim Casy, a lapsed preacher	tenor	Roger Honeywell
Pa Joad, a tenant farmer	baritone	Peter Halverson
Uncle John, Pa's brother	baritone	Robert Orth
Granma, Pa and John’s mother	mezzo-soprano	Rosalind Elias
Grampa, her husband	tenor	Dan Dressen
Noah, Tom's slow-witted brother	bass-baritone	Andrew Wilkowske
Al, their younger brother	tenor	Joshua Kohl
Ruthie, their younger sister	(child)	Maeve Moynihan
Winfield, their younger brother	(child)	Henry Bushnell
Connie Rivers, Rosasharn's husband	baritone	Jesse Blumberg
Muley Graves/George Endicott	tenor	Theodore Chletsos
Mae	mezzo-soprano	Anna Jablonski
Ragged Man	baritone	Kelly Markgraf
Woman	soprano	Karin Wolverton
Man	baritone	Greg Pearson

Production team

- Stage director and dramaturg – Eric Simonson
- Set designer – Allen Moyer
- Costume designer – Kärin Kopischke
- Lighting designer – Robert Wierzel
- Projections designer – Wendall K. Harrington
- Sound designer – C Andrew Mayer
- Choreographer – Doug Varone
- Wig master and makeup – Tom Watson & Associates
- Stage manager – Alexander Farino

== Synopsis ==
Setting: Oklahoma, Southwestern United States, and California in the mid-1930s

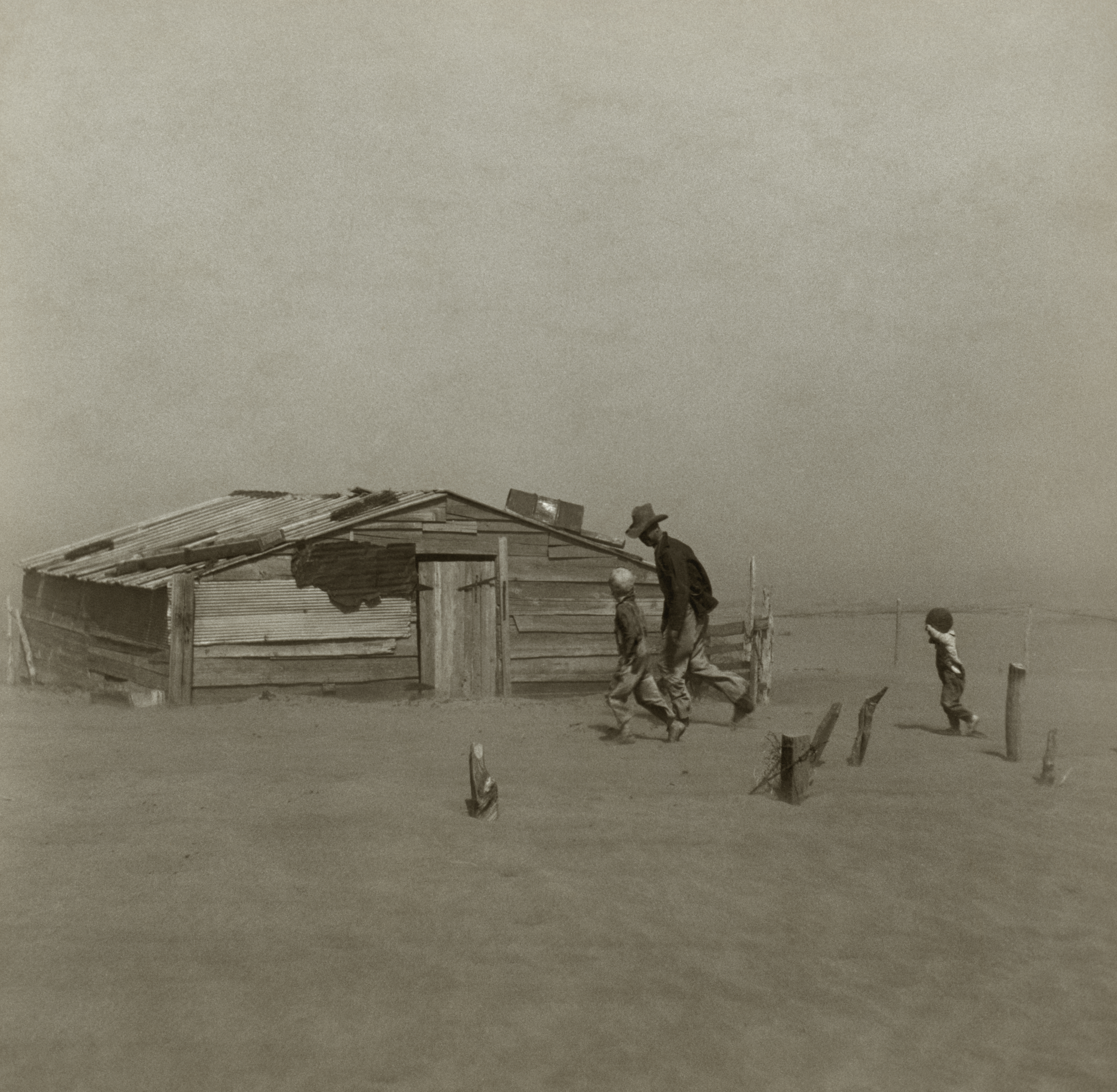
A farmer and his two sons during a dust storm in Cimarron County, Oklahoma, 1936, Photo: Arthur Rothstein

Prologue

The sharecroppers recall the devastation of their native Oklahoma lands, brought about by drought and economic depression.

Act 1

Having been released early from prison on parole for good behavior, Tom Joad meets up with Jim Casy, a lapsed preacher. When they get to the deserted and destroyed Joad family farm, they discover that the bank has foreclosed on it. Tom and Jim decide to accompany the family to California, where fruit picking jobs are supposed to be plenty. Al Joad buys an old truck, and the family loads up the few possessions they can take. Connie and Rosasharn dream of a new life and home for Moses, their unborn baby. The next day the Joads bury Grampa, who has died during the night. The family then continues their journey down Route 66.

Act 2

At a diner, the Joads experiences contempt from the truckers and waitresses when they try to buy only the food they can afford, but the diner owner and waitress decide to act out of compassion. Crossing the Mojave, Granma dies during the night, but Ma keeps her death a secret until they get to California. At the Endicott Farm, the scene flashes back to 1849, when George Endicott plants his first plum tree. In the present time, growers inform the Joads that there's no work there. Another flash to 1924: George Endicott, the grandson, has become a successful businessman. Back in the present, the locals rally – with the influx of Okie laborers, their wages have been slashed. Nearby, plums are being burned, rather than being given to the hungry croppers. The Joads continue on to a Hooverville – a squalid shantytown. Ma struggles to keep the family together. Connie regrets leaving Oklahoma and storms off, never to return. The next day, the Joad men get involved with unscrupulous contractors. A woman is killed in the struggle, and Tom knocks a deputy unconscious, violating parole. Casy volunteers to stay behind and take the blame as the Joads escape to the truck. Noah Joad, feeling himself a burden on the family, goes to the creek and drowns himself.

Act 3

Newly relocated at a clean, self-policing government camp, the Joads feel like people again. Local farm owners send in agitators to cause a fight during a hoedown so they can close down the camp, but the croppers remain peaceful. Pa persuades the Joads to go to a new farm. They realize that they have been brought in as scabs, triggering a riot outside the camp. Tom meets up with Jim Casy, now an agitator for farm workers' rights. When Casy is bludgeoned to death by a deputy, Tom kills him and goes into hiding. The remaining Joads find work picking cotton and taking shelter in a boxcar. During the rainy season, Rosasharn goes into labor, but delivers a stillborn child. Ma asks Uncle John to go bury Moses while Rosasharn recovers to ease her pain; Uncle John instead chooses to cast Moses' dead body into the river so that everyone can see "the fruits of their blindness." The raging river has flooded the remaining Joads out of their home. The truck is swept away in the water, and Al is lost when he goes after it. Ma, Pa, Ruthie, Winfield, and a very weak Rosasharn seek refuge in a barn, where they find a boy and his starving father. Ma intuitively knows what Rosasharn must do, and ushers everyone else outside. Rosasharn nourishes the starving man with milk from her breast.

== Musical scenes ==
Act 1

1. "The Last Time There Was Rain" – Ensemble
2. "I Keep My Nose Clean" – Tom
3. "So Long Savior"/"I Baptized You"/"Naked Tree" – Jim Casy, Tom
4. "Gone" – Tom, Muley Graves
5. "Not My Fault" – Ensemble, Muley Graves
6. "Dusty Road"/"Promise Me, Tommy"/"Tricky Old Devil" – Family
7. "Good Machine" – Ensemble, Al
8. "Us" – Ma
9. "The Plenty Road" – Okies ensemble, Tom, Family
10. "Handbills"/"I Can't Tell You"/"We'll Find Work" – Ensemble, Ragged Man, Pa
11. "The Zephyr"/"One Star" – Connie, Rosasharn
12. "He Don't Understand" – Family
13. "A Word for This Old Man" – Jim Casy
14. Reprise, "Us" Act 1 Finale – Ma, Tom, Ensemble

Act 2

1. "Truck Drivers" – Mae, Ensemble
2. "Dry Blue Night"/"We Can Be Quiet"/"Rest Peaceful, Mama" – Uncle John, Jim Casy, Tom, Al, Ma, Connie, Rosasharn
3. "Inspection Station" – Ma, Tom, Al
4. "Like They Promised" – Family
5. "Endicott Farm"/"My Plum Tree" – Ensemble, George J. Endicott, Family
6. "The Fire in the Orchard" – Ensemble, Tom
7. "Hooverville"/Hoovervile's Anywhere"/"No One is Goin'" – Ma, Al, Connie, Rosasharn
8. "The Next Morning" – Ensemble, Family
9. "Tent and Truck" – Ma, Rosasharn, Noah
10. "The Creek"/"I Can Be a Help" – Noah, Ma, Ensemble

Act 3

1. "People Again" – Ruthie, Winfield, Ma, Rosasharn, Ensemble
2. "Square Dance" – Pa, Uncle John, Ensemble
3. "Fried Dough" – Ma, Tom
4. "Join the Line" – Ensemble
5. "Riot at Hooper Ranch" – Ensemble, Family
6. "Dry Blue Night"/"Things Turn Around" – Al, Tom, Jim Casy
7. "Dios te salve" – Ensemble, Ma
8. "I'll Be There" – Ma, Tom
9. "The Day the Rain Began" – Ensemble
10. "Boxcar" – Ma, Uncle John
11. "Little Dead Moses" – Uncle John, Ensemble
12. "Barn Road... Night" – Ma, Rosasharn

== Revised concert version ==
The revised two-act concert version premiered at Carnegie Hall in New York City on March 22, 2010, with Ted Sperling conducting the American Symphony Orchestra and the Collegiate Chorale.

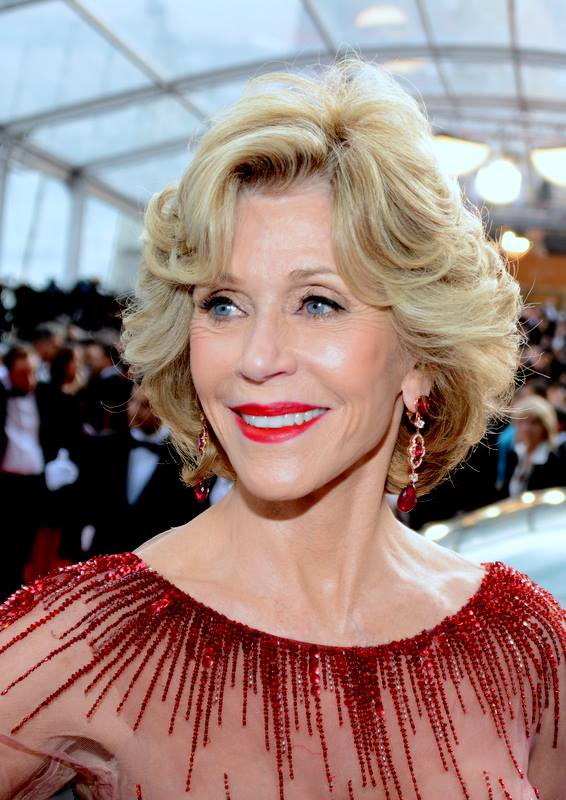
Jane Fonda, narrator for the premiere of the revised two-act concert version

Cast

- Narrator – Jane Fonda
- Tom Joad – Nathan Gunn
- Ma Joad – Victoria Clark
- Rosaharn – Elizabeth Futral
- Jim Casey – Sean Panikkar
- Pa Joad – Peter Halverson
- Uncle John – Stephen Powell
- Noah – Andrew Wilkowske
- Al – Steven Pasquale
- Ruthie – Madelyn Gunn
- Winfield – Alex Schwartz
- Mae – Christine Ebersole
- Ragged Man/Connie/Truck Driver – Matthew Worth

Production team

- Director – Eric Simonson
- Production designer Wendall Harrington
- Lighting designer – Frances Aronson

== The Grapes of Wrath Solo Aria Collection ==
A song book featuring 16 arias from Grapes of Wrath was published by Carl Fischer Music in 2010. Some are expanded versions of arias which were shortened or cut in the most recent edition of the opera.

1. "I Keep My Nose Clean" – Tom
2. "So Long Savior"/"Naked Tree" – Jim Casy
3. "Promise Me, Tommy" – Ma
4. "Sit Quiet, Grampa"- Granma
5. "Us" – Ma
6. "I Can't Tell You" – Ragged Man
7. "One Star" – Rosasharn
8. "A Word For This Old Man" – Jim Casy
9. "Truck Drivers" – Mae
10. "Hooverville" – Al
11. "I Can Be a Help" – Noah
12. "Simple Child" – Ma
13. "Fried Dough" – Ma
14. "Things Turn Around" – Jim Casy
15. "I'll Be There" – Tom
16. "Little Dead Moses" – Uncle John

== Recordings ==
- The Grapes of Wrath, original cast recording, PS Classics CD66
