= Opera Columbus =

- Opera Association of Central Ohio
- Abbreviation: OC
- Formation: 1981
- Type: Non-profit organization
- Services: Opera company
- Key people: Julia Noulin-Mérat (General Director and CEO)
- Budget: $2M
- Website: operacolumbus.org

Opera Columbus (Opera Association of Central Ohio, OC) is an American professional opera company in Columbus, Ohio, founded in 1981, and is a member of Opera America. OC employs nearly 350 artists and creative professionals annually—vocalists, artisans, stagehands, costumers, and scenic designers—many of whom are members of the Columbus community.

== Productions ==
The company currently offers three to four fully staged opera productions and an educational outreach program during an annual season that runs from September through May, one of which is a featured new work. Performances are offered in Downtown Columbus and in partnership with the Columbus Association for the Performing Arts.

Opera Columbus collaborates with other organizations, including Against the Grain Theatre (Toronto), Apollo's Fire Baroque Orchestra (Cleveland), BalletMet (Columbus), the Banff Centre for Arts and Creativity, the Columbus Symphony Orchestra, Company XIV (New York), and ProMusica Chamber Orchestra (Columbus).

== History ==
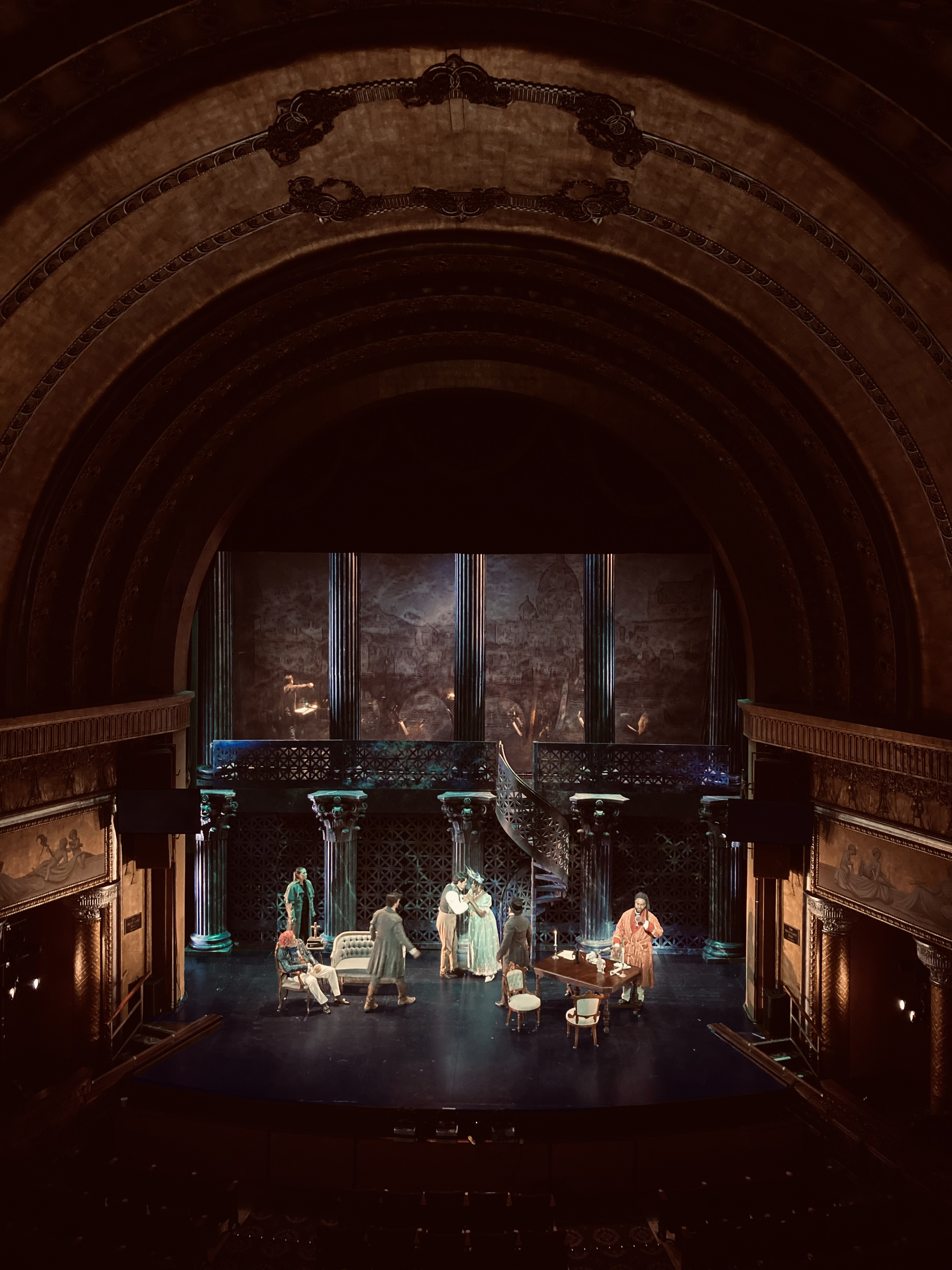
Tosca, Opera Columbus

Opera Columbus was chartered in September 1981 with productions of Tosca, Il trovatore, and Don Giovanni, in the same year. Its current general director and CEO is Julia Noulin-Mérat, having begun her tenure with the 2021 season.

Opera Columbus has an artistic collaboration with the Artist Diploma for Opera Studies (ADOS) program at the Juilliard School. Launched in 2016–2017, this collaboration is bringing Juilliard ADOS artists to Columbus to perform in principal roles in Opera Columbus' mainstage productions. In addition to fulfilling Opera Columbus' mission to support and develop emerging talent, this relationship also benefits local audiences, bringing such artists to the Columbus stage, often in their role debuts.

Their K-12 education programs include in-school children's opera performances and workshops, Southern Theatre tours, student discount tickets, and new programs like concerts in the classroom and opera rehearsals.

In 2021, Opera Columbus announced their inaugural Crane Directing Fellowship specifically for underrepresented artists. In 2023, the OC board announced they were extending Julia Noulin-Mérat's contract for another 2 years (5 total). In 2024, Opera Columbus named Dr Everett McCorvey its inaugural principal guest conductor with a three-year contract.

Opera Columbus is a non-profit organization overseen by an independent board of directors with an operating budget of $1.7M. Its main offices are located in the Ohio Theatre building at 55 E. State St. Their mantra is "Make it Yours".

== World premieres ==
- Vanqui (1999) is a tale of death and resurrection through the eyes of the heroine, Vanqui, a 19th-century enslaved woman. The original music is by Leslie Savoy Burrs and the libretto by John A. Williams.
- The Flood, a new work co-produced and co-commissioned with ProMusica Chamber Orchestra, dives into the history of Columbus through the emotional storytelling of Stephen Wadsworth and the composition of Korine Fujiwara.
- "Vanqui", a 90 minutes edition, 2022
- "Alice Tierney", by composer Melissa Dunphy and librettist Jacqueline Goldfinger, follows four archeologists who unearth clues to the mysterious death of Alice Tierney in Colonial Philadelphia, developed with Oberlin Opera, 2023
- "A Magic Flute immersive experience: The Temple", conceived by Julia Noulin-Mérat, by composer Amadeus Mozart + Que Jones and librettist Que Jones, 2024.

== Repertory ==
- 1980–81 Tosca (Puccini); Il trovatore (Verdi); Don Giovanni (Mozart)
- 1982–83 La traviata (Verdi); The Tales of Hoffmann (Offenbach); Lucia di Lammermoor (Donizetti)
- 1983–84 Cavalleria rusticana (Mascagni); Pagliacci (Leoncavallo); La Cenerentola (Rossini)
- 1984–85 Un ballo in maschera (Verdi); Roméo et Juliette (Gounod); La bohème (Puccini); Porgy and Bess (Gershwin)
- 1985–86 Il barbiere di Siviglia (Rossini); Aida (Verdi); Three Sisters (Pasatieri); Man of La Mancha Leigh & Darion
- 1986–87 Macbeth (Verdi); L'elisir d'amore (Donizetti); Babes in Toyland (Herbert); Madama Butterfly (Puccini); Porgy and Bess (Gershwin)
- 1987–88 La traviata (Verdi); Tristan und Isolde (Wagner); Babes in Toyland (Herbert); La fanciulla del West (Puccini); Die Fledermaus (J. Strauss II)
- 1989-1990: Carmen (Bizet), Boris Godunov (Mussorgsky), II trovatore (Verdi)
- 1990-1991: Rigoletti (Verdi), Der Rosenkavalier (R. Strauss), Le nozze di Figaro (Mozart)
- 1991-1992: Turandot (Puccini), The Magic Flute (Mozart), The Merry Widow (Lehar)
- 1992-1993: Madama Butterfly (Puccini), Fidelio (Beethoven), Cosi fan tutte (Mozart)
- 1993-1994: II barbiere di Siviglia (Rossini), La traviata (Verdi), Ariadne auf Naxos (R. Strauss)
- 1994-1995: La Bohème (Puccini), The Tales of Hoffmann (Offenbach), L’elisir d’amore (Donizetti)
- 1995-1996: Lucia di Lammermoor (Donizetti), Salome (R. Strauss), L’italiana in Algeri (Rossini)
- 1996-1997: Carmen (Bizet), Nabucco (Verdi), La Cenerentola (Rossini)
- 1997-1998: Tosca (Puccini), Anna Bolena (Donizetti), The Abduction from the Seragli (Mozart)
- 1998-1999: Faust (Gounod), The Flying Dutchman (Wagner), The Coronation of Poppea (Monteverdi)
- 1999-2000: Macbeth (Verdi), Madama Butterfly (Puccini), Vanqui (Burrs)
- 2000-2001: La traviata (Verdi), Die Fledermaus (J. Strauss), Le nozze di Figaro (Mozart)
- 2001-2002: The Gondoliers, or The Duke of Barataria (Gilbert & Sullivan), The Merry Widow (Lehar), Rigoletto (Verdi), La bohème (Puccini), The Daughter of the Regiment (Donizetti), Somebody's Children (Kander)
- 2002-2003: The Pirates of Penzance, or The Slave of Duty (Gilbert & Sullivan), Man of La Mancha (Leigh & Darion), Tosca (Puccini), The Magic Flute (Mozart), Brundibar (Krasa)
- 2003-2004: HMS Pinafore, or The Lass That Loved a Sailor (Gilbert & Sullivan), Camelot (Lerner & Loewe), Carmen (Bizet), Il barbiere di Siviglia (Rossini), Lolanthe or The Peer and the Peri (Gilbert & Sullivan), The Student Prince (Romberg)
- 2004-2005: Porgy and Bess (Gershwin), Don Giovanni (Mozart), Susannah (Floyd)
- 2005-2006: Aida (Verdi), Hansel and Gretel (Humperdinck), Madama Butterfly (Puccini), Threepenny Opera (Weill)
- 2006-2007: La traviata (Verdi), The Merry Widow (Lehar)
- 2007-2008: La bohème (Puccini), La Cenerentola (Rossini)
- 2008-2009: The Pearl Fishers (Bizet), Turandot (Puccini), Mikado (Sullivan)
- 2009-2010: Pagliacci (Leoncavallo), Romeo & Juliet (Gounod)
- 2010-2011: Berlin to Broadway (Weill), Marriage of Figaro (Mozart), Pirates of Penzance (Sullivan)
- 2011-2012: Don Giovanni (Mozart), Mikado (Sullivan)
- 2012-2013: The Magic Flute (Mozart), H.M.S. Pinafore (Gilbert & Sullivan), La bohème (Puccini)
- 2013-2014: Madama Butterfly (Puccini), Pirates of Penzance (Gilbert & Sullivan), Carmen (Bizet), The Merry Widow (Lehar)
- 2014-2015: Twisted, Marriage of Figaro (Mozart), La Voix Humaine and Pagliacci (Poulenc)
- 2015-2016: Armide (Lully), La bohème (Puccini), La traviata (Verdi)
- 2016-2017: Twisted 2, Mission: Seraglio (Mozart), Carmen (Bizet)
- 2017-2018: The Turn of the Screw (Britten), Aida (Verdi), Orphee et Eurydice (Gluck)
- 2018-2019: Madama Butterfly (Puccini), The Flood (Fujiwara), Opera Swings Jazz
- 2019-2020: Twisted 3, As One (Kaminsky), The Barber of Seville (Rossini)
- 2021: Ryan Speedo Green Residency, Don Giovanni (Mozart), La bohème (Puccini)
- 2021-2022: Tosca (Puccini), Fellow Travelers (Spears), 40 days of opera Festival including: The Puppy Episode -virtual (Recio), Vanqui - 90 minutes version (Burrs), La traviata -immersive (Verdi).
- 2022-2023: La Cenerentola (Rossini), Maria de Buenos Aires (Piazzolla), Rigoletto (Verdi), Alice Tierney (Dunphy)
- 2023-2024: Carmen (Bizet), Eugene Onegin (Tchaikovsky), A Magic Flute immersive experience: The Temple (Mozart + Jones)
- 2024-2025: The Threepenny Opera (Weill), West Side Story (Bernstein), Marriage of Figaro (Mozart)
- 2025-2026: Rappaccini’s Daughter (Catán) , The Old Man and the Sea (Prestini) , The Anonymous Lover (Chevalier) , La traviata (Verdi)
- 2026-2027: Pirates! The Penzance Musical, Messiah-sing-along, Fanciulla del West, The Shining

== CRANE Directing Fellow ==
The Crane Directing Fellowship, inaugurated for the 2021-2022 season, was created explicitly to advance the careers of underrepresented stage directors by creating early-career opportunities to gain hands-on experience assisting and directing main stage productions.

- 2021-22 Luther Lewis III
- 2022-23 Sarah Dahnke
- 2023-25 Brandon Shaw McKnight, 2 years residency
- 2025-26 Vanessa Ogbuehi

== Leadership History ==
- Evan Whallon Artistic Director 1981-1982
- Vivian F. Zoë Executive Manager 1982-1983
- Lee Schaenen Artistic Director 1982-1984
- Michael Harrison General Director 1983-1989
- John Gage General Director 1989-1991
- William Russell General Director 1991-2002
- Philip Dobard General Director 2002-2006
- William Boggs Artistic Director 2002-2011
- Press Southworth Executive Director 2006-2011
- William Conner Managing Director & CEO 2011-2016
- Peggy Kriha Artistic Director 2014-2017
- Chad Whittington Executive Director 2016-2017
- Peggy Kriha General and Artistic Director 2017-2019
- Peggy Kriha General Director + CEO 2019-2020
- Julia Noulin-Mérat General Director + CEO 2021-present

== See also ==
- Cincinnati Opera
- OPERA America
