= Orgasm imperative =

Orgasm as a primary measure of sexual satisfaction

The orgasm imperative or orgasmic imperative refers to the societal pressure to experience or facilitate an orgasm during sexual intercourse, which is derived from the idea that it is a necessary component for a successful or validated sexual experience. This pressure can manifest as individuals feeling obligated to produce an orgasm, or feeling that their partner's failure to climax during sex is a failure of the sexual encounter itself. To a lesser extent, the term orgasmocentrism has been used.

This concept highlights how societal norms and expectations can shape our understanding of what constitutes "good" or "valid" sex. It is a characteristic of hegemonic sexuality, focused more on appearance than enjoyment; generally, this applies to sexual relations, although it can also occur in solo masturbation. While orgasm is a healthy aspect of human sexuality, experts do not recommend treating it as the preferred measure of pleasure, but rather as another expression of it.

== General description ==
The term highlights the societal expectations surrounding orgasms in sexual relationships. It suggests that the absence of an orgasm can lead to negative feelings or interpretations about the quality of the sexual experience or the relationship itself. This pressure can be particularly acute for women, who may feel pressured to achieve orgasm, even if it's not a desired outcome. Sex therapists have argued that an excessive focus on achieving orgasm is destructive, causing sex to be seen as an activity in which a goal or objective is achieved, rather than something pleasurable.

Orgasm imperative is often linked to broader societal narratives about sex and pleasure, which can sometimes prioritize certain aspects of sexual experience over others. For example, the "coital imperative," which emphasizes vaginal-penile intercourse, can sometimes overshadow the importance of other forms of sexual pleasure and exploration. Additionally, the "male orgasm imperative" can put pressure on men to focus on their own pleasure and potentially hinder their partners' ability to experience orgasm.

Some researchers and advocates are pushing for a broader understanding of sexual pleasure, moving away from a sole focus on orgasm and towards exploring a wider range of sexual experiences.
