= Don Katz =

Founder of Audible.com, author, journalist

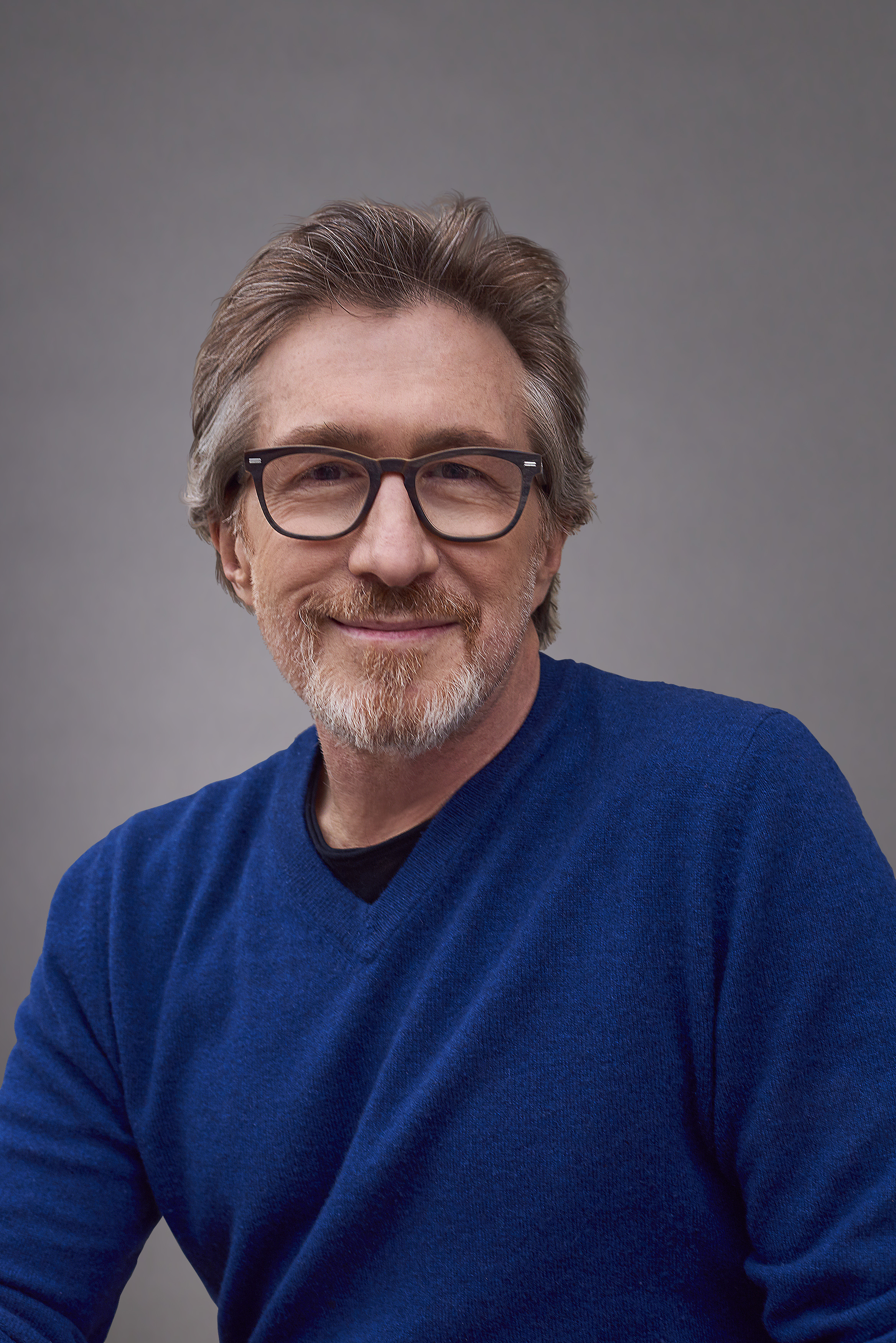
- Don Katz
- Born: Donald R. Katz; January 30, 1952 (age 74); Chicago, Illinois, U.S.
- Education: New York University
- Occupations: Founder of Audible.com, author, and journalist
- Website: www.donald-katz.com

Donald R. Katz (born January 30, 1952) is an American author and businessman.

He is the founder and longtime CEO of Audible, Inc. Founded in 1995 and headquartered in Newark, New Jersey, Audible.com offers audiobooks and similar products. Audible also introduced the first widely-used portable digital audio player in 1997, four years before the introduction of the iPod. In 2004, Katz was awarded the Ernst & Young Entrepreneur of the Year Award for New Jersey. Audible was a publicly traded Nasdaq company until it was acquired and became a subsidiary of Amazon.com in early 2008. Audible operates digital storefronts in the US, UK, Germany, France, Australia, Italy, Japan, Canada, India and Spain.

Named one of NJ.com's "25 Most Influential People in New Jersey" in 2016, Katz has also been recognized as one of America's Top 25 Disruptive Leaders by Living Cities for his work on behalf of urban transformation in Newark. Katz was the recipient of a Tribeca Disruptive Innovation Award in 2013. In 2022, Katz was named a PEN America Business Visionary Honoree and was awarded the Innovator Tribute at the Gotham Awards.

Katz also founded Newark Venture Partners (NVP), a venture fund focused on creating a high-tech innovation hub in Newark. The fund is housed in Audible's headquarters and provides capital, company-building services and residence to innovative tech startups. The fund's inaugural accelerator class launched September 2016.

Katz served as Audible's CEO until January 2020, after which he held the title of founder and executive chairman until 2022.

== Biography ==
Katz was born in Chicago, Illinois on January 30, 1952. He graduated from New York University in 1974, where he studied with Ralph Ellison, who had been made Albert Schweitzer Professor of Humanities. Katz credits his idea to work in the field of audiobooks to studying under Ellison, with his emphasis on literature being something more than text and something that should be heard and performed, saying "I studied literature with Ralph as much as I read his work and talked about writing… Audible is testament, in many ways, to what I learned from him." He also attended The University of Chicago as well as The London School of Economics, from which he holds an MSc in Economics. He lives in Montclair, New Jersey, is married and has three children.

== Writing career ==
Katz was an author and journalist for twenty years, before founding Audible

Katz served as a contributing editor for Rolling Stone, Esquire, Outside, Sports Illustrated, Men's Journal and Worth. He received an Overseas Press Club award for his coverage of foreign affairs, and his writing won or was nominated for several National Magazine Awards. A two-volume collection of Katz's award-winning magazine stories was published in 2001 as, King of the Ferret Leggers and Other True Stories and Valley of the Fallen and Other Places. '

His book Home Fires: An Intimate Portrait of One Middle-Class Family in Postwar America (1992), was nominated for a National Book Critics Circle Award. Home Fires was reissued in 2014 in audiobook and ebook formats, featuring a new introduction by Jonathan Alter.

The Big Store: Inside the Crisis and Revolution at Sears (1987) won the Chicago Tribune Heartland Prize for Nonfiction.

Just Do It: The Nike Spirit in the Corporate World was published in 1994.

== Impact work ==
Katz’s work in Newark, New Jersey, spans decades. In 2007, Don moved Audible’s global headquarters from suburban New Jersey to downtown Newark, the largest city in the state, to be part of the city’s renaissance. Today, Audible is the fastest-growing private employer in the city, with more than 1,900 employees in its Newark offices and hundreds more globally.

“I consider the Newark move one of the best decisions we’ve made as a company,” Don has said.

Under Katz’s leadership, Audible launched the Global Center for Urban Development in September 2020. The center’s goal is to expand the company’s community and economic initiatives and launch new models focused on advancing equality, racial justice, and economic empowerment. The center brings together all equitable community aspirations at Audible under a single organization, from existing community projects in Newark to new efforts around urban innovation, to improve the lives of those in the cities and countries in which Audible operates.

One of Audible’s five People Principles, written by Katz, is “Activate Caring.” It says: “We work to improve the lives of those without privilege in the cities and countries in which we operate, because Audible seeks to exemplify what a company can mean beyond what it does.”

In 2019, Audible opened its Innovation Cathedral, converting a historic, 80,000 square-foot church and community center into a workspace that houses hundreds of engineers, product managers, and other workers.

Under Katz, Audible's programs have included:

Newark Working Kitchens: The Audible-led COVID-19 response has activated dozens of local restaurants to cook and serve meals for low-income seniors and families and people without homes. The program has served more than 1.5 million meals.

Community hiring: Audible identifies, hires and trains Newark residents without traditional resumes by partnering with community organizations.

Paid internships: Newark high school students work side-by-side with Audible technologists, recruiters, data scientists, and sound engineers as paid interns. Once they go to college, they receive a monthly scholarship from Audible and return to work during breaks. All of Audible’s paid high school interns have been accepted to two- or four-year colleges.

Live Local: Audible provides a $500 monthly subsidy to employees living in Newark to encourage active participation in the city’s life.

Katz also served as a member of the public library board in Montclair, New Jersey for nine years and on the board of Uncommon Schools, a nonprofit organization that manages several urban college preparatory charter schools.

== Works ==
- The King of the Ferret Leggers and Other True Stories. 2001. ISBN 978-0-679-64702-7
- The Valley of the Fallen and Other Places. 2001. ISBN 978-0-679-64722-5
- Just Do It: The Nike Spirit in the Corporate World. 1994. ISBN 978-1-55850-479-0
- Home Fires: An Intimate Portrait of One Middle-Class Family in Postwar America. 1992, 2014. ISBN 0060190094
- The Big Store: Inside the Crisis and Revolution at Sears. 1987. ISBN 978-0-14-011525-3
