= Ricky Ian Gordon =

American composer (born 1956)

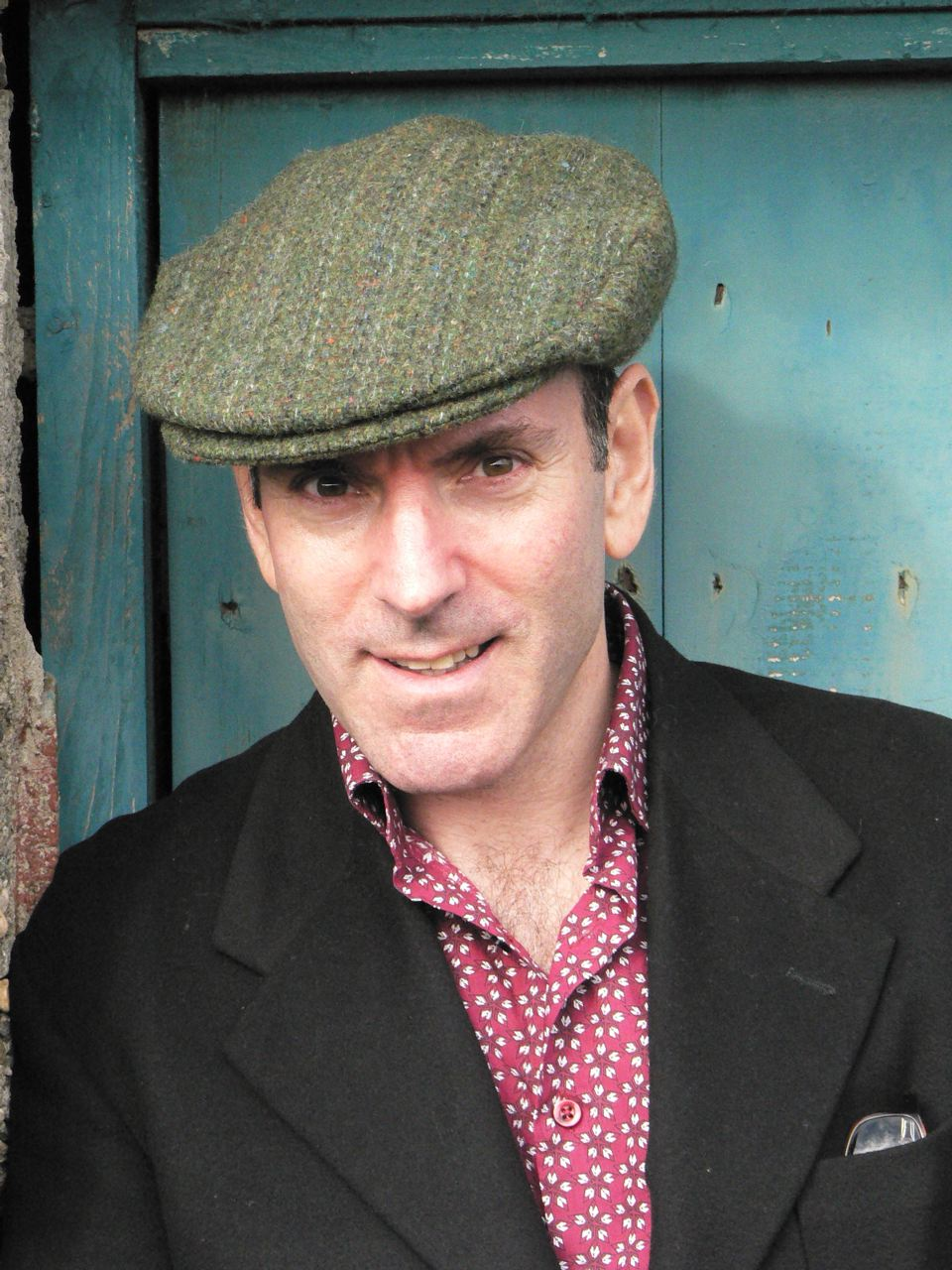
- Ricky Ian Gordon

Background information
- Born: Ricky Ian Gordon; May 15, 1956 (age 70); Oceanside, New York, United States
- Genres: Musical theatre, Opera
- Occupations: Composer, lyricist
- Years active: 1956–present
- Website: www.rickyiangordon.com

Ricky Ian Gordon (born May 15, 1956) is an American composer of art song, opera and musical theatre.

== Life ==
Gordon was born in Oceanside, New York. He was raised by his mother, Eve, and father, Sam, and he grew up on Long Island with his three sisters, Susan, Lorraine and Sheila. Donald Katz based his book, Home Fires: An Intimate Portrait of One Middle-Class Family in Postwar America, on Gordon's family life. Gordon attended Carnegie Mellon University.

== Work ==
The death of his lover from AIDS inspired Dream True (1998), Orpheus and Euridice (2005) and the song cycle Green Sneakers for Baritone, String Quartet, Empty Chair and Piano (2007). He has composed several operas and had his music performed by Audra McDonald, Dawn Upshaw, Renée Fleming, Todd Palmer and others.

In 1992 Gordon set ten of Langston Hughes's poems to music for Harolyn Blackwell. In February 2007, Gordon's opera, The Grapes of Wrath, premiered in Saint Paul, Minnesota. The opera was co-commissioned and co-produced by the Minnesota Opera and the Utah Symphony & Opera. In 2011 he wrote the music for Rappahannock County, a staged revue of twenty one songs about the Civil War, commissioned by the Virginia Arts Festival.

In 2003, he wrote a musical based on selections from The Remembrance of Things Past by Marcel Proust. It was titled My Life with Albertine and featured Kelli O'Hara in her first starring role.

He was commissioned by the Opera Theatre of Saint Louis for what became 27 (2014), an opera about Gertrude Stein and Alice B. Toklas and their life at 27 rue de Fleurus, as a work to star mezzo-soprano Stephanie Blythe. Royce Vavrek wrote the libretto. The piece made its New York premiere on Oct. 20, 2016.

In 2010, he released an album called A Horse With Wings in which he sang a collection of his art songs. In 2014 his opera A Coffin in Egypt had its world premiere at the Houston Grand Opera.

He premiered his opera Morning Star at Cincinnati Opera in 2015. This opera follows a Russian Jewish family that immigrates to New York City in 1910.

Gordon's opera The House Without a Christmas Tree had its world premiere at the Houston Grand Opera on November 30, 2017.

The world premiere of Gordon's The Garden of the Finzi-Continis opened in January 2022. It is a co-production between National Yiddish Theatre Folksbiene and the New York City Opera.

His newest opera was, again, commissioned by the Opera Theatre of Saint Louis. This House, opening May 31, 2025, is about the Walker family and their life in a Harlem brownstone since the 1920s. Lynn Nottage and Ruby Aiyo Gerber wrote the libretto.

== Assessment ==
Gordon's songwriting is steeped in the traditions of cabaret and musical theater, while his choice of themes has been idiosyncratic. Green Sneakers for Baritone, String Quartet, Empty Chair and Piano has been described as "a significant contribution to the culture sprung from the AIDS crisis", notable for its elegiac quality as well as its restraint. His opera The Grapes of Wrath, based on the novel by John Steinbeck, has been cited for achieving "instant success that is rare for an American opera."
