= Corrine Grad Coleman =

American women's rights activist (1927–2004)

Corrine Grad Coleman (1927–2004) was an American writer and women's rights activist. She was a founding member of the women's liberation organization Redstockings and helped to write the group's manifesto. She was also a member of New York Radical Women. She participated in the 1968 Miss America protest and the occupation of the offices of Ladies' Home Journal in 1970. She was a co-founder and editor of the literary magazine Feelings: A Journal of Women's Liberation. As a freelance writer, her works were published in the Village Voice and The Brooklyn Phoenix. Coleman graduated from New York University and taught English in New York public schools.

== Early life and education ==
Corrine Grad was born in The Bronx on June 30, 1927. She earned her bachelor's and master's degrees from New York University.

== Career and activism ==
Coleman taught English in public schools in New York. According to Kathie Sarachild, Coleman's interest in feminism stemmed from reading Simone de Beauvoir's The Second Sex. She was also a freelance writer and poet, with her works published in the Village Voice and The Brooklyn Phoenix.

In the late 1960s, Coleman was active in the women's liberation movement. She was a member of the second-wave radical feminist organization New York Radical Women, which had its beginnings in 1967. In 1968, Coleman participated in a women's liberation protest organized by the New York Radical Women against that year's Miss America pageant. In November 1968, she attended the national Women's Liberation Conference in Lake Villa, Illinois and conducted a workshop on 'Alternatives to Marriage'.

Alongside Shulamith Firestone and Ellen Willis, she founded the radical women's liberation organization Redstockings, an offshoot of New York Radical Women. She one of the editors of the Redstockings Manifesto of July 7, 1969. She was a leader of the hundred feminists who occupied the offices of the women's magazine Ladies' Home Journal for a day in 1970, demanding that the magazine release an issue on women's liberation. Coleman was a co-founder of the literary magazine Feelings: A Journal of Women's Liberation and served as its editor. Some of her poetry is included in the magazine.

Coleman was married to Joseph K. Coleman and had four children. Anticipating her 1977 divorce from him, she devised guidelines for making the process of divorce equitable for women and wrote an article about divorce for the Ladies' Home Journal.

At a memorial for Simone de Beauvoir in New York in 1986, Coleman was among the women who spoke and gave testimonies. She died of heart disease on July 4, 2004, in Manhattan.
