= Marjorie Kramer =

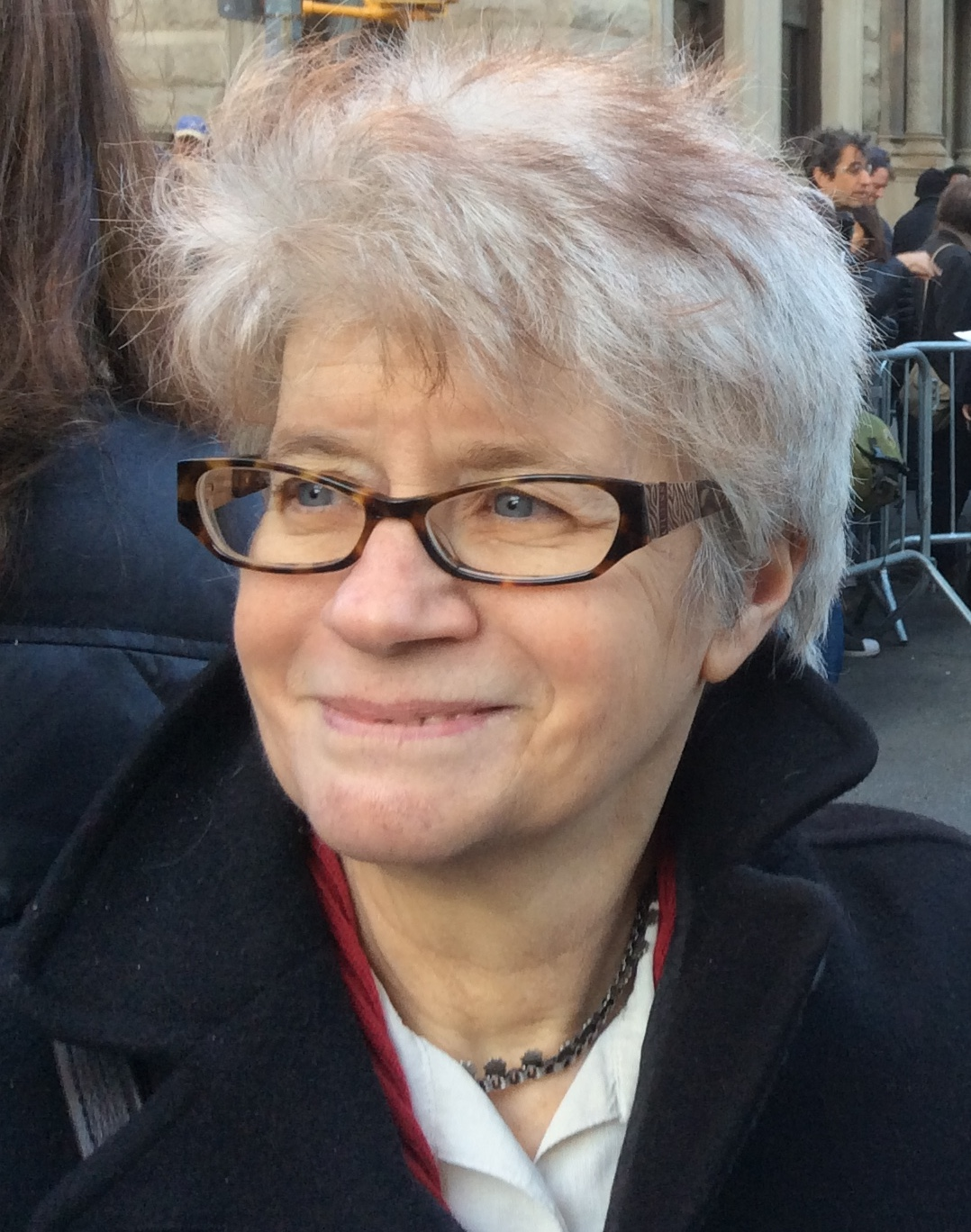
Portrait of Marjorie Kramer

Marjorie Kramer (born 1943 in Englewood, New Jersey) is an American figurative painter of al fresco landscapes and feminist self-portraits.

== Early life and feminism ==
Kramer was raised in Greenwich, Connecticut. She has a Bachelor of Fine Arts from Cooper Union and was a founding student in 1964 at the New York Studio School of Drawing, Painting and Sculpture, and studied with Mercedes Matter, Charles Cajori and Louis Finkelstein. She donated a portion of her small inheritance to pay the School’s first month’s rent of $500.

Kramer was a founding editor with Irene Peslikis and others of the Woman and Art Quarterly (1969–71), the first women artists' publication. From 1968 to 1973, Kramer organized shows of work by women artists, including SoHo Women's Artists in a Canal Street loft with Women Artists in Revolution (WAR) and Feminist Art at Columbia University with Patricia Mainardi. With these friends, she participated in New York Radical Women in 1968 and in January 1969 was involved in the founding of the radical feminist collective Redstockings. In their first press, The Village Voice reported that the women felt they were taking charge of their own bodies finally. Kramer’s response was First Self Portrait (1970). The expression on her face led Larry Campbell, in ARTnews to write of a plucky artist with attitude.

In 1971, Kramer combined her art and politics in Open Show of Feminist Art at a space run by Art Workers Coalition called MUSEUM: A Project of Living Artists at 729 Broadway, which was supported by a New York State grant; she put ads in alternative weeklies and posted flyers downtown saying that ALL woman artists were welcome with a $1.50 donation to help cover the costs. It was only woman because they do not get chances to show their work, Kramer told the Daily News, which called the group the "Anti-Oppressionists." Among the roughly 125 participating artists were Alice Neel, Faith Ringgold, and Gretna Campbell; another participant, Juanita McNeely hauled a large painting about menstruation to the show, hung it herself, and thought, "I felt immediate love and at home. We women artists were no longer alone." Lawrence Alloway wrote that this show affirmed the artists' control over their own work, a necessity in the anti-authoritarian women’s movement.

Alice Neel, at 71, could not transport her paintings to the show, so Kramer and Noah Baen picked them up. Neel said they could take anything and they took her portrait of the outrageous Joe Gould, painted in 1933. Neel remarked that she had received little attention in the art world, and had never been in the Whitney Annual, which led Kramer to write a petition to the Whitney Museum about their exclusion of this major painter. Working on it with Baen and Cindy Nemser, they gathered 100 signatures of artists, which was instrumental in the staging of Neel’s Whitney retrospective in March 1974.

== Professional life ==
There were other one-woman shows throughout the eastern U.S. Ken Johnson, in a New York Times review, found Kramer to be a realist painter with a delicate painterly touch in her solo show at 55 Mercer. Group shows included the National Academy Museum and School, Grey Art Gallery at New York University, Dishman Art Museum, and others.

In 2003, Kramer was awarded the Veteran Feminists of America Medal in the Salute to Feminists in the Arts from the National Arts Club in New York. In 2007, she won a New York Studio School Painting Residency on Governors Island.

Kramer was a founding coordinator of the Artists' Choice Museum in New York in 1976.

== Artwork ==
Called a neomodernist for her observational rigor, her work was considered to have upset the traditional male subjects-system of self-portraiture.

Much of her landscape painting is from her current home in Northern Vermont, which has led her to working with the Vermont Progressive Party, which focuses on political equality and ecological policy with its members in the Legislature and in the Governor’s office. She was campaign manager for two of their nominees, as well as working with the local Community Supported Agriculture group for better stewardship of the land.
