= Miss America protest =

Demonstration held at the Miss America 1968

- Two women toss items into the Freedom Trash Can while a female reporter looks on.
- Date: September 7, 1968
- Duration: 1 pm to 12 midnight
- Venue: Miss America 1969
- Location: Atlantic City, New Jersey Boardwalk
- Also known as: No More Miss America
- Cause: Women's liberation
- Target: Miss America 1969
- Organised by: New York Radical Women
- Participants: New York Radical Women, Jeannette Rankin Brigade, National Organization for Women, American Civil Liberties Union

The Miss America protest was a demonstration held at the Miss America 1969 contest on September 7, 1968, attended by about 200 feminists and civil rights advocates. The feminist protest was organized by New York Radical Women and included putting symbolic feminine products into a "Freedom Trash Can" on the Atlantic City boardwalk, including bras, hairspray, makeup, girdles, corsets, false eyelashes, mops, and other items. The protesters also unfurled a large banner emblazoned with "Women's Liberation" inside the contest hall, drawing worldwide media attention to the Women's Liberation Movement.

Reporter Lindsy Van Gelder drew an analogy between the feminist protesters throwing bras in the trash cans and Vietnam War protesters who burned their draft cards. The bra-burning trope was permanently attached to the event and became a catch-phrase of the feminist era.

== Origins ==
The New York Radical Women was a group of women that had been active in the civil rights movement, the New Left, and antiwar movements. The group was organized in the fall of 1967 by former TV child star Robin Morgan, Carol Hanisch, Shulamith Firestone, and Pam Allen. They were searching for a suitable way to draw attention to their movement.

Hanisch said that she got the idea to target the Miss America contest after the group, including Morgan, Kathie Sarachild, Rosalyn Baxandall, Alix Kates Shulman, Patricia Mainardi, Irene Peslikis, and Ellen Willis, watched the film Schmeerguntz, which depicted how beauty standards oppressed women. It included clips of a Miss America parading in her swimsuit. "It got me thinking that protesting the pageant might be a good way to launch the movement into the public consciousness," Hanisch said. "Because up until this time, we hadn't done a lot of actions yet. We were a very small movement. It was kind of a gutsy thing to do. Miss America was this 'American pie' icon. Who would dare criticize this?" The group decided to incorporate the techniques successfully used by the civil rights movement and adapt it to the new idea of women's liberation.

=== Purpose ===
In a letter on August 29, 1968, to the city mayor, Morgan requested a permit. She explained that the purpose of the protest was to demonstrate their objections to the pageant's focus on women's bodies over their brains, "on youth rather than maturity, and on commercialism rather than humanity".

=== Organizers and participants ===
In her letter requesting a permit, Morgan named the sponsor of the protest as "Women's Liberation", a "loose coalition of small groups and individuals". She was the key organizer of the protest. The advisory sponsor was Florynce Kennedy's Media Workshop, an activist group she founded in 1966 to protest the media's representation of African Americans. Other members of New York Radical Women were involved in protesting and documenting the event. Bev Grant, a musician and filmmaker / photographer with Newsreel who took part in the protests, also shot film and took photos of the protests and of the pageant itself. Peggy Dobbins, a performer and activist, created a life-sized Miss America puppet which she displayed on the boardwalk in the guise of a carnival barker auctioning her off. Florika Remetier and Bonnie Allen were also symbolically chained to the puppet, with the chains representing those "that tie us to these beauty standards against our will". Participants also came from National Organization for Women, the feminist Jeannette Rankin Brigade and the American Civil Liberties Union. Men were barred from taking part.

The press release for the event contained sentiments that resonated well beyond the movement, such as “Miss America is a walking commercial for the pageant's sponsors. Wind her up and she plugs your product…” and “last year she went to Vietnam to pep-talk our husbands, fathers, sons and boyfriends into dying and killing with a better spirit…"

== Protest event ==
=== Atlantic City boardwalk ===
About 200 members of the group New York Radical Women traveled to Atlantic City in cars and chartered buses. On September 7, 1968, about 400 feminists from New York City, Florida, Boston, Detroit, and New Jersey gathered on the Atlantic City Boardwalk outside the Miss America Pageant. They protested what they called "The Degrading Mindless-Boob-Girlie Symbol" and American society's normative beauty expectations. They marched with signs, passed out pamphlets, including one titled No More Miss America, and crowned a live sheep—comparing the beauty pageant to livestock competitions at county fairs, including an illustration of a woman's figure marked up like a side of beef.

=== Freedom Trash Can ===
They threw a number of feminine products into a "Freedom Trash Can". These included mops, pots and pans, copies of Cosmopolitan and Playboy magazines, false eyelashes, high-heeled shoes, curlers, hairspray, makeup, girdles, corsets, and bras; items the protesters called "instruments of female torture" and accouterments of what they perceived to be enforced femininity.

Protesters saw the pageant and its symbols as oppressing women. They decried its emphasis on an arbitrary standard of beauty. They were against the labeling, public worship and exploitation of the "most beautiful girl in America." Sarachild, one of the protest organizers, reported that "huge crowds gathered for the picketing. People were grabbing our fliers out of our hands."

=== Protest inside pageant ===
Along with tossing the items into the trash can and distributing literature outside, four protesters including Kathie Sarachild and Carol Hanisch bought tickets and entered the hall. While the outgoing 1968 Miss America, Debra Barnes Snodgrass, was giving her farewell speech, the women unfurled a bedsheet from the balcony that said "Women's Liberation" and began to shout "women's liberation!" and "No more Miss America!" They got out a half-dozen shouts before they were quickly removed by police. While TV cameras at the event didn't show them, newspapers all around the country covered the protest. "I think it kind of made the phrase 'women's liberation' a household term," Sarachild says. "The media picked up on the bra part," Hanisch said later. "I often say that if they had called us 'girdle burners,' every woman in America would have run to join us."

Outgoing Miss America Snodgrass said that the protesters were diminishing the hard work of thousands of competitors who were attending school and had put a lot of effort into developing their talents.

== Origin of "bra-burning" ==
The dramatic, symbolic use of a trash can to dispose of feminine objects caught the media's attention. Protest organizer Hanisch said about the Freedom Trash Can afterward, "We had intended to burn it, but the police department, since we were on the boardwalk, wouldn't let us do the burning." A story by Lindsy Van Gelder in the New York Post carried a headline "Bra Burners and Miss America". Her story drew an analogy between the feminist protest and Vietnam War protesters who burned their draft cards. Individuals who were present said that no one burned a bra nor did anyone take off her bra.

However, respected author Joseph Campbell found a local news story reporting that articles were in fact burned, and a witness corroborating the news story. The article and the witness contradicted the feminists' statements, stating that lingerie was in fact burned at least briefly that day. An article on page 4 of the Atlantic City Press reported, "Bra-burners blitz boardwalk". It stated, "As the bras, girdles, falsies, curlers, and copies of popular women's magazines burned in the Freedom Trash Can, the demonstration reached the pinnacle of ridicule when the participants paraded a small lamb wearing a gold banner worded Miss America." A second story in the same newspaper written by Jon Katz did not mention burning lingerie, but Campbell interviewed Katz. Katz, who was present that day, confirmed that bras and other items had been set on fire: "...the fire was small, and quickly was extinguished." The feminists insisted afterward that the story was wrong.

Deborah J. Cohan, an associate professor of sociology at the University of South Carolina, Beaufort, believes that bra-burning has become negatively associated with feminism.

When people say, 'Are you one of those bra-burning feminists?' — and yes, I have been asked this many times — the people who ask this are doing so from a pre-existing place of hostility toward feminism.

=== Historical precedent ===
The bra-burning trope echoed an earlier generation of feminists who called for burning corsets as a step toward liberation. In 1873 Elizabeth Stuart Phelps Ward wrote:

Burn up the corsets! ... No, nor do you save the whalebones, you will never need whalebones again. Make a bonfire of the cruel steels that have lorded it over your thorax and abdomens for so many years and heave a sigh of relief, for your emancipation I assure you, from this moment has begun.

=== Backlash ===
Author and feminist Bonnie J. Dow suggested that the association between feminism and bra-burning was encouraged by individuals who opposed the feminist movement. "Bra-burning" created an image that women were not really seeking freedom from sexism, but were attempting to assert themselves as sexual beings. This might lead individuals to believe, as she wrote in her article "Feminism, Miss America, and Media Mythology", that the women were merely trying to be "trendy, and to attract men".

Women associated with an act like symbolically burning their bra may be seen by some as law-breaking radicals, eager to shock the public. This view may have supported the efforts of opponents to feminism and their desire to invalidate the movement. Some feminist activists believe that anti-feminists use the bra-burning myth and the subject of going braless to trivialize what the protesters were trying to accomplish that day and the feminist movement in general. Joseph Campbell described the reaction that ensued as "serving to denigrate and trivialize the objectives of the women's liberation movement."

=== No More Miss America protest ! ===
The protest planners produced a press release before the event that was afterward turned into a pamphlet titled No More Miss America!. The pamphlet called on women to help "reclaim ourselves for ourselves". Written by Robin Morgan, it listed ten characteristics of the Miss America pageant that Morgan believed degraded women.

Morgan wrote that the pageant contestants epitomize the "Degrading Mindless-Boob-Girlie Symbol". The runway parade is a metaphor of the 4-H Club county fair, where the animals are judged for teeth, hair, grooming, and so forth, and where the best specimen is awarded the blue ribbon. Since its inception in 1921, only Caucasian contestants had been accepted as finalists, so the authors derided the contest as "Racism with Roses". They criticized the "cheerleader" tour taken by the winner to visit troops in foreign countries as "Miss America as Military Death Mascot". Her support of troops personifies the "unstained patriotic American womanhood our boys are fighting for".

She wrote that Miss America is a walking commercial for the pageant's sponsors, making her a primary part of "The Consumer Con-Game". It deplored the win-or-you're-worthless competitive disease, which it described as "Competition Rigged and Unrigged". The authors criticized "The Woman as Pop Culture Obsolescent Theme", which they described as the promotion of women who are young, juicy, and malleable, but upon the selection of a new winner each year, are discarded.

She compared the pageant to Playboy's centerfold as sisters under the skin, describing this as "The Unbeatable Madonna–Whore Combination". The writers accused the competition of encouraging women to be inoffensive, bland, and apolitical, ignoring characteristics like personality, articulateness, intelligence, and commitment. They called this "The Irrelevant Crown on the Throne of Mediocrity". The pamphlet said the pageant was "Miss America as Dream Equivalent To", positioning itself as the penultimate goal of every little girl, while boys were supposed to grow up and become President of the United States. Men are judged by their actions, women by appearance.

Morgan wrote that the pageant attempted thought control, creating the illusion of "Miss America as Big Sister Watching You". It attempted to enslave women in high-heeled, low-status roles, and to inculcate values in young girls like women as beasts of shopping. "No More Miss America!" was the very first public pamphlet of the time to share the movement's ideals; therefore, complaints about the Pageant, recorded in the pamphlet, outlined and predicted numerous problems these women might have to overcome in their battle for equality. The pamphlet became a source for feminist scholarship.

== Legacy ==
A six-minute documentary, Up Against the Wall Miss America (1968), concerns the Miss America protest.

The demonstration was largely responsible for bringing the women's liberation movement into the American national consciousness. The event "'marked the end of the movement's obscurity' and made both 'women's liberation' and beauty standards topics for national discussion".

Feminist symbol designed by Robin Morgan for the protest, where it was popularized

Robin Morgan designed the feminist symbol of a raised fist within the Venus symbol for the protest, where it was popularized.

"No more Miss America! Ten points of protest" was included in the 1970 anthology Sisterhood is Powerful, edited by Robin Morgan.

== Civil rights protest ==
Also on September 7, 1968, in Atlantic City, a separate civil rights demonstration took place in the form of a beauty pageant. African Americans and civil rights activists gather to crown the first Miss Black America. The winner, nineteen-year-old Philadelphia native Saundra Williams, had been active on the civil rights scene prior to the competition. As a student at Maryland State College, she helped organize the Black Awareness Movement with her classmates and staged a sit-in at a local restaurant, which refused to serve African Americans.

Born to a middle-class family, she aspired to a career in social work and child welfare. She explained her motivation for running in the pageant:

Miss America does not represent us because there has never been a black girl in the pageant. With my title, I can show black women that they too are beautiful. ... There is a need to keep saying this over and over because for so long none of us believed it. But now we're finally coming around.

The competition, organized by civil rights activist J. Morris Anderson, was held at the Ritz Carlton a few blocks from Convention Hall, where the Miss America pageant took place the same evening. The Miss Black America contestants, prior to competition, rode in a convertible motorcade through the streets of Atlantic City and were greeted with cheers and applause, especially from members of the black community.

The Miss Black America protest and the NYRW protest were driven by fundamentally different motivation. NYRW protested the very idea of beauty standards and the pageant that upheld them. The Miss Black America protesters had no grievances with the idea of beauty standards, but with the fact that they strongly favored white women. While NYRW wanted to dismantle the whole idea of beauty, Miss Black America protesters wanted to expand notions of beauty to include all races.

Feminist protester and organizer Robin Morgan said "We deplore Miss Black America as much as Miss White America but we understand the black issue involved."

== See also ==
- Feminist sex wars
