= Irene Peslikis =

American feminist artist and activist

Irene Peslikis (October 7, 1943 – November 28, 2002) was an American feminist artist, activist, and educator. She was one of the early founders and organizers in the women's art movement, especially on the east coast.

== Life and career ==
Irene Peslikis spent her life in New York City. She was born into a Greek working-class family in Queens. She began her studies in art at the Pratt Institute after completing high school in 1962, before breaking away in 1963 to help found The New York Studio School of Drawing, Painting and Sculpture. She graduated from Queens College in New York in 1973 and earned an MFA from the City College of New York in 1983.

Peslikis organized the first show of Second Wave women artists. She was a founder of the New York Feminist Art Institute, which ran a full-time radical feminist art education program for women for years. With another feminist artist, Patricia Mainardi, Marjorie Kramer and Lucia Vernarelli, Peslikis founded the journal Women & Art, which helped to make the artist Alice Neel famous.

She was a founder of the NoHo Gallery in Manhattan, one of the first cooperative feminist art galleries. Her political cartoons, widely circulated in the early Women's Liberation Movement years & published in feminist journals and in collections of the feminist movement like Dear Sisters: Dispatches from the Women’s Liberation Movement. Peslikis was one of the earliest members of Redstockings, the leading Feminist women’s theoretical and consciousness- raising group in New York City as well as a member of the earlier group New York Radical Women and was a key organizer and participant of the Redstocking abortion speak-out at Washington Square Methodist Church in 1969. She was also active in the Greek community.

== Teaching ==
Peslikis taught courses on painting, drawing, visual arts orientation, women and art studio workshop, and contemporary perspectives on art at a number of post-secondary institutions including the City College of New York, the College of Staten Island, the College of New Rochelle and Ramapo College.

== Writing on feminism and art ==
Peslikis wrote "Resistances to Consciousness" (printed in Notes from the Second Year), an important paper for understanding consciousness raising and women's resistance to it. She also contributed to the Archives of American Art "Art World in Turmoil" oral history project with Patricia Mainardi. She published pieces on art and art history and criticism in Rozinanta, Demokratia and Eleftheri-Patrida.
