= Cisler =

Cisler is a surname. Notable people with the surname include:

- Lucinda Cisler (born 1938), American abortion rights activist
- Walker Lee Cisler (1897–1994), American engineer and business executive
