= Celestine Ware =

American women's rights activist

- Died: August 21, 2010 New York City
- Occupation: Author
- Subject: Black feminism
- Notable works: Woman Power: The Movement for Women's Liberation

Celestine Ware (née Cellestine Ware, died August 21, 2010) was a radical and Black feminist theorist and activist. A member of the New York Radical Feminists, she authored Woman Power: The Movement for Women's Liberation.

== Early life ==
Ware was born in Cleveland, Ohio and graduated from Radcliffe College in 1962..

== Feminist groups ==
=== New York Radical Feminists ===
In the late 1960s, Celestine Ware joined the New York Radical Feminists. Ware was one of the few Black women in the radical feminist group.

The NYRF created a manifesto, titled Politics of the Ego: A Manifesto for N.Y. Radical Feminists, in 1970. Acceptance of this manifesto was required to gain membership. The manifesto defined radical feminism as a political ideology that recognizes how society maintains men's power over women. Its primary thesis was that, in all societies, men's egos were the key reason for male supremacy over women. In essence, it declared, the main purpose of male chauvinism was to promote psychological ego. The text declared that women are living in a male power structure that reinforces men's egos: "We are rewarded according to how well we perform these services. Our skill – our profession – is our ability to be feminine – that is, dainty, sweet, passive, helpless, ever-giving and sexy." In childhood, while girls' future identities were predetermined as submissive homemakers and mothers, their egos were repressed, while boys could explore a plethora of activities and "fight, get dirty, be aggressive and be self-assertive." The text stated that in schools, subjects that teach mastery and control over the natural world, such as science and math, were oriented towards male students. School counselors, it stated, recommended nursing for girls, whereas boys were encouraged to obtain the primary and dominant position of a doctor. As a result, the manifesto emphasized, women are discouraged from any decision-making power; women were barred from decision-making positions in politics and relegated to auxiliary roles. Societal constructs, the manifesto stated, confined women.

== Woman Power: The Movement for Women's Liberation ==
Ware's book Woman Power: The Movement for Women's Liberation (1970) was one of the first books that documented the emerging women's liberation movement and second-wave feminist movement in the United States. Her book played a pivotal role in explaining and promoting radical feminism and Black feminism.

One of the primary objectives of Ware's book was to provide a tangible account of the protests that had emerged from 1967 to 1969. She explained that women were leading a revolution in America's major cities, small towns, and college campuses. She categorized these women as "new feminists," demanding complete social, political, and economic equality.

Ware divided the contemporary women's liberation movement into three categories: NOW, or reform feminism; the WLM, or the women's liberation movement, representing feminist thoughts that all evade revolution; and radical feminism. Ware defined the term, "radical" as "revolutionary," conveying that radical feminism is a complete revolution. Ware described how the institution of marriage is revolted against under radical feminism, as this ideology advocates for the elimination of marriage.

Ware also utilized her book to promote the positions of the New York Radical Feminists. While she explained that the Black Power, Marxist, and New Left movements were critical precursors for the women's liberation movement, she did not believe that those movements thoroughly addressed women's subordination in society. The book positioned women's liberation as potentially the most revolutionary movement of all. It defined "radical feminism" as "working for the eradication of domination and elitism in all human relationships. This would make self-determination the ultimate good and require the downfall of society as we know it today."

Ware argued that women are relegated to second-class citizenship and unjust subordination. She criticized traditional gendered roles that limited women to domestic nurturers and caregivers. Ware described how the new feminists advocated for equality in a society where any job or position is open to any qualified individual, regardless of one's sex, whether a woman seeks to obtain the job of a "pie maker" or the role of "the Presidency. She argued that sex roles were stereotyped male and female identities, and that these roles or hierarchical systems must be eradicated in order to eliminate dominance in human relationships.

Ware's book also criticized the Whiteness of radical feminism. She argued that the women's liberation movement, exemplified by the New York Radical Feminists and the Redstockings, is "a multitude of White women with an only occasional Black sister to lend color to the meetings." In order to encourage unity amongst Black and White women in the liberation movement, Ware promoted the concept of "consciousness-raising." The notion of consciousness refers to becoming aware of social injustice and inequalities and how it impact all women, regardless of race. She advocated that consciousness-raising enables feminists to build group intimacy, create internal democracy, direct concern toward institutionalized oppression, and provide women with the skills to comprehend and initiate political action. Ware pointed out that White feminists failed to concern themselves with issues that mainly affected Black women, such as the barriers they had to white-collar jobs. As a result, many Black women worked as domestics, and she argued that feminists must restructure domestic labor as a professional position that provides a full living wage, old age benefits, medical insurance, and social security. Ware sought to address the needs of women-headed households and single mothers, whom Ware argued deserved to have welfare rights, including full-time community-based child care. She also urged the movement to address issues related to housewives and women who were not part of urban intellectual circles.

== Black Feminism ==
Ware's book Woman Power: The Movement for Women's Liberation was also one of the earliest written accounts to detail the Black radical women's movement. A revised chapter from the book "Black Feminism" was republished in the landmark feminist anthology Notes From the Third Year.

While Ware's book Woman Power upheld the nineteenth-century feminists like Elizabeth Cady Stanton and Susan B. Anthony as precursors for the radical feminism of the 1970s, she pointed out that racism and exclusion of Black women then and in the 1960s and 1970s were key problems in the movement and that the concerns of White women had been historically prioritized over those of women of color. Ware took a "constructive approach" that urged Black women to take initiative in proactive engagement and participation in the movement, and to center their voices and demands. She believed that creating a better world required both practical efforts and a collective fostering of various moral and emotional disciplines.

Ware made significant contributions in pioneering Black feminism emerging as both a distinct and essential voice within the broader feminist movement. By pointing out the economic disparities that existed between Black women and White women and that women of color had different forms of oppression that needed to be addressed, she advocated a feminism rooted in the intersectionality of race, gender, and class. Ware strongly advocated for a female social science, female political systems, and female language and culture, which she believed is the biggest contribution to achieving self-discovery.

In May 1971 she interviewed American folk musician Odetta on Pacifica Radio.
