= Radical feminism =

Perspective within feminism

Radical feminism is a perspective within feminism that calls for a radical re-ordering of society in which male supremacy is eliminated in all social and economic contexts, while recognizing that women's experiences are also affected by other social divisions such as race, class, and sexual orientation. The ideology and movement emerged in the 1960s.

Radical feminists view society fundamentally as a patriarchy in which men dominate and oppress women. Radical feminists seek to abolish the patriarchy in a struggle to liberate women and girls from an unjust society by challenging existing social norms and institutions. This struggle includes opposing the sexual objectification of women, raising public awareness about such issues as rape and other violence against women, challenging the concept of gender roles, and challenging what radical feminists see as a racialized and gendered capitalism that characterizes the United States, the United Kingdom, and many other countries. According to Shulamith Firestone in The Dialectic of Sex (1970): "[T]he end goal of feminist revolution must be, unlike that of the first feminist movement, not just the elimination of male privilege but of the sex distinction itself: genital differences between human beings would no longer matter culturally." While radical feminists believe that differences in genitalia and secondary sex characteristics should not matter culturally or politically, they also maintain that women's special role in reproduction should be recognized and accommodated without penalty in the workplace, and some have argued compensation should be offered for this socially essential work.

Radical feminists locate the root cause of women's oppression in patriarchal gender relations, as opposed to legal systems (as in liberal feminism) or class conflict (as in Marxist feminism). Early radical feminism, arising within second-wave feminism in the 1960s, typically viewed patriarchy as a "transhistorical phenomenon" prior to or deeper than other sources of oppression, "not only the oldest and most universal form of domination but the primary form" and the model for all others. Later politics derived from radical feminism ranged from cultural feminism to syncretic forms of socialist feminism (such as anarcha-feminism) that place issues of social class, economics, and the like on a par with patriarchy as sources of oppression.

== Theory and ideology ==
Radical feminists assert that global society functions as a patriarchy in which the class of men are the oppressors of the class of women. They propose that the oppression of women is the most fundamental form of oppression, one that has existed since the inception of humanity. As radical feminist Ti-Grace Atkinson wrote in her foundational piece "Radical Feminism" (1969):

The first dichotomous division of this mass [mankind] is said to have been on the grounds of sex: male and female ... it was because half the human race bears the burden of the reproductive process and because man, the 'rational' animal, had the wit to take advantage of that, that the childbearers, or the 'beasts of burden,' were corralled into a political class: equivocating the biologically contingent burden into a political (or necessary) penalty, thereby modifying these individuals' definition from the human to the functional, or animal.

Radical feminists argue that, because of patriarchy, women have come to be viewed as the "other" to the male norm, and as such have been systematically oppressed and marginalized. They further assert that men, as a class, benefit from the systematic oppression of women. Patriarchal theory is not defined by a belief that all men always benefit from the oppression of all women. Rather, it maintains that the primary element of patriarchy is a relationship of dominance, where one party is dominant and exploits the other for the benefit of the former. Radical feminists believe that men (as a class) use social systems and other methods of control to keep women (as well as non-dominant men) suppressed. Radical feminists seek to abolish patriarchy by challenging existing social norms and institutions, and believe that eliminating patriarchy will liberate everyone from an unjust society. Ti-Grace Atkinson maintained that the need for power fuels the male class to continue oppressing the female class, arguing that "the need men have for the role of oppressor is the source and foundation of all human oppression".

The influence of radical-feminist politics on the women's liberation movement was considerable. Redstockings co-founder Ellen Willis wrote in 1984 that radical feminists "got sexual politics recognized as a public issue", created second-wave feminism's vocabulary, helped to legalize abortion in the US, "were the first to demand total equality in the so-called private sphere" ("housework and child care ... emotional and sexual needs"), and "created the atmosphere of urgency" that almost led to the passage of the Equal Rights Amendment. The influence of radical feminism can be seen in the adoption of these issues by the National Organization for Women (NOW), a feminist group that had previously been focused almost entirely on economic issues.

== Movement ==
=== Roots ===
Radical feminists in the United States coined the term women's liberation movement (WLM). The WLM grew largely due to the influence of the civil rights movement, that had gained momentum in the 1960s, and many of the women who took up the cause of radical feminism had previous experience with radical protest in the struggle against racism. Chronologically, it can be seen within the context of second wave feminism that started in the early 1960s. The leading figures of this second wave of feminism included Shulamith Firestone, Kathie Sarachild, Ti-Grace Atkinson, Carol Hanisch, Roxanne Dunbar, Naomi Weisstein and Judith Brown. In the late sixties various women's groups describing themselves as "radical feminist", such as the UCLA Women's Liberation Front (WLF), offered differing views of radical feminist ideology. UCLA's WLF co-founder Devra Weber recalls, "the radical feminists were opposed to patriarchy, but not necessarily capitalism. In our group at least, they opposed so-called male dominated national liberation struggles".

Radical feminists helped to translate the radical protest for racial equality, in which many had experience, over to the struggle for women's rights. They took up the cause and advocated for a variety of women's issues, including abortion rights, the Equal Rights Amendment, access to credit, and equal pay. Many women of color were among the founders of the Women's Liberation Movement (Fran Beal, Cellestine Ware, Toni Cade Bambara); however, many women of color did not participate in the movement due to their conclusion that radical feminists were not addressing "issues of meaning for minority women", Black women in particular. After consciousness raising groups were formed to rally support, second-wave radical feminism began to see an increasing number of women of color participating.

In the 1960s, radical feminism emerged within liberal feminist and working-class feminist discussions, first in the United States, then in the United Kingdom and Australia. Those involved had gradually come to believe that it was not only the middle-class nuclear family that oppressed women, but that it was also social movements and organizations that claimed to stand for human liberation, notably the counterculture, the New Left, and Marxist political parties, all of which were male-dominated and male-oriented. In the United States, radical feminism developed as a response to some of the perceived failings of both New Left organizations such as the Students for a Democratic Society (SDS) and feminist organizations such as NOW. Initially concentrated in big cities like New York, Chicago, Boston, Washington, DC, and on the West Coast, (Note: While Willis (1984) does not mention Chicago, as early as 1967 it was a major site for consciousness-raising and home of the Voice of Women's Liberation Movement; see Kate Bedford and Ara Wilson Lesbian Feminist Chronology: 1963–1970 (Archived 17 July 2007 at the Wayback Machine).) radical feminist groups spread across the country rapidly from 1968 to 1972. Boston Female Liberation was formed at this time.

At the same time parallel trends of thinking developed outside the USA: The Women's Yearbook from Munich gives a good sense of early 1970s feminism in West Germany:

Their Yearbook essay on behalf of the autonomous feminist movement argued that patriarchy was the oldest and most fundamental relationship of exploitation. Hence the necessity of feminists' separating from men's organizations on the Left, since they would just use women's efforts to support their own goals, in which women's liberation did not count. The editors of Frauenjahrbuch 76 also explicitly distanced themselves from the language of liberalism, arguing that "equal rights define women's oppression as women's disadvantage." They explicitly labeled the equal rights version of feminism as wanting to be like men, vehemently rejecting claims that "women should enter all the male-dominated areas of society. More women in politics! More women in the sciences, etc. . . . Women should be able to do everything that men do." Their position—and that of the autonomous feminists represented in this 1976 yearbook—instead was that: "This principle that 'we want that too' or 'we can do it too' measures emancipation against men and again defines what we want in relationship to men. Its content is conformity to men. . . . Because in this society male characteristics fundamentally have more prestige, recognition and above all more power, we easily fall into the trap of rejecting and devaluing all that is female and admiring and emulating all that is considered male. . . . The battle against the female role must not become the battle for the male role. . . . The feminist demand, which transcends the claim for equal rights, is the claim for self-determination.

Radical feminists introduced the use of consciousness raising (CR) groups. These groups brought together intellectuals, workers, and middle-class women in developed Western countries to discuss their experiences. During these discussions, women noted a shared and repressive system regardless of their political affiliation or social class. Based on these discussions, the women drew the conclusion that ending of patriarchy was the most necessary step towards a truly free society. These consciousness-raising sessions allowed early radical feminists to develop a political ideology based on common experiences women faced with male supremacy. Consciousness raising was extensively used in chapter sub-units of the National Organization for Women (NOW) during the 1970s. The feminism that emerged from these discussions stood first and foremost for the liberation of women, as women, from the oppression of men in their own lives, as well as men in power. Radical feminism claimed that a totalizing ideology and social formation—patriarchy (government or rule by fathers)—dominated women in the interests of men.

=== Groups ===
Logo of the Redstockings

Within groups such as New York Radical Women (1967–1969; not connected to the present-day socialist feminist organization Radical Women), which Ellen Willis characterized as "the first women's liberation group in New York City", a radical feminist ideology began to emerge. It declared that "the personal is political" and the "sisterhood is powerful"; calls to women's activism coined by Kathie Sarachild and others in the group. New York Radical Women fell apart in early 1969 in what came to be known as the "politico-feminist split", with the "politicos" seeing capitalism as the main source of women's oppression, while the "feminists" saw women's oppression in a male supremacy that was "a set of material, institutionalized relations, not just bad attitudes". The feminist side of the split, whose members referred to themselves as "radical feminists", soon constituted the basis of a new organization, Redstockings. At the same time, Ti-Grace Atkinson led "a radical split-off from NOW", which became known as The Feminists. A third major stance would be articulated by the New York Radical Feminists, founded later in 1969 by Shulamith Firestone (who broke from the Redstockings) and Anne Koedt.

During this period, the movement produced "a prodigious output of leaflets, pamphlets, journals, magazine articles, newspaper and radio and TV interviews". Many important feminist works, such as Koedt's essay The Myth of the Vaginal Orgasm (1970) and Kate Millett's book Sexual Politics (1970), emerged during this time and in this milieu.

=== Ideology emerges and diverges ===
At the beginning of this period, "heterosexuality was more or less an unchallenged assumption". Among radical feminists, it was widely held that, thus far, the sexual freedoms gained in the sexual revolution of the 1960s, in particular, the decreasing emphasis on monogamy, had been largely gained by men at women's expense. This assumption of heterosexuality would soon be challenged by the rise of political lesbianism, closely associated with Atkinson and The Feminists.

Redstockings and The Feminists were both radical feminist organizations, but held rather distinct views. Most members of Redstockings held to a materialist and anti-psychologistic view. They viewed men's oppression of women as ongoing and deliberate, holding individual men responsible for this oppression, viewing institutions and systems (including the family) as mere vehicles of conscious male intent, and rejecting psychologistic explanations of female submissiveness as blaming women for collaboration in their own oppression. They held to a view—which Willis would later describe as "neo-Maoist"—that it would be possible to unite all or virtually all women, as a class, to confront this oppression by personally confronting men.

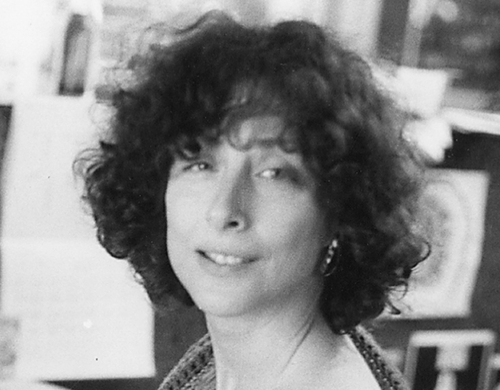
Ellen Willis

The Feminists held a more idealistic, psychologistic, and utopian philosophy, with a greater emphasis on "sex roles", seeing sexism as rooted in "complementary patterns of male and female behavior". They placed more emphasis on institutions, seeing marriage, family, prostitution, and heterosexuality as all existing to perpetuate the "sex-role system". They saw all of these as institutions to be destroyed. Within the group, there were further disagreements, such as Koedt's viewing the institution of "normal" sexual intercourse as being focused mainly on male sexual or erotic pleasure, while Atkinson viewed it mainly in terms of reproduction. In contrast to the Redstockings, The Feminists generally considered genitally focused sexuality to be inherently male. Ellen Willis, the Redstockings co-founder, would later write that insofar as the Redstockings considered abandoning heterosexual activity, they saw it as a "bitter price" they "might have to pay for [their] militance", whereas The Feminists embraced separatist feminism as a strategy.

The New York Radical Feminists (NYRF) took a more psychologistic (and even biologically determinist) line. They argued that men dominated women not so much for material benefits as for the ego satisfaction intrinsic in domination. Similarly, they rejected the Redstockings view that women submitted only out of necessity or The Feminists' implicit view that they submitted out of cowardice, but instead argued that social conditioning simply led most women to accept a submissive role as "right and natural".

Rosemarie Tong proposes the terms radical-libertarian feminism and radical-cultural feminism to address the fundamental split within radical feminism over how to dismantle patriarchal oppression. Radical-libertarian feminists, such as Kate Millett and Shulamith Firestone, advocate for the abolition of rigid gender roles and the embrace of androgyny, arguing that women should be free to adopt both masculine and feminine traits to achieve full human potential. They emphasize sexual liberation, including diverse sexual practices, and support artificial reproduction as a means to free women from the biological burdens of childbirth. In contrast, radical-cultural feminists, like Mary Daly and Marilyn French, celebrate femaleness and the unique virtues traditionally associated with femininity, such as nurturing and community. They critique androgyny as a rejection of women's inherent strengths and promote lesbianism as a more liberating alternative to heterosexuality. Radical-cultural feminists also see natural reproduction as a source of women's power and oppose artificial reproduction, which they believe could further entrench male dominance.

=== Forms of action ===
The radical feminism of the late 1960s was not only a movement of ideology and theory; it helped to inspire direct action. In 1968, feminists protested against the Miss America pageant in order to bring "sexist beauty ideas and social expectations" to the forefront of women's social issues. Even though bras were not burned on that day, the protest led to the phrase "bra-burner". "Feminists threw their bras—along with "woman-garbage" such as girdles, false eyelashes, steno pads, wigs, women's magazines, and dishcloths—into a "Freedom Trash Can", but they did not set it on fire". In March 1970, more than one hundred feminists staged an 11-hour sit-in at the Ladies' Home Journal headquarters. These women demanded that the publication replace its male editor with a female editor, and accused the Ladies Home Journal, "with their emphasis on food, family, fashion, and femininity", of being "instruments of women's oppression". One protester explained the goal of the protest by saying that they "were there to destroy a publication which feeds off of women's anger and frustration, a magazine which destroys women."

Another key radical protest of the second wave was the Fifth Street Women's Building Takeover in January 1971, when over a hundred women illegally occupied an abandoned New York City building for thirteen days. They established a food co-operative, day care, and lesbian center before being forcibly removed and arrested by police.

Radical feminists used a variety of tactics, including demonstrations, speakouts, and community and work-related organizing, to gain exposure and adherents. In France and West Germany, radical feminists developed further forms of direct action.

==== Self-incrimination ====
On 6 June 1971 the cover of Stern showed 28 German actresses and journalists confessing "We Had an Abortion!" (wir haben abgetrieben!) unleashing a campaign against the abortion ban. The journalist Alice Schwarzer had organized this avowal form of protest following a French example.

In 1974, Schwarzer persuaded 329 doctors to publicly admit in Der Spiegel to having performed abortions. She also found a woman willing to terminate her pregnancy on camera with vacuum aspiration, thereby promoting this method of abortion by showing it on the German political television program Panorama. Cristina Perincioli described this as "... a new tactic: the ostentatious, publicly documented violation of a law that millions of women had broken thus far, only in secret and under undignified circumstances." However, with strong opposition from church groups and most of the broadcasting councils governing West Germany's ARD (association of public broadcasters), the film was not aired. Instead Panorama's producers replaced the time slot with a statement of protest and the display of an empty studio.

==== Circumventing the abortion ban ====
In the 1970s, radical women's centers without a formal hierarchy sprang up in West Berlin. These Berlin-based women's centers did abortion counseling, compiled a list of Dutch abortion clinics, organized regular bus trips to them, and were utilized by women from other parts of West Germany. Police accused the organizers of an illegal conspiracy. "The center used these arrests to publicize its strategy of civil disobedience and raised such a public outcry that the prosecutions were dropped. The bus trips continued without police interference. This victory was politically significant in two respects... while the state did not change the law, it did back off from enforcing it, deferring to women's collective power. The feminist claim to speak for women was thus affirmed by both women and the state."

==== Leaving the Church ====
In West Germany, 1973 saw the start of a radical feminist group campaign to withdraw from membership in the Catholic Church as a protest against its anti-abortion position and activities. "Can we continue to be responsible for funding a male institution that ... condemns us as ever to the house, to cooking and having children, but above all to having children". In Germany those baptized in one of the officially recognized churches have to document that they have formally left the church in order not to be responsible for paying a church tax.

==== Protest of biased coverage of lesbians ====
In November 1972, two women in a sexual relationship, Marion Ihns and Judy Andersen, were arrested and charged with hiring a man to kill Ihns's abusive husband. Pretrial publicity, particularly that by Bild, Germany's largest tabloid, was marked by anti-lesbian sensationalism. In response, lesbian groups and women's centers in Germany joined in fervent protest. The cultural clash continued through the trial which eventually resulted in the conviction of the women in October 1974 and life sentences for both. However, a petition brought by 146 female journalists and 41 male colleagues to the German Press Council resulted in its censure of the Axel Springer Company, Bild's publisher. At one point in the lead up to the trial Bild had run a seventeen consecutive day series on "The Crimes of Lesbian Women".

==== Genital self-exams ====
The women's health movement in the United States encouraged women to educate themselves about their own bodies and perform self-health examinations. Beginning in the 1970s, feminist health centers were established to provide information and resources about women's health. Clinics founded during this period included the Feminist Women's Health Center in Atlanta and the Leichhardt Women’s Health Centre in Australia. The widely influential book Our Bodies, Ourselves began as a mimeographed booklet created by the Boston Women's Health Collective.

==== Women in print ====
Many women faced censorship when attempting to have their writings published or printed privately. In 1971, the Ain't I a Woman? collective in Iowa City could not find a commercial printer willing to print informational material about women's health, including instructional images demonstrating cervical self-examinations. This led to the creation of the Iowa City Women's Press in 1972. Many traditional publishers and commercial printers also refused to print lesbian material. After June Arnold could not find a publisher for her novel The Cook and the Carpenter, she founded Daughters, Inc. and published it herself.

The women in print movement aimed to establish autonomous communications networks of feminist periodicals, presses, and bookstores created by and for women. Over 560 periodicals were established between 1968 and 1973. Radical feminists used these publications for consciousness raising, education, self-expression, and movement coordination. Feminist separatists and lesbian feminists also aimed to create woman-focused cultures and economies, often by operating their publishing enterprises as collectives.

=== Social organization and aims ===
Radical feminists have generally formed small activist or community associations around either consciousness raising or concrete aims. Many radical feminists in Australia participated in a series of squats to establish various women's centers, and this form of action was common in the late 1970s and early 1980s. By the mid-1980s many of the original consciousness raising groups had dissolved, and radical feminism was more and more associated with loosely organized university collectives. Radical feminism can still be seen, particularly within student activism and among working-class women. In Australia, many feminist social organizations had accepted government funding during the 1980s, and the election of a conservative government in 1996 crippled these organizations. A radical feminist movement also emerged among Jewish women in Israel beginning in the early 1970s.

While radical feminists aim to dismantle patriarchal society, their immediate aims are generally concrete. Common demands include expanding reproductive rights. According to writer Lisa Tuttle in The Encyclopedia of Feminism it was "defined by feminists in the 1970s as a basic human right, it includes the right to abortion and birth control, but implies much more. To be realised, reproductive freedom must include not only a woman's right to choose childbirth, abortion, sterilisation or birth control, but also her right to make those choices freely, without pressure from individual men, doctors, or governmental or religious authorities. It is a key issue for women, since without it the other freedoms we appear to have, such as the right to education, jobs and equal pay, may prove illusory. Provisions of childcare, medical treatment, and society's attitude towards children are also involved."

== Views on the sex industry ==
Radical feminists have written about a wide range of issues regarding the sex industry—which they tend to oppose—including but not limited to what many see as: the harm done to women during the production of pornography, the social harm from consumption of pornography, the coercion and poverty that leads women to become prostitutes, the long-term detrimental effects of prostitution, the raced and classed nature of prostitution, and male dominance over women in prostitution and pornography.

Feminists who oppose the acceptance and endorsement of prostitution by rebranding it as "sex work" argue that the term "sex work" contains political assumptions, rather than being a neutral term. They argue the term endorses the idea that sex is labour for women and leisure for men, according men the social and economic power to act as a ruling class in the matter of intercourse, and also implies that women's bodies exist as a resource to be used by other people. Feminists holding these beliefs are often referred to by critics as "sex worker-exclusionary radical feminists" or "SWERFs".

=== Prostitution ===
Radical feminists argue that most women who become prostitutes are forced into it by a pimp, human trafficking, poverty, drug addiction, or trauma such as child sexual abuse. Women from the lowest socioeconomic classes—impoverished women, women with a low level of education, women from the most disadvantaged racial and ethnic minorities—are over-represented in prostitution all over the world. Catharine MacKinnon asked: "If prostitution is a free choice, why are the women with the fewest choices the ones most often found doing it?" Radical feminist Melissa Farley conducted a 2004 study of 854 people involved in prostitution internationally, finding that 89% of respondents stated they wanted to escape prostitution but could not, 72% were currently or formerly homeless, and 68% met criteria for post-traumatic stress disorder.

MacKinnon argues that "In prostitution, women have sex with men they would never otherwise have sex with. The money thus acts as a form of force, not as a measure of consent. It acts like physical force does in rape." They believe that no person can be said to truly consent to their own oppression and no-one should have the right to consent to the oppression of others. Kathleen Barry argues that consent is not a "good divining rod as to the existence of oppression, and consent to violation is a fact of oppression". Andrea Dworkin wrote in 1992:

Prostitution in and of itself is an abuse of a woman's body. Those of us who say this are accused of being simple-minded. But prostitution is very simple. [...] In prostitution, no woman stays whole. It is impossible to use a human body in the way women's bodies are used in prostitution and to have a whole human being at the end of it, or in the middle of it, or close to the beginning of it. It's impossible. And no woman gets whole again later, after.

Dworkin argued that "prostitution and equality for women cannot exist simultaneously" and to eradicate prostitution "we must seek ways to use words and law to end the abusive selling and buying of girls' and women's bodies for men's sexual pleasure".

Radical feminist thinking has analyzed prostitution as a cornerstone of patriarchal domination and sexual subjugation of women that impacts negatively not only on the women and girls in prostitution but on all women as a group, because prostitution continually affirms and reinforces patriarchal definitions of women as having a primary function to serve men sexually. They say it is crucial that society does not replace one patriarchal view on female sexuality—that women should not have sex/a relationship outside marriage and that casual sex is shameful for a woman—with another similarly oppressive and patriarchal view—acceptance of prostitution, a sexual practice based on a highly patriarchal construct of sexuality: that the sexual pleasure of a woman is irrelevant, that her only role during sex is to submit to the man's sexual demands and to do what he tells her, that sex should be controlled by the man, and that the woman's response and satisfaction are irrelevant. Radical feminists argue that sexual liberation for women cannot be achieved so long as we normalize unequal sexual practices where a man dominates a woman. "Feminist consciousness raising remains the foundation for collective struggle and the eventual liberation of women".

Radical feminists strongly object to the patriarchal ideology that has been one of the justifications for the existence of prostitution, namely that prostitution is a "necessary evil", because men cannot control themselves, and that it is therefore "necessary" that a small number of women be "sacrificed" to be abused by men, to protect "chaste" women from rape and harassment. These feminists argue that far from decreasing rape rates, prostitution actually leads to an increase in sexual violence against women, by sending the message that it is acceptable for a man to treat a woman as a sexual instrument over which he has total control. For instance, Melissa Farley argues that Nevada's high rate of rapes is exacerbated by the patriarchal atmosphere encouraged by legal prostitution.

Indigenous women are particularly targeted for prostitution. In Canada, New Zealand, Mexico, and Taiwan, studies have shown that indigenous women are at the bottom of the race and class hierarchy of prostitution, often subjected to the worst conditions, most violent demands and sold at the lowest price. It is common for indigenous women to be over-represented in prostitution when compared with their total population. This is as a result of the combined forces of colonialism, physical displacement from ancestral lands, destruction of indigenous social and cultural order, misogyny, globalization/neoliberalism, race discrimination and extremely high levels of violence perpetrated against them.

=== Pornography ===
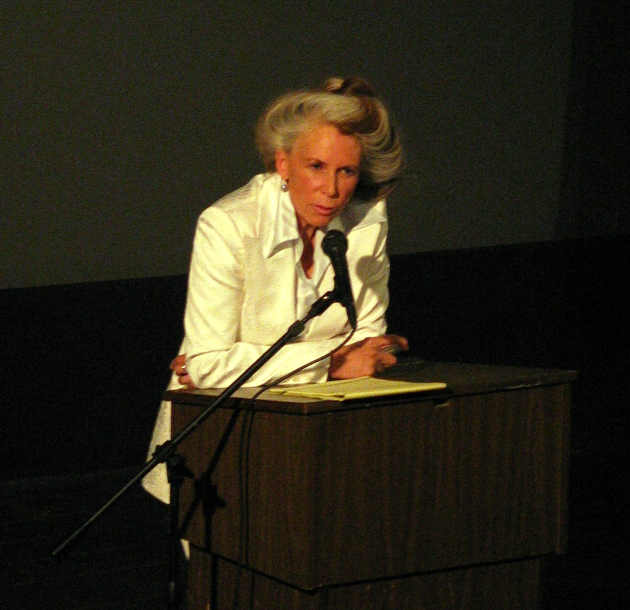
Catharine MacKinnon

Radical feminists, notably Catharine MacKinnon, charge that the production of pornography entails physical, psychological, and/or economic coercion of the women who perform and model in it. This is said to be true even when the women are presented as enjoying themselves. (Note: MacKinnon (1989): "Sex forced on real women so that it can be sold at a profit to be forced on other real women; women's bodies trussed and maimed and raped and made into things to be hurt and obtained and accessed, and this presented as the nature of women; the coercion that is visible and the coercion that has become invisible—this and more grounds the feminist concern with pornography.")

Radical feminists point to the testimony of well-known participants in pornography, such as Traci Lords and Linda Lovelace, and argue that most female performers are coerced into pornography, either by somebody else or by an unfortunate set of circumstances. The feminist anti-pornography movement was galvanized by the publication of Ordeal, in which Linda Boreman (who under the name of "Linda Lovelace" had starred in Deep Throat) stated that she had been beaten, raped, and pimped by her husband Chuck Traynor, and that Traynor had forced her at gunpoint to make scenes in Deep Throat, as well as forcing her, by use of both physical violence against Boreman as well as emotional abuse and outright threats of violence, to make other pornographic films. Dworkin, MacKinnon, and Women Against Pornography issued public statements of support for Boreman, and worked with her in public appearances and speeches. She later became a born-again Christian and a spokeswoman for the anti-pornography movement.

Radical feminists hold the view that pornography contributes to sexism, arguing that in pornographic performances the actresses are reduced to mere receptacles—objects—for sexual use and abuse by men. They argue that the narrative is usually formed around men's pleasure as the only goal of sexual activity, and that the women are shown in a subordinate role. Some opponents believe pornographic films tend to show women as being extremely passive, or that the acts which are performed on the women are typically abusive and solely for the pleasure of their sex partner. On-face ejaculation and anal sex are increasingly popular among men, following trends in porn. MacKinnon and Dworkin defined pornography as "the graphic sexually explicit subordination of women through pictures or words that also includes women dehumanized as sexual objects, things, or commodities...."

Radical feminists say that consumption of pornography is a cause of rape and other forms of violence against women. Robin Morgan summarizes this idea with her oft-quoted statement, "Pornography is the theory, and rape is the practice." They charge that pornography eroticizes the domination, humiliation, and coercion of women, and reinforces sexual and cultural attitudes that are complicit in rape and sexual harassment. In her book Only Words (1993), MacKinnon argues that pornography "deprives women of the right to express verbal refusal of an intercourse".

MacKinnon argued that pornography leads to an increase in sexual violence against women through fostering rape myths. Such rape myths include the belief that women really want to be raped and that they mean yes when they say no. She held that "rape myths perpetuate sexual violence indirectly by creating distorted beliefs and attitudes about sexual assault and shift elements of blame onto the victims". Additionally, according to MacKinnon, pornography desensitizes viewers to violence against women, and this leads to a progressive need to see more violence in order to become sexually aroused, an effect she claims is well documented.

German radical feminist Alice Schwarzer is one proponent of the view that pornography offers a distorted sense of men and women's bodies, as well as the actual sexual act, often showing performers with synthetic implants or exaggerated expressions of pleasure, engaging in fetishes that are presented as popular and normal.

== Radical lesbian feminism ==
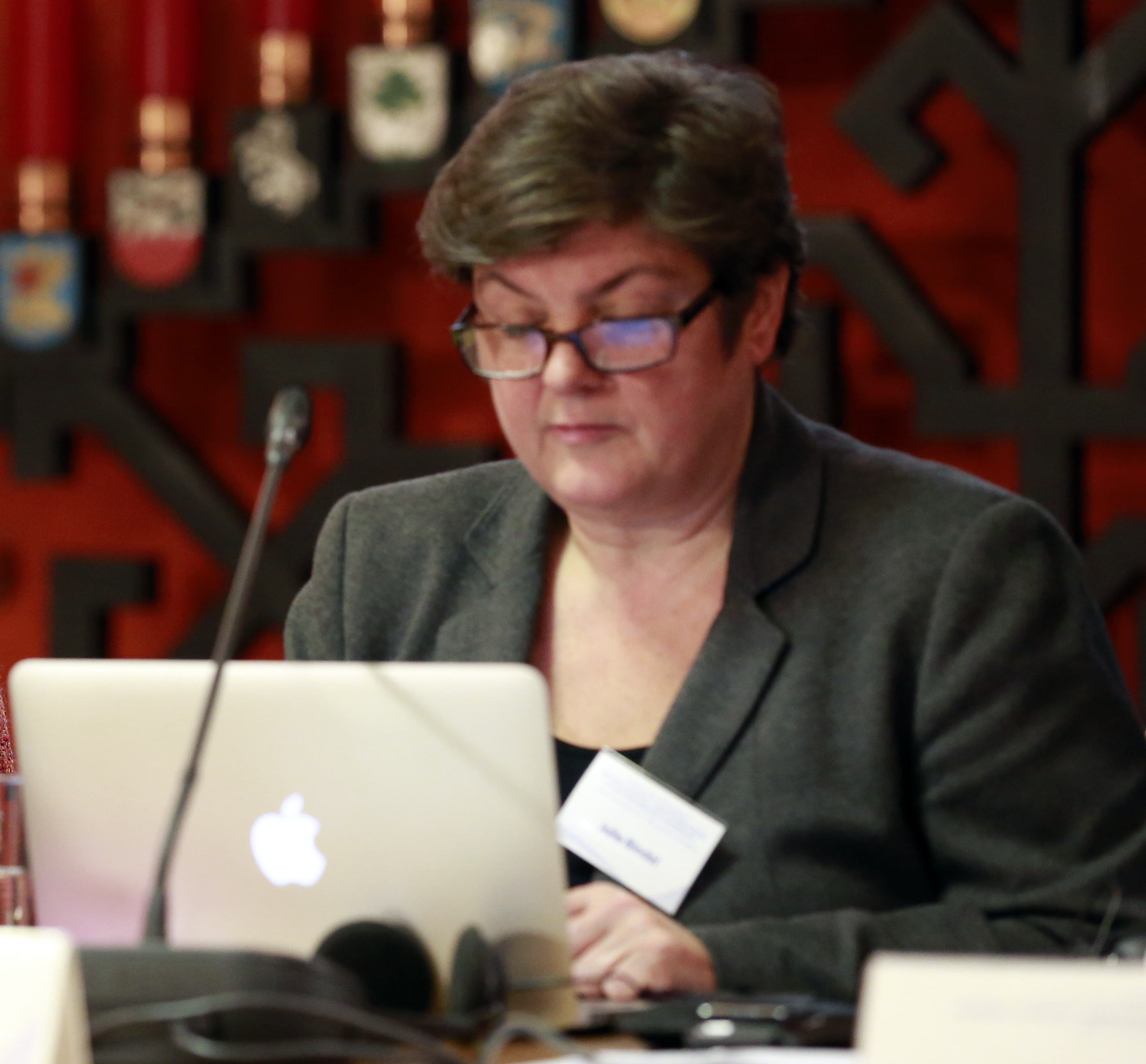
Julie Bindel

Radical lesbians are distinguished from other radical feminists through their ideological roots in political lesbianism. Radical lesbians see lesbianism as an act of resistance against the political institution of heterosexuality, which they view as violent and oppressive towards women. Julie Bindel has written that her lesbianism is "intrinsically bound up" with her feminism.

During the Women's Liberation Movement of the 1970s, straight women within the movement were challenged on the grounds that their heterosexual identities helped to perpetuate the very patriarchal systems that they were working to undo. According to radical lesbian writer Jill Johnston, a large fraction of the movement sought to reform sexist institutions while "leaving intact the staple nuclear unit of oppression: heterosexual sex". Others saw lesbianism as a strong political tool to help end male dominance and as central to the women's movement.

Radical lesbians criticized the women's liberation movement for its failure to criticize the "psychological oppression" of heteronormativity, which they believed to be "the sexual foundation of the social institutions". They argued that heterosexual love relationships perpetuated patriarchal power relations through "personal domination" and therefore directly contradicted the values and goals of the movement. As one radical lesbian wrote, "no matter what the feminist does, the physical act [of heterosexuality] throws both women and man back into role playing... all of her politics are instantly shattered". They argued that the women's liberation movement would not be successful without challenging heteronormativity.

Radical lesbians believed lesbianism actively threatened patriarchal systems of power. They defined lesbians not only by their sexual orientation, but by their liberation and independence from men. Lesbian activists Sidney Abbott and Barbara Love argued that "the lesbian has freed herself from male domination" through disconnecting from them not only sexually, but also "financially and emotionally". They argued that lesbianism fosters the utmost independence from gendered systems of power, and from the "psychological oppression" of heteronormativity.

Rejecting norms of gender, sex and sexuality was central to radical lesbian feminism. Radical lesbians believed that "lesbian identity was a 'woman-identified' identity'", meaning it should be defined by and with reference to women, rather than in relation to men.

In their manifesto "The Woman-Identified Woman", the lesbian radical feminist group Radicalesbians underlined their belief in the necessity of creating a "new consciousness" that rejected traditional normative definitions of womanhood and femininity which centered on powerlessness. Their redefinition of womanhood and femininity stressed the freeing of lesbian identity from harmful and divisive stereotypes. As Abbott and Love argued in "Is Women's Liberation a Lesbian Plot?" (1971):

As long as the word 'dyke' can be used to frighten women into a less militant stand, keep women separate from their sisters, and keep them from giving primacy to anything other than men and family—then to that extent they are dominated by male culture.

Radical lesbians reiterated this thought, writing, "in this sexist society, for a woman to be independent means she can't be a woman, she must be a dyke". The rhetoric of a "woman-identified-woman" has been criticized for its exclusion of heterosexual women. According to some critics, "[lesbian feminism's use of] woman-identifying rhetoric should be considered a rhetorical failure. Critics also argue that the intensity of radical lesbian feminist politics, on top of the preexisting stigma around lesbianism, gave a bad face to the feminist movement and provided fertile ground for tropes like the "man-hater" or "bra burner".

== Views on transgender topics ==
Since the 1970s, there has been a debate among radical feminists about transgender identities. Some radical feminists, such as Catharine MacKinnon, John Stoltenberg, Andrea Dworkin, Monique Wittig, and Finn Mackay have supported recognition of trans women as women, which they describe as trans-inclusive feminism, while others like Mary Daly, Janice Raymond, Robin Morgan, Germaine Greer, Sheila Jeffreys, Julie Bindel, and Robert Jensen, have argued that the transgender movement perpetuates patriarchal gender norms and is incompatible with radical feminist ideology.

Those who exclude trans women from womanhood or women's spaces commonly refer to themselves as gender critical and are referred to by others as trans-exclusionary. Radical feminists who hold gender-critical views are often referred to as "trans-exclusionary radical feminists" or "TERFs", an acronym to which they object, say is inaccurate (citing, for example, their inclusion of trans men as women), and argue is a slur or even hate speech.

Gender-critical or trans-exclusionary radical feminists in particular say that the difference in behavior between men and women is the result of socialization, and the idea that someone would have an inborn sense of femininity or masculinity runs contrary to the theory of gender socialization. Lierre Keith describes femininity as "a set of behaviors that are, in essence, ritualized submission", and hence, gender is not an identity but a caste position, and the philosophies of gender identity (specifically the feminine essence philosophy) are an obstacle to the abolition of gender and a reversion to a sex-based society. Julie Bindel argued in 2008 that Iran carries out the highest number of sex-change operations in the world, because "surgery is an attempt to keep gender stereotypes intact", and that "it is precisely this idea that certain distinct behaviours are appropriate for males and females that underlies feminist criticism of the phenomenon of 'transgenderism'." According to the BBC in 2014, there are no reliable figures regarding gender reassignment operations in Iran.

In 1978, the Lesbian Organization of Toronto voted to become womyn-born womyn only and wrote:

A woman's voice was almost never heard as a woman's voice—it was always filtered through men's voices. So here a guy comes along saying, "I'm going to be a girl now and speak for girls." And we thought, "No you're not." A person cannot just join the oppressed by fiat.

In The Transsexual Empire: The Making of the She-Male (1979), the lesbian radical feminist Janice Raymond argued that "All transsexuals rape women's bodies by reducing the real female form to an artifact, appropriating this body for themselves. However, the transsexually constructed lesbian-feminist violates women's sexuality and spirit, as well. Rape, although it is usually done by force, can also be accomplished by deception. It is significant that in the case of the transsexually constructed lesbian-feminist, often he is able to gain entrance and a dominant position in women's spaces because the women involved do not know he is a transsexual and he just does not happen to mention it." In The Whole Woman (1999), Germaine Greer wrote that largely male governments "recognise as women men who believe that they are women ... because [those governments] see women not as another sex but as a non-sex"; she continued that if uterus-and-ovaries transplants were a mandatory part of sex-change operations, the latter "would disappear overnight". A 2021 survey of trans women found that 90% believed a uterus transplant would improve their quality of life, and 88% believed the ability to menstruate would enhance their perception of their femininity.

Sheila Jeffreys argued in 1997 that "the vast majority of transsexuals still subscribe to the traditional stereotype of women" and that by transitioning they are "constructing a conservative fantasy of what women should be ... an essence of womanhood which is deeply insulting and restrictive." In Gender Hurts (2014), she referred to sex reassignment surgery as "self-mutilation", and used pronouns that refer to sex assigned at birth. Jeffreys argued that feminists need to know "the biological sex of those who claim to be women and promote prejudicial versions of what constitutes womanhood", and that the "use by men of feminine pronouns conceals the masculine privilege bestowed upon them by virtue of having been placed in and brought up in the male sex caste".

By contrast, trans-inclusive radical feminists claim that a biology-based or sex-essentialist ideology itself upholds patriarchal constructions of womanhood. Others assert that trans women also contributed to the feminist movement, and Susan Stryker stated that "transsexual women were active in the radical feminist movement of the late 1960s, but were almost entirely erased from its history after 1973" due to pushback from gender-critical feminists. Andrea Dworkin argued as early as 1974 that transgender people and gender identity research have the potential to radically undermine patriarchal sex essentialism:

...work with transsexuals, and studies of formation of gender identity in children provide basic information which challenges the notion that there are two discrete biological sexes. That information threatens to transform the traditional biology of sex difference into the radical biology of sex similarity. That is not to say that there is one sex, but that there are many. The evidence which is germane here is simple. The words "male" and "female", "man" and "woman", are used only because as yet there are no others.

In the late 2010s, interest in the issue of trans-inclusive feminism rose as trans acceptance gained headway. In 2015, radical feminist Catharine MacKinnon said:

Male dominant society has defined women as a discrete biological group forever. If this was going to produce liberation, we'd be free ... To me, women is a political group. I never had much occasion to say that, or work with it, until the last few years when there has been a lot of discussion about whether trans women are women ... I always thought I don't care how someone becomes a woman or a man; it does not matter to me. It is just part of their specificity, their uniqueness, like everyone else's. Anybody who identifies as a woman, wants to be a woman, is going around being a woman, as far as I'm concerned, is a woman.

== Reception ==
Gail Dines, an English radical feminist, spoke in 2011 about the appeal of radical feminism to young women: "After teaching women for 20-odd years, if I go in and I teach liberal feminism, I get looked [at] blank ... I go in and teach radical feminism, bang, the room explodes."

=== Criticism ===
Early in the radical feminism movement, some radical feminists theorized that "other kinds of hierarchy grew out of and were modeled on male supremacy and so, were in effect, specialized forms of male supremacy". Therefore, the fight against male domination took priority because "the liberation of women would mean the liberation of all". This view is contested, particularly by intersectional feminism and black feminism. Critics argue that this ideology accepts the notion that identities are singular and disparate, rather than multiple and intersecting. For example, understanding women's oppression as disparate assumes that "men, in creating and maintaining these systems, are acting purely as men, in accordance with peculiarly male characteristics or specifically male supremacist objectives".

Ellen Willis' 1984 essay "Radical Feminism and Feminist Radicalism" says that within the New Left, radical feminists were accused of being "bourgeois", "antileft", or even "apolitical", whereas they saw themselves as "radicalizing the left by expanding the definition of radical". Early radical feminists were mostly white and middle-class, resulting in "a very fragile kind of solidarity". This limited the validity of generalizations based on radical feminists' experiences of gender relations, and prevented white and middle-class women from recognizing that they benefited from race and class privilege according to Willis. Many early radical feminists broke ties with "male-dominated left groups", or would work with them only in ad hoc coalitions. Willis, although very much a part of early radical feminism and continuing to hold that it played a necessary role in placing feminism on the political agenda, criticized it as unable "to integrate a feminist perspective with an overall radical politics", while viewing this limitation as inevitable in the context of the time.
