= Lucinda Cisler =

- Born: 30 October 1938 (age 87)

Lucinda Cisler (born October 30, 1938) is an American abortion rights activist, Second Wave feminist, and member of the New York-based radical feminist group the Redstockings. Her writings on unnecessary obstructions to medical abortion procedures in many ways predicted anti-abortion strategies in the 2010s, called Targeted Regulation of Abortion Providers (TRAP) by abortion rights advocates.

== Education ==
Lucinda Cisler received the Betty Crocker Homemaker of Tomorrow Award for her high school in California in 1955. Cisler graduated from Vassar College in 1959. She received a Bachelor of Architecture degree from Yale University and a Masters of Architecture and Certificate in Civic Design from the University of Pennsylvania. Cisler attended the University of Pennsylvania on a Sears-Roebuck Foundation Fellowships. During her years at Yale, as part of her thesis, she designed a residence hall at Vassar College. She wrote “A place where a student lives can challenge and welcome her as much as her books and teachers can.”

== Activism ==
Lucinda Cisler has been a part of the feminist movement since 1968. Initially, she was highly concerned about women in the design field. She also became an abortion rights activist, advocating for women to have complete freedom to abortion and to deciding whether and when to terminate a pregnancy. As a member of the Redstockings, Cisler participated in the 1968 picketing of the Miss America pageant that introduced the women's liberation movement to mainstream media. She marched with a sign that read: "women are enslaved by beauty standards." She contributed a chapter, "Unfinished Business : Birth control and women's liberation", to Sisterhood is Powerful : An Anthology of Writings from the Women's Liberation Movement, edited by Robin Morgan. Lucinda Cisler helped produce and annotate the book, Rebirth of Feminism. The book is made up of ten sections of topics including early feminist writings, history and literary criticism.

== Abortion Rights Activism ==
Cisler devoted a majority of her time to writing and taking part in political activity for the annulment of all laws related to abortion and contraception. Cisler's essay on anti-abortion tactics appeared in the publication Notes from the Second Year: Women's Liberation, edited by Shulamith Firestone. "Abortion law repeal (sort of): a Warning to Women," argued that settling for reform to existing abortion law would result in a world "in which abortion is grudgingly parceled out by hospital committee fiat to the few women who can 'prove' they’ve been raped, or who are crazy, or are in danger of bearing a defective baby." Cisler claimed justice for women would come only when they are one hundred percent free from any restrictions regarding abortions. This comes from the idea that while change is happening in policies regarding abortion, supporting little changes rather than waiting for a drastic turn around is only making it harder to throw them out later. Cisler advocates for no restrictions on abortions. Typical legal restrictions include abortions only being allowed to be performed in licensed hospitals by a licensed physician, not being permitted after a certain stage of pregnancy (unless there is a risk to the women's life), and with a husband or parent's consent. “Steps in the right direction” are an insult and reform is only dividing women not bringing them together, Cisler wrote in an early essay. In 1972, she joined the Ms. magazine campaign, “We Have Had Abortions,” which called for an end to "archaic laws" limiting reproductive freedom, and encouraged women to share their stories and take action. Cisler wrote a discussion paper with James Clapp called “Abortion Ruling: Some Good News… and Some Bad News” discussing the outcomes of the United States Supreme Court's ruling in relation to abortion. The paper discussed what the court said on the issue, the idea of rights to life and protection as well as alternative strategies. The paper was written in order to help educate women on what the ruling meant in regards to them and the policy makers, as well as encourage independence and publicize the women's movement occurring. Lucinda also wrote the article, "Abortion: A Major Battle is Over- - But The War Is Not" (1972). This article examines the Supreme Court's pro-abortion ruling.
