= Sisterhood Is Powerful =

1970 feminist anthology by Robin Morgan

Sisterhood Is Powerful: An Anthology of Writings from the Women's Liberation Movement
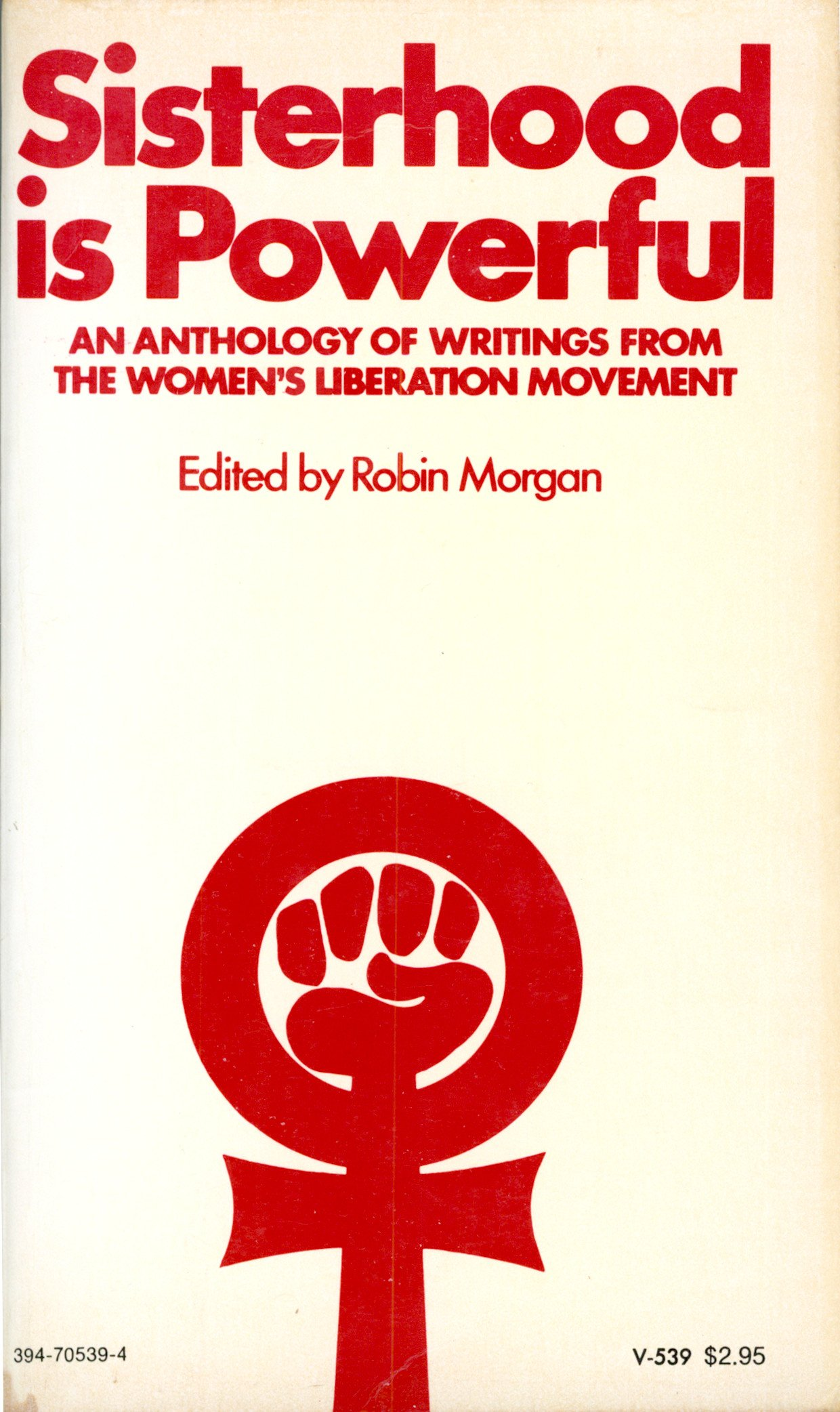
- Cover of the first edition
- Editor: Robin Morgan
- Language: English
- Publisher: Vintage Books
- Publication date: 1970
- Publication place: United States
- Media type: Print
- Pages: 602
- ISBN: 0-394-70539-4
- OCLC: 96157
- LC Class: 70117694
- Followed by: Sisterhood Is Global: The International Women's Movement Anthology

Sisterhood Is Powerful: An Anthology of Writings from the Women's Liberation Movement is a 1970 anthology of feminist writings edited by Robin Morgan, a feminist poet and founding member of New York Radical Women. It is one of the first widely available anthologies of second-wave feminism. It is both a consciousness-raising analysis and a call-to-action. Sisterhood Is Global: The International Women's Movement Anthology (1984) is the follow-up to Sisterhood Is Powerful. After Sisterhood Is Global came its follow-up, Sisterhood Is Forever: The Women's Anthology for a New Millennium (2003).

== Background ==
Kathie Sarachild coined the phrase "sisterhood is powerful" in 1968, in a flier she wrote for the keynote speech she gave for New York Radical Women's first public action at the convocation of the Jeannette Rankin Brigade.

== Contents ==
The collection addresses several major issues including "the need for radical feminism, the discrimination women experienced from men in the political left, and the blatant sexism faced in the workplace."

It includes classic feminist essays and writings by activists such as Naomi Weisstein, Kate Millett, Eleanor Holmes Norton, Florynce Kennedy, Frances M. Beal, Lucinda Cisler, Joreen, Marge Piercy, Lynn Strongin, and Mary Daly, as well as historical documents including the N.O.W. Bill of Rights, excerpts from the SCUM Manifesto, the Redstockings Manifesto, and historical documents from W.I.T.C.H. It also includes a document from the Black Women's Liberation Group from Mount Vernon; this piece demonstrates the race-conscious "sisterhood" that some second-wave black feminists demanded and was used by many second-wave feminists to communicate this demand. It also includes what Morgan coined "verbal karate": useful quotes and statistics about women.

== Reception ==
The anthology was cited by the New York Public Library as one of the "New York Public Library's Books of the [20th] Century". However, Chile, China and South Africa banned the anthology.

== Legacy ==
The Oxford English Dictionary credits Robin Morgan with first using the term "herstory" in print in the book. Concerning the feminist organization W.I.T.C.H., Morgan wrote:

The fluidity and wit of the witches is evident in the ever-changing acronym: the basic, original title was Women's International Terrorist Conspiracy from Hell [...] and the latest heard at this writing is Women Inspired to Commit Herstory."

Morgan established the first American feminist grant-giving organization, The Sisterhood Is Powerful Fund, with the royalties from Sisterhood Is Powerful.

== In popular culture ==
In a 2019 Paris Fashion Week show, Christian Dior's creative director Maria Grazia Chiuri debuted a collection of T-shirts that read Sisterhood Is Powerful, Sisterhood Is Global and Sisterhood Is Forever, respectively.

The 2016 coming-of-age film 20th Century Women prominently features the book, being lent to Jamie (Lucas Jade Zumann) by Abbie (Greta Gerwig).
