= Carol Hanisch =

American radical feminist activist (born 1942)

- Born: 1942 (age 83–84); Iowa, U.S.
- Occupation: Activist
- Notable work: "The personal is political" (1969)
- Movement: Radical feminism

Carol Hanisch (born 1942) is an American radical feminist activist. She was an important member of New York Radical Women and Redstockings. She is best known for popularizing the phrase "the personal is political" in a 1969 essay of the same name. She does not take responsibility of the phrase, stating in her 2006 updated essay, with a new introduction, that did not name it that, or in fact use it in the essay at all. Instead she claims that the title was done by the editors of Notes from the Second Year: Women's Liberation (where it was published), Shulamith Firestone and Anne Koedt. She also conceived the 1968 Miss America protest and was one of the four women who hung a women's liberation banner over the balcony at the Miss America Pageant, disrupting the proceedings.

== Early life ==
Hanisch was born and raised on a small farm in rural Iowa, and worked as a wire services reporter in Des Moines before leaving to join the Delta Ministry in Mississippi in 1965, inspired by the Freedom Summer reports the year before. There, she met the co-founders of the Southern Conference Education Fund (SCEF), Anne Braden and husband Carl Braden, who hired her to run the SCEF NY office.

== Feminist activism and writing ==
By early 1968, Hanisch had secured the SCEF offices for the weekly meetings of the New York Radical Women, and it remained their base until the group dissolved in the early 1970s.

In 1970, her most famous essay, 'the personal is political' was published in Notes from the Second Year: Women's Liberation. Hanisch states that the essay was named by the two editors Shulie Firestone and Anne Koedt. In the essay, the phrase is actually not used at all but it instead states: One of the first things we discover in these groups is that personal problems are political problems. There are no personal solutions at this time. There is only collective action for a collective solution.

She co-founded and currently co-edits with Kathy Scarbrough Meeting Ground online, the third version of "Meeting Ground." The statement of purpose from 1977 describes itself as providing "an ongoing place to hammer out ideas about theory, strategy and tactics for the women’s liberation movement and for the general radical movement of working men and women."

In 1996, Hanisch delivered a speech at the 30th Anniversary Symposium on “China’s Great Proletarian Cultural Revolution” at the New School for Social Research. The speech was titled "Impact of the Chinese Cultural Revolution on the Women's Liberation Movement." Hanisch credited William H. Hinton's book Fanshen as well as the works of Mao Zedong for influencing the emerging women's liberation movement of the 1960s. She cites both Black Liberation and Maoist theory, and in particular Maoist notions of "speaking bitterness" and "self-criticism", for helping to develop the idea of consciousness raising groups within American radical feminism.

In 2013 Hanisch, along with Scarbrough, Ti-Grace Atkinson and Kathie Sarachild initiated "Forbidden Discourse: The Silencing of Feminist Criticism of 'Gender'", which they described as an "open statement from 48 radical feminists from seven countries" and promoted Gender-critical feminism. In August 2014, Michelle Goldberg in The New Yorker described it as expressing their “alarm” at “threats and attacks, some of them physical, on individuals and organizations daring to challenge the currently fashionable concept of gender.”
