= Chude Pam Allen =

American activist (born 1943)

- Born: Pamela Parker; 1943 (age 82–83); Pennsylvania, United States
- Other names: Pamela Allen; Chude Pam Parker Allen
- Education: Carleton College
- Occupation: Activist
- Spouse: Robert L. Allen (m. 1965, divorced)

Chude Pamela Parker Allen (born 1943) is an American activist of the civil rights movement and women's liberation movement. She was a founder of New York Radical Women.

== Education and civil rights movement activism ==
Pamela Parker was born in Pennsylvania in 1943. She grew up Episcopalian and lived in Solebury, Pennsylvania. Her mother was a nursery school teacher and her father worked as a manager in a rubber goods factory.

Allen attended Carleton College in Northfield, Minnesota, where she studied religion. She joined the Students for a Democratic Society. During the summer of 1963, she was a counselor at the Church of the Advocate in Philadelphia, where she lived with Paul Washington, the church's African-American rector, and his family. In her junior year, she was one of 13 white exchange students at the Spelman College in Spring 1964. There she attended a seminar on nonviolence conducted by Staughton Lynd and became involved with the Committee on Appeal for Human Rights. She volunteered as a Freedom School teacher in Holly Springs, Mississippi, for Freedom Summer. During her time in Mississippi, Allen was romantically involved with Ralph Featherstone, a black Freedom Summer organizer.

During her senior year, she was an activist on campus and spoke for the Student Nonviolent Coordinating Committee. She married African-American activist Robert L. Allen in 1965. Following her graduation from Carleton, she moved to New York City, where she worked at an agency that found homes for foster children.

== Women's liberation movement ==
Allen was a key activist in the white women's liberation movement and she advocated for greater attention to be given to racism within the movement. She co-founded New York Radical Women in 1967. The group planned the Jeannette Rankin Brigade action. Allen later left the group, criticizing their views of motherhood and rejection of traditional roles for women. She worked for The Guardian in early 1968. She moved to San Francisco, where she joined the feminist group Sudsofloppen. Based on her experiences with the group, she wrote the influential pamphlet Free Space: A Perspective on the Small Group in Women's Liberation, in which she outlined a four-stage method of consciousness raising. The work was influenced by humanistic psychology.

She was editor for the newspaper of the Union Women's Alliance to Gain Equality (Union WAGE). She was also involved with the Bridal Fair action of 1969, the Miss America protest, and International Women's Day.

She changed her name from Pamela Allen to Chude Pamela Allen.

Allen collaborated with her first husband Robert L. Allen on the 1974 book Reluctant Reformers: Racism and Social Reform Movements in the United States. She also writes poetry and has drafted two plays, The Uprising of the 20,000 and Could We Be Heard.

Allen is featured in the 2014 feminist history film She's Beautiful When She's Angry.

Allen is a member of the Bay Area Veterans of the Civil Rights Movement. She lives in San Francisco.
