= Shulamith Firestone =

American feminist activist (1945–2012)

- Firestone c. 1970
- Born: Shulamith Bath Shmuel Ben Ari Feuerstein; January 7, 1945; Ottawa, Ontario, Canada
- Died: August 28, 2012 (aged 67); New York City, U.S.
- Burial place: Wellwood Cemetery West Babylon, New York
- Education: Washington University; Art Institute of Chicago (BFA)
- Notable work: The Dialectic of Sex (1970)
- Movement: Radical feminism; Second-wave feminism
- Relatives: Tirzah Firestone (sister)

Shulamith Bath Shmuel Ben Ari Firestone (born Feuerstein; January 7, 1945 – August 28, 2012) was an American radical feminist writer and activist. She was a prominent figure in the early development of radical feminism and second-wave feminism and a founding member of three radical feminist organizations: New York Radical Women, Redstockings, and New York Radical Feminists. Within these movements, she was referred to by some as "the firebrand" and "the fireball".

In 1967, she spoke at the National Conference for New Politics in Chicago. In 1968, she organized a symbolic event referred to as "The Burial of Traditional Womanhood" and participated in the Miss America protest later that year. She protested sexual harassment at Madison Square Garden, organized abortion speakouts, and disrupted abortion legislation meetings.

In 1970, Firestone published The Dialectic of Sex: The Case for Feminist Revolution. Released in September of that year, the book became an influential text within feminist theory. The ideas presented in The Dialectic of Sex later became relevant to the development of cyberfeminism and xenofeminism, with Firestone’s arguments considered precursors to discussions about technology and gender. In addition to her work as an author, Firestone contributed to and helped edit the feminist magazine Notes.

Following her retirement from activism, Firestone was diagnosed with schizophrenia, a condition she lived with until her death in 2012. Her final published work was Airless Spaces, released in 1998. The book is a collection of short stories based on her experiences with mental illness.

A documentary titled Shulie was produced that depicted Firestone during her time as a student and traced her trajectory as a feminist thinker and writer. The original documentary, which featured Firestone herself, was never released; however, a recreation of the original was later produced.

== Biography ==
=== Early life and education ===
Firestone was born in Ottawa, Ontario, Canada on January 7, 1945. She was the second of six children and the first daughter of Kate Weiss, a German Jewish refugee who fled the Holocaust, and Sol Feuerstein, a salesman from Brooklyn. Firestone's parents were Orthodox Jews. In April 1945, when Firestone was four months old, her father participated in the liberation of the Bergen-Belsen concentration camp in Germany. (Note: The camp was liberated by the British Army's 63rd Anti-Tank Regiment, and handed over to the British Second Army and a Canadian unit.)

During her childhood, the family Anglicized their surname from Feuerstein to Firestone and relocated to St. Louis, Missouri. Her father had adopted Orthodox Judaism as a teenager and was described by Susan Faludi as exercising strict control over his children. One of Firestone's sisters, Tirzah Firestone, recalled that their father directed much of his anger toward Shulamith. Shulamith frequently objected to perceived gender-based expectations within the household. For example, when instructed by her father to make her brother's bed, she was told it was "because you're a girl". Another sister, Laya Firestone Seghi, recounted instances of Sol and Shulamith threatening to kill one another.

Firestone's mother was described by Tirzah Firestone as holding a "passive view of femininity" shaped by traditional ideas of Jewish womanhood.

Firestone skipped a year of high school to join her older brother Daniel at the Washington University in St. Louis. She attended English and History courses from 1961 to 1963, then transferred on full scholarship to the School of the Art Institute of Chicago, from which she earned a Bachelor of Fine Arts degree in painting in 1967. While studying in Chicago, she lived on the North Side and worked as a mail sorter at the post office. In 1967, she founded in Chicago the first independent women's liberation group since the suffrage movement, named Westside.

=== Activism ===
In St. Louis, Firestone worked as an organiser with the local chapter of the Congress of Racial Equality, and was briefly involved with the Catholic Worker Movement.

==== Radical feminism ====
Firestone was identified as a radical feminist due to her belief that women constitute an oppressed sex class and that women's liberation could only be achieved through the revolutionary dismantling of the global patriarchal system. She drew upon the works of Karl Marx and Friedrich Engels, while also critiquing them for not offering a class-independent analysis of women's oppression. Firestone expanded their theoretical framework to include the subordination of women as a distinct and foundational category of analysis.

In her seminal 1970 work The Dialectic of Sex: The Case for Feminist Revolution, Firestone wrote, "Feminists have to question, not just all of Western culture, but the organization of culture itself, and further, even the organization of nature". One of the central arguments in the book was that women's oppression originated in their biological capacity for pregnancy and childbirth—a condition she argued enabled male domination. Firestone advocated for the development and use of advanced reproductive technologies to liberate women from childbirth. These views on reproduction and technology were controversial and elicited strong responses from other feminists. Her work has also been cited as a precursor to cyberfeminism.

Firestone's participation in feminist groups was also characterized as radical, particularly because they addressed subjects that were rarely discussed publicly by women at the time. These included topics such as the female orgasm and forced abortion practices.

==== Women's Liberation Movement ====
In 1967, at the age of 22, Firestone attended the National Conference for New Politics in Chicago, which took place from August 31 to September 1, along with approximately 2,000 other young activists. At the conference, she met Jo Freeman, and the two connected over their shared frustration regarding the lack of attention given to women's issues. Together, they submitted a resolution advocating for equitable marital and property laws and for "complete control by women of their own bodies".

The resolution was deemed insufficiently important for floor discussion. Although Firestone and Freeman succeeded in having their statement added to the end of the agenda, it was not addressed during the conference. When several women, including Firestone, attempted to speak in protest, the conference director, William F. Pepper, declined to recognize them. As five women approached the podium to express their objection, Pepper reportedly patted Firestone on the head and said, "Cool down, little girl; we have more important things to talk about than women's problems".

Following the conference, Firestone and Freeman organized a meeting that led to the formation of the first women's liberation group in Chicago. The group was named Westside, based on its meeting location in Freeman's apartment on the West Side of the city.

A few months later, Freeman began publishing a newsletter titled Voice of the Women's Liberation Movement, which was distributed nationally and internationally. The newsletter helped define and popularize the emerging women’s liberation movement. Several members of the Westside group went on to establish additional feminist organizations, including the Chicago Women's Liberation Union.

==== New York Radical Women ====
In October 1967, after helping to establish the Westside group in Chicago, Firestone moved to New York City to flee a physically abusive partner. In an unpublished work, she described incidents of abuse, including being struck with enough force to dislodge one of her teeth. She had only told her sister Laya and a male friend about the violence.

After relocating to New York, Firestone co-founded the New York Radical Women, one of the earliest radical feminist groups of the second-wave feminist movement. Other founding members included Robin Morgan, Carol Hanisch, and Chude Pam Allen. The group was the first women's liberation organization established in New York City.

The group authored a manifesto titled New York Radical Women's Principles, which emphasized a collective rejection of historical narratives centered solely on male perspectives. The manifesto argued that women’s history had been systematically suppressed and called on those who supported feminist ideals to unite in opposition to that suppression. It also explicitly stated the group's belief that violence was not a legitimate or effective means for achieving social change.

The New York Radical Women implemented a psychological program considered radical at the time. The program was designed to encourage women to see themselves as strong, independent, and assertive. This approach was intended to challenge societal norms that positioned women as subordinate to men and to counteract the broader cultural devaluation of women.

==== Redstockings ====
The New York Radical Women fell apart in early 1969. To continue the work of consciousness raising groups, Firestone and Ellen Willis co-founded a new radical feminist organization called Redstockings. The group took its name from the Blue Stockings Society, an 18th-century women's literary group. Notable members of Redstockings included Kathie Sarachild and Carol Hanisch.

Redstockings promoted the importance of presenting history through female perspectives and supported the idea that women writers could serve as a force of resistance against patriarchy. The group regarded consciousness raising as a key method for examining and challenging women's oppression. Members engaged in discussions based on personal experiences—such as childhood, work, and motherhood—rather than relying solely on written texts. Through this practice, participants sought to identify shared patterns, formulate generalizations, and observe their own feelings and experiences as a means of developing political awareness. The goal of these discussions was to revise existing social narratives and promote broader social change. Redstockings did not aim to become a service or large-scale membership organization.

In the Redstockings Manifesto, the group asserted the systemic and class-based nature of women’s oppression. The manifesto stated:

Women are an oppressed class. Our oppression is total, affecting every facet of our lives. We are exploited as sex objects, breeders, domestic servants, and cheap labor. We are considered inferior beings, whose only purpose is to enhance men's lives. Our humanity is denied. Our prescribed behavior is enforced by the threat of physical violence.

Because we have lived so intimately with our oppressors, in isolation from each other, we have been kept from seeing our personal suffering as a political condition. This creates the illusion that a woman's relationship with her man is a matter of interplay between two unique personalities, and can be worked out individually. In reality, every such relationship is a class relationship, and the conflicts between individual men and women are political conflicts that can only be solved collectively.

We identify the agents of our oppression as men. Male supremacy is the oldest, most basic form of domination. All other forms of exploitation and oppression (racism, capitalism, imperialism, etc.) are extensions of male supremacy: men dominate women, a few men dominate the rest. All power structures throughout history have been male-dominated and male-oriented. Men have controlled all political, economic and cultural institutions and backed up this control with physical force. They have used their power to keep women in an inferior position. All men receive economic, sexual, and psychological benefits from male supremacy. All men have oppressed women.

Like the New York Radical Women, Redstockings emphasized the need to revolutionize society at a psychological level. The group encouraged women to explore their individuality and personal experiences as a means to resist male dominance. It was believed that reclaiming personal power could lead to broader societal transformation.

Among the group's public actions was the publication of a journal and participation the 1968 Miss America protest. The Redstockings disbanded in 1970.

==== New York Radical Feminists ====
In late 1969, following her departure from Redstockings, Firestone co-founded the New York Radical Feminists with Anne Koedt. She left the group by June 1970 in the wake of a split provoked by Susan Brownmiller's leadership challenge.

==== Other actions ====
Firestone participated in numerous protests and political actions focused on feminist issues. In March 1969, she organized the first abortion speak-out, held at Judson Memorial Church. The event featured twelve women whom Firestone had encouraged to publicly share their personal experiences with abortion.

The feminist groups that Firestone co-founded also engaged in a range of demonstrations and street performances. These actions included disrupting abortion law hearings and protesting at venues that restricted entry to women who were not accompanied by men. One notable demonstration was the "Burial of Traditional Womanhood," held in 1968 at Arlington National Cemetery, where participants conducted a symbolic funeral for a dummy representing the stereotypical housewife.

Additional actions included releasing mice at Madison Square Garden during a bridal fair, intended to disrupt the event and critique commercialized representations of marriage, and participating in public ogling of men on Wall Street as a means of drawing attention to the issue of sexual harassment.

=== Post-political activity ===
By the time The Dialectic of Sex was published in October 1970, Firestone had withdrawn from political activism. In the early 1970s, she moved to St. Marks Place and worked as a painter. She pursued a multimedia project of her own, described as a “female Whole Earth Catalogue”, which led her to take up a summer fellowship at an art school in Nova Scotia. Following that, she worked as a typist at the Massachusetts Institute of Technology offices in Cambridge.

Between 1978 and 1980, she participated in the CETA Artists Project. As part of the program, she taught art workshops at Arthur Kill State Prison for Men and created a series of murals. These included a mural for the City Arts Workshop on the Lower East Side, designed for a nursing home garden at the American Nursing Home located at 26 Avenue B, and another mural created with artist Art Guerra on an outdoor wall in Richmond Hill, Queens, on 116th Street near Jamaica Avenue.

==== Struggle with mental illness ====
In the mid-1970s, Firestone began experiencing symptoms of mental illness. According to Susan Brownmiller, already in the first half of the 1970s Firestone blamed Brownmiller's actions for her deteriorated state.

In May 1974, Firestone returned to her family home in St. Louis after learning of the death of her brother, Daniel, who had not spoken to her since beating her over relinquishing religious observance in her sophomore year, and had also abandoned his religion since. Initially informed that he had died in a car accident, Firestone later discovered that the actual cause of death was a gunshot wound to the chest; the apparent suicide was concealed by the family until an Orthodox burial had been completed. Firestone refused to attend her brother's funeral and later wrote, “Whether murder or suicide, afterlife or no, [his death] contributed to my own growing madness.” In 1977, on hearing that her parents, Sol and Kate Firestone, were about to emigrate to Israel, she traveled to St. Louis to collect her paintings. After falling out with her father, who threatened to disown her, she formally disavowed her parents in a certified letter. According to Firestone's sister Tirzah, their father's death in 1981 caused the onset of Shulamith's psychosis: "She lost that ballast he somehow provided.”

In early 1987, Firestone's sister Laya, responding to landlord and neighbour complaints at Firestone's 2nd Street address, took her to the Payne Whitney Psychiatric Clinic where Firestone was diagnosed with paranoid schizophrenia. Firestone was involuntarily hospitalized for five months at a residential facility in White Plains and then repeatedly at Beth Israel Medical Center over the next several years. According to her psychiatrist, Dr. Margaret Fraser, she suffered from a severe form of Capgras delusion, a condition in which she believed that the people in her life were impostors hiding behind "masks of their own faces." In early 1990, she was evicted from her 2nd Street studio after refusing to be represented in court by her friends (led by Kate Millett), and her art was thrown in the trash.

By 1993, a support group formed under the guidance of Dr. Fraser and led by Lourdes Cintron of the Visiting Nurse Service helped Firestone stay out of the hospital. She refused to discuss feminism; nonetheless, by 1995, she had started writing her second book. In the final years of the 1990s, the support network disbanded as Dr. Fraser relocated and Lourdes Cintron fell ill. Firestone was left without regular care and continued to struggle with her condition until her death.

=== Death ===
On August 28, 2012, Firestone was found deceased in her New York City apartment. The discovery was made by the building’s owner after neighbors reported a foul odor emanating from her unit. A superintendent looked through the window from the fire escape and observed her body on the floor. According to the landlord, Bob Perl, it was estimated that she had been deceased for approximately one month.

Firestone’s sister, Laya Firestone Seghi, stated that she died of natural causes. However, due to the family's adherence to Orthodox Jewish beliefs, an official autopsy was not performed, leaving unconfirmed the possibility that starvation may have contributed to her death. Reports indicated that Firestone had been living in a reclusive manner and was in poor physical and mental health in the period leading up to her death.

A commemorative essay by journalist Susan Faludi, published in The New Yorker several months later, provided additional details, citing Firestone’s long-term struggle with schizophrenia and suggesting that self-induced starvation may have been a contributing factor. A memorial service was held in her honor.

== Writing ==
=== Notes ===
Together with members of the New York Radical Feminists, Firestone contributed to the creation and editing of a feminist periodical titled Notes. The publication included Notes from the First Year (June 1968), Notes from the Second Year (1970), and Notes from the Third Year (1971), the latter edited by Anne Koedt while Firestone was on leave.

The Notes series served as a platform for radical feminist thought and aimed to inform and educate readers on issues central to the feminist movement. Topics covered in the periodical included the concept of the vaginal orgasm and the influential essay "The Personal is Political". These writings played a significant role in generating discussion and advancing the development of radical feminist theory.

=== The Women's Rights Movement in the U.S.A.: New View ===
In 1968, Firestone published an essay titled The Women's Rights Movement in the U.S.: A New View. In this work, she argued that the women's rights movement possessed the potential to become revolutionary. Firestone asserted that the movement had always been inherently radical, citing 19th-century suffragists as examples of women who challenged established institutions such as the church, white male authority, and the traditional family structure. The essay sought to counter narratives that minimized the struggles faced by women and the forms of oppression they had historically resisted.

=== The Dialectic of Sex ===
The Dialectic of Sex: The Case for Feminist Revolution (1970) was Firestone’s first book and became a foundational text of second-wave feminism. The book proposed a radical feminist framework rooted in a materialist view of history based on sex. Firestone envisioned a society free from the oppression of women and developed a theory that sought to explain and challenge the structural inequalities stemming from biological sex differences.

In the book, Firestone argued that the elimination of sexual classes would require the equivalent of a class revolution—similar to the proletariat's seizure of the means of production in Marxist theory. She proposed that women must reclaim control over reproduction, including the biological and institutional systems surrounding childbirth and child-rearing. She wrote:

Just as to ensure elimination of economic classes requires the revolt of the underclass (the proletariat) and, in a temporary dictatorship, their seizure of the means of production, so to assure the elimination of sexual classes requires the revolt of the underclass (women) and the seizure of control of reproduction: not only the full restoration to women of ownership of their own bodies, but also their [temporary] seizure of control of human fertility—the new population biology as well as all the social institutions of child-bearing and child-rearing. ... [T]he end goal of feminist revolution must be, unlike that of the first feminist movement, not just the elimination of male privilege but of the sex distinction itself: genital differences between human beings would no longer matter culturally.

Firestone synthesized the ideas of Sigmund Freud, Wilhelm Reich, Karl Marx, Frederick Engels, and Simone de Beauvoir to construct her theory. She also acknowledged the influence of Lincoln H. and Alice T. Day’s Too Many Americans (1964) and Paul R. Ehrlich’s The Population Bomb (1968).

A central theme of the book is that biological characteristics—especially women’s capacity for pregnancy—have historically determined women’s social and political roles. Firestone argued that these traits must be separated from women’s identities to achieve genuine equality. Drawing on Simone de Beauvoir’s assertion that motherhood plays a central role in women’s oppression, Firestone contended that patriarchal systems perpetuate gender inequality by defining women’s roles in terms of reproduction. She expanded on Marx’s theory of class by proposing the existence of a "sex class system," originating from biological distinctions and reinforced through the sexual division of labor both within the home and in society.

Unlike the cultural feminists of her time, Firestone rejected the idea that liberation could be achieved by asserting women’s biological superiority. Instead, she argued that human progress requires transcending nature itself, stating: "We can no longer justify the maintenance of a discriminatory sex class system on the grounds of its origin in Nature", and "The abolition of the sex class requires that women take control of the means of reproduction."

Firestone also credited the Black power movement as an inspiration, viewing its strategies for racial pride and self-determination as applicable to feminist struggle. She cited other radical movements and activists as influential in shaping her strategic approach to feminism.

Firestone characterized pregnancy and childbirth as "barbaric" and viewed the nuclear family as a key source of women’s oppression. She believed that advancements in reproductive technology—such as birth control and in vitro fertilization—could one day allow sex to be entirely separated from reproduction. She advocated for artificial reproduction, sometimes referred to as the "bottled baby," as a means of freeing women from the physical demands of childbirth.

In addition to reproductive critique, Firestone examined the dynamics of heterosexual parenting and their effects on child development. She argued that children were hindered in their growth by adult control, predetermined social roles, and their subordinate status within the family structure. Firestone believed that maternal expectations and dependence within the nuclear family made children more vulnerable to abuse and deprived them of autonomy and economic independence. To address this, she proposed the dissolution of the traditional nuclear family structure and suggested that children be raised collectively rather than by individual parents. The association of women's liberation with children's liberation drew praise from Simone de Beauvoir in Ms.

Angela Davis later criticized The Dialectic of Sex for its treatment of other forms of oppression. Davis argued that Firestone reduced all systems of exploitation—such as racism and class oppression—to extensions of sexism. She also claimed that Firestone’s analysis transposed the Oedipus complex into racial terms, which, according to Davis, reinforced racial stereotypes about Black men and women.

=== Airless Spaces ===
In 1998, Firestone published Airless Spaces, a collection of fictional short stories based on her experiences with hospitalization for schizophrenia. Drawing from personal experience, the stories depict the lives of individuals in New York City dealing with mental illness and poverty. The book explores the psychological and social challenges faced by those with mental disorders, including emotions such as shame, humiliation, fear, loneliness, and anxiety. The characters frequently experience instability in terms of both their mental health and socioeconomic conditions. Airless Spaces has been interpreted as a reflection of Firestone's own marginalization, both due to her radical feminist background and her experiences with the mental health system. The work highlights the structural and personal obstacles faced by individuals attempting to navigate psychiatric care and broader social stigma.

== Legacy ==
=== The Dialectic of Sex ===
The Dialectic of Sex: The Case for Feminist Revolution is still used in many women's studies programs. Its recommendations, such as raising children in a gender neutral fashion, mirror the ideals Firestone set out to achieve. Many of the main ideas within the book are still prominent in the feminist debate on the use of technology advancements in reproduction. The work of Shulamith Firestone is considered an origin to the combination of science and technology with critical thinking from a feminist lens. Her ideas are still shared and discussed including her belief of the necessity for more women to pursue careers in engineering and science. Firestone's views can also be found in scientific advancements such as the production of artificial sperm and eggs and how their production may lead to the elimination of differences between the sexes.

==== Cyberfeminism and xenofeminism ====
The Dialectic of Sex: The Case for Feminist Revolution also has a legacy in the branch of feminism known as cyberfeminism. Firestone anticipated what is now known today as "cyborgian feminism". Her book was a precursor to contemporary activities by cyberfeminists. Specifically it was Firestone's argument that women needed technology in order to free themselves from the obligation of reproducing. Firestone was an important theoretician who connected gender inequities to the view of women as purely child bearers, and she pushed for the increase in technology to abolish gender oppression. The ideas that Shulamith presented about technology differed to those of many other writers during her time, as she introduced technology as a tool to help ignite a feminist revolution, rather than act as a form of male violence. Firestone's work helped to spread a discourse on the general ideals of cyberfeminism. Shulamith Firestone also became a predecessor to Donna Haraway, and her cyberfeminist texts. Both of their works have similar views and aspirations, as they both address biology and are attempting to eliminate it through the use of technology. The two women envisioned a future in which individuals are more androgynous and the views of the female body are reconstructed. Similarly the works also connect how these changes affect or would affect labor roles. Shulamith's book created an understanding for gender transformation, and these themes are still a basis of cyberfeminist writing presently.

Themes in The Dialectic of Sex have ties in xenofeminism as well. Firestone's desire to free women from the burden of reproduction and eliminate the use of sex organs to define an individual's identity has connections to the ambition of xenofeminists to create a society in which all individuals are not assigned traits based on their supposed sex. Helen Hester, one of the members who helped write The Xenofeminism Manifesto, related her contributions to the ideas on feminism and technology presented by Firestone. She even credited Shulamith as one of the key theorists who contributed to the xenofeminism discourse.

=== Shulie ===
During her studies at the School of the Art Institute of Chicago Firestone was the subject of a student documentary film. In the film, she is asked questions about her views on education, art, relationships, religion, and politics. She is also shown working on her painting and photography, presenting her artwork for critique by professors, and working part-time at a post office. Never released, the film was rediscovered in the 1990s by experimental filmmaker Elisabeth Subrin, who did a frame-by-frame reshoot of the original documentary. It was released in 1997 as Shulie winning two awards, including the 1998 Los Angeles Film Critics Association award. (Note: The film also won the Experimental 1999 US Super 8; a Film & Video Fest-Screening Jury Citation 2000 New England Film & Video Festival; and Best Experimental Film Biennial 2002.)

The film depicts Firestone as a young student and her journey into becoming one of the most notable second-wave feminists and feminist authors of the 20th century. In 1998, the film was honored with the Independent/Experimental Film and Video Award by the Los Angeles Film-Critics Association, receiving acknowledgement alongside films like Saving Private Ryan, A Bug's Life, and Rushmore. Two years later, the documentary received the "Experimental Award" from the New England Film and Video Festival. The documentary was praised by The New Yorker for its use of dialectical thought (a concept featured in Firestone's work) in the production of a film set decades prior to its filming.

== Writings ==
- (1968). "The Women's Rights Movement in the U.S.: A New View". Notes from the First Year. New York: New York Radical Women.
- (1968). "The Jeanette Rankin Brigade: Woman Power?". Notes from the First Year. New York: New York Radical Women.
- (1968). "On Abortion", Notes from the First Year. New York: New York Radical Women.
- (1968). "When Women Rap about Sex". Notes from the First Year. New York: New York Radical Women.
- (1968), ed. Notes from the First Year. New York: New York Radical Women.
- (1970), ed. Notes from the Second Year. New York: New York Radical Women.
- (1970). The Dialectic of Sex: The Case for Feminist Revolution. New York: William Morrow and Company.
- (1971), with Anne Koedt, eds. Notes from the Third Year. New York: New York Radical Women.
- (1998). Airless Spaces. New York: Semiotext(e).
