= Tirzah Firestone =

American rabbi (born 1954)

Rabbi Tirzah Firestone
- Born: May 27, 1954 (age 71)
- Education: Beacon College; Pacifica Graduate Institute
- Occupations: Jungian psychotherapist; author; Jewish Renewal rabbi
- Relatives: Shulamith Firestone (sister)

Tirzah Firestone (born May 27, 1954) is an American analytical psychotherapist, author, and Jewish Renewal rabbi. She is the founding rabbi of Congregation Nevei Kodesh, a Jewish Renewal synagogue in Boulder, Colorado, and is now Rabbi Emerita there.

== Early life and education ==
Tirzah Firestone was raised in an Orthodox Jewish family in St. Louis, Missouri, as the fifth of six children born to Sol and Kate Firestone. She is the younger sister of Shulamith Firestone, and went to Hebrew day schools through high school. Firestone earned her master's degree in Holistic Counseling from Beacon College in 1982 and her doctorate in depth psychology from Pacifica Graduate Institute in Santa Barbara, California, in 2015. After graduating, she spent an extended period living in Israel and working on kibbutzim Ma'ale Gilboa and Moshav Amirim. She also apprenticed in Jerusalem with Rabanit Leah Sharabi, the wife of the Kabbalist Rabbi Mordechai Sharabi, who influenced her greatly.

== Career ==
Firestone was ordained by Rabbi Zalman Schachter-Shalomi in 1992, and is a leader in the international Jewish Renewal movement.

She is widely known for her work on Jewish feminism and the modern applications of Jewish mystical wisdom. She teaches nationally on Jewish ancestral healing and the common boundary between ancient Jewish heritage and contemporary psychology.

Firestone is an active member of Aleph: Alliance for Jewish Renewal (1994–present) and the associated Ohalah Rabbinic Association (2003–present). She is a past national co-chair of T'ruah: The Rabbinic Call for Human Rights (2009–2010), and is currently serving on the board of the Yesod Foundation (1997–present).

== Personal life ==
In her memoir, Firestone tells the story of how her first husband inspired her return to Judaism by means of his own faith and love of Judaism. Firestone remarried in 1999 to David Friedman. Together, they have three children.

== Publication ==
=== Books ===
- Wounds into Wisdom: Healing Intergenerational Jewish Trauma (Monkfish Press, 2019)
- The Receiving: Reclaiming Jewish Women’s Wisdom (Harper San Francisco, 2003)
- With Roots in Heaven: One Woman's Passionate Journey into the Heart of Her Faith (Plume, 1999)

=== Articles ===
- "Intergenerational Trauma and the Patriarchy," published in Tikkun Magazine, Spring 2019.
- "War and Peace: Intertwining Threads in the Jewish Tradition," in The Warrior and the Pacifist: Competing Motifs in Buddhism, Judaism, Christianity, and Islam Lester Kurtz, Ed., Routledge Press, 2018.
- "Trauma Legacies in the Middle East", published in Tikkun Magazine, 2014, 29 (3): 6–10.
- "The Jewish Cultural Complex," published in Psychological Perspectives: A Quarterly Journal of Jungian Thought, Vol 57, No 3, August, 2014.
- "At the Altar of Consciousness: The Individuation of God and Abraham", published in Psychological Perspectives: A Quarterly Journal of Jungian Thought, Volume 56, 2013.
- “Transforming Our Stories Through Midrash”, in New Jewish Feminism: Probing the Past, Forging the Future, edited by Rabbi Elyse Goldstein, Jewish Lights Publishing, Woodstock, VT, 2009.
- “Flatbread in Feeble Times”, in The Women’s Seder Sourcebook: Rituals and Readings for Use at the Passover Seder, Edited by Anisfeld, Mohr & Spector, Jewish Lights Publishing, Woodstock, VT, 2003.

=== CDs ===
- "Ashreynu! (How Lucky We Are!) Jewish Chants for Meditation and Prayer" with Lisa Antosofsky, and Sheldon Sands.
- "The Woman's Kabbalah: Ecstatic Jewish Practices for Women", Sounds True, Boulder, Colorado, 2000.
