= New York Radical Women =

American feminist group (1967–1969)

- Abbreviation: NYRW
- Formation: 1967
- Founders: Robin Morgan; Carol Hanisch; Shulamith Firestone; Pam Allen
- Founded at: New York City, U.S.
- Dissolved: 1969; 57 years ago

Notes
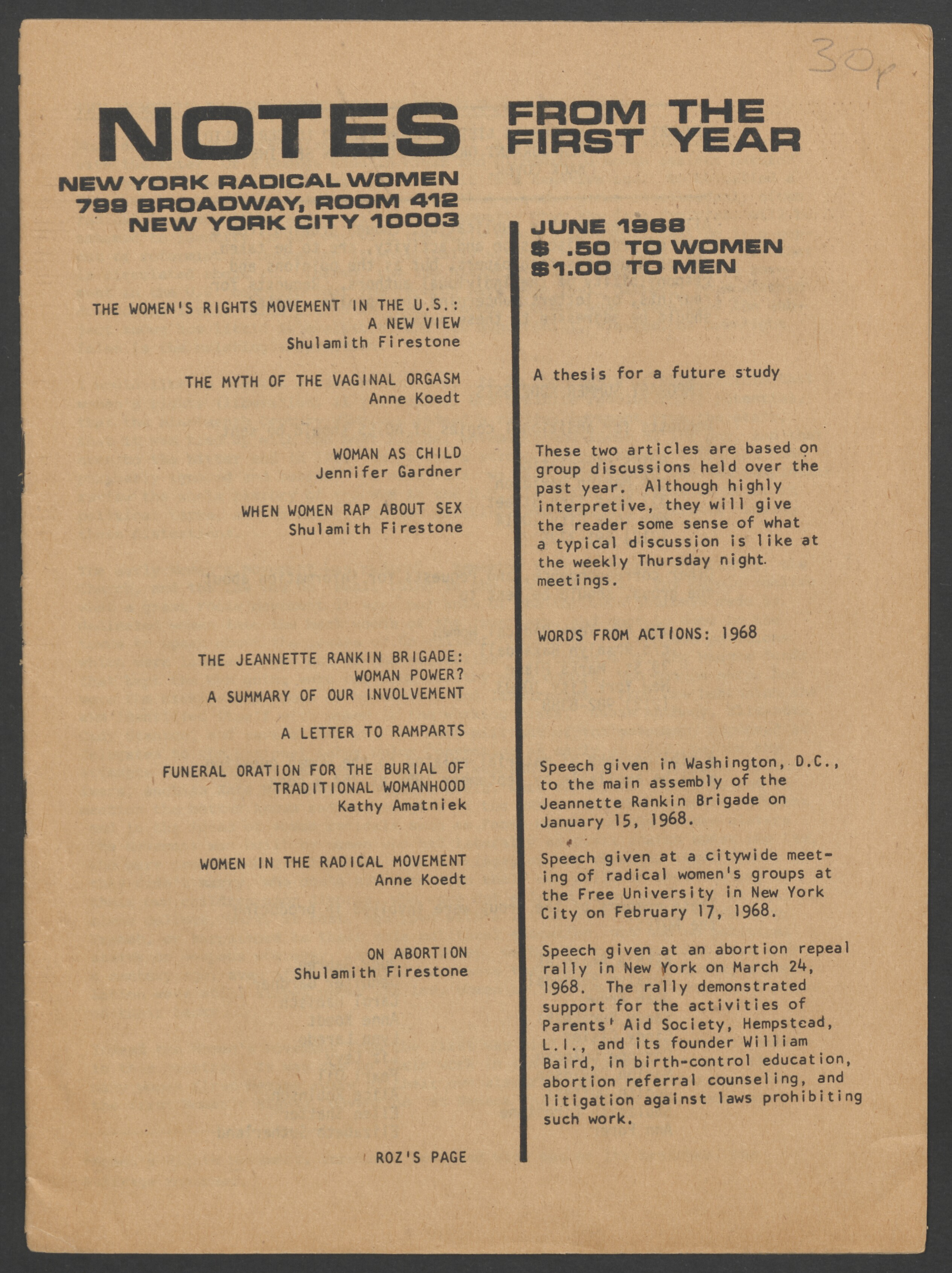
- Cover of Notes from the First Year (1968)
- Editors: Shulamith Firestone; Anne Koedt; Anita Rapone; Ellen Levine
- Categories: Radical feminism
- Frequency: Annually
- Publisher: New York Radical Women
- First issue: June 1968
- Final issue Number: 1971; 55 years ago Vol 3
- Country: United States
- Based in: New York City

New York Radical Women (NYRW) was an early second-wave radical feminist group that existed from 1967 to 1969. They drew nationwide media attention when they unfurled a banner inside the 1968 Miss America pageant displaying the words "Women's Liberation".

== Origins ==
We take the woman’s side in everything. We ask not if something is “reformist”, “radical”, “revolutionary”, or “moral.” We ask: is it good for women or bad for women?

— New York Radical Women statement of principles

The protest group was founded in New York City in late 1967, by former television child star Robin Morgan, Carol Hanisch, Shulamith Firestone, and Pam Allen. Early members included Ros Baxandall, Pat Mainardi, Irene Peslikis, Kathie Sarachild, and Ellen Willis. New York Radical Women were a group of young friends in their twenties who were part of the New Left, who had grown tired of the male-dominated civil rights and anti-war movements, and men who they saw as still preferring their female counterparts to stay at home. Because Carol Hanisch was the head of the New York office of the Southern Conference Educational Fund (SCEF), by early 1968, Hanisch had secured the SCEF offices for the weekly meetings of New York Radical Women, and it remained their base until the group dissolved in the early 1970s.

== Protests ==
New York Radical Women's first public action was at the convocation of the Jeannette Rankin Brigade. Members of the group led an alternative protest event, a "burial of traditional womanhood", held in Arlington National Cemetery. The liturgy was written and recited by founding member Peggy Dobbins. Kathie Sarachild wrote a flier for the keynote speech she gave at the convocation, and in this flier she coined the phrase "Sisterhood is powerful".

The group also participated in the Miss America protest with their brochure No More Miss America in Atlantic City, New Jersey, on September 7, 1968. About 400 women were drawn together from across the United States to a protest outside the event. The women symbolically threw a number of "feminine" products into a large trash can. These included mops, pots and pans, Playboy magazines, false eyelashes, high-heeled shoes, curlers, hairspray, makeup, girdles, corsets, and bras, items the protestors called "instruments of female torture." Carol Hanisch, one of the protest organizers, said "We had intended to burn it, but the police department, since we were on the boardwalk, wouldn't let us do the burning." A New York Post story about the protest made an analogy between the feminist protest and Vietnam War protesters who burned their draft cards. It has been argued there was no bra burning, nor did anyone take off her bra. A local news story reporting on the event did report there was a burning of bras and other items. It said "as the bras, girdles, falsies, curlers, and copies of popular women's magazines burned in the 'Freedom Trash Can'..." Dobbins was arrested for spraying Toni permanent wave solution around the mayor's box. She used Toni, because it was a sponsor of the pageant.

Hanisch said, "Up until this time, we hadn't done a lot of actions yet. We were a very small movement. It was kind of a gutsy thing to do. Miss America was this 'American pie' icon. Who would dare criticize this?" Along with tossing the items into the trash can, they marched with signs, passed out pamphlets, and crowned a live sheep, comparing the beauty pageant to livestock competitions at county fairs. A small group bought tickets and entered the hall. While 1967 Miss America, Debra Barnes Snodgrass, was giving her farewell address, four protestors unfurled a bed sheet from the balcony that said "Women's Liberation" and began to shout. They were quickly removed by police but drew coverage by newspapers from across the United States. "The media picked up on the bra part", Hanisch said later. "I often say that if they had called us 'girdle burners', every woman in America would have run to join us."

In January 1969, the last event they attended was the Counter-Inauguration in Washington D.C. The protest targeted women who supported the Vietnam War. Protestors were sent invitations telling them not to bring flowers or even to cry at the 'burial', but to be prepared to bury traditional female roles.

== Publications ==
NYRW was influential in the burgeoning women in print movement, which sought to establish alternative communications networks of feminist periodicals, presses, and bookstores created by and for women. Second-wave feminists were suspicious of the mainstream press and alternative New Left publications, which were often sexist in their content and editorial policies. The group published Notes from the First Year in 1968, which was the watershed year for separatist feminist publications. Over 560 feminist publications were published in the following five years.

Notes from the First Year is based on speeches given by members and discussions held at the weekly meetings of the New York Radical Women in 1968. This pamphlet was part of a movement of mimeographed movement journals that coincided with the new radical feminism erupting in the United States. Many pieces from this pamphlet were foundational in the development of the nascent discipline of women and gender studies. The pamphlet notably marks the first appearance of the theory that would later grow into Anne Koedt's well-known pamphlet and book, The Myth of the Vaginal Orgasm.

Notes from the Second Year, published in 1970, was created in response to the popularity and demand for Notes from the First Year. It was produced as a radical feminist periodical to present new ideas and clarify relevant political issues. Articles chosen were seen to be politically important and/or influential and have the potential to open up further debate. With its choice to publish new material rather than material that had already been widely circulated, the publication notably marks the first appearance of foundational women and gender studies theories such as Carol Hanisch's "The Personal Is Political", and Kate Millett's "Sexual Politics: A Manifesto for Revolution", which would later become part of her classic feminist book Sexual Politics.

"Principles" by New York Radical Women was included in the 1970 anthology Sisterhood Is Powerful edited by Robin Morgan.

== Dissolution ==
By 1969, ideological differences split the group into a radical feminist faction and a socialist feminist (or "politico") faction. Tension grew between the two splinter groups until January 1969 when the organization fell apart. Socialist feminists like Robin Morgan left to form Women's International Terrorist Conspiracy from Hell (W.I.T.C.H.), while radical feminists led by Shulamith Firestone and Ellen Willis started Redstockings.

== See also ==
- Consciousness raising
