= Consciousness raising =

Activism which use awareness campaigns

Consciousness raising (also called awareness raising) is a form of activism and identity politics popularized by United States feminists in the late 1960s. It often takes the form of a group of people attempting to focus the attention of a wider group on some cause or condition. Common issues include diseases (e.g. breast cancer, AIDS), conflicts (e.g. the Darfur genocide, global warming), movements (e.g. Greenpeace, PETA, Earth Hour) and political parties or politicians. Since informing the populace of a public concern is often regarded as the first step to changing how the institutions handle it, raising awareness is often the first activity in which any advocacy group engages.

However, in practice, raising awareness is often combined with other activities, such as fundraising, membership drives, support groups or advocacy, in order to harness and/or sustain the motivation of new supporters which may be at its highest just after they have learned and digested the new information.

The term awareness raising is used in the Yogyakarta Principles against discriminatory attitudes and LGBT stereotypes as well as the Convention on the Rights of Persons with Disabilities to combat stereotypes, prejudices and harmful practices toward people with disabilities.

== Terminology ==
Until the early 17th century, English speakers used the word "consciousness" in the sense of "moral knowledge of right or wrong"—a concept today referred to as "conscience".

== Issues and methods ==
=== In feminism ===
Consciousness raising groups were formed by New York Radical Women, an early Women's Liberation group in New York City, and quickly spread throughout the United States. In November 1967, a group including Shulamith Firestone, Anne Koedt, Kathie Sarachild (originally Kathie Amatniek), and Carol Hanisch began meeting in Koedt's apartment. Meetings often involved "going around the room and talking" about issues in their own lives. The phrase "consciousness raising" was coined to describe the process when Kathie Sarachild took up the phrase from Anne Forer:

In the Old Left, they used to say that the workers don't know they're oppressed, so we have to raise their consciousness. One night at a meeting I said, 'Would everybody please give me an example from their own life on how they experienced oppression as a woman? I need to hear it to raise my own consciousness.' Kathie was sitting behind me and the words rang in her mind. From then on she sort of made it an institution and called it consciousness-raising.

— Anne Forer

On Thanksgiving 1968, Kathie Sarachild presented A Program for Feminist Consciousness Raising, at the First National Women's Liberation Conference near Chicago, Illinois, in which she explained the principles behind consciousness-raising and outlined a program for the process that the New York groups had developed over the past year. Groups founded by former members of New York Radical Women—in particular Redstockings, founded out of the breakup of the NYRW in 1969, and New York Radical Feminists—promoted consciousness raising and distributed mimeographed sheets of suggesting topics for consciousness raising group meetings. New York Radical Feminists organized neighborhood-based c.r. groups in Manhattan, Brooklyn, and Queens, involving as many as four hundred women in c.r. groups at its peak. Over the next few years, small-group consciousness raising spread rapidly in cities and suburbs throughout the United States. By 1971, the Chicago Women's Liberation Union, which had already organized several consciousness raising groups in Chicago, described small consciousness raising groups as "the backbone of the Women's Liberation Movement". Susan Brownmiller, a member of the West Village (Note: A consciousness raising group organized by the New York Radical Feminists.) would later write that small-group consciousness raising "was the movement's most successful form of female bonding, and the source of most of its creative thinking. Some of the small groups stayed together for more than a decade".

"In 1973, probably the height of CR, 100,000 women in the United States belonged to CR groups."

Early mid-century feminists argued that women were isolated from each other, and as a result many problems in women's lives were misunderstood as "personal", or as the results of conflicts between the personalities of individual men and women, rather than systematic forms of oppression. Raising consciousness meant helping oneself and helping others to become politically conscious. Consciousness raising groups aimed to get a better understanding of women's oppression by bringing women together to discuss and analyze their lives, without interference from the presence of men.

While explaining the theory behind consciousness raising in a 1973 talk, Kathie Sarachild remarked that "From the beginning of consciousness-raising ... there has been no one method of raising consciousness. What really counts in consciousness-raising are not methods, but results. The only 'methods' of consciousness raising are essentially principles. They are the basic radical political principles of going to the original sources, both historic and personal, going to people—women themselves, and going to experience for theory and strategy". However, most consciousness raising groups did follow a similar pattern for meeting and discussion. Meetings would usually be held about once a week, with a small group of women, often in the living room of one of the members. Meetings were women-only, and usually involved going around the room for each woman to talk about a predetermined subject—for example, "When you think about having a child, would you rather have a boy or a girl?"—speaking from her own experience, with no formal leader for the discussion and few rules for directing or limiting discussion. (Some c.r. groups did implement rules designed to give every woman a chance to speak, to prevent interruptions, etc.) Speaking from personal experience was used as a basis for further discussion and analysis based on the first-hand knowledge that was shared.

Some feminist advocates of consciousness raising argued that the process allowed women to analyze the conditions of their own lives, and to discover ways in which what had seemed like isolated, individual problems (such as needing an abortion, surviving rape, conflicts between husbands and wives over housework, etc.) actually reflected common conditions faced by all women. As Sarachild wrote in 1969, "We assume that our feelings are telling us something from which we can learn... that our feelings mean something worth analyzing... that our feelings are saying something political, something reflecting fear that something bad will happen to us or hope, desire, knowledge that something good will happen to us. ... In our groups, let's share our feelings and pool them. Let's let ourselves go and see where our feelings lead us. Our feelings will lead us to ideas and then to actions".

Ellen Willis wrote in 1984 that consciousness raising has often been "misunderstood and disparaged as a form of therapy", but that it was, in fact, in its time and context, "the primary method of understanding women's condition" and constituted "the movement's most successful organizing tool". At the same time, she saw the lack of theory and emphasis on personal experience as concealing "prior political and philosophical assumptions".

However, some in the feminist movement criticised consciousness raising groups as "trivial" and apolitical.

=== Through poetry ===
Historically, poetry has been used as a consciousness-raising tactic by consciousness-raising groups. Activist and writer Audre Lorde was noted to have been one of many scholars who wrote of poetry as a means of communication for women of color activist and resistance groups. This focus has also been studied by other feminist scholars as a new approach to women's literary writing experience, and the usage of critical consciousness through the creation of art as a liberatory praxis. Art as a liberatory praxis has also been explored through a radical queer lens through a number of publications and journals such as Sinister Wisdom and Conditions, online publications with an emphasis on lesbian writing.

=== For LGBT rights ===
In the 1960s, consciousness-raising caught on with gay liberation activists, who formed the first "coming-out groups" which helped participants come out of the closet among welcoming, tolerant individuals and share personal stories about coming out. The idea of coming out as a tool of consciousness-raising had been preceded by even earlier opinions from German theorists such as Magnus Hirschfeld, Iwan Bloch and Karl Heinrich Ulrichs, all of whom saw self-disclosure as a means of self-emancipation, the raising of consciousness among fellow un-closeted individuals and a means of raising awareness in the wider society.

=== In atheism ===
In The God Delusion, anti-religion activist Richard Dawkins uses the term "consciousness raising" for several other things, explicitly describing these as analogous to the feminist case. These include replacing references to children as Catholic, Muslim, etc. with references to children of the adults who are members of these religions (which he compares to our using non-sexist terminology) and Darwin as "raising our consciousness" in biology to the possibility of explaining complexity naturalistically and, in principle, raising our consciousness to the possibility of doing such things elsewhere (especially in physics). Earlier in the book, he uses the term (without explicitly referring to feminism) to refer to making people aware that leaving their parents' faith is an option.

=== Inspiration from Maoism ===
In 1996, Carol Hanisch delivered a speech at the 30th Anniversary Symposium on "China’s Great Proletarian Cultural Revolution" at the New School for Social Research. The speech was titled "Impact of the Chinese Cultural Revolution on the Women's Liberation Movement." Hanisch credited William H. Hinton's book Fanshen as well as the works of Mao Zedong for influencing the emerging women's liberation movement of the 1960s. She cites both Black Liberation and Maoist theory, and in particular Maoist notions of "speaking bitterness" and "self-criticism", for helping to develop the idea of consciousness raising groups within American radical feminism.

== See also ==
- Awareness activism
- Awareness ribbon
- Black Consciousness Movement
- Critical consciousness
- Diffusion of innovations § Process
- Essentialism
- False consciousness
- Identity politics
- Internet activism
- Legal awareness
- Situationist International
- Suicide awareness
- Wokeness

== Bibliography ==
- Brownmiller, Susan (1999). In Our Time: Memoir of a Revolution (ISBN 0-385-31486-8).
- Chicago Women's Liberation Union (1971), How to start your own consciousness-raising group
- Freeman, Jo (1972). "The Tyranny of Structurelessness". Berkeley Journal of Sociology, 17, 151–165.
- Redstockings (1975/1978). Feminist Revolution: an abridged edition with additional writings (ISBN 0-394-73240-5).
- Sarachild, Kathie (1973): Consciousness-Raising: A Radical Weapon. Also reprinted in Feminist Revolution, pp. 144–150.
- Willis, Ellen, "Radical Feminism and Feminist Radicalism", 1984, collected in No More Nice Girls: Countercultural Essays, Wesleyan University Press, 1992, ISBN 0-8195-5250-X, p. 117–150.
