= Kathie Sarachild =

American writer and radical feminist

- Born: Kathie Amatniek; July 1943 (age 83)
- Education: Radcliffe College
- Occupation: Activist
- Years active: 1967-present
- Movement: Radical feminism

Kathie Sarachild (born Kathie Amatniek; July 1943) is an American writer and radical feminist. In 1968, she took the last name "Sarachild" after her mother Sara. Kathie coined the phrase "Sisterhood is Powerful" in a flier she wrote for the keynote speech she gave for New York Radical Women's first public action at the convocation of the Jeannette Rankin Brigade. This was a slogan that would become synonymous with the radical feminist movement in the years which followed.

She was one of four women who held the Women's Liberation banner at the Miss America protest, and had her paper "A Program for Radical Feminist Consciousness-Raising" presented at the First National Women's Liberation Conference outside Chicago on November 27, 1968 (it was later published in Notes from the Second Year in 1970). She was a member of New York Radical Women.

In February 1969, she led a feminist group that was soon to be called Redstockings in their disruption of the New York State Abortion Reform Hearing, at which women first demanded to testify about their own abortions. In March of the same year, Redstockings held the first ever abortion speakout, which became a model for abortion rights activists across the United States. She played a leading part in the consciousness-raising movement in the 1960s and 1970s.

She wrote "Consciousness-Raising: A Radical Weapon", which was presented to the First National Conference of Stewardesses for Women's Rights in 1973 in New York City. She was founding co-editor of Woman's World newspaper in 1971, and the chief editor for and an author for the Redstockings anthology Feminist Revolution, published in 1975. As of 2014, she is director of the Redstockings Women's Liberation Archive for Action. She has four stepchildren.

In 2013, Sarachild, along with Carol Hanisch, Ti-Grace Atkinson and Kathy Scarbrough, initiated "Forbidden Discourse: The Silencing of Feminist Criticism of 'Gender'", as an "open statement from 48 radical feminists from seven countries."
