= Ellen Willis =

American writer (1941–2006)

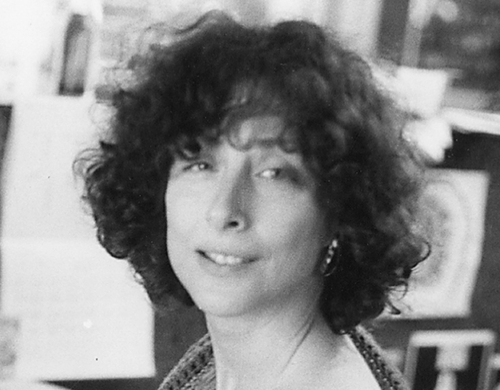
- Ellen Willis at the Village Voice in the late 1970s
- Born: Ellen Jane Willis; December 14, 1941; New York City, New York, U.S.
- Died: November 9, 2006 (aged 64); Queens, New York, U.S.
- Occupation: Journalist
- Spouse: Stanley Aronowitz

Ellen Jane Willis (December 14, 1941 – November 9, 2006) was an American left-wing political essayist, journalist, activist, feminist, and pop music critic. A 2014 collection of her essays, The Essential Ellen Willis, received the National Book Critics Circle Award for Criticism.

== Early life and education ==
Willis was born in Manhattan to a Jewish family, and grew up in the boroughs of the Bronx and Queens in New York City. Her father was a police lieutenant in the New York City Police Department. Willis attended Barnard College as an undergraduate and did graduate study at University of California, Berkeley, where she studied comparative literature.

== Career ==
In the late 1960s and 1970s, she was the first pop music critic for the New Yorker, and later wrote for, among others, the Village Voice, The Nation, Rolling Stone, Slate, and Salon, as well as Dissent, where she was also on the editorial board. She was the author of several books of collected essays.

At the time of her death, she was a professor in the journalism department of New York University and the head of its Center for Cultural Reporting and Criticism.

=== Writing and activism ===
Willis was known for her feminist politics. She was a member of New York Radical Women and subsequently co-founder in early 1969 with Shulamith Firestone of the radical feminist group Redstockings. She was one of the few women working in music criticism during its inaugural years when the field was predominantly male. Starting in 1979, Willis wrote a number of essays that were highly critical of anti-pornography feminism, criticizing it for what she saw as its sexual puritanism and moral authoritarianism, as well as its threat to free speech. These essays were among the earliest expressions of feminist opposition to the anti-pornography movement in what became known as the feminist sex wars. Her 1981 essay, Lust Horizons: Is the Women's Movement Pro-Sex? is the origin of the term, "pro-sex feminism".

She was a strong supporter of women's abortion rights, and in the mid-1970s was a founding member of the pro-choice street theater and protest group No More Nice Girls. A self-described anti-authoritarian democratic socialist, she was very critical of what she viewed as social conservatism and authoritarianism on both the political right and left. In cultural politics, she was equally opposed to the idea that cultural issues are politically unimportant, as well as to strong forms of identity politics and their manifestation as political correctness.

In several essays and interviews written since the September 11 attacks, she cautiously supported humanitarian intervention and, while opposed to the 2003 invasion of Iraq, she criticized certain aspects of the anti-war movement.

Willis wrote a number of essays on anti-Semitism, and was particularly critical of left anti-Semitism. Occasionally she wrote about Judaism itself, penning a particularly notable essay, for Rolling Stone, in 1977, about her brother's spiritual journey as a Baal Teshuva.

She saw political authoritarianism and sexual repression as closely linked, an idea first advanced by psychologist Wilhelm Reich; much of Willis' writing advances a Reichian or radical Freudian analysis of such phenomena. In 2006 she was working on a book on the importance of radical psychoanalytic thought for current social and political issues.

=== Rock criticism ===
Willis was the first popular music critic for the New Yorker, writing between 1968 and 1975. As such, she was one of the first American popular music critics to write for a national audience. She got the job after having published only one article on popular music, "Dylan" in the underground magazine Cheetah, in 1967.

In addition to her "Rock, etc." column in the New Yorker, she also published criticism on popular music in Rolling Stone, the Village Voice, and for liner notes and book anthologies, most notably her essay on the Velvet Underground for the Greil Marcus "desert island disc" anthology Stranded (1979). Her contemporary Richard Goldstein characterized her work as "liberationist" at its heart and said that "Ellen, Emma Goldman, and Abbie Hoffman are part of a lost tradition — radicals of desire."

== Personal life ==
Willis had met her second husband, sociology professor Stanley Aronowitz, in the late 1960s, and they entered a relationship some 10 years later. They shared domestic tasks equally. Willis died of lung cancer on November 9, 2006.

She was survived by her husband and by her daughter, Nona Willis-Aronowitz, who edited the collection Out of the Vinyl Deeps.

== Legacy ==
Willis was a friend of many contemporary critics, including Robert Christgau, Georgia Christgau, Greil Marcus, and Richard Goldstein. Christgau, Joe Levy, Evelyn McDonnell, Joan Morgan, and Ann Powers have all cited her as an influence on their careers and writing styles. At one point, she and Christgau were lovers.

Her papers were deposited in the Arthur and Elizabeth Schlesinger Library on the History of Women in America, in the Radcliffe Institute at Harvard University in 2008.

In 2011, the first collection of Willis's music reviews and essays, Out of the Vinyl Deeps (University of Minnesota Press), was published. Willis "celebrated the seriousness of pleasure and relished the pleasure of thinking seriously," a review in The New York Times said.

On April 30, 2011, a conference at New York University, "Sex, Hope, & Rock 'n' Roll: The Writings of Ellen Willis", celebrated her anthology and pop music criticism.

The Essential Ellen Willis, edited by her daughter, won the 2014 National Book Critics Circle Award in the Criticism category.

Willis is featured in the 2014 feminist history documentary She's Beautiful When She's Angry.

== Bibliography ==
=== Books ===
- Willis, Ellen (1962). Questions freshmen ask : a guide for college girls. New York: Dutton.
- Willis, Ellen (1981). Beginning to See the Light: Pieces of a Decade. New York: Knopf : distributed by Random House. ISBN 0-394-51137-9.
- Willis, Ellen (1992). Beginning to See the Light: Sex, Hope, and Rock-and-Roll. 2d ed. Hanover: Wesleyan. ISBN 0-8195-6255-6.
- Willis, Ellen (1992). No More Nice Girls: Countercultural Essays. Hanover, NH: Published by University Press of New England [for] Wesleyan University Press. ISBN 0-8195-5250-X.
- Willis, Ellen (1999). Don't Think, Smile!: Notes on a Decade of Denial. Beacon Press. ISBN 0-8070-4320-6.
- Willis, Ellen (2011). Out of the Vinyl Deeps: Ellen Willis on Rock Music. University of Minnesota Press. ISBN 978-0-8166-7283-7.
- Willis, Ellen (2014). Willis-Aronowitz, Nona (ed.). The Essential Ellen Willis. University of Minnesota. ISBN 978-0-8166-8121-1.
- Echols, Alice (1989). Daring to Be Bad: Radical Feminism in America 1967-1975. University of Minnesota Press. ISBN 0-8166-1786-4. Willis wrote the foreword.

=== Essays, reporting and other contributions ===
- "Ellen Willis's Reply", 1968.
- "Women and the Myth of Consumerism", Ramparts, 1969.
- "Radical Feminism and Feminist Radicalism", Social Text, Spring-Summer 1984.
- "Hell No, I Won't Go: End the War on Drugs", Village Voice, September 19, 1989.
- "Vote for Ralph Nader!". Salon. November 6, 2000. Archived from the original on September 11, 2006.
- "The Realities of War" (A response to Elaine Scarry's "Citizenship in Emergency"), Boston Review, October/November 2002.
- "The Pernicious Concept of 'Balance'", The Chronicle of Higher Education, September 9, 2005. Note: scroll down page.
- Willis, Ellen (July 27, 2020). "Hearing". The Talk of the Town. February 22, 1969. The New Yorker. Vol. 96, no. 21. pp. 13–14.
