= Patricia Mainardi =

American art historian

Patricia "Pat" Mainardi (born 1942) is an American art historian and a retired professor of Art History and Women's and Gender Studies at the City University of New York.

== Career and activism ==
Pat Mainardi was part of the radical feminist group Redstockings. In 1970, she contributed the essay, "The Politics of Housework," to the anthology Sisterhood is Powerful. It had originally been published by Redstockings earlier that year.

She was a professor of Art History and Women's and Gender Studies at the City University of New York.

Mainardi has also taught at Harvard University, Princeton University and Williams College. In the early 1990s, Mainardi was the first president of the Association of Historians of Nineteenth-Century Art (AHNCA).

She was a member of the Council of Field Editors for the journal caa.reviews from 1998 to 2004.

Her image is included in the 1972 poster Some Living American Women Artists by Mary Beth Edelson.

== Publications ==
- Art and Politics of the Second Empire: The Universal Expositions of 1855 and 1867. Yale University Press, 1987 (College Art Association's Charles Rufus Morey Award, 1987).
- The End of the Salon: Art and the State in the Early Third Republic. Cambridge University Press, 1993.
- Husbands, Wives, and Lovers: Marriage and Its Discontents in Nineteenth Century France. Yale University Press, 2003.
- Pears, Pastimes, and People: Caricatures by Daumier and His Contemporaries. La Maison Française, New York University, 2013.
- Another World: Nineteenth-Century Illustrated Print Culture. Yale University Press, 2017.

== Awards ==
Mainardi received the 1989 Charles Rufus Morey Book Award from the College Art Association for her book Art and Politics of the Second Empire: The Universal Expositions of 1855 and 1867. In 2016, the French government awarded her a knighthood, as a Chevalier dans l’Ordre des Palmes Académiques, citing both her academic scholarship and her feminist activism.
