= Tatiana Mamonova =

Women's rights activist and author

- Татья́на Арсе́ньевна Мамо́нова
- Born: 10 December 1943 (age 82); Saint Petersburg, Soviet Union
- Occupations: Author, poet, journalist, videographer, artist, editor, public lecturer
- Organizations: PEN International; Sisterhood Is Global Institute; Women's Institute for Freedom of the Press
- Known for: Founder of Woman and Russia Almanac
- Notable work: Woman and Russia; Russian Women's Studies; Women's Glasnost vs Naglost

Tatyana Mamonova (born 10 December 1943), is a Russian author, poet, journalist, videographer, artist, editor and public lecturer. Mamonova is the founder and editor of the feminist samizdat and NGO Woman and Russia Almanac, now called Woman and Russia / Woman and Earth.

== Early life ==
Mamonova was born in the Soviet Union, and was raised in Leningrad after World War II.

== Career ==
Mamonova was exiled from the Soviet Union in 1980. Her organization, then called Woman and Russia, was an NGO promoting the human rights of women from the Soviet Union and connecting Russian speaking women's voices and needs with the international community. She edited and published the samizdat Woman and Russia Almanac, now called Woman and Earth Almanac, an art and literary journal containing the first collection of Soviet feminist writings. Prior to her exile from her native St. Petersburg, Russia, she was an organizer and exhibitor in the non-conformist artist movement in Russia and a literary and television journalist with Aurora Publishers (working alongside Josef Brodsky) and Leningrad Television.

In 1987 Mamonova, became an associate of the Women's Institute for Freedom of the Press (WIFP). WIFP is an American nonprofit publishing organization. The organization works to increase communication between women and connect the public with forms of women-based media.

She contributed the piece "It's time we began with ourselves" to the 1984 anthology Sisterhood Is Global: The International Women's Movement Anthology, edited by Robin Morgan.

Since her exile, Mamonova continues to edit and publish Woman and Earth Almanac and two additional Woman and Earth publications: Succes d'estime (since 2001) and Fotoalbum: Around the World (since 2004). She still leads a since-renamed and expanded organization, Woman and Earth Global Eco-Network; she has authored four books in the United States,

She is a former post-doctoral fellow with Harvard University's Bunting Institute, a member of Pen International, and is the Russia representative to the Sisterhood Is Global Institute.

== Books ==
- Femmes et Russie Almanach, (in French) Volumes 1–3, edited by Tatiana Mamonova. Paris: Edition Des Femmes, 1980–1981.
- Zhentschina i Rossia Almanach, (in Russian) Volume 3, edited by Mamonova. Paris: Edition Des Femmes, 1980.
- Voix de Femmes en Russia Almanach, (in French) Volume 4, edited by Mamonova. Paris: Denoel-Gontier, 1982.
- Woman and Russia Almanach, Volume 1, edited by Mamonova. London: Sheba Press, 1980.
- Kvinnen og Russland Almanach, Volume 1, edited by Mamonova. Oslo: Pax Forlag, 1980.
- Kvinnan Ryssland Almanac, Volumes 1 & 2, edited by Mamonova. Stockholm: Awe Gebers, 1980.
- Kvindren og Rusland Almanach, Volumes 1 & 2, edited by Mamonova. Copenhagen: Informations Forlag, 1980.
- Die Frau und Russland Almanach, Volumes 1 & 2, edited by Mamonova. Munich: Frauenoffensive, 1980.
- Die Frau und Russland Almanach, (in German) Volume 3, edited by Mamonova. Basel, Switzerland: Mond, 1982.
- Das Radieschen (children's book), by Mamonova. Vienna: Blagina Verlag, 1981.
- Vrouwen in Sovjet-Rusland Anthology from Volumes 1–3, edited by Mamonova. Amsterdam: Anthos, 1981.
- Woman and Russia Anthology from Volumes 1–3, (in Japanese), edited by Mamonova. Tokyo: Shin-Ichi Masagaki & Miiko Kataoka, 1982.
- Feminism in Russia Almanach, (in Greek), edited by Mamonova. Athens: Images, 1982.
- Woman and Russia Almanac (1979-1991), now called Woman and Earth Almanac (1991–present), edited by Mamonova, New York: Woman and Earth Press.
- Women and Russia, Feminist Writings from the Soviet Union, edited by Mamonova, Boston: Beacon Press, 1984.
- Russian Women's Studies: Essays on Sexism in Soviet Culture, by Mamonova New York: Pergamon Press and Teacher's College Press, 1989, 1990, 1991.
- Women's Glasnost vs Naglost: Stopping Russian Backlash, by Mamonova, with Chandra Niles Folsom. Westport, CT: Greenwood Press 1993.
- Succes d’estime, by Tatyana Mamonova. New York: Woman and Earth Press, 2001–present.
- Fotoalbum: Around the World, by Mamonova. New York: Woman and Earth Press, 2004–present.

== Sources ==
- Aiken, Susan Hardy and Barker, Adele (1993). Dialogues/Dialogi. Duke University Press. ISBN 0-8223-1390-1
- Rule, Wilma and Noonan, Norma (1996). Russian Women in Politics and Society. Greenwood Press. ISBN 0-313-29363-5
