= Fatema Mernissi =

Moroccan feminist writer and sociologist (1940–2015)

- فاطمة المرنيسي
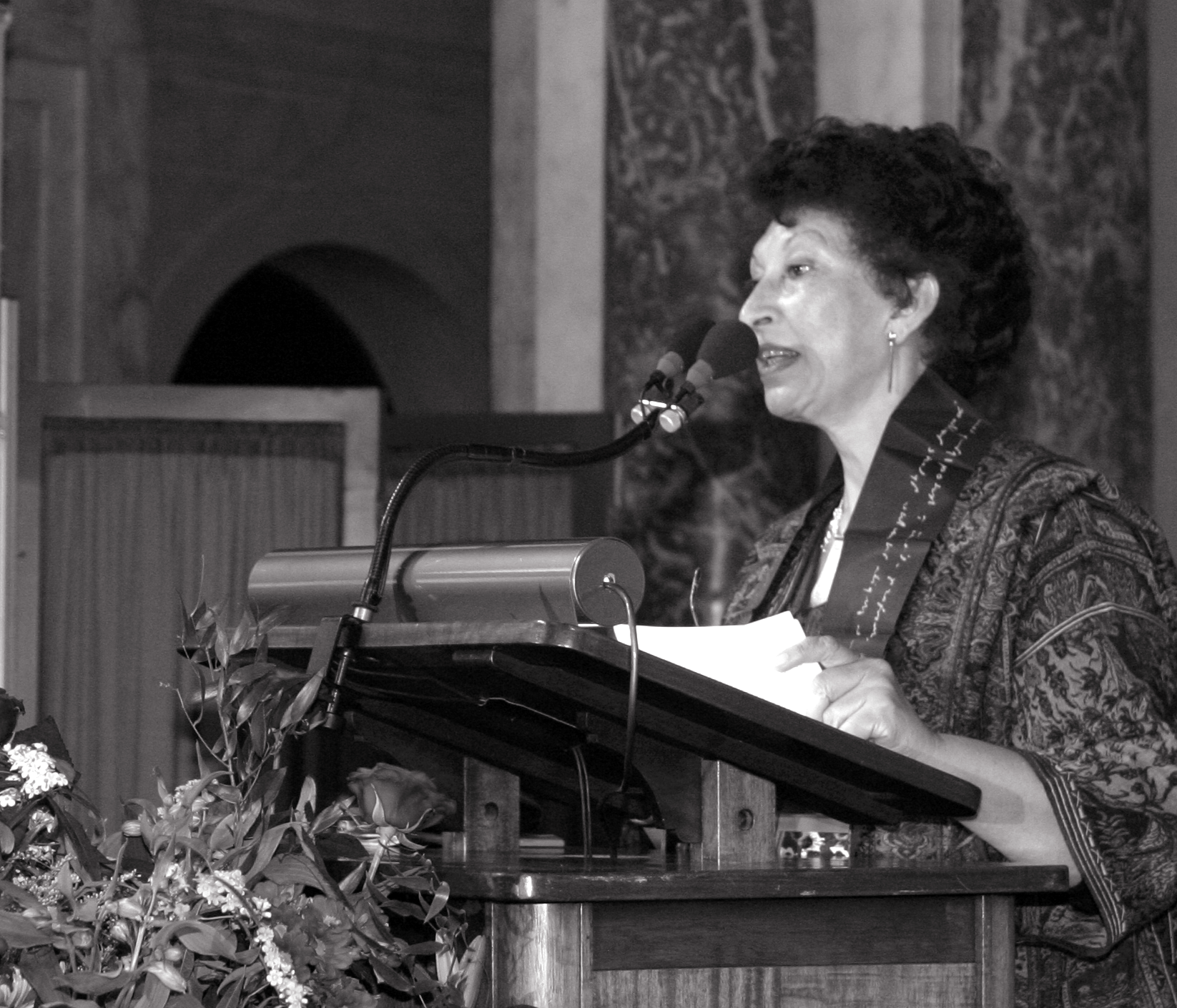
- Mernissi receiving the Erasmus Prize, 2004
- Born: 27 September 1940; Fez, Morocco
- Died: 30 November 2015 (aged 75); Rabat, Morocco
- Education: University of Paris; Brandeis University
- Occupation: Sociologist
- Writing career
- Notable awards: Prince of Asturias Award
- Movement: Feminist
- Website: fatemamernissi.com

Fatema Mernissi (Arabic: فاطمة المرنيسي, romanized: Fāṭima Marnīsī; 27 September 1940 – 30 November 2015) was a Moroccan feminist writer and sociologist.

== Biography ==
Fatema Mernissi was born on 27 September 1940 in Fez, Morocco. She grew up in the harem of her affluent paternal grandmother along with various female kin and servants. She received her primary education in a school established by the nationalist movement, and secondary level education in an all-girls school funded by the French protectorate. She started her studies in political science at Mohammed V University in 1959. She then obtained scholarships to pursue studies in sociology, leading her to the Sorbonne in 1966, then she transferred to Brandeis University in 1970, where she gained her doctorate in 1973.

She returned to work at the Mohammed V University in Rabat and taught at the Faculté des Lettres between 1974 and 1981 on subjects such as methodology, family sociology and psychosociology. Further, she was a research scholar at the University Institute for Scientific Research at the same university.

Mernissi's Beyond the Veil: Male-Female Dynamics in Muslim Society was written for her PhD thesis and later published as a book which recognizes the power of Muslim women in relation to the Islamic faith. Mernissi is known for her sociopolitical approaches towards discussing gender and sexual identities, specifically those in Morocco and other Muslim countries. She is regarded as an influential feminist figure, as she was a renowned public speaker, scholar, teacher, writer, and sociologist. Mernissi died in Rabat on 30 November 2015.

== Publications and their influence ==
Mernissi's first monograph, Beyond the Veil, was published in 1975. A revised edition was published in Britain in 1985 and in the US in 1987. Beyond the Veil has become a classic, especially in the fields of anthropology and sociology, on women in the Arab World, the Mediterranean area or Muslim societies in general.

As an Islamic feminist, Mernissi was largely concerned with Islam and women's roles, analyzing the historical development of Islamic thought and its modern manifestations. Through a detailed investigation of the nature of the succession to Muhammad, she cast doubt on the validity of some of the hadith (sayings and traditions attributed to him), and therefore the subordination of women that she sees in Islam, but not necessarily in the Qur'an.

In 1984, she contributed the text "The merchant's daughter and the son of the sultan" to the anthology Sisterhood Is Global: The International Women's Movement Anthology, edited by Robin Morgan. Her most famous book as an Islamic feminist, The Veil and the Male Elite: A Feminist Interpretation of Women's Rights in Islam, is a quasi-historical study of the role of the wives of Muhammad. It was first published in French in 1987 and translated into English in 1991. The book was subsequently banned in Morocco, Iran, and the Arab states of the Persian Gulf.

As a sociologist, Mernissi mainly undertook field work in Morocco. On several occasions in the late 1970s and early 1980s, she conducted interviews in order to map prevailing attitudes to women and their work. She did sociological research for UNESCO and ILO as well as for the Moroccan government. In the same period, Mernissi contributed articles to periodicals and other publications on women in Morocco and women and Islam from a contemporary as well as from a historical perspective.

Her work has been cited as an inspiration by other Muslim feminists, such as those who founded Musawah and others. For Doing Daily Battle: Interviews with Moroccan Women (1991), she interviewed peasant women, women labourers, clairvoyants and maidservants. In 1994, Mernissi published a fictional memoir, Dreams of Trespass: Tales of a Harem Girlhood (in the US, the book was originally titled The Harem Within: Tales of a Moroccan Girlhood, and is still known by that title in the UK).

A recurring topic in her writings is the fictional character Scheherazade of Arabian Nights. Her article, The Satellite, the Prince, and Scheherazade: The Rise of Women as Communicators in Digital Islam explores cases in which women take part in online media, while Digital Scheherazades in the Arab World covers the topics of online activities shifting cultural ways. In these essays, she mentions how technology is quickly spreading – one of the main sources being the World Wide Web – and analyses the roles and contributions of women in this movement.

She wrote extensively about life within harems, gender, and public and private spheres. Size 6: The Western Women’s Harem, is an essay from her book, Scheherazade Goes West: Different Cultures, Different Harems that discusses the repression and pressures women in different societies face merely based on their physical appearance. Whether she analyzes women in Moroccan society or in the West, she claims that they must live up to stereotypical, culturally imposed standards, such as dress sizes. Mernissi compares the clothing size 6 to harems and states that these Western practices isolate and mistreat women.

=== Ethnocentrism: Beyond the Veil ===
In 1975, Fatima Mernissi's first book, Beyond the Veil, was published, and it was considered revolutionary. Mernissi broke down the ethnocentric stereotypes Western society had developed towards Islam, especially Muslim women. She distinguished Muslim women from the homogenized group of ‘third-world women’ that Western feminism had created. Mernissi also fought to overcome Western assumptions that Muslim women were helpless victims of both their religion and the men of their religion. Western stereotypes ostracized Muslim men who did not fit the white, masculine, hegemonic mold dominating the first world society, developing racist ideas towards a religion that was believed to oppress women.

However, Mernissi pointed out that Muslim women were not victims of their religious practices any more than Western women were victims of the patriarchy; both groups of women were oppressed by specific social institutions within a religion or society created to profit from the marginalization of others. Furthermore, Mernissi explained that Western women were veiled, just as Muslim women were, yet Western veils were much more discreet. She argued that youth and beauty veiled Western women, and once a woman no longer had these, she was hardly recognized by society.

Mernissi broke down the ethnocentric approach Western Feminism had been utilizing and wrote to bring more clarity to the diversity necessary within the global Feminine movement. Mernissi's legacy is revolutionary because she created a space within an initially predominantly Western movement that allowed Muslim women to participate without compromising their religious practices. Mernissi's work highlighted how Western feminism could be detrimental to the empowerment of women around the globe if it lacked an intersectional approach to women's issues.

=== Intersectionality: The Forgotten Queens of Islam ===
In the book The Forgotten Queens of Islam, Fatima Mernissi uses an intersectional approach to understand the positions of women throughout early Islamic history through social and political identities that created modes of discrimination. Her aim was to bring to light the significant contributions that women had made throughout early Islamic history and debunk the misconceptions about the absence of women as political and authoritative figures. She does this by exploring the leadership roles that women were involved in throughout Islamic history and alters the way women are portrayed in historiographies. She claims that women held powerful political positions despite religious titles that were given to men. This is exemplified through the many historical accounts that she provides about fifteen women and the active roles that they played in pre-modern Islam politics.

For instance, the role that female slaves played in leading slave revolts against religious rulers without the use of violence (Mernissi, 1994). Moreover, Mernissi distinguishes between “Political Islam,” the period where radical change occurred and women's roles were disregarded or forgotten, and “Rislala Islam,” where women's lives were transformed (Mernissi, 1994). She was fundamental in contributing to the overall academic literature on women's visibility in Islamic history outside of their traditional roles by highlighting their involvement in politics, religion, and cultural change.

=== Gender Roles: Women’s Rebellion & Islamic Memory ===
In the book Women's Rebellion & Islamic Memory, Fatima Mernissi analyzes the role of women in relation to the world of contemporary Islam. In her work, she explores the idea of sexual identity and gender roles in the Islamic world and helps to redefine the narrative surrounding it. Mernissi discusses some of the most prominent issues to do with the status of Muslim women, such as the masking of women's contribution to the economies of Arab states (Mernissi, 1996). Furthermore, Mernissi delves into different demographic, including education and literacy. She uses this to help explain the importance of these factors not only for the empowerment of women in Islam, but also for their health (Mernissi, 1996).

Furthermore, Mernissi analyzes the role of the state in gender roles as well as the outcome of a state that ultimately supports inequality. She ultimately argues that the freedom from these controlling traditions and expectations of women is the only way for the Arab world to develop. Mernissi's work is extremely influential in Islamic feminism, intersectionality, and global feminism, by focusing on issues surrounding Muslim women in the Arab world. This book, in particular, was able to bring light to specific issues that women deal with in the Islamic world, such as issues of sexual identity and gender roles, and the effects these can have on women's empowerment and health.

=== Islam and Democracy: Fear of the Modern World ===
In her book, Islam and Democracy: Fear of the Modern World, Fatima Mernissi employs a transnational approach to analyse the socio-political context of the Arab-Islamic world shortly after the Gulf war. She debates whether the established fundamentalism dominating the Middle East could ever be compatible with the democratic processes used in Western societies. Mernissi raises questions around the uncertainty Muslims feel towards a form of government that is “unislamic” and may compromise their Islamic way of life, including morals and values, such as modesty. Moreover, she explores issues such as the fear of the Islamic religion, democracy, the United Nations Charter, freedom of thought and individualism (Mernissi, 2002).

For instance, she looked at how fundamentalism controlled what a woman would be able to wear, so a democratic society that freed women to dress as they pleased could appear threatening to a hyper-masculine culture. She contests that a living democracy should allow for the legal and constitutional ability to disagree with the state. Mernissi then suggests ways in which progressive Muslims, including feminists, who choose to advocate for democracy and resist fundamentalism should draw from the same sacred texts as those who seek to oppress them, in order to prove that Islam is not fundamentally against women.

== Awards and legacy ==
Mernissi's works focus on providing a voice for oppressed and marginalized women. She brings to light the contributions of women to the economy and acknowledges the roles that affect how females are viewed within Islamic cultures. Throughout her career, Mernissi was an avid spokesperson regarding women's rights and equality, while also embracing the Islamic faith. She uses historical religious research to make claims for her modern feminist stances.

In 2003, Mernissi was awarded the Prince of Asturias Award, along with Susan Sontag. Mernissi's acceptance speech, The Cowboy or Sinbad?, covered the topic of globalization, and was recognized for her pensive take, considering both the issue and effects of culture. In 2004, she was awarded the Erasmus Prize, alongside Sadik Al-Asm and Abdolkarim Soroush. For this award, she was recognized for her sociocultural impact, since it was dedicated to "Religion and Modernity". In 2017, The Middle East Studies Association created the Fatema Mernissi Book Award to "recognize outstanding scholarship in studies of gender, sexuality, and women’s lived experience".

Mernissi's legacy can be greatly attributed to her scholarly and literary contributions to the early Islamic feminist movement. Mernissi tackled issues such as Eurocentrism, intersectionality, transnationalism and global feminism in her publications and public lectures. The New York Times quoted her in an obituary:

"Not only have the sacred texts always been manipulated, but manipulation of them is a structural characteristic of the practice of power in Muslim societies.” (The Veil and the Male Elite: A Feminist Interpretation of Women’s Rights in Islam)

== Bibliography ==
- 1975: Beyond the Veil: Male-Female Dynamics in a Muslim Society. revised ed. 1985, 1987, reprinted London: Saqi Books. ISBN 0-86356-412-7
- 1982: Sabbah, Fatna Aït (1986). La femme dans l'inconscient musulman (in French). Fatna Aït Sabbah is a pseudonym. Albin Michel. ISBN 9782226028297.
- 1983: Le Maroc raconté par ses femmes.
- 1984: L’amour dans les pays musulmans
- 1985: Femmes du Gharb
- 1987: Le harem politique – Le Prophète et les femmes (trans. by Mary Jo Lakeland,1991: The Veil and the Male Elite: A Feminist Interpretation of Women's Rights in Islam. New York: Basic Books. ISBN 978-0201-63221-7)
- 1988: Shahrazad n’est pas marocaine
- 1990: Sultanes oubliées – Femmes chefs d’Etat en Islam (trans. 1993: Forgotten Queens of Islam)
- 1992: La Peur-Modernité
- 1993: Women’s Rebellion and Islamic Memory
- 1994: The Harem Within (retitled. 1995: Dreams of Trespass – Tales of a Harem Girlhood New York: Perseus Books. ISBN 0-201-48937-6)
- 1997: Les Aït-Débrouille
- 1998: Etes-vous vacciné contre le Harem?
- 2001: Scheherazade Goes West. New York: Washington Square Press. ISBN 0-7434-1243-5
- 2002: Islam and Democracy: Fear of the Modern World. New York: Basic Books. ISBN 0-7382-0745-4
- 2009: Les Femmes Du Maroc. Brooklyn: PowerHouse Books. ISBN 1-57687-491-5

=== Edited by Mernissi ===
- 1989: Doing Daily Battle: Interviews with Moroccan Women, translated by Mary Jo Lakeland. New Brunswick: Rutgers University Press.

== See also ==
- Islamic feminism
- Liberal movements within Islam
- Mohamed Guessous
