= Marjorie Agosín =

Chilean-American writer (1955–2025)

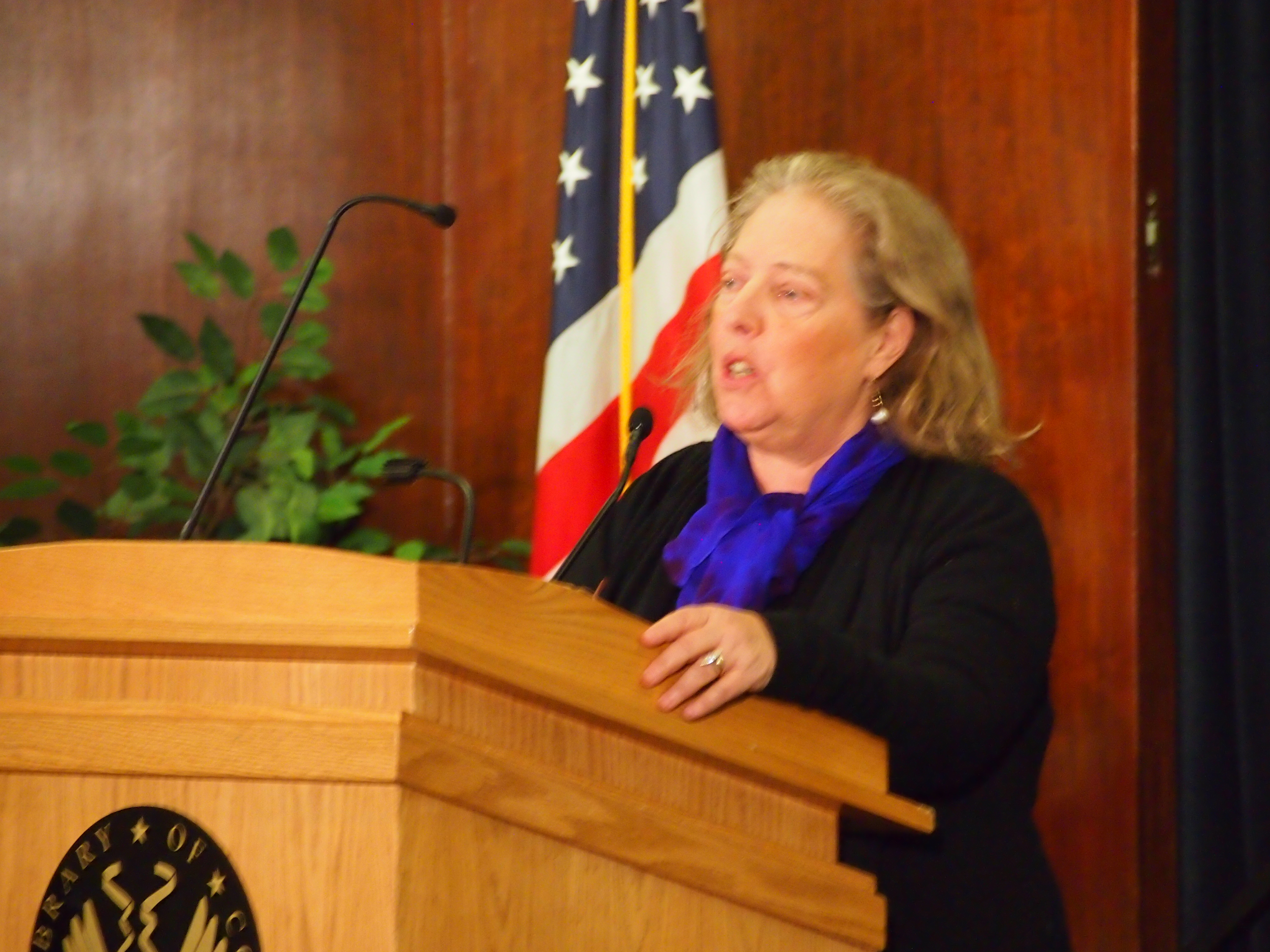
- Born: June 15, 1955; Bethesda, Maryland, U.S.
- Died: 10 March 2025 (aged 69); Wellesley, Massachusetts, U.S.
- Education: Indiana University Bloomington (PhD)
- Occupation: Writer
- Writing career
- Language: Spanish, English
- Genres: Poetry, essay
- Notable awards: Gabriela Mistral Medal; Belpré Medal; Peabody Award

Marjorie Agosín (June 15, 1955 – March 10, 2025) was a Chilean-American writer. She won notability for her outspokenness for women's rights in Chile. The United Nations honored her for her work on human rights. The Chilean government awarded her with the Gabriela Mistral Medal of Honor for Life Achievement in 2000. She has been a recipient of the Belpré Medal. In the United States, she received the Letras de Oro, the Latino Literary Prize, and the Peabody Award, together with the United Nations Leadership Award in Human Rights.

== Early life and education ==
Agosín was born in 1955 to Jewish Chilean parents, Moisés and Frida Agosín, in Bethesda, Maryland, where her father Moisés was completing graduate studies. At the age of three months her family returned with her to Chile, growing up in Santiago and at the family's summer house in El Quisco where the poet Pablo Neruda was an occasional guest. While she was raised to appreciate her Jewish heritage, her family also appreciated the dominant Catholic culture of Chile. Her aunt even organized Easter Egg hunts for her and her mother adored the beauty of the Catholic churches in Chile. Agosín attended the Hebrew School in Santiago, Chile. In 1970 she left with her family to live in the United States, where her father became a professor of chemistry in Athens, Georgia; after the Chilean coup d'état of September 11, 1973, the move became permanent.

== Career ==
Agosín studied in Georgia, and later attended Indiana University Bloomington, where she obtained her PhD in Latin American Literature.

After receiving her degree, her first job was as an assistant professor at Wellesley College, the same Massachusetts women's college at which, at the age of thirty-seven, she became one of the youngest women ever to obtain the rank of full professor in the history of the institution, and at which, after more than twenty years, she continued teaching.

She edited the anthology These Are Not Sweet Girls: Poetry by Latin American Women (White Pine Press, 1991), featuring newly translated poems by Gabriela Mistral, Rosario Castellanos, Giannina Braschi, Olga Nolla, Julia de Burgos, Violeta Parra, Cristina Peri Rossi, and other Latina poets.

Agosín began to write poetry in Spanish when she was ten years old, and although she spoke both English and Yiddish, she wrote her extensive work in Spanish.

Agosín has been a prolific author: her published books, including those she has written as well as those she has edited, number over eighty. She has published several books of fiction, among them two collections of short stories: La Felicidad (1991) and Las Alfarenas (1994). Agosín's series of memoirs began with a book about her mother's life in the south of Chile, A Cross and a Star: Memoirs of a Jewish Girl in Chile (1995). The later two volumes related the story of her father's life, Always from Somewhere Else (1998), and Agosín's own story, The Alphabet in My Hands (2000).

In each of these books, the prevailing theme is that of the Jewish immigrant who is trying to find a place in Latin American society. She contributed the piece "Women of smoke" to the 1984 anthology Sisterhood Is Global: The International Women's Movement Anthology, edited by Robin Morgan. Her two most recent books are both poetry collections, The Light of Desire / La Luz del Deseo, translated by Lori Marie Carlson (Swan Isle Press, 2009), and Secrets in the Sand: The Young Women of Juárez, translated by Celeste Kostopulos-Cooperman (White Pine Press, 2006), about the female homicides in Ciudad Juárez. She taught Spanish language and Latin American literature at Wellesley College.

Agosín died on March 10, 2025, at her home in Wellesley, Massachusetts.

== Selected published works ==
- Conchali, (Senda Nueva de Ediciones, 1980), ISSN 0145-8973
- Brujas Y Algo Más: Witches and Other Things, (Latin American Literary Review Press, 1984), ISBN 978-0-935480-16-0
- Violeta Parra: santa de pura greda : un estudio de su obra poética, (with Inés Dölz-Blackburn), (Planeta, 1988), ISBN 9562470164
- La Felicidad (Editorial Cuarto Propio, 1991) ISBN 9781877727344
- Sargazo (White Pine Press, 1993) ISBN 978-1-877727-27-6
- La Alfareras (Editorial Cuarto Propio, 1994) ISBN 9789562600637
- Tapestries of hope, threads of love, (University of New Mexico Press, 1996) ISBN 0-8263-1692-1
- A Woman's Gaze: Latin American Women Artists (White Pine Press, 1998) ISBN 1-877727-85-7
- The Alphabet in My Hands: A Writing Life, translated by Nancy Abraham Hall (Rutgers University Press, 2000)
- Always from Somewhere Else: A Memoir of My Chilean Jewish Father, (Editor), (Feminist Press, 2000), ISBN 1-55861-256-4
- Women, gender, and human rights: a global perspective, (Rutgers University Press, 2001), ISBN 0-8135-2983-2
- Secrets in the Sand: The Young Women of Juárez (White Pine Press, 2006), ISBN 1-893996-47-6
- The Light of Desire / La Luz del Deseo, translated by Lori Marie Carlson (Swan Isle Press, 2010), ISBN 978-0-9748881-7-0
- I Lived on Butterfly Hill, (Atheneum Books for Young Readers, an imprint of Simon & Schuster, 2014) ISBN 978-1-4169-5344-9
