= Rada Iveković =

Croatian philosopher and writer

- Born: 1945 (age 80–81); Zagreb, Yugoslavia

Philosophical work
- Era: 20th-century philosophy
- School: Buddhist philosophy, feminist philosophy
- Main interests: Political philosophy, feminist philosophy
- Notable ideas: "Le partage de la raison"

Rada Iveković (born 1945 in Zagreb, Yugoslavia) is a Croatian professor, philosopher, Indologist and writer.

== Research ==
Iveković's research interests include comparative philosophy (Asian philosophy, particularly Indian, and Western), feminist theory and feminist philosophy as well as political philosophy.

In particular, the following aspects have been of intellectual inspiration for Iveković's work: contemporary European philosophy, postmodern philosophy, Orientalism in (Western) philosophy, the feminine in philosophy, issues of nation, state und citizenship, problems of nationalism, of violence and war, European identity issues, and democracy.

Iveković's other interests include: literary theory and literary criticism, religion and mythology, gender studies and women writers, anthropology, and contemporary French philosophy in particular.

== Political positioning ==
Iveković holds that the inequality of the sexes (Inégalité des sexes) and other alterities, inequalities, exclusions, subordinating inclusions (e.g. through discrimination by gender, national citizenship, ethnicity, colonization) leads to a fatal partitioning of reason ("Le partage de la raison"). On the war events on the territory of Yugoslavia she takes an explicitly anti-patriarchal, anti-racist and non-nationalist stance.

In 1992, Iveković was among five Croatian feminist intellectuals — alongside Slavenka Drakulić, Dubravka Ugrešić, Vesna Kesić, and Jelena Lovrić — targeted by a coordinated nationalist media campaign in the Croatian press, branded collectively as "Vještice iz Ria" (Witches from Rio) for their anti-nationalist positions during the Yugoslav Wars.

In 1997 Iveković published a study on gender/sex in philosophy, taking issue with Jean-François Lyotard.

In 2017, Iveković has signed the Declaration on the Common Language of the Croats, Serbs, Bosniaks and Montenegrins.

== Career ==
Iveković grew up mostly in Zagreb and Belgrade, living in Zagreb, from 1963 until leaving Croatia for exile in 1991–1992 in a self-described "protest against nationalism."

At Zagreb University, she studied Indology, Philosophy and English Studies (1969) and from 1970 to 1973, Buddhist philosophy at Delhi University where she received her PhD in 1972.

From 1975 to 1991–1992, Iveković was a lecturer in the History of Asian Philosophy and Comparative Philosophy at Zagreb University. From 1998 to 2003 she was a professor at Paris VIII. Since 2003 Professor in the Department of Sociology at University Jean Monnet - St. Etienne and after 2004, the Program Director at Collège international de philosophie (Paris).

== Selected works in English ==
- 1984: She and Slavenka Drakulić-Illić contributed the piece "Neofeminism, and its six mortal sins" to the 1984 anthology Sisterhood Is Global: The International Women's Movement Anthology, edited by Robin Morgan.
- 2004: "COMMENTARY - The Veil in France: Secularism, Nation, Women". Economic and Political Weekly. Vol. 39, 11, 1117–1119.
- 2005: "Borders and Partitions: Exception as Space and Time" (Abstract for the conference Polemos, Stasis ... War, Civil War, 24–27 June 2005, National Chiao Tung University, Taiwan: Center for Humanities and Social Theory).
- 2005: "The Fiction of Gender Constructing the Fiction of Nation: On How Fictions Are Normative, and Norms Produce Exceptions". Anthropological Yearbook of European Cultures 2005 (Gender and Nation in South Eastern Europe), 19–38.

== Sources ==
- Most comprehensive CV, until 2004, in English
- Short portrait in German with photo, 1997
