= Sisterhood Is Global =

1984 anthology of feminist writings

Sisterhood Is Global: The International Women's Movement Anthology
- Cover of the first edition
- Editor: Robin Morgan
- Language: English
- Subject: Second-wave feminism
- Publication date: 1984
- Publication place: United States
- Media type: Print (hardcover and paperback)
- Pages: 815
- ISBN: 9780385177979
- Preceded by: Sisterhood Is Powerful: An Anthology of Writings from the Women's Liberation Movement (1970)
- Followed by: Sisterhood Is Forever: The Women's Anthology for a New Millennium (2003)

Sisterhood Is Global: The International Women's Movement Anthology is a 1984 anthology of feminist writings edited by Robin Morgan, published by Anchor Press/Doubleday. It is the follow-up to Sisterhood Is Powerful: An Anthology of Writings from the Women's Liberation Movement (1970). After Sisterhood Is Global came its follow-up, Sisterhood Is Forever: The Women's Anthology for a New Millennium (2003).

== Background ==
Robin Morgan was awarded Ford Foundation Grants in 1982, 1983, and 1984 to help fund work on Sisterhood Is Global.

== Contents ==
Made up of short essays by women who represent more than 80 countries, Sisterhood Is Global "was hailed as 'an historic publishing event,' 'an instant classic,' and 'the definitive text on the international women's movement,' and adopted widely as a course text in women's studies, international affairs, global economics, and several other disciplines", as Morgan has acknowledged.

Table of Contents
Country etc.	Title	Author(s)
Afghanistan	The Silent Victims	Sima Wali
Algeria	The Day-to-Day Struggle	Fatma Oussedik
Argentina	The Fire Cannot Be Extinguished	Leonor Calvera
Australia	Women in a Warrior Society	Sara Dowse, Patricia Giles
Austria	Benevolent Despotism Versus the Contemporary Feminist Movement	Cheryl Benard, Edit Schlaffer
Brazil	A Fertile but Ambiguous Feminist Terrain	Danda Prado
Britain	The Politics of Survival	Amanda Sebestyen
Canada	The Empowerment of Women	Greta Hofmann Nemiroff
Caribbean	The Dutch-Speaking Caribbean Islands: Fighting Until the End	Sonia M. Cuales
Caribbean	The English-Speaking Caribbean: A Journey in the Making	Peggy Antrobus, Lorna Gordon
Caribbean	The French-Speaking Caribbean: Haiti - A Vacation Paradise of Hell	Cacos La Gonaive
Caribbean	The Spanish-Speaking Caribbean: We Women Aren't Sheep	Magaly Pineda
Chile	Women of Smoke	Marjorie Agosin
China	Feudal Attitudes, Party Control, and Half the Sky	Xiao Lu
Colombia	Fighting for the Right to Fight	Luz Helena Sanchez
Cuba	Paradise Gained, Paradise Lost - The Price of "Integration"	La Silenciada
Denmark	Letter from a Troubled Copenhagen Redstocking	Tinne Vammen
Ecuador	Needed - A Revolution in Attitude	Carola Borja
Egypt	When a Woman Rebels	Nawal El Saadawi
El Salvador	"We Cannot Wait ..."	Collective statement by the Association of Salvadorian Women
Finland	The Right to Be Oneself	Hilkka Pietila
France	Feminism - Alive, Well, and in Constant Danger	Simone de Beauvoir
Germany (East)	Witch Vilmma's Invention of Speech-Swallowing (A Parable)	Irmtraud Morgner
Germany (West)	Fragmented Selves (A Collage)	Renate Berger, Ingrid Kolb, Marielouise Janssen-Jurreit
Ghana	To Be a Woman	Ama Ata Aidoo
Greece	A Village Sisterhood	Margaret Papandreou
Guatemala	Our Daily Bread	Stella Quan
Hungary	The Nonexistence of "Women's Emancipation"	Suzanne Körösi
India	A Condition Across Caste and Class	Devaki Jain
Indonesia	Multiple Roles and Double Burdens	Titi Sumbung
Iran	A Future in the Past - The "Prerevolutionary" Women's Movement	Mahnaz Afkhami
Ireland(s)	Coping with the Womb and the Border	Nell McCafferty
Israel	Up the Down Escalator	Shulamit Aloni
Italy	A Mortified Thirst for Living	Paola Zaccaria
Japan	The Sun and the Shadow	Keiko Higuchi
Kenya	Not Just Literacy, but Wisdom	Rose Adhiambo Arungu-Olende
Korea (South)	A Grandmother's Vision	Soon Chan Park
Kuwait	God's Will - and the Process of Socialization	Noura Al-Falah
Lebanon	The Harem Window	Rose Ghurayyib
Libya	The Wave of Consciousness Cannot Be Reversed	Farida Allaghi
Mexico	Pioneers and Promoters of Women	Carmen Lugo
Morocco	The Merchant's Daughter and the Son of the Sultan	Fatima Mernissi
Nepal	Women as a Caste	Manjula Giri
The Netherlands	In the Unions, the Parties, the Streets, and the Bedrooms	Corrine Oudijk
New Zealand	Foreigners in Our Own Land	Ngahuia Te Awekotuku, Marilyn Waring
Nicaragua	To My Companeras on the Planet Earth	Maria Lourdes Centeno de Zelaya
Nigeria	Not Spinning on the Axis of Maleness	'Molara Ogundipe-Leslie
Norway	More Power to Women!	Berit Ås
The Pacific Islands	All It Requires Is Ourselves	Vanessa Griffen
Pakistan	Women - A Fractured Profile	Miriam Habib
Palestine	Women and the Revolution	Fawzia Fawzia
Peru	"Not Even with a Rose Petal ..."	Ana Maria Portugal
Poland	"Let's Pull Down the Bastilles Before They Are Built"	Anna Titkow
Portugal	Daring to Be Different	Maria de Lourdes Pintasilgo
Rumania	The "Right" to Be Persecuted	Elena Chiriac
Saudi Arabia	An Emerging Social Force	Aisha al-Mana
Senegal	Elegance Amid the Phallocracy	Marie-Angélique Savané
South Africa	Going Up the Mountain	Motlalepula Chabaku
South Africa	South Africa: A Bulletin from Within	Anonymous white South African feminists
Spain	Women Are the Conscience of Our Country	Lidia Falcón
Sri Lanka	The Voice of Women	Hema Goonatilake
Sudan	Women's Studies - and a New Village Stove	Amna Elsadik Badri
Sweden	Similarity, Singularity, and Sisterhood	Rita Liljeström
Thailand	We Superwomen Must Allow the Men to Grow Up	Mallica Vajrathon
The USSR	It's Time We Began with Ourselves	Tatyana Mamonova
The United Nations	"Good Grief, There Are Women Here!"	Claire de Hedervary
The United States	Honoring the Vision of "Changing Woman"	Rayna Green
Venezuela	For As Long As It Takes	Giovanna Merola R.
Vietnam	"The Braided Army"	Nguyen Thi Dinh
Yugoslavia	Neofeminism - and Its "Six Mortal Sins"	Rada Iveković, Slavenka Drakulić

== Editions ==
- 1984, New York: Anchor Press/Doubleday
- 1985, London: Penguin Books
- 1996, Feminist Press at The City University of New York, ISBN 978-1558611603

== In popular culture ==
In a 2019 Paris Fashion Week show, Christian Dior's creative director Maria Grazia Chiuri debuted a collection of T-shirts that read Sisterhood Is Powerful, Sisterhood Is Global, and Sisterhood Is Forever, respectively.
