= Motlalepula Chabaku =

Mama Motlalepula Chabaku was a senior member of the community and a well-known activist, mother of the nation and humanitarian. She was one of the members who served under the leadership of Lillian Ngoyi who led a 20,000 strong 1956 Women's March to the Union buildings in Pretoria, to protest apartheid era pass laws. Mama Chabaku served in two South African regional parliaments in Gauteng and the Free State of South Africa; she had a reputation which preceded her in the community and around the world. She was known by many for her strength, her strong sense of community and her compassion. She contributed the piece "Going up the mountain" to the 1984 anthology Sisterhood Is Global: The International Women's Movement Anthology, edited by Robin Morgan. Her greatest passions in her golden years were nature and the healing powers of natural remedies. She was also an urban horticulturalist, and she spent most of her time educating the community of Soweto, South Africa about greening and natural remedies. She died on 11 May 2012 at her home in Rockville in Soweto.

== Educational background ==
Mama Motlalepula Chabaku has attended the following educational institutions:

- Willberforce Training Institute — Evaton South Africa where she received a Higher Primary Teachers Certificate between 1952 and 1953
- Rose Bruford College of Speech and Drama — Kent United Kingdom she completed a Diploma and an Associate Membership to the Drama Board of Great Britain in 1963
- Lancaster Theological Seminary — Pennsylvania USA where she completed a Master of Divinity Degree in 1979
- Elizabethtown College — Elizabethtown Pennsylvania USA where she completed a Bachelor of Liberal Studies Degree in 1981
- North Carolina A and T State University — Greensboro North Carolina USA where she completed a Master's of Science Degree in Adult Education in 1984
- North Carolina A and T State University — Greensboro North Carolina USA where she completed a Master of Science Degree in Guidance and Counselling majoring in Agency Counselling in 1985
- General Board of Discipleship United Methodist Church — Nashville Tennessee USA where she completed one year's special study on African Spirituality in 1991

== Work experience ==
- St. Cyprians Anglican School – Sophiatown South Africa 1953–1955
- Christ the King School Sophiatown South Africa 1955–1957
- Thusang Community School – White City Jabavu Soweto South Africa 1960–1962
- City Council of Johannesburg, Non-European Affairs Department, Youth Service Section – Johannesburg South Africa 1963–1974
- The Christian Institute of South Africa – South Africa 1974–1976
- USA Mission Interpreter for the United Presbyterian Church – Raleigh North Carolina USA September 1979 – June 1980
- Assistant Minister at Concord Presbyterian Church – Wilmington Delaware USA December – July 1981
- Instructor, International scholar and Advisor in Residence at Bennett College – Greensboro North Carolina USA September 1991- August 1993
- Served as Church and Community Worker at Raleigh Board of Missions and Church Extension of the United Methodist – Raleigh North Carolina USA 1994
- United Methodist Minister for three churches – Randolph Country North Carolina USA June 1985 –June 1988
- United Methodist Minister for three churches – Catawba Country North Carolina USA June 1988 – June 1991
- Methodist Minister of five Methodist Churches under the Vanguard Mission of the Methodist Church – Heidadal Circuit Bloemfontein South Africa January 1993 – May 1994
- Speaker in Orange Free State Parliament – Bloemfontein South Africa May 1994 – January 1998
- Full-time member of Free State Legislature – Bloemfontein South Africa May 1994 – April 1999
- Member of the National Council of Provinces at the National Parliament Cape Town as a permanent delegate for the Free State Province –
- Bloemfontein South Africa March 2000 – April 2004
- Member of the Gauteng Legislature since April 2004 – April 2009

== Positions in South Africa ==
- Provincial Executive Member of the Family Planning Association of South Africa
- National President of Voice of Women (VOW) a multi-racial women's organisation
- Programme Consultant, Southern African Association Youth Clubs
- Founder Member of Black Women's Federation of South Africa and Member of the Resource Panel
- School Teacher, Social Worker, Chairperson of International Women's Year Committee for South Africa, Executive Member of the Moroka School and Molapo Secondary School Boards, Resource person and Community Worker of the Christian Institute of South Africa until 30 June 1976
- Lifeline for Crisis Counselling, Advisor to the Women's Association of African Independent Churches (WAAIC)

== Memberships ==
- Founder Member, Black Women's Federation of South Africa and Member of its Resource Panel
- Senior member of the African National Congress (ANC) since 2 February 1949
- Anglican Church of the Province in South Africa
- Senior Member of the Methodist Church of South Africa
- Member of the National Council of African Women
- Past Committee Member, General Purpose Committee of the Institute of Race Relations
- Institute of Race Relations
- Association Member Drama Board of Great Britain (Lifetime)
- Young Women's Christian Association (YWCA) – Phahameng Bloemfontein South Africa
- South African Black Social Workers Association (SABSWA)
- SANTA Care Group Mangaung Bloemfontein South Africa
- South African Red Cross
- KONTAK – Multicultural Women's Organisation for better human relationships.

== Travel ==
- Travelled throughout the provinces of South Africa, Namibia, Lesotho, Botswana, Mozambique, Zimbabwe and Kenya.
- Travelled extensively within USA, speaking, preaching, teaching and conducting workshops on Human Relations and attended Conferences in 29 countries in Europe, Caribbean, South America, Canada and Africa.
- In January 1987, travelled to Oslo Norway to speak on "Human Rights" in South Africa. Travelled to Israel, Jordan, Canada, Syria, Brazil, Bermuda, Japan and Cuba.
- September 1994 travelled to Bern's Switzerland to attend the First International Conference of Women Presiders of Government Legislatures.
- September 1995 attended the Second International Conference of Women Presiders of Government Legislatures in Tokyo, Japan.

== United Nations International Conferences attendance ==
- United Nations Institute for Training and Research in Norway in 1980 on "Women in Changing Societies"
- United Nations Mid-decade for Women and Women's Conferences in the Mid-decade for Women 1975–1980 Copenhagen Denmark.

== Awards and citations ==
- At the Bloemfontein Annual Springs Business Breakfast was unanimously elected as Individual of the Year "in 1995.
- On 27 March 1996 was awarded the coveted Afrikaans Language Cultural Association – Ladies Award.
- On 17 April 1996 was unanimously voted as Bloemfontein Citizen of the Year".
