= Equality Now =

Non-governmental organization

- Formation: 1992; 34 years ago
- Founders: Jessica Neuwirth; Navi Pillay; Feryal Gharahi
- Global Executive Director: S. Mona Sinha
- Website: equalitynow.org

Equality Now is a non-governmental organization founded in 1992 to advocate for the protection and promotion of the human rights of women and girls. Equality Now works through public policy channels to advance the rights of women and girls. Through a combination of regional partnerships, community mobilization and legal advocacy, the organization encourages governments to adopt, improve and enforce laws that protect and promote women and girls' rights around the world.

Equality Now's four main issue areas are ending sexual violence; ending harmful practices such as child marriage and female genital mutilation; ending sexual exploitation, including the trafficking of women and girls; and ending discrimination in law, including the passage of the Equal Rights Amendment (ERA) in the United States.

As of 2019, the organization has offices in New York City, U.S., Nairobi, Kenya, Manchester, UK, and Beirut, Lebanon.

Gloria Steinem served as the chair emeritus of the board until her death in 2026.

== Background and history ==
Equality Now was founded in 1992 in New York by human rights lawyers Jessica Neuwirth of the United States, Navi Pillay of South Africa, and Feryal Gharahi. The founders believed that acts of violence against women were violations of the fundamental human rights guarantees as stated in the 1948 Universal Declaration of Human Rights and that the human rights movement to that point had neglected women's rights, dismissing these violations as "cultural" or "private."

Equality Now sought to raise public awareness of women's rights as human rights and to channel concern into strategic action through the Women's Action Network, an alliance of organizations with common goals. Supporters who joined the network received campaign briefings and were urged to act against human rights violations against women and girls by writing letters of protest directly to government officials, sharing information about these violations within their communities and taking other steps to support efforts to end violence and discrimination against women.

Equality Now opened its Africa Regional Office in Nairobi, Kenya, in 2000. A London office followed in 2004, and the organization opened its fourth office in Beirut in 2019. The organization also has outposts in Amman, Jordan, Tbilisi, Georgia, Delhi, India, and Washington, D.C..

In 2011, Yasmeen Hassan, author of the first study on domestic violence in Pakistan, became global executive director of Equality Now.

In 2022, S. Mona Sinha was appointed global executive director of Equality Now, succeeding Hassan, who had held the position for over a decade.

== Areas of work ==
Equality Now works to achieve its mission of ending violence and discrimination against women and girls around the world across four broad areas.

=== Sexual violence ===
Sexual violence is perpetrated around the world on girls and women of all ages and all backgrounds. Systemic and structural inequality leaves women and girls particularly vulnerable to sexual violence. Many countries have discriminatory laws around sexual violence, including:

- A legal provision in Bolivia which imposes lesser penalties for perpetrators whose victims are between 14- and 18-years-old
- 'Marry-your-rapist' laws which exempt a rapist from punishment if they marry their victim, for example in Iraq
- Marital rape exemptions leaving women with no access to justice if they are raped by their husband, for example in India

Equality Now works to end such violence by advocating for strong laws and practices in line with international standards, including non-discriminatory implementation, as well as legal systems that support survivors and prevent re-victimisation.

=== Harmful practices ===
Harmful practices encompass a range of violent acts or instances of ritual discrimination that are primarily committed against women and girls and have become culturally normalized. Among the harmful practices Equality Now works to end are:

==== Child marriage ====
Child marriage is defined as a formal marriage or informal union before the age of 18 and disproportionately affects girls around the world. Every year 12 million girls are married before the age of 18. Equality Now describes child marriage as a human rights violation that legitimizes abuse and denies girls' autonomy under the guise of culture, honor, tradition and religion. According to the organization, girls who are forced to marry are subject to state-sanctioned rape and are at risk of increased domestic violence, forced pregnancy and negative health consequences while being denied education and economic opportunity.

==== Female genital mutilation (FGM) ====
It is estimated that more than 200 million girls and women around the world have undergone genital mutilation. At least two million girls are at risk every year. The cutting, which is generally done without anesthetic, may have lifelong health consequences including chronic infection, severe pain during urination, menstruation, sexual intercourse, and childbirth, and psychological trauma. Some girls die from the cutting, usually as a result of bleeding or infection.

In November 2013, a coalition of Royal Colleges, trade unions and Equality Now launched a report at the House of Commons titled "Tackling FGM in the UK: Intercollegiate recommendations for identifying, recording and reporting".

In 2019, Equality Now joined with other organisations working to end FGM at the Women Deliver conference to launch the Global Platform to End FGM/C.

In 2020, Equality Now, in partnership with the U.S. End FGM/C Network and the End FGM European Network, released Female Genital Mutilation/Cutting: A Call For A Global Response, a report calling for global action to end FGM/C by 2030 in line with the Sustainable Development Goals.

Equality Now also sits on the steering committee of the U.S. End FGM/C Network.

=== Sexual exploitation ===
Sexual exploitation is the abuse or attempted abuse of another person’s vulnerability, or of one's own position of power or trust, for sexual purposes. The perpetrator may benefit from the exploitation of the other person through making money, political or social gains, or in other ways. Sexual exploitation occurs on a continuum that includes many forms of coercion and predatory actions, including trafficking for the purpose of sexual exploitation.

International human rights law protects a person’s right to be free from exploitation. These treaties and standards include:

- Convention on the Elimination of All Forms of Discrimination Against Women (CEDAW)
- the Convention on the Rights of the Child (CRC)
- the Protocol to Prevent, Suppress and Punish Trafficking in Persons, Especially Women and Children (Palermo Protocol)
- the Convention for the Suppression of the Traffic in Persons and of the Exploitation of the Prostitution of Others
- the Sustainable Development Goals (SDGs)
- the Beijing Platform for Action

=== Discrimination in law ===
Equality Now works on civil and political rights and on economic, social and cultural rights as part of its goal of reforming discriminatory laws and practices and bringing justice and equality to women and girls. The organization leads and participates in a range of activities and campaigns that aim to hold governments accountable to the pledges they have made to protect the fundamental rights of women and girls around the world.

Since 1999, Equality Now has released its Words and Deeds report every five years, highlighting a selection of the sex- discriminatory laws still in place around the world. Its 2020 report was released in March of that year.

Equality Now has criticized the Donald Trump administration military trans exclusion memo.

== Partnerships with The Handmaid's Tale ==
In June 2018, it was announced that Equality Now would partner with Hulu's The Handmaid's Tale to release the Hope Lives In Every Name Campaign.

At the time of the campaign's release, Handmaid's Tale executive producer Warren Littlefield said, "We are honored to partner with Equality Now to help raise awareness of the vital work they do for women and girls around the world...Their efforts of addressing and helping correct inequality and injustice where it exists for girls and women especially resonates with the message of our show, and we are proud to be part of this campaign."

In June 2019, Equality Now unveiled its second partnership with The Handmaid's Tale, The World I Want To Live In, which ran in tandem with the series' third season in the U.S. and the U.K.

In August 2019, Equality Now revealed that the organization had been selected as the official charity partner for the release campaign of Margaret Atwood's novel The Testaments, the sequel to The Handmaid's Tale. In a statement, Equality Now said it was "honored" to serve as the event's charity partner and went on to say,

The rollback of women’s rights is as relevant as ever, and we hope that this global movement around The Testaments continues the momentum to fight for gender equality around the world. Although Gilead and The Testaments are fictional, they hold a mirror up to the state of women’s rights today. Gilead depicts a dystopian future in which women are enslaved, married off, raped and denied their most fundamental human rights. The patriarchal and discriminatory practices of Gilead are the practices Equality Now tackles every day.

In a statement, Atwood said she was "delighted" the events surrounding the novel's release would be working in partnership with the organization.

== Additional publications ==
- In March 2020, Equality Now released "Words and Deeds: Holding Governments Accountable in the Beijing Review Process", highlighting sex discriminatory laws in place around the world.
- In January 2019, Equality Now released "Roadblocks To Justice: How The Law Is Failing Survivors Of Sexual Violence In Eurasia." The first report of its kind the report surveyed sexual violence laws in the 15 countries of the Soviet Union.
- In May 2018, Equality Now released its report, "The State We're In: Ending Sexism In Nationality Laws." The report, which documented the consequences of discriminatory nationality laws toward women was subsequently sent to the United Nations Office of the High Commissioner for Human Rights.
- In February 2017, Equality Now published its report "The World's Shame: The Global Rape Epidemic - How Laws Around the World Are Failing To Protect Women and Girls From Sexual Violence " which looked at rape and sexual assault laws in 82 jurisdictions in 73 UN member states.
- In 2016, Equality Now was among the organization that campaigned for a woman to be named UN Secretary-General.
- in 2004, Equality Now launched a campaign against sex tourism companies Big Apple Oriental Tours and G.F. Tours, calling on the US Attorney General to prosecute such companies under the Mann Act and Travel Act.
- In 2003, the anthology Sisterhood Is Forever: The Women's Anthology for a New Millennium (2003) included Jessica Neuwirth's "Globalization: A Strategic Advance for Feminism?"

== See also ==
- Human rights abuse
- Human rights
- Gender equality
- Equal Rights Amendment
- Feminism
- CEDAW
- List of women's organizations
