= Big Apple Oriental Tours =

New York travel agency criticized for sex tourism

- Industry: Travel agency
- Founded: , 1993;
- Founder: Norman Barabash and Douglas Allen
- Headquarters: New York City, U.S.
- Area served: Thailand, the Philippines, and Cambodia
- Owner: Norman Barabash and Douglas Allen
- Website: www.baotours.com

Big Apple Oriental Tours was a travel agency based in New York City. It was criticized for its promotion of sex tourism. In 2013, the operator was convicted in a prostitution sting.

== History ==
The company was founded in 1993. It offered all-inclusive trips to Thailand, the Philippines and Cambodia. Advertising highlighted the erotic atmosphere and easy availability of women in these regions. Tour guides would meet the men upon arrival, explain everything, and transport them to the local bars and brothels.

In 1996, Equality Now, a human rights and feminist group, lobbied the local District Attorney to take action against the company, complaining about promotion of prostitution and possible exploitation of minors. The District Attorney declined to prosecute in 2000, stating that the alleged acts did not occur in New York and were thus beyond the reach of state law. Supported by Gloria Steinem and Congresswoman Carolyn B. Maloney, Equality Now then contacted Attorney General of New York Eliot Spitzer in 2002. Spitzer filed a civil suit against Big Apple Oriental Tours and obtained a restraining order in July 2003, in effect preventing the company from advertising.

Spitzer then made two unsuccessful attempts to charge owners Norman Barabash and Douglas Allen with promoting prostitution. The Attorney General's office obtained the first indictment of Barabash and Allen in February 2004. The case was dismissed in August 2004, because the grand jury had been presented with hearsay evidence and because the judge did not find the law applicable. The dismissal was upheld on appeal based on the hearsay argument. The case was returned to the grand jury and Barabash and Allen were indicted for the same crime again in October 2005. These charges were dismissed in January 2006. The court held that according to the evidence, "What the tour customer did when he arrived at the location is not part of the Big Apple Oriental Tours enterprise."
