= Feminist fist =

Symbol of the women's liberation movement

A variant of the feminist fist symbol

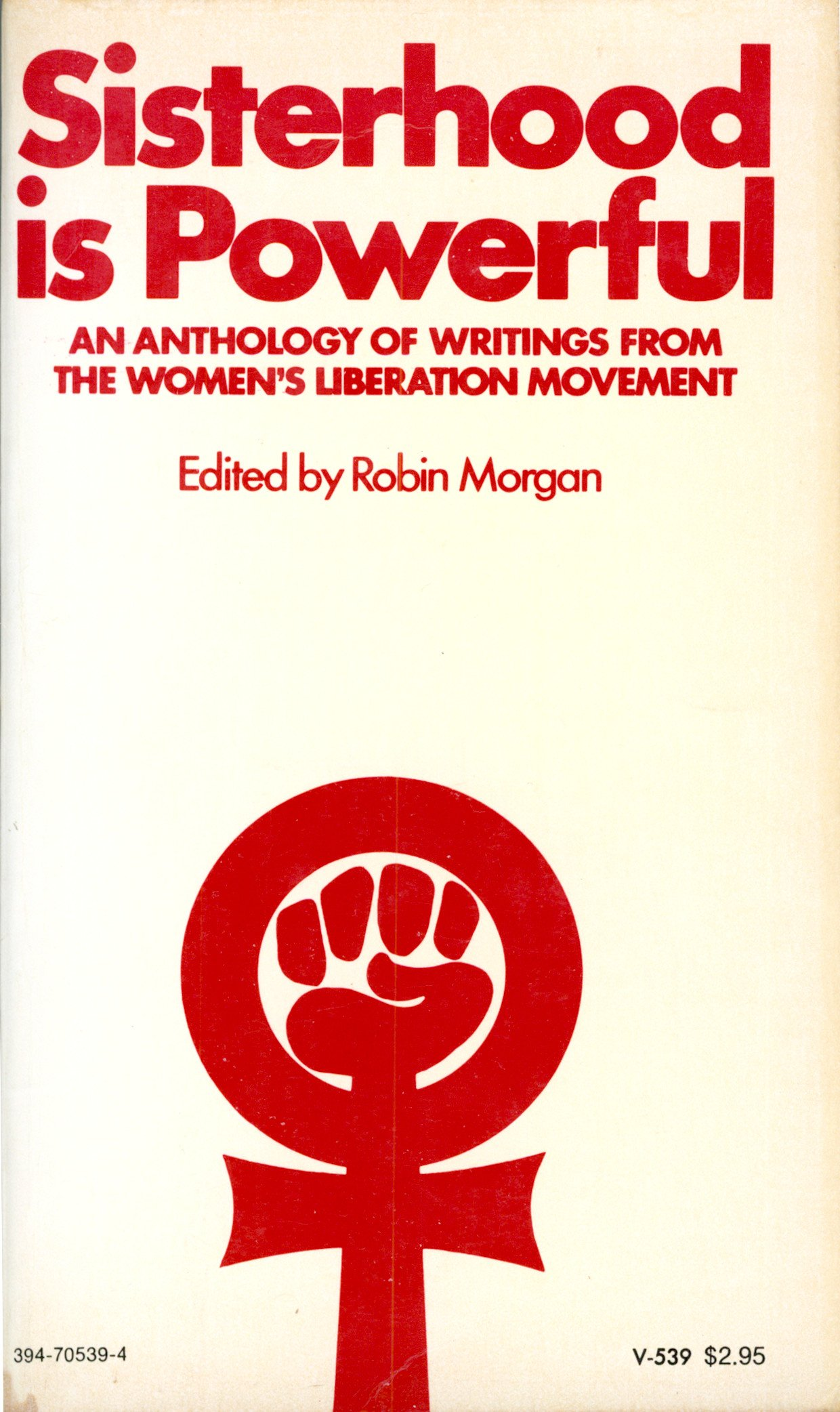
The cover of Sisterhood Is Powerful, edited by Robin Morgan, 1970

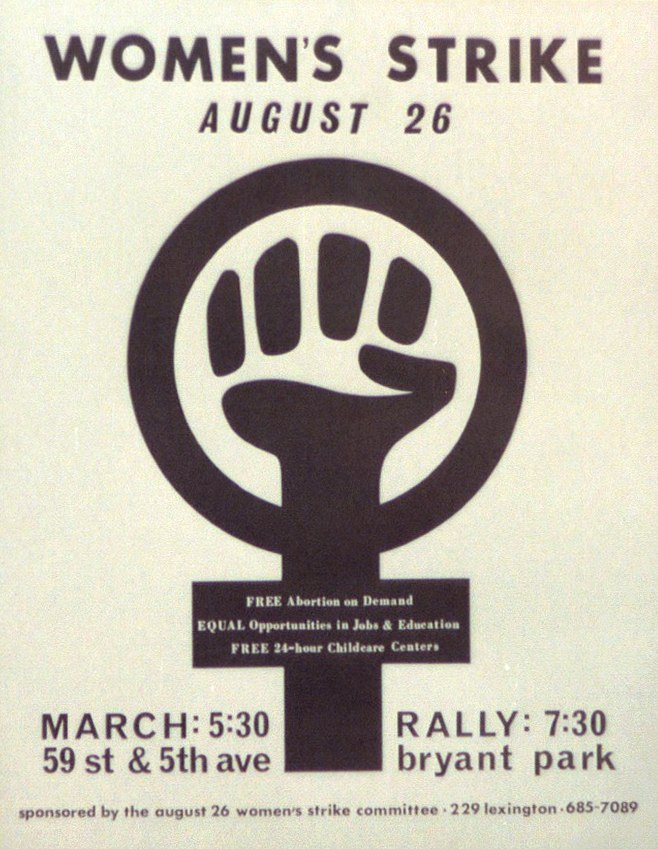
Poster for a women's strike on 26 August, New York, about 1970

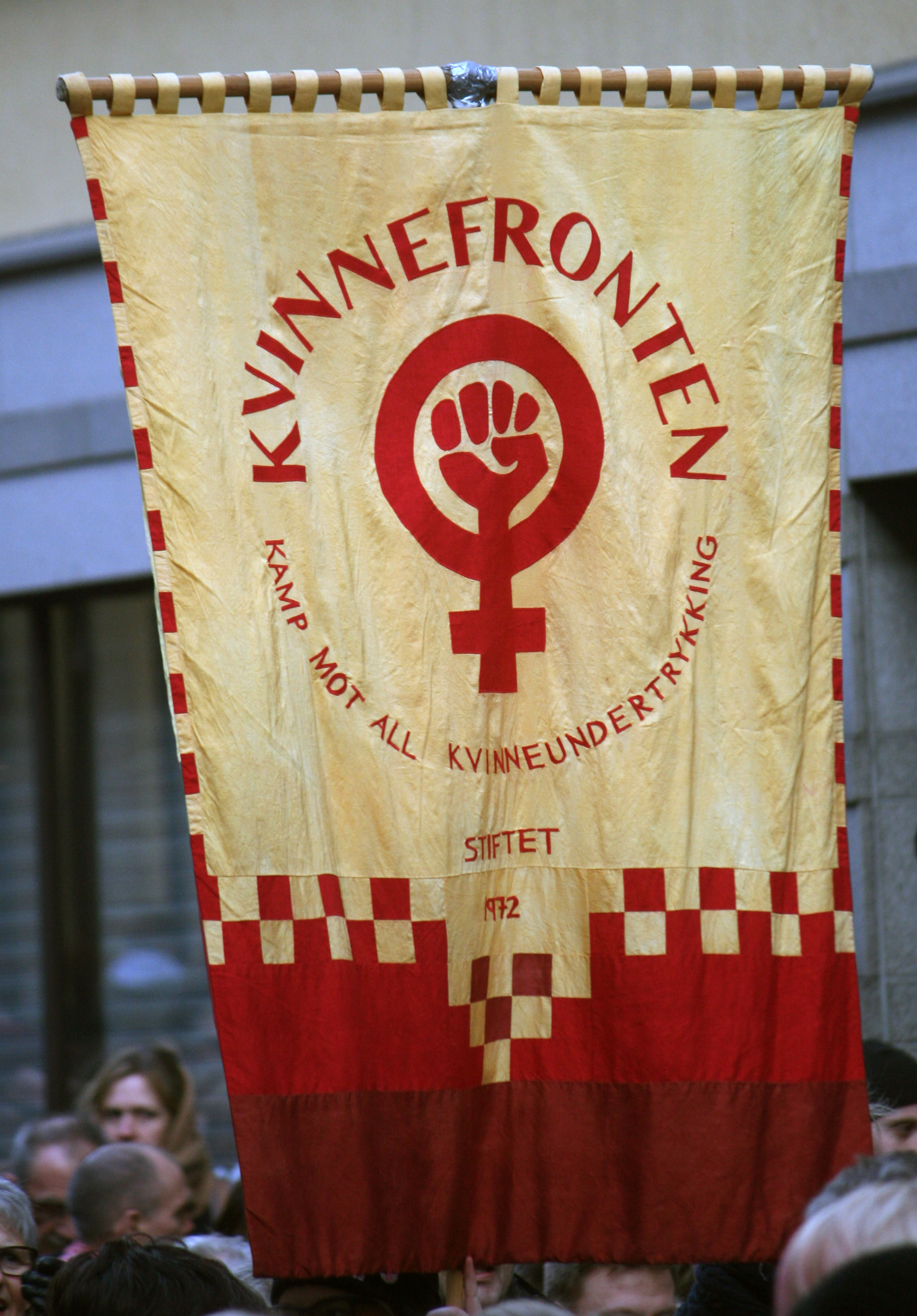
The banner of the Norwegian Women's Front at an International Women's Day march in Oslo, 2014

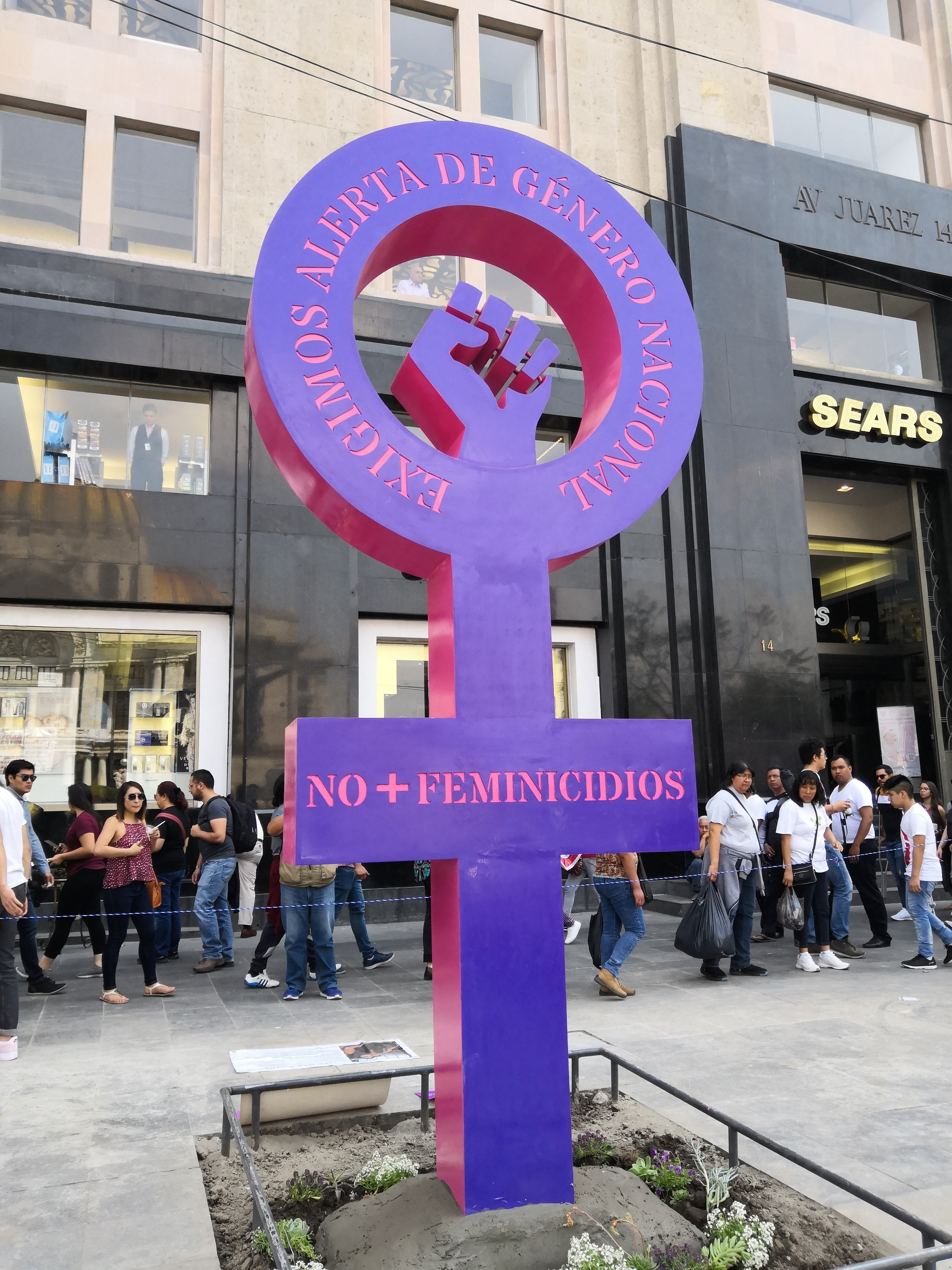
The antimonumenta in Mexico City, March 2019

The feminist fist, also called the women's liberation symbol, is a clenched fist drawn within the circle of the Venus symbol (♀). Created in the United States in the late 1960s, it became an emblem above all of radical feminism. Within a few years feminists far beyond the US had adopted it, and it has since turned up in wall graffiti, on placards, in feminist magazines and in the logos of women's organisations.

== Design ==
The design pairs two existing signs. The circle-and-cross of the Venus symbol is the generally accepted sign for female. The fist signalled strength and a militant, radical stance; in the late 1960s it was identified chiefly with Black power.

Local groups made their own versions while keeping the basic design. On the version worn by feminists in New Haven, for example, the fist bursts out of the circle at its upper edge.

== Origins ==
The movement first tried a different emblem. At a national women's liberation conference outside Chicago over Thanksgiving 1968, the idea came up of a double X in a circle, standing for the female XX chromosome pair. Activists from Nashville printed it on a button the next spring, but it never caught on. Writing in 1974, Jo Freeman contrasted it with the fist design that replaced it, which, she wrote, "combined the elements of defiance and revolution with that of femaleness".

The fist design was drawn by Robin Morgan, one of the organisers of the Miss America protest in Atlantic City. According to the Sallie Bingham Center at Duke University, which holds Morgan's papers, she drew it for the first protest in 1968, taking cues from the Black Power fist and from the 1968 Columbia University protests. Freeman, who photographed the second protest in 1969, wrote that the button was made for that demonstration and first appeared there. Within a short time it had become the movement's signature image.

Morgan's button was printed in dark red on white. Aware that big companies tend to co-opt new protest movements, Morgan feared that the pageant's cosmetics sponsor would cash in on the button by selling a lipstick in the same shade, called "Liberation Red". Demonstrators who were asked about the colour were therefore told to call it "Menstrual Red": a lipstick named after menstruation was something no company would sell.

== Spread ==
The symbol was first used in Britain around 1969. In New Zealand, the feminist Kay Goodger designed a badge based on the American symbol around 1970. Goodger was a founder of the Women's National Abortion Action Campaign, and her badge is now in the collection of Te Papa.

In West Germany, a women's group from Aachen distributed a leaflet explaining the "new logo", the Faust im Frauenzeichen ("fist in the women's sign"), ahead of the national demonstration in Bonn against Paragraph 218, the abortion law, on 2 June 1973.

== Later use ==
From the mid-1970s, as "feminism" replaced "women's liberation" as the movement's name, fistless versions of the women's symbol spread. Groups put their own names inside the circle, or merged it with signs for equality and peace. Some groups kept the fist. Norway's Women's Front, for one, used it as its logo. In 2008, on the other hand, the Canberra Rape Crisis Service abandoned the symbol as "too confrontational". In a 2012 lecture, the Australian political scientist Marian Sawer noted that the fist is absent from the logo of UN Women.

In a 2011 Google Images search for "feminism", it was the most frequent image among the first ninety results. A later variant adds the male sign to it to represent transgender rights. At the 2017 Women's Marches on 21 January 2017, marchers in cities across the United States carried the symbol on placards and wore it on T-shirts and badges.

On International Women's Day, 8 March 2019, women activists in Mexico City installed an antimonumenta, a protest sculpture against femicide, in front of the Palacio de Bellas Artes. It is a large Venus symbol with a raised fist. Families of femicide victims later installed antimonumentas in other cities, among them Guadalajara on 25 November 2020.

On 25 November 2021, the International Day for the Elimination of Violence Against Women, a similar antimonumenta was unveiled in Mérida, in memory of victims of femicide and in support of their families. The structure, nearly two metres tall, shows the women's symbol with a fist. Feminist organisations in Yucatán donated it, and the city council approved its placement at the end of the Paseo de Montejo the day before it was unveiled.
