= Yasmeen Hassan =

American lawyer and women's rights activist

- یاسمین حسن
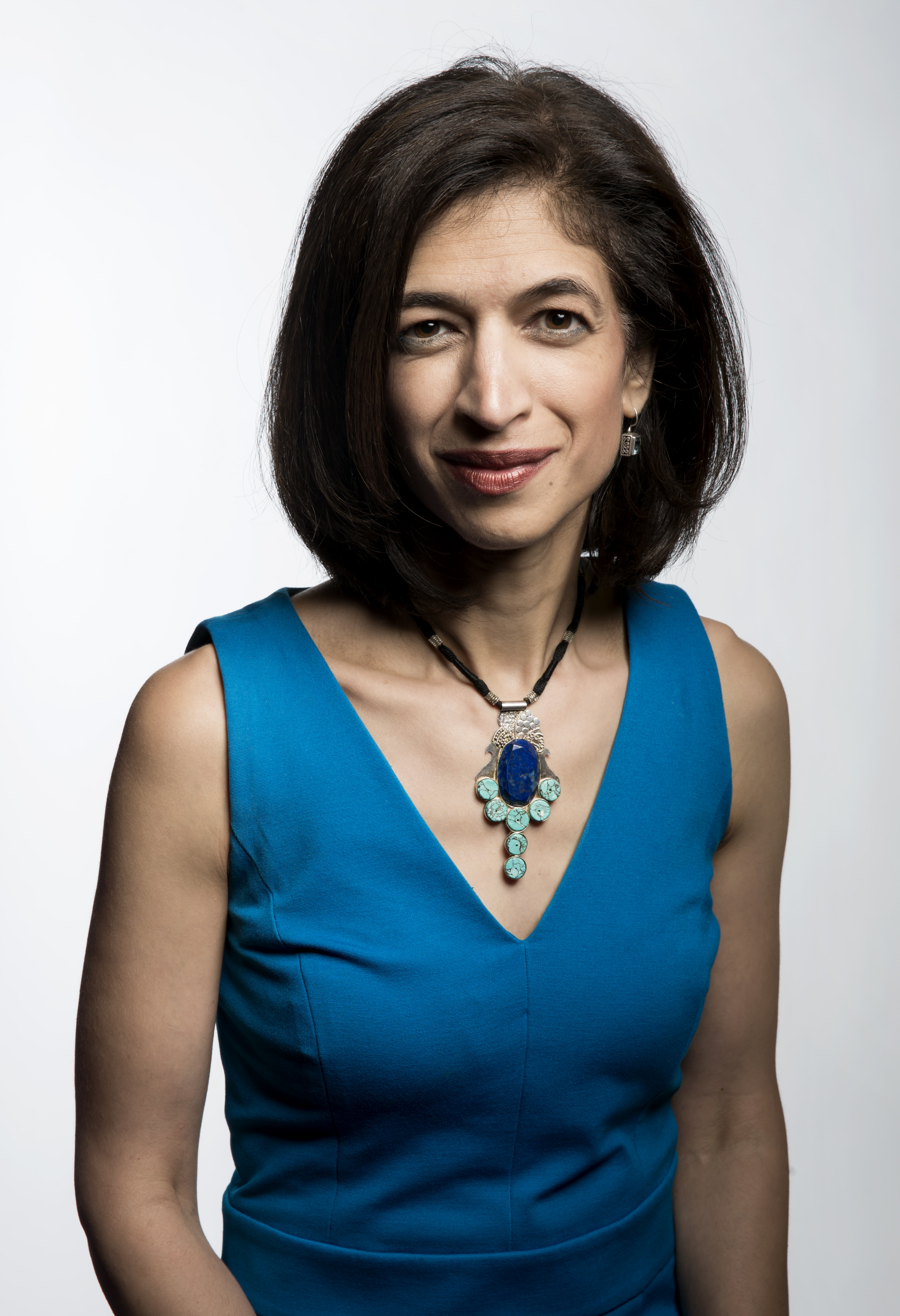
- Born: 1969; Lahore, Pakistan
- Education: Mount Holyoke College, Harvard Law School
- Known for: Lawyer, Human Rights Advocate
- Awards: Forbes' 50 over 50, Sakhi for South Asian Women Gender Justice Award, Stanford Law School National Public Service Award

Yasmeen Hassan (Urdu: یاسمین حسن) is a Pakistani-American attorney and international women's rights activist. She served as the Global Executive Director of Equality Now from 2011 to 2022.

== Background ==
Hassan was born and raised in Pakistan. She moved to the United States in 1987 to attend Mount Holyoke College, earning a BA, magna cum laude, Phi Beta Kappa in Political Science in 1991. She obtained her J.D. magna cum laude from Harvard Law School in 1994.

The Islamization of Pakistan under the government of general Muhammad Zia-ul-Haq was the primary impetus for Hassan's future advocacy for women and girls. She witnessed at an early age how these legal shifts effectively reduced women to second-class citizens. This experience alerted her to the potential of law as a driving force for social change, motivating her to pursue a legal education.

== Career ==
Hassan's commentary has featured on CNN, Al Jazeera, and in The New York Times, The Washington Post, The Sunday Times, and The Huffington Post.

Hassan has been a member of the advisory board for Gucci's Chime For Change campaign since 2013. Hassan was previously a member of the advisory circle for the Women's Building in New York City.

== Awards and recognition ==
- Sakhi for South Asian Women Gender Justice Award, 2017
- Stanford Law School National Public Service Award, 2019
- Forbes' 50 over 50 women, 2021
