= Amna Elsadik Badri =

Sudanese academic, writer, and activist for women's rights

- Born: Omdurman
- Occupation: Sudanese academic

Academic background
- Education: University of Khartoum 1975.

Amna Elsadik Badri (Arabic: آمنة الصادق بدري) is a Sudanese academic writer, and activist, focusing on women's education in Sudan. She is the vice president for academic affairs at Ahfad University for Women, the first women's college in the country, where she has taught since 1973.

== Early life and education ==
Amna Elsadik Badri was born in Omdurman, Sudan. She graduated from Omdurman High School in 1969 and then attended the University of Khartoum, where she obtained a bachelor's degree in 1975. After receiving a master's degree in economics from the University of California in 1978, she returned to the University of Khartoum, where she graduated with a Ph.D. in 1987.

== Academic career ==
Since 1973, Badri has worked as a professor at the Ahfad University for Women, Sudan's first women's college. She is one of many professors at this institution, who are members of the extended Badri family, which founded the school.

She is the university's longtime vice president for academic affairs. In this role, she represents Northern Africa at the Forum for African Women Vice Chancellors.

Since 1987, Badri has overseen the university's feminist publication, The Ahfad Journal. She has frequently spoken out against the cultural and traditional barriers to women's education in Sudan.

In 2019, Badri was named among the potential candidates to serve as minister of education in the cabinet of Sudan's new prime minister, Abdalla Hamdok. The post eventually was filled by Mohammed el-Amin el-Tom.

== Writing ==
Badri is considered a pioneer of women's journalism in Sudan for her work on The Ahfad Journal and other projects. Her essay "Women's Studies - and a New Village Stove" was included in the 1984 feminist anthology Sisterhood Is Global. In 1999, she wrote a book on adult literacy referring to speakers of Arabic with Asya Makkawi Ahmed which was published by UNESCO in Cairo.

Other works include various Arabic-language books and essays on female genital mutilation, internally displaced women in Sudan, women in post-conflict peace building, and similar subjects.
