= Dreams of Trespass =

1994 novel

Dreams of Trespass: Tales of a Harem Girlhood
- Author: Fatima Mernissi
- Language: English
- Genre: Memoir
- Publisher: Perseus Books
- Publication date: 1994
- Publication place: Morocco
- Media type: Print (Hardcover and Paperback)
- Pages: 242 (paperback edition)
- ISBN: 0-201-48937-6 (paperback edition)

Dreams of Trespass: Tales of a Harem Girlhood is a novel by Fatima Mernissi; the UK title has been The Harem Within: Tales of a Moroccan Girlhood. It describes her fictionalised youth in a Moroccan harem during the 1940s, and explores the themes of Islamic feminism, Arab nationalism, French colonialism and the clash between the traditional and the modern. It is a fictional work, although this fact is only noted in the French version, not the English.

The book centers around the harem experiences of a girl named Fatima. The women around her endure patriarchal rules that restrict their lives. They challenge such rules as un-Islamic, and Fatima's mother ensures that Fatima gets an education. The book has been seen as challenging Orientalist stereotypes of Muslim women, and being an example of Islamic feminist literature.

== Content ==
This details a fictive account of Mernissi's childhood and adolescence in a traditional harem in Fez, Morocco, during the 1940s and early 1950s. The protagonist narrates her childhood at both the traditional, walled harem in Fez and the equally traditional but geographically open harem belonging to her grandfather, in the countryside.

Fatima's mother desires to see her children independent (throughout the novel the mother remains nameless). When Fatima is born, her mother insists on celebrating her birth just as the birth of Samir, her male cousin. She persuades Fatima's father to send Fatima to school. Fatima's mother sometimes clashes with the family matriarch, Fatima's grandmother, as the latter is quite traditional. But Fatima's mother's views are supported by Aunt Habiba, a divorcee, and cousin Chama. Aunt Habiba reflects that colonization of Morocco may have been the punishment of Allah against men for oppressing women. Aunt Habiba often serves as an inspiration for Fatima. Fatima herself argues that oppressive traditions are not rooted in Islam. Mina is a former slave, who was kidnapped by slave traders and underwent ordeals in captivity. Her story of resistance and will to survive inspires Fatima. Fatima described her grandfather's position on slavery: "Grandfather was a nice man, but he bought slaves. It was the natural thing to do back then. Now he has changed, and ... he supports ... the abolition of slavery."

Yasmina is Fatima's maternal grandmother who lives in the countryside with her husband and his co-wives, which include Lalla Thor, Yaya and Tamou. Each co-wife has her own garden for growing vegetables and raising hens and peacocks. Yasmina's husband spends one night with each wife, which means she has to sleep alone for several nights in a row. Like her daughter, Yasmina disapproves the patriarchy as un-Islamic. She sees the rules restricting the lives of women as worse than material gates and walls. Yasmina predicts Fatima's life will be better than previous generations.

Chama humorously conjectures how the harem started. Long ago men decided that the ruler would be the one among them who could catch and confine the most women for himself. The Roman emperor won the first round and ruled the East and West because of his large harem. Then, Harun al-Rashid managed to confine the most women in his palace, thus he ruled. Then the Europeans changed the rules: the ruler would be the one who builds the most weapons. That is how the French came to rule the Arabs, even though their president only has one wife. Chama's story delights Fatima, but is condemned as ridiculing custom by the conservative paternal grandmother.

When Fatima was a girl, her father told her that Allah had created boundaries between men and women (hudud): "Harmony exists when each group respects the prescribed limits of the other; trespassing leads only to sorrow and unhappiness." Yet women around Fatima dreamed of trespassing these boundaries all the time; hence the title of the book.

== Characters ==
=== Fez ===
- Uncle Ali: Mernissi's uncle and her father's oldest brother.
- Father: Mernissi's father, the younger of the two brothers who live in the harem
- Lalla Radia: the narrator's aunt
- Mother: Fatima Mernissi's mother, an outspoken feminist and opponent of harem life
- Lalla Mani: Mernissi's paternal grandmother, an extremely conservative, traditional matriarch
- Cousin Samir: Mernissi's male cousin, born just a few hours before her. He is a constant companion throughout childhood
- Cousin Chama: Mernissi's female cousin, a natural performer and storyteller
- Aunt Habiba: near the terrace of the Fez harem, who possesses great tenderness and storytelling skill
- Cousin Malika: Mernissi's manipulative older cousin
- Ahmed: the hired doorkeeper, whose job it is to ensure that none of the women leave the harem without permission
- Mina: a harem slave whose story of captivity inspires Mernissi to bravery
- Lalla Tam: Mernissi's exacting Quranic school instructor; one of the few individuals in the story who are not members of the harem

=== The Harem in the Countryside ===
- Yasmina: Mernissi's affectionate, rebellious maternal grandmother.
- Lalla Thor: The "first wife" of Mernissi's grandfather; (Tazi) who alienates herself from the other wives through her wealth and haughtiness.
- Tamou: a warrior and widow from the Atlas Mountains (An Amazigh), whose family (Father, Husband, and a young Son and Daughter) were killed while combatting Spanish occupation. Mernissi's grandfather Tazi shelters and marries her, and she and Yasmina eventually become friends.
- Yaya: a wife from Sudan, who suffers from homesickness until Yasmina and Tamou find and plant a banana tree for her.

== Author and historical context ==
Fatima Mernissi was a Moroccan feminist. She grew up in a harem in Morocco in the 1940s and the book recounts her experiences. This time period was one of significant cultural change in the country. Morocco was in the midst of a nationalist struggle against French domination. Nationalists had promised equal rights for women. Just as Fatima's mother hoped, Mernissi got an education and became a leading writer in the Arab world.

Filiz Turhan-Swenson sees Mernissi as part of a movement of Muslim women who have presented their own experiences and their struggles with social constraints. This genre debunks the two Western stereotypes of Muslim women: the quiet victim and the lascivious odalisque. This genre also critiques both political and domestic forces that shape their world.

== Analysis ==
Dreams of Trespass blurs the boundaries of autobiography, fiction, and history. The book contains ample references to the independence of Morocco and the role women played in it. The voice of the narrator (Fatima, the author herself) is polyphonic. For most of the book, Fatima is a confused child asking questions about her world. But later this voice modulates into a mature poetic response to the answers of her elders. Alongside these two voices is a third one that sometimes intervenes to give footnotes on Moroccan history and Muslim customs.

Marta Mamet-Michalkiewicz, of University of Silesia, sees the book as deconstructing Orientalist myths regarding the harem.

Filiz Turhan-Swenson writes that the book presents powerful feminist perspectives among women who are older, traditional and illiterate and dislike the patriarchy. This challenges notions that Muslim women in patriarchy either love their own oppression or are unaware that they are being oppressed.

Abdellah Elboubekri writes that in the book, Mernissi criticizes patriarchal construct (e.g. the harem), that are sustained by social customs and beliefs but is contrary to Islamic teachings of female emancipation. Elboubekri thus sees the book as an example of Islamic feminism.

Christine Eickleman points out anachronisms in the book. The word Arabic word "harem" was not commonly used in Morocco at the time, nor the other terms Mernissi uses like "men's power" and "political irrelevance". Likewise, Eickleman argues that as uneducated Moroccans do not understand literary Arabic, the illiterate women of Fatima's household would not have understood Radio Cairo or medieval Arabic literature as easily as they do in the book.

== Reception ==
Dreams of Trespass is Fatima Mernissi's most translated work of fiction. The book has been translated and republished in more than 20 languages.
