= Tinne Vammen =

Danish historian

Tinne Vammen (November 23, 1942 – October 5, 2016) was a Danish historian, considered a pioneer in women's history research in her country.

== Early life and education ==
Tinne Vammen was born in Hillerød, Denmark, in 1942. Growing up in nearby Lillerød, she was one of five children born to Knud Ejnar Daniel Knudsen, an agribusinessman and local Venstre party politician, and Emilie Christiane Mouritzen, a former nursing student.

In 1961, she graduated from the Frederiksborg State School, then worked as an au pair in England. She continued her studies at the University of Copenhagen, first in English and then in history. As a student, she became involved in youth activism, including the Slumstormer squatting movement and the Red Stocking women's rights movement. An essay she wrote about her experience in the Red Stocking movement was later published in the anthology Sisterhood Is Global.

== Career ==
Vammen is considered a pioneer in Danish women's history research. She became one of the first academics in the University of Copenhagen's History Department to examine women's history, conducting in-depth archival studies and producing sweeping narratives of women's role in Denmark's past, as well as helping establish the first interdisciplinary courses in women's research in 1972. She began lecturing in the History Department after obtaining her master's of philosophy in 1973. Later, in the 1980s, she also taught at the Folkeuniversitetet's Center for Women's Research. In the spring of 1991, she was a residential fellow at the Swedish Collegium for Advanced Study in Uppsala, Sweden.

From 1982 to 1984, she served on the editorial board of the journal Kvinders, which promoted women's research. Due to her gender and the subject matter she worked on, she faced difficulties throughout her career, and much of her research was self-financed. Nevertheless, she also worked to increase the participation of female students in history programs. She also worked on an effort to introduce women's history into high school curricula in the early 1980s, and collaborated on women's history initiatives across the Nordic countries.

Her first book, Rent og urent (1986), comprised a groundbreaking discussion of women in the Capital Region, focusing on housemaids and their mistresses, from 1880 to 1920. Her study of the Copenhagen Women's Home was published in 2002 as Midlertidigt ophold. Kvindehjemmet i 100 år. She co-edited the anthologies På tröskeln till välfärden (1995), Charitable Women (1998), and Den privat-offentliga gränsen (1999). She also contributed 86 biographies to the Dansk kvindebiografisk leksikon, a collection of Danish women's biographies.

== Personal life and death ==
In 1966, she married fellow academic Hans Nicolaj Møller Vammen. They had two children, Morten (born 1967) and Ida (born 1979), before dissolving their marriage in 1981.

She died in 2016, of cancer, at age 73.
