= Jessica Neuwirth =

American lawyer and women's rights activist

Jessica Neuwirth (born 10 December 1961) is an American lawyer and international women's rights activist. She is one of the founders of Equality Now, an international women's rights organizations established in 1992, and the founder and director of Frontline Women's Fund, a project hosted by the Sisterhood is Global Institute to support women's organizations around the world. She is the founder and President Emerita of the ERA Coalition and Fund for Women's Equality.

== Background ==
Neuwirth was born and raised in New York City. While in high school, she became a member of the first high school chapter of Amnesty International in the United States. Neuwirth graduated high school at the age of 16 and went on to attend Yale University, where she graduated cum laude with a BA in History in 1982. She went on to receive her Juris Doctor from Harvard Law School in 1985.

== Career ==
Immediately following law school, she was recruited by Amnesty International, where she served as Policy Advisor and interim Deputy Director, as well as Acting Researcher for Southern Africa at the International Secretariat of Amnesty International. While working for Amnesty International, Neuwirth was a producer of the Human Rights Now! tour in 1988, one of the first rock concert tours for human rights which consisted of 20 concerts in 16 countries over the course of six weeks to celebrate the 40th anniversary of the Universal Declaration of Human Rights. After the tour, Neuwirth co-founded Equality Now with South African jurist, Navi Pillay, and lawyer Feral Gharahi in 1992.

She also worked for the law firm of Cleary Gottlieb Steen & Hamilton, the United Nations Office of Legal Affairs, and the United Nations Office of the High Commissioner for Human Rights, also serving the High Commissioner as a Special Advisor on Sexual Violence.

In the 1990s, Neuwirth served as a special consultant on sexual violence to the International Criminal Tribunal for Rwanda for its landmark Akayesu judgment, holding that rape is a form of genocide. She also served as Senior Legal Officer to the Tribunal for its judgment in a media case holding print and radio media accountable for their role in the Rwandan genocide.

Neuwirth subsequently directed the legal team that drafted the judgment of the Special Court for Sierra Leone convicting former Liberian President Charles Taylor of war crimes and crimes against humanity.

In 2011, she founded Donor Direct Action to raise funds for frontline women's groups working in the Democratic Republic of Congo, Somalia, Afghanistan, Nepal and other similarly situated countries and to increase the global visibility of these women's groups.

In 2014, Neuwirth founded the ERA Coalition and the Fund for Women's Equality as "sister organizations". Both organizations were founded to promote sex equality and recognition of women through the addition of the Equal Rights Amendment to the United States Constitution.

As a guest lecturer, Neuwirth has taught international women's rights at Harvard Law School. In September 2018, she was appointed by Hunter College as Distinguished Lecturer and Rita E. Hauser Director of the Human Rights Program at the Roosevelt House Public Policy Institute.

Neuwirth has been published in various news outlets, primarily regarding women's issues. She published her first book, Equal Means Equal: Why the Time for an Equal Rights Amendment is Now in 2015, which examines the landmark legal cases and discriminatory injustices faced by women in the United States that inform the need for an Equal Rights Amendment.

== Awards ==
Neuwirth has received the following honors and awards:

- Susan B. Anthony Award, National Organization for Women, New York City Chapter, 1997
- Special Citation, Advice Desk for Abused Women, Durban, South Africa, 2000
- Ms. Women of the Year Award, 2003
- Visionary Ending Violence Award, Harvard Office of Sexual Assault Prevention and Response, 2005
- Edith I. Spivack Award, New York County Lawyers' Association, 2009
- Civic Spirit Award, Women's City Club, 2016
- Women's eNews - 21 Leaders for the 21st Century, 2017

In 2021, she was appointed to the rank of chevalier of the French Legion d'Honneur.
