= Sisterhood Is Forever =

2003 feminist anthology

Sisterhood Is Forever: The Women's Anthology for a New Millennium
- First edition
- Editor: Robin Morgan
- Language: English
- Subject: Second-wave feminism
- Publisher: Washington Square Press
- Publication date: 2003
- Publication place: United States
- Media type: Print (Paperback)
- Pages: 580
- ISBN: 978-0743466271
- OCLC: 51854519
- Preceded by: Sisterhood Is Global: The International Women's Movement Anthology (1984)

Sisterhood Is Forever: The Women's Anthology for a New Millennium is a 2003 anthology of feminist writings edited by Robin Morgan. It has more than fifty women contributing sixty original essays written specifically for it. It is the follow-up anthology to Sisterhood Is Global: The International Women's Movement Anthology (1984), which itself is the follow-up to Sisterhood Is Powerful: An Anthology of Writings from the Women's Liberation Movement (1970).

== Contents ==
Sisterhood Is Forever shows the reader feminism's emphases and accomplishments as of 2003. Essays range in tone from scholarly to narrative and provide both conservative and liberal view points. The focus is on feminism in the United States. The book addresses why feminism is still needed in the 21st century, providing "alarming" statistics about the status of women in the United States in Morgan's introduction.

== Reception ==
Sisterhood Is Forever was considered "multifaceted and compelling" by Publishers Weekly. According to reviewer Kathy Davis, Robin Morgan's touch can be seen throughout the book, showing a clear sense of vision through her choices of essays and her footnotes. While some critics felt that focusing on the U.S. was "problematic," others felt that it made sense, especially in the wake of 9/11.

== In popular culture ==
In a 2019 Paris Fashion Week show, Christian Dior's creative director Maria Grazia Chiuri debuted a collection of T-shirts that read Sisterhood Is Powerful, Sisterhood Is Global, and Sisterhood Is Forever, respectively.
