= Sisterhood Is Global Institute =

International NGO

- Formation: 1984; 42 years ago
- Founders: Robin Morgan; Simone de Beauvoir
- Website: https://frontlinewomensfund.org/sisterhood-is-global-institute/

The Sisterhood Is Global Institute (SIGI) is an international non-governmental organization. For almost three decades, SIGI has been a consultant to the United Nations.

SIGI was founded in 1984 by Robin Morgan and Simone de Beauvoir. A spinoff of "Sisterhood Is Global", SIGI was the "first international feminist think tank".

Frontline Women's Fund was founded in 2011 by Jessica Neuwirth with co-conveners Gloria Steinem and former UN High Commissioner for Human Rights Navi Pillay. In 2015 it was integrated into the Sisterhood Is Global Institute.
