= Hilkka Pietilä =

Finnish ecofeminist economist and activist

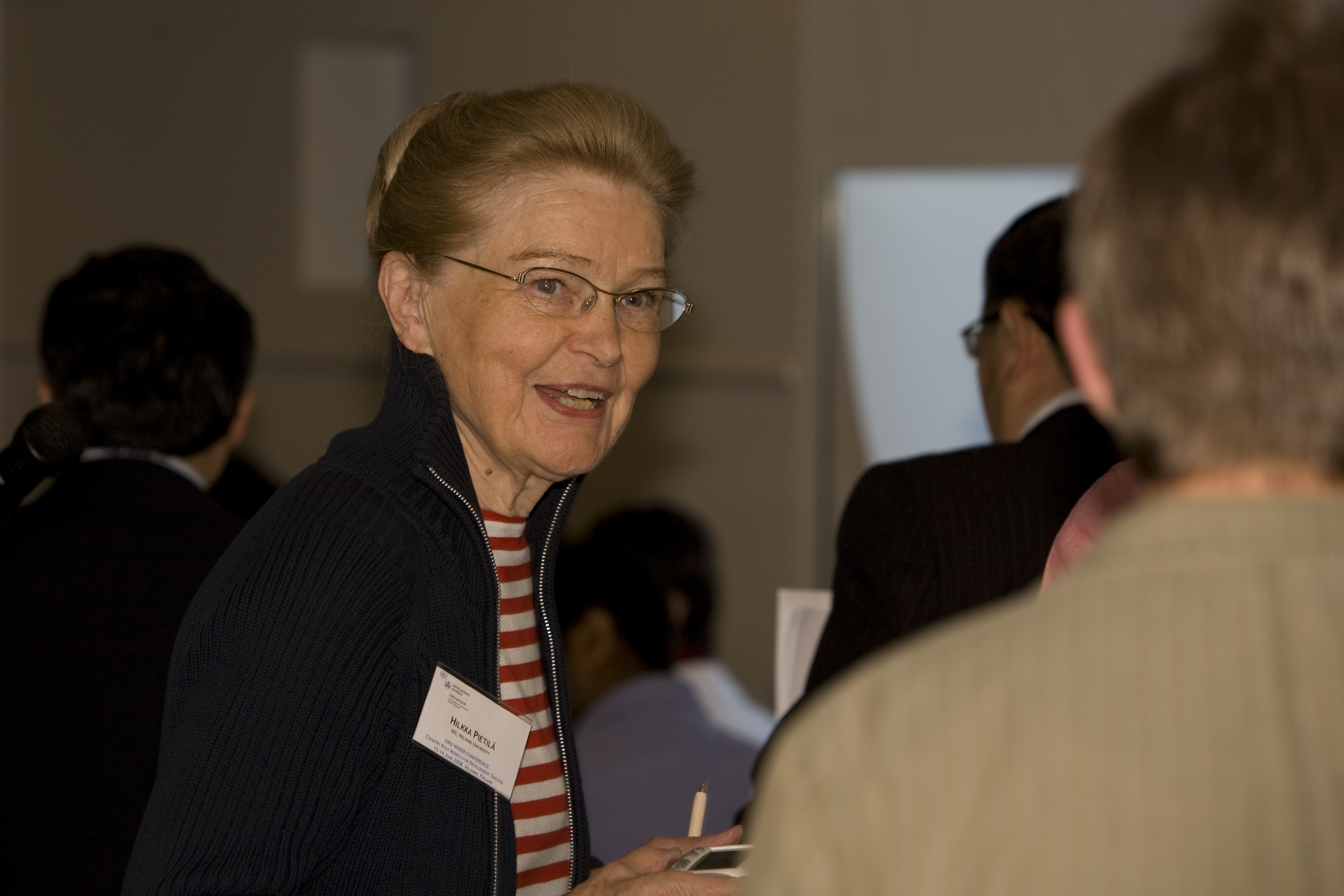
- Pietilä at a 2008 conference
- Born: March 13, 1931; Kiikka, Finland
- Died: December 18, 2016 (aged 85); Helsinki, Finland
- Occupation: Secretary-general of the Finnish UN Association (1963–1990)

Hilkka Maijaliisa Pietilä (March 13, 1931 – December 18, 2016) was a Finnish ecofeminist economist and activist. For 27 years, she served as secretary-general of the Finnish UN Association.

== Early life and education ==
Hilkka Pietilä was born in 1931 in Kiikka, Finland, where her family lived on a small farm.

In 1950, she began studying at the University of Helsinki, where she would graduate with a master's in agriculture and forestry, with a focus on household sciences, in 1956.

== Career ==
Pietilä first became involved in the Finnish UN Association in the late 1950s. Beginning in 1963, she led the organization as secretary-general for 27 years. She was also a longtime board member and honorary chair of the World Federation of United Nations Associations.

During her long involvement in the United Nations system, she was particularly active on efforts to improve the status of women. She was considered "one of the fore-mothers of ecofeminism."

Pietilä wrote about women's rights, peace, and development. As an economist, she argued that analyses of economic output left out the value of household labor and discounted women's contributions. In 1981, alongside fellow economist Kyösti Pulliainen, she published a three-tiered theory of the economy that centered on the home in Suomen Kuvalehti. Her books include Making Women Matter: The Role of the United Nations.

In 1966, 1970, and 1983, Pietilä ran three unsuccessful campaigns for a seat representing Helsinki in the Finnish Parliament, as a member of the Centre Party. After the 1983 election, she felt herself moving away from the Centre Party and chose to leave party politics entirely. Domestically, she opposed her country's accession to the European Union.

After leaving the Finnish UN Association in 1990, she worked as an independent researcher and activist.

== Death and legacy ==
Pietilä died in Helsinki in 2016, at age 85. A fund named in her honor, established by the Finnish UN Association in 2014, offers grants for UN-related research.
