= Robin Morgan =

American poet, writer and activist (1941–2026)

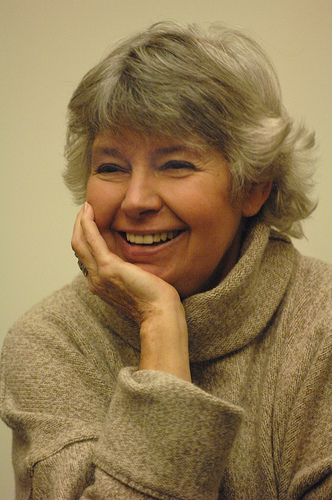
- Morgan in 2012
- Born: January 29, 1941; Lake Worth, Florida, U.S.
- Died: September 5, 2026 (aged 85); New York City, U.S.
- Education: Columbia University (attended)
- Notable work: Sisterhood Is Powerful (1970); Sisterhood Is Global (1984); Sisterhood Is Forever (2003)
- Spouse: Kenneth Pitchford (m. 1962; div. 1983)
- Children: Blake
- Website: Official website

Robin Morgan (January 29, 1941 – September 5, 2026) was an American activist, poet, writer, journalist, lecturer, and one-time child actor. From the early 1960s onward, she was a radical feminist member of the American women's movement and a leader in the international feminist movement. Her 1970 anthology Sisterhood Is Powerful was cited by the New York Public Library as "One of the 100 Most Influential Books of the 20th Century". She wrote more than 20 books of poetry, fiction, and nonfiction, and was the editor of Ms. magazine.

During the 1960s, Morgan participated in the civil rights and anti-Vietnam War movements; in the late 1960s, she was a founding member of radical feminist organizations such as New York Radical Women and W.I.T.C.H. She founded or co-founded the Feminist Women's Health Network, the National Battered Women's Refuge Network, Media Women, the National Network of Rape Crisis Centers, the Feminist Writers' Guild, the Women's Foreign Policy Council, the National Museum of Women in the Arts, the Sisterhood Is Global Institute, GlobalSister.org, and Greenstone Women's Radio Network. She also co-founded the Women's Media Center with journalist and social movement activist Gloria Steinem and actress, author, and activist Jane Fonda. In 2018, she was listed as one of BBC's 100 Women.

== Child actor ==
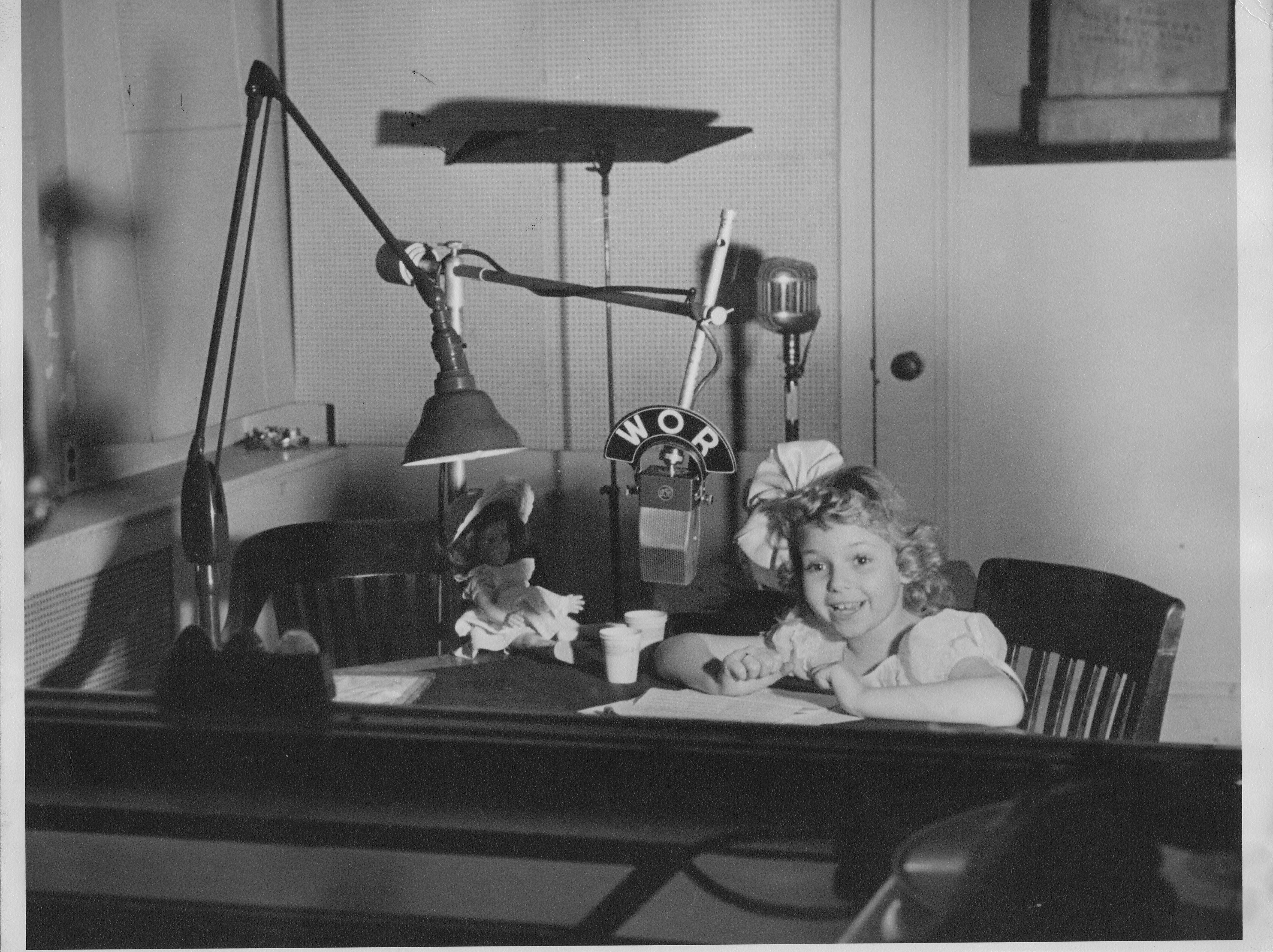
Morgan in the WOR radio studio for The Robin Morgan Show in 1946

The circumstances at her birth led her mother to claim that Robin Morgan was born a year later than she actually was (see birth and parents), and throughout her career as a child actor, she was thought to be a year younger than she actually was, both by herself and others.

As a toddler, her mother, Faith, and mother's sister Sally started Robin working as a child model. At the age of five, believed to be four, she was given her own program, titled Little Robin Morgan, on the New York radio station WOR. She was also a regular on the original network radio version of Juvenile Jury. Her acting career took off when she was eight and began appearing in the TV series Mama, as Dagmar Hansen, the younger sister in the family depicted in the series. The show premiered on CBS in 1949, starring Peggy Wood, and was a success. Morgan played Cecchina Cabrini in Citizen Saint (1947).

During the Golden Age of Television, Morgan starred in such "TV spectaculars" as Kiss and Tell and Alice in Wonderland, and guest-starred on such live dramas as Omnibus, Suspense, Danger, Hallmark Hall of Fame, Robert Montgomery Presents, Tales of Tomorrow, and Kraft Theatre. She worked with directors such as Sidney Lumet, John Frankenheimer, and Ralph Nelson; writers such as Paddy Chayefsky and Rod Serling; and performed with actors such as Boris Karloff, Rosalind Russell, Bill "Bojangles" Robinson, and Cliff Robertson.

Having wanted to write rather than to act since she was four, Morgan fought her mother's efforts to keep her in show business, and left the cast of Mama at age 14.

== Adult life and career ==
As she entered adulthood, Morgan continued her education as a non-matriculating student at Columbia University. She began working as a secretary at Curtis Brown Literary Agency, where she met and worked with such writers as poet W. H. Auden in the early 1960s. She had already begun publishing her own poetry (later collected in her first book of poems, Monster, published in 1972). Throughout the next decades, along with political activism, writing fiction and nonfiction prose, and lecturing at colleges and universities on women's rights, Morgan continued to write and publish poetry.

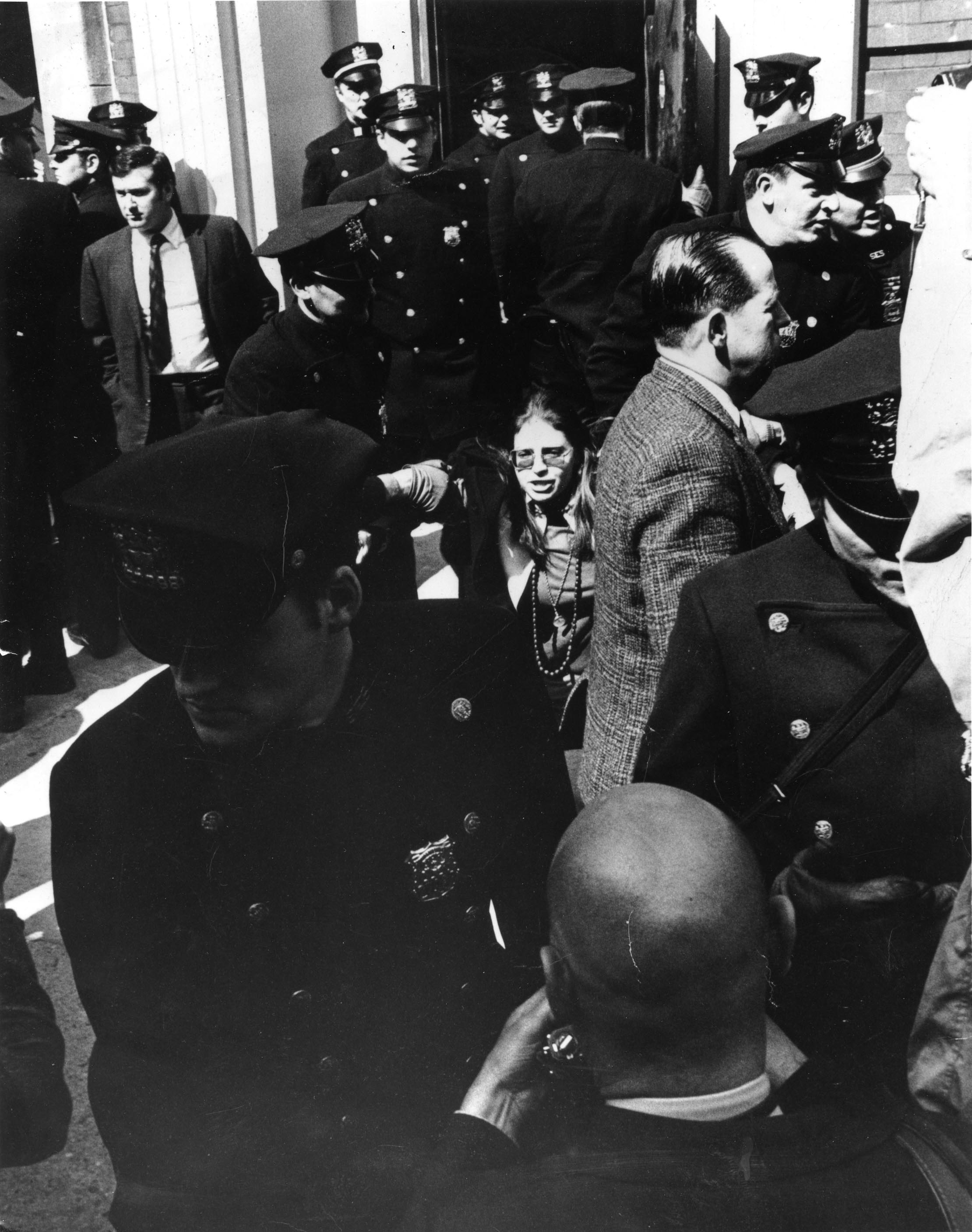
Morgan being arrested at Grove Press in 1970

In 1962, Morgan married poet Kenneth Pitchford. She gave birth to their son, Blake Morgan, in 1969. The couple divorced in 1983. At that time, she was working as an editor at Grove Press and was involved in an attempt to unionize the publishing industry. When Grove summarily fired her and other union sympathizers, she led a seizure and occupation of their offices in the spring of 1970, protesting the union-busting, as well as the dishonest accounting of royalties to Betty Shabazz, Malcolm X's widow. Morgan and eight other women were arrested that day.

In the mid-1970s, Morgan became a contributing editor to Ms. magazine, and continued her affiliation there as a part- or full-time editor in the following decades. She served as editor-in-chief of the magazine from 1989 to 1994, turning it into a successful, ad-free, bimonthly international publication, which won awards for both writing and design and received acclaim among journalists.

In 1979, when the Supersisters trading card set was produced and distributed, featuring famous women from politics, media and entertainment, culture, sports, and other areas of achievement, one of the cards featured Morgan's name and picture. The trading cards are held in the collections of the Museum of Modern Art and the University of Iowa library.

In 2005, Morgan co-founded the non-profit progressive women's media organization the Women's Media Center, with friends actor/activist Jane Fonda and activist Gloria Steinem. Seven years later, in 2012, she debuted a weekly radio show and podcast, Women's Media Center Live With Robin Morgan. The broadcast is syndicated in the US and, as a podcast, is published online at the WMCLive website, and distributed on iTunes in 110 countries. It was praised by The Huffington Post as "talk radio with a brain" and featured commentary by Morgan about recent news, and interviews with activists, politicians, authors, actors and artists. The weekly hour was picked up by CBS Radio two weeks after its launch and is broadcast on CBS affiliate WJFK each Saturday.

=== Activism ===
By 1962, Morgan had become active in the anti-war Left, and had also contributed articles and poetry to such left-wing and counterculture journals as Liberation, Rat, Win, and The National Guardian. In the 1960s, she became increasingly involved in social-justice movements, notably the civil rights and anti-Vietnam War movements. In early 1967, she was active in the Youth International Party (known in the media as the "Yippies"), with Abbie Hoffman and Paul Krassner. However, tensions over sexism within the YIP (and the New Left in general) came to a head when Morgan grew more involved in Women's Liberation and contemporary feminism.

Feminist symbol designed by Morgan for a Miss America protest in 1968, where it was popularized

In 1967, Morgan became a founding member of the short-lived New York Radical Women (NYRW) group. She was the main organizer of their inaugural protest of the Miss America pageant in Atlantic City. She designed the feminist symbol of a raised fist within the Venus symbol for that protest of the 1969 Miss America pageant, where it was popularized. Morgan also wrote the Miss America protest pamphlet No More Miss America!

With NYRW, Morgan published Notes from the First Year in 1968 and Notes from the Second Year in 1970. Both were important publications in the burgeoning women in print movement, an effort by second-wave feminists to establish autonomous communications networks of feminist periodicals, presses, and bookstores created by and for women, which was associated with feminist separatism and lesbian feminism. Notes from the First Year was one of the first identifiably separatist feminist publications in 1968. Over 560 were established in the next five years, many of them run as collectives like NYRW. Morgan's print activism also included participating in the feminist takeover of Rat due to its sexist content and editorial policies. In the February 1970 LibeRATion issue, she wrote: "If men return to reinstate the porny photos, the sexist comic strips, the 'nude chickie' covers (along with their patronizing rhetoric about being in favor of Women's Liberation) — if that happens, then our alternatives are clear. Rat must be taken over permanently by women or Rat must be destroyed."

In 1968, Morgan also co-founded Women's International Terrorist Conspiracy from Hell (W.I.T.C.H.), a radical feminist group that used public street theater (called "hexes" or "zaps") to call attention to sexism. Concerning the feminist organization W.I.T.C.H., Morgan wrote:

The fluidity and wit of the witches is evident in the ever-changing acronym: the basic, original title was Women's International Terrorist Conspiracy from Hell [...] and the latest heard at this writing is Women Inspired to Commit Herstory."

With the royalties from her anthology Sisterhood Is Powerful, Morgan founded the first feminist grant-giving foundation in the US: The Sisterhood Is Powerful Fund, which provided seed money to many early women's groups throughout the 1970s and 1980s. She made a decisive break from what she described as the "male Left" when she led the women's takeover of the underground newspaper Rat in 1970, and listed the reasons for her break in the first women's issue of the paper, in her essay titled "Goodbye to All That". The essay gained notoriety in the press for naming specific sexist men and institutions in the Left. Decades later, during the Democratic primaries for the 2008 presidential race, Morgan wrote a fiery sequel to her original essay, titled "Goodbye to All That #2", in defense of Hillary Clinton. The article quickly went viral on the internet for lambasting sexist rhetoric directed toward Clinton by the media.

In 1977, Morgan became an associate of the Women's Institute for Freedom of the Press (WIFP). WIFP is an American nonprofit publishing organization. The organization works to increase communication between women and connect the public with forms of women-based media.

Morgan traveled extensively across the United States and around the world to bring attention to cross-cultural sexism. She met with and interviewed female rebel fighters in the Philippines, Brazilian women activists in the slums/favelas of Rio, women organizers in the townships of South Africa, and underground feminists in Iran. Twice, in 1986 and 1989, she spent months in the Palestinian refugee camps in Jordan, Lebanon, Egypt, Syria, the West Bank, and Gaza, to report on the conditions of women. Morgan also spoke at universities and institutions in countries across Europe, the Caribbean, and Central America, as well as in Australia, Brazil, China, Indonesia, Israel, Japan, Nepal, New Zealand, Pacific Island nations, the Philippines, and South Africa.

Over the years, Morgan received numerous awards for her activism on women's rights. The Feminist Majority Foundation named Robin Morgan "Woman of the Year" in 1990; she received the Warrior Woman Award for Promoting Racial Understanding from The Asian American Women's National Organization in 1992; in 2002 she received a Lifetime Achievement in Human Rights from Equality Now, and in 2003 The Feminist Press gave her a "Femmy" Award for her "service to literature". She also received the Humanist Heroine Award from The American Humanist Association in 2007.

Limbaugh FCC incident

In March 2012, Morgan, along with her Women's Media Center co-founders Jane Fonda and Gloria Steinem, wrote an open letter asking listeners to request that the U.S. Federal Communications Commission (FCC) investigate the Rush Limbaugh–Sandra Fluke controversy, where Rush Limbaugh referred to Sandra Fluke as a "slut" and "prostitute" after she advocated for insurance coverage for contraception. They asked that stations licensed for public airwaves carrying Limbaugh be held accountable for contravening public interest as a continual promoter of hate speech against various disempowered and minority groups.

=== Sisterhood anthologies ===
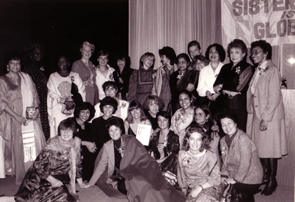
Sisterhood is Global at Lincoln Center

In 1970, Morgan compiled, edited, and introduced the first anthology of feminist writings, Sisterhood Is Powerful. The compilation included now-classic feminist essays by such activists as Naomi Weisstein, Kate Millett, Eleanor Holmes Norton, Florynce Kennedy, Frances M. Beal, Joreen, Marge Piercy, Lucinda Cisler and Mary Daly, as well as historical documents including the N.O.W. Bill of Rights, excerpts from the SCUM Manifesto, the Redstockings Manifesto, historical documents from W.I.T.C.H., and a germinal statement from the Black Women's Liberation Group of Mount Vernon. It also included what Morgan called "verbal karate": useful quotes and statistics about women. The anthology was cited by the New York Public Library as one of the "New York Public Library's Books of the [20th] Century". Morgan established the first American feminist grant-giving organization, the Sisterhood Is Powerful Fund, with the royalties from Sisterhood Is Powerful. However, the anthology was banned in Chile, China, and South Africa.

Her follow-up volume in 1984, Sisterhood Is Global: The International Women's Movement Anthology, compiled articles about women in over seventy countries. That same year she founded the Sisterhood Is Global Institute, notable for being the first international feminist think tank. Repeatedly refusing the post of president, she was elected secretary of the organization from 1989 to 1993, was VP from 1993 to 1997, and after serving on the advisory board, finally agreed to become president in 2004. A third volume, Sisterhood Is Forever: The Women's Anthology for a New Millennium in 2003, was a collection of articles mostly by well-known feminists, both young and "vintage", in a retrospective on and future blueprint for the feminist movement. It was compiled, edited, and with an introduction by Morgan, and Morgan wrote "To Vintage Feminists" and "To Younger Women", which were both included in the anthology as personal postscripts.

=== Journalism ===
Morgan's articles, essays, reviews, interviews, political analyses, and investigative journalism appeared widely in such publications as The Atlantic, Broadsheet, Chrysalis, Essence, Everywoman, The Feminist Art Journal, The Guardian (US), The Guardian (UK), The Hudson Review, the Los Angeles Times, Ms., The New Republic, The New York Times, Off Our Backs, Pacific Ways, The Second Wave, Sojourner, The Village Voice, The Voice of Women, and various United Nations periodicals.

Articles and essays also appeared in reprint in international media, in English across the Commonwealth, and in translation in 13 languages in Europe, South America, the Middle East, and Asia.

Morgan served as a contributing editor to Ms. magazine for many years, receiving the Front Page Award for Distinguished Journalism for her cover story titled "The First Feminist Exiles from the USSR" in 1981. She served as the magazine's editor-in-chief from 1989 to 1994, re-launching it as an ad-free, international bimonthly publication in 1991. This earned her a series of awards, including the award for Editorial Excellence by Utne Reader in 1991, and the Exceptional Merit in Journalism Award by the National Women's Political Caucus. Morgan resigned her post in 1994 to become Consulting Global Editor of the magazine.

She wrote for online audiences and blogged frequently. Among her best-known articles are "Letters from Ground Zero" (written and posted after the September 11 attacks in 2001, which went viral), "Goodbye to All That #2", "Women of the Arab Spring", "When Bad News is Good News: Notes of a Feminist News Junkie", "Manhood and Moral Waivers", and "Faith Healing: A Modest Proposal on Religious Fundamentalism". Her online work is hosted in the archives of the Women's Media Center.

=== Authorship ===
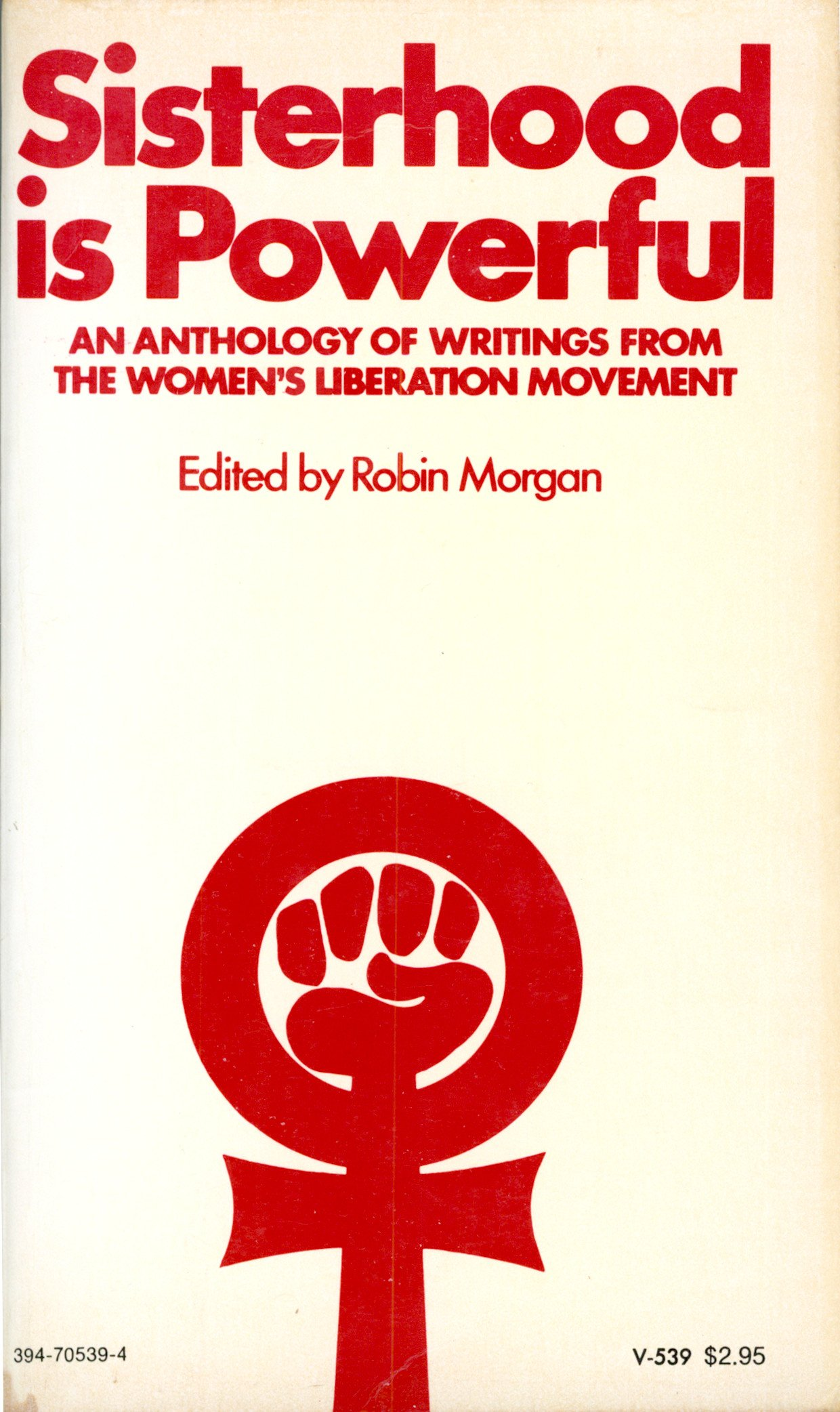
Sisterhood Is Powerful book cover, 1970

Morgan published 21 books, including works of poetry, fiction, and the now-classic anthologies Sisterhood Is Powerful, Sisterhood Is Global, and Sisterhood Is Forever. Well before she was known as a feminist leader, literary magazines published her as a serious poet. According to a 1972 review of her first book of poems, Monster, in The Washington Post: "[These poems] establish Morgan as a poet of considerable means. There is a savage elegance, a richness of vocabulary, a thrust and steely polish.....a powerful, challenging book." In 1979 Morgan received a National Endowment for the Arts Creative Writing Fellowship in poetry, then held a writing residency at the arts colony Yaddo the following year. During this time she worked on a cycle of verse plays.

Morgan's poetry collections include A Hot January: Poems 1996–1999 (W. W. Norton, 1999), Depth Perception: New Poems and a Masque (Doubleday, 1994), Upstairs in the Garden: Poems Selected and New 1968–1988 (W. W. Norton, 1990), Death Benefits (Copper Canyon Press, 1981), Lady of the Beasts (Random House, 1976), and Monster (Random House, 1972). Of the book A Hot January, Alice Walker wrote: "Morgan proves that exquisite poetry can be the most surprising gift of grief. A volume as proud, fierce, vulnerable, and brave as the poet herself." A review of Upstairs in the Garden, noted: "As a vindication and celebration of the female experience, these inventive poems successfully wed feminist rhetoric with vivid imagery and sensitivity to the music of language." Two books of poems, Lady of the Beasts and Depth Perception, earned reviews in Poetry Magazine with critic Jay Parini stating that "Robin Morgan will soon be regarded as one of our first-ranking poets."

She published three books of fiction up to 2015. Her debut novel was the semi-autobiographical Dry Your Smile (published by Doubleday & Company, 1987), followed by The Mer-Child: A Legend for Children and Other Adults (published by The Feminist Press at City University of New York, 1991). Her most recent work of fiction is a historical novel titled The Burning Time (Melville House Books, 2006), set in the 14th century, based on court records of the first witchcraft trial in Ireland. The Burning Time was placed on the Recommended Quality Fiction List of 2007 by the American Library Association, in addition to being the 2006 Paperback Pick by Book Sense (The American Booksellers Association).

Morgan compiled, edited, and introduced several influential anthologies: Sisterhood Is Powerful: The Women's Liberation Anthology (1970), Sisterhood Is Global: The International Women's Movement Anthology (1984), and Sisterhood Is Forever: The Women's Anthology for a New Millennium (2003). She also wrote non-fiction, including Going Too Far (1978), The Anatomy of Freedom (1984), The Demon Lover: On the Sexuality of Terrorism (1989), The Word of a Woman (1994), and Saturday's Child: A Memoir (2001). One of the most widely translated of Morgan's books and a best-seller, The Demon Lover is a commentary on the psychological and political roots of terrorism, and New York Times Book Review called it "Important...compelling....[Morgan] is intense and at times magnificent." Her last published book of non-fiction was Fighting Words: A Tool Kit for Combating the Religious Right (2006).

=== Organizations ===
==== The Sisterhood Is Global Institute ====
In 1984, Morgan, together with the late Simone de Beauvoir of France, and women from 80 other countries, founded the Sisterhood Is Global Institute (SIGI), an international non-profit NGO with consultative status to the United Nations, which has for three decades functioned as the world's first feminist think-tank. The institute has played a leading policy-formulation, strategic, and activist role in the evolution of the international women's movement. SIGI has also developed a global communications network through which an umbrella of NGO interest, advice, contacts, and support is collectively mobilized to empower the global women's movement.

Among its many activities, the Institute pioneered the first Urgent Action Alerts regarding women's rights; the first Global Campaign To Make Visible Women's Unpaid Labor In National Accounts; and the first Women's Rights Manuals For Muslim Societies (in 12 languages). Its most recent project is Donor Direct Action (donordirectaction.org), which links front-line women's rights activists around the world to money, visibility, and popular support, along with minimum bureaucracy and maximum impact.

==== Women's Media Center ====
In 2005, Morgan co-founded the non-profit progressive organization the Women's Media Center with her friends actor/activist Jane Fonda and activist Gloria Steinem. The focus of the organization is to make women powerful and visible in the media.

=== Lectures and professorships ===
An invited speaker at numerous universities in North America, Morgan traveled, as organizer, speaker, and journalist, across North America, Europe, and the Middle East to Australia, Brazil, the Caribbean, Central America, China, Indonesia, Israel, Japan, Nepal, New Zealand, Pacific Island nations, the Philippines, and South Africa. She also was a guest professor or scholar in residence at a variety of academic institutions. She was guest chair for feminist studies at the New College of Florida in 1971; a visiting professor at The Center for Critical Analysis of Contemporary Culture at Rutgers University in 1987; a distinguished visiting scholar in residence for literary and cultural studies at the University of Canterbury, Christchurch, New Zealand in 1989; a visiting professor in residence at the University of Denver, Colorado in 1996; and visiting professor at the Center for Documentation on Women at University of Bologna, Italy, in 1996. She was awarded an honorary degree as a Doctor of Humane Letters by the University of Connecticut at Storrs in 1992.

== Criticism ==
Morgan was placed under arrest as a direct result of her activism; she had received death threats from both the Right and the Left. According to a New Yorker magazine article published in the aftermath of Morgan's essay "Goodbye to All That" (#2) going viral on the Internet, "At five feet tall Morgan is, not for the first time, the little woman who has started a big war." In her original essay, "Goodbye to All That" (1970), Morgan bade adieu to "the dream that being in the leadership collective will get you anything but gonorrhea," referring to the "male Left". She also asserted that Charles Manson was "only the logical extreme of the normal American male's fantasy."

Two years later, Morgan published the poem "Arraignment", in which she openly accused Ted Hughes of the battery and murder of Sylvia Plath. There were lawsuits, Morgan's 1972 book Monster which contained that poem was banned, and underground, pirated feminist editions of it were published.

As the leading organizer of the 1968 protest of the Miss America Pageant, "No More Miss America!", Morgan attacked the pageant's "ludicrous 'beauty' standards" and also accused the pageant of being racist, since at that time no African American woman had been a contestant. In addition, according to Morgan, in sending pageant winners to entertain troops in Vietnam, the women served as "death mascots" in an immoral war. Morgan asked, "Where else could one find such a perfect combination of American values – racism, militarism, capitalism – all packaged in one 'ideal' symbol, a woman."

Another controversial quote is from her 1978 book, Going Too Far: The Personal Chronicle of a Feminist, where she stated: "I feel that 'man-hating' is an honorable and viable political act, that the oppressed have a right to class-hatred against the class that is oppressing them."

Morgan walked off The Tonight Show in 1969 when it screened vintage footage of her as a child actor while she was trying to speak seriously about the first national march against rape. Of the incident, she was quoted as saying: "Imagine talking about such a subject and having it trivialized like that." In 1974, with her phrase "Pornography is the theory, and rape is the practice" (from her essay "Theory and Practice: Pornography and Rape"), she became a central figure on one of the most divisive issues in feminism, particularly among anti-pornography feminists in Anglophone countries.

In 1973, Robin Morgan gave the keynote speech at the West Coast Lesbian Conference, in which she criticized Beth Elliott, a performer and organizer of the conference, for being a transgender woman. In this speech she referred to Elliott as a "transsexual male" and used male pronouns throughout, charging her with being "an opportunist, an infiltrator, and a destroyer-with the mentality of a rapist." At the end of her speech she called for a vote on ejecting Elliott, with over two-thirds voting to allow her to remain; however, the minority threatened to disrupt the conference and Elliott chose to leave after her performance to avoid this. The event demonstrated the high tension surrounding transgender women's involvement in the women's movement of the 1970s.

== Personal life ==
Robin Morgan grew up in New York, first in Mount Vernon, and later in Manhattan, on Sutton Place. She graduated from The Wetter School in Mount Vernon, in 1956, and was privately tutored from then until 1959. She published her first serious poetry in literary magazines at age 17.

In an article published by the Jewish Women's Archive, Morgan revealed that she was of Jewish ancestry, but identified her religion as Wiccan and/or atheist. She is quoted as saying, "When compelled to define myself specifically in ethnic terms—I have described myself as being European American of Ashkenazic (with a touch of Sephardic) Jewish ancestry. I respect and understand the desire of others to affirm their ethnic roots as central to their identities, but while I'm quite proud of mine, I feel they're just not particularly central to my identity. I am deeply opposed to all patriarchal religions, including though not limited to Judaism." Morgan continued to tackle topics such as religion, politics and sex in commentaries on her radio show WMC Live with Robin Morgan.

In her final years, Robin Morgan lived in Manhattan. Blake Morgan, her son with ex-husband Kenneth Pitchford, is a musician, recording artist, and founder of New York-based record company ECR Music Group.

In 2000 Norton published Morgan's memoir, Saturday's Child, in which she wrote candidly about "the shadowy circumstances of her birth; a lifelong, impassioned, love-hate relationship with her mother; her years as a famous child actor and her fight to escape show business to become a serious writer; her marriage to a fiery bisexual poet and how motherhood transformed her life; her years in the civil rights movement, the New Left, and counterculture; her emergence a leader of global feminism; and her love affairs with women as well as men," according to BookNews.com. In her book, "her passion for writing, especially poetry, is vividly conveyed, as is her love and respect for her son, born in 1969," according to The New York Times Book Review.

In April 2013, Morgan announced publicly that she had been diagnosed with Parkinson's disease, discussing the diagnosis on her radio show WMC Live with Robin Morgan, revealing that she had been diagnosed in 2010, but that her quality of life was thus far "normal". Morgan became active with the Parkinson's Disease Foundation (PDF), completing training to become part of the organization's Parkinson's Advocates in Research initiative. In 2014 she was the catalyst and took a leadership role in PDF's new Women and PD initiative, which sought to better serve women impacted by Parkinson's disease by understanding and resolving gender inequalities in PD research, treatment, and caregiver support. Morgan also wrote new poetry inspired by her battle with the disease, and performed a reading of some of the poems as a TED Talk, at the TEDWomen 2015 conference.

=== Early life and family background ===
Her mother, Faith Berkeley Morgan, traveled from her New York residence to Florida to give birth, in order to avoid public scrutiny for her unmarried status. Robin's father, a medical doctor named Mates Morgenstern, did not accompany pregnant Faith on her trip.

Until Morgan was 13 years old, her mother Faith claimed that Robin's father had been killed in World War II. However, Robin overheard conversations between her mother and aunt suggesting her father was alive. When she confronted her mother, Faith changed her story to assert that Robin's father had escaped from one Nazi concentration camp after another, and that she had saved his life by sponsoring his immigration to the United States where he had no family. Not until several years later did Robin get proof that this was also a lie.

Morgan learned the truth, both about her father, who was still alive, and how old she really was, early in 1961. Now a young woman, no longer working in show business, Robin found a listing for the medical practice of an obstetrician, Dr. Mates Morgenstern, in the New Brunswick, New Jersey telephone directory. Suspecting this might be her father, she sought a meeting with him, without her mother's knowledge, and ultimately paid a surprise visit to his New Jersey office in January 1961.

Morgenstern revealed that he was aware of Robin's fame as a child actor, but had remained firm in his decision to avoid contact with Faith Morgan, having chosen not to see her again after the only time he visited her and the infant Robin. He also told Robin, during their conversation in his medical office, that she in fact was born on January 29, 1941, exactly one year earlier than she thought, and disclosed the copy of her original birth certificate, that he had stored in his office. In order to conceal the out-of-wedlock birth, Faith Morgan had asked her Florida obstetrician to sign an affidavit stating that the birth took place on January 29, 1942.

During the conversation in his office, Morgenstern told his daughter that he first met her mother after his arrival in the United States, more than a year before the United States entered World War II, that they had no connection to each other prior to that, and that she had had nothing to do with changing his status as an immigrant. He added that he had known Faith only briefly and claimed that she had fantasized that their relationship was more important than it was. By the time Morgan met her father, he had married and had two sons with a woman he had known since they were both children in Austria. Having been separated by the war, they resumed their relationship after she arrived in the United States not long after Robin was born, which possibly also contributed to Morgenstern's decision to abandon Faith and their daughter.

Robin Morgan met her father only once more, in February 1965 when he invited her and her husband for dinner at his New Jersey home. Morgenstern did not want his sons to know that they had a half-sister and Morgan acceded to his request that they tell his two sons that she was "the daughter of an old friend." She refused to do so again, however, and never met him or her two half-brothers again.

Morgan described the two encounters that she had with her biological father in her autobiography, Saturday's Child: A Memoir.

In the early 1980s, Faith Morgan, in her early 60s, developed Parkinson's disease. Robin telephoned her biological father to let him know. When she asked if he wanted to say goodbye, he declined. During Faith's illness, her life savings, which consisted of the money Robin had earned in her radio and television career (by then a six-figure sum that had accumulated in the bank), was stolen, by her two elderly home caregivers. Soon after Faith’s funeral, which the two women attended, Morgan discovered what they had done, but ultimately chose not to press criminal charges.

=== Death ===
Morgan died at a hospital in Manhattan, New York City, on September 5, 2026, at the age of 85. She had recently been experiencing health issues and had developed Parkinson's disease sixteen years prior. She died three days after her friend and fellow Women's Media Center co-founder Gloria Steinem.

== Legacy ==
Following her death, The New York Times noted Morgan as the "face of radical feminism" whose works helped build the "institutions of the modern feminist movement". The Associated Press mentioned how Morgan "embodied and inspired historic changes in how women lived and thought". She was also regarded as the architect of the modern women's movement.

Considered an influential anthologist, her 1970 work Sisterhood Is Powerful was cited by the New York Public Library as "One of the 100 Most Influential Books of the 20th Century".

== Archives ==
Morgan's papers are held by the Duke University Sallie Bingham Center for Women's History and Culture archives. The collection includes correspondence, drafts of Morgan's writings, teaching materials, photographs, audiovisual material, and a digital archive of Morgan's website.

Harvard University Library also holds a smaller collection of Morgan's papers, including personal papers, correspondence, subject and research files, and financial records.

== Filmography ==
1940s

- Citizen Saint: The Life of Mother Cabrini (playing Francesca S. Cabrini as a child)
- The Little Robin Morgan Show as herself (WOR radio show)
- Juvenile Jury as herself

1950s

- Mama as Dagmar Hansen
- Kraft Television Theatre's Alice in Wonderland (as Alice)
- Mr. I-Magination (as self)
- Tales of Tomorrow (starring as Lily Massner)
- Kiss and Tell TV Special (starring as Corliss Archer, 1956)
- Other videos and kinescopes in the Robin Morgan Collection at the Paley Center for Media, NYC

1980s–2010s

- Not a Love Story: A Film About Pornography (feature length documentary) (as herself) (1981)
- The American Experience TV Documentary (as herself) (2002)
- 1968 TV Documentary with Tom Brokaw (as herself) (2007)
- Interview by Ronnie Eldridge (2007)
- Makers: Women Who Make America on PBS (2013)

== Publications ==
=== Poetry ===
- 1972: Monster (Vintage, ISBN 978-0-394-48226-2)
- 1976: Lady of the Beasts: Poems (Random House, ISBN 978-0-394-40758-6)
- 1981: Death Benefits: A Chapbook (Copper Canyon, Limited Edition of 200 copies)
- 1982: Depth Perception: New Poems and a Masque (Doubleday, ISBN 978-0-385-17794-8)
- 1999: A Hot January: Poems 1996–1999 (W. W. Norton, ISBN 978-0-393-32106-7)
- 1990: Upstairs in the Garden: Poems Selected and New (W. W. Norton, ISBN 0-393-30760-3)

=== Nonfiction ===
- 1977: Going Too Far: The Personal Chronicle of a Feminist, (Random House, ISBN 0-394-72612-X)
- 1982: The Anatomy of Freedom (W.W. Norton, ISBN 978-0-393-31161-7)
- 1989: The Demon Lover: On the Sexuality of Terrorism (W. W. Norton, ISBN 0-7434-5293-3)
  - 2001: The Demon Lover: The Roots of Terrorism (Updated Second Edition, Washington Square Press/Simon & Schuster, Inc., ISBN 978-0-7434-5293-9)
- 1992: The Word of a Woman (W.W. Norton, ISBN 978-0-393-03427-1)
- 1995: A Woman's Creed (pamphlet), The Sisterhood Is Global Institute
- 2001: Saturday's Child: A Memoir (W. W. Norton, ISBN 0-393-05015-7)
- 2006: Fighting Words: A Toolkit for Combating the Religious Right (Nation Books, ISBN 1-56025-948-5)

=== Fiction ===
- 1987: Dry Your Smile (Doubleday, ISBN 978-0-7043-4112-8)
- 1991: The Mer-Child: A New Legend for Children and Other Adults (The Feminist Press, ISBN 978-1-55861-054-5)
- 2006: The Burning Time (Melville House, ISBN 1-933633-00-X)

=== Anthologies ===
- 1969: The New Woman (Poetry Editor) (Bobbs-Merrill, LCCN 70-125895)
- 1970: Sisterhood is Powerful: An Anthology of Writings from the Women's Liberation Movement (Random House, ISBN 0-394-70539-4)
- 1984: Sisterhood Is Global: The International Women's Movement Anthology (Doubleday/Anchor Books; revised, updated edition The Feminist Press, 1996, ISBN 978-1-55861-160-3)
- 2003: Sisterhood Is Forever: The Women's Anthology for a New Millennium (Washington Square Press, ISBN 0-7434-6627-6)

=== Essays ===
- "The politics of sado-masochistic fantasies" in Linden, Robin Ruth (1982). Against sadomasochism: a radical feminist analysis. East Palo Alto, California: Frog in the Well. pp. 109–123. ISBN 978-0-9603628-3-7.
- "Light bulbs, radishes and the politics of the 21st century" in Bell, Diane; Klein, Renate, eds. (1996). Radically speaking: feminism reclaimed. Chicago: Spinifex Press. pp. 5–8. ISBN 978-1-74219-364-9.

=== Plays ===
- Their Own Country (debut performance, Ascension Drama Series, New York, December 10, 1961, at 8:30pm, Church of the Ascension, reception immediately following.)
- The Duel. A verse play, published as A Masque in her book Depth Perception (debut performance Joseph Papp's New Shakespeare Festival Public Theater, New York, 1979)
