= The Math Myth =

2016 nonfiction book

- Author: Andrew Hacker
- Publisher: The New Press
- Publication date: March 1, 2016
- Pages: 240
- ISBN: 978-1-62097-068-3
- Dewey Decimal: 510.71

The Math Myth: And Other STEM Delusions is a 2016 nonfiction book by Queens College political scientist Andrew Hacker analyzing and critiquing the United States educational system's teaching of mathematics as a linear progression towards more advanced fields. Based on a 2012 New York Times op-ed by Hacker titled "Is Algebra Necessary", Hacker argues that the teaching of advanced algebra, trigonometry, and calculus is not useful to the majority of students. He further claims that the requirement of advanced mathematics courses in secondary education contributes to dropout rates and impedes socioeconomically disadvantaged students from pursuing further education. Hacker critiques the Common Core system and American focus on STEM education in lieu of social sciences, arguing that the educational system should prioritize numeracy over pure mathematics education.

The Math Myth received broadly critical coverage from critics and mathematicians, some citing Hacker's arguments as "disingenuous" and contributing to an elitist attitude towards mathematics, with many citing a lack of exploration on mathematics in early childhood and primary education. Others praised Hacker's work, describing the book as offering a convincing critique of STEM education in the United States and empowering to students struggling in mathematics.

== Background ==
United States primary and secondary educational focus on STEM began to increase in the early 1950s due to investments from the National Science Foundation, although it accelerated massively following the "national embarrassment" of the 1957 Soviet launch of Sputnik and the beginning of the Space Race. American education in science and mathematics began to be seen as a security measure, as attested by the 1958 National Defense Education Act which gave large increases in funding on all levels to mathematical and scientific education courses. In 2010 the National Governors Association released a set of K–12 language arts and mathematics educational standards under the Common Core State Standards Initiative, seeking to standardize educational systems between states and improve the quality and focus of American math education. Subsequent adoption of the Common Core standards by the majority of states prompted a national debate over the role of mathematics and STEM education in general in American schooling, with National Geographic comparing the ensuing politicization of math education to the nationalistic focus taken by the American education system following the Sputnik launch.

Andrew Hacker is an education critic and professor emeritus of political science at Queens College in New York City, known for his works critiquing the American educational system. He published an op-ed titled "Is Algebra Necessary" in the New York Times on July 29, 2012, arguing that while arithmetic and mathematical literacy should be universally taught, higher math concepts like algebra and trigonometry are not useful for the vast majority of students. The article was heavily critiqued by academics, with some claiming that mathematics education teaches students necessary problem-solving skills, even when not directly applicable to real world experience. Several critics stated that a lack of mandatory math education would lead to mathematics becoming an "elite field" only accessible to wealthier and more advantaged students. Seeking to elaborate on his reasonings and critique in response to the large volume of media criticism, Hacker expanded his initial New York Times article into a book titled The Math Myth, published by The New Press.

== Synopsis ==
The Math Myth describes the approach of the contemporary American education system towards mathematics as a "self-delusion", especially critiquing the Common Core standards and the role of obtuse and abstract mathematics in impeding the mathematical literacy of students, arguing that current methods lead to higher drop out rates.

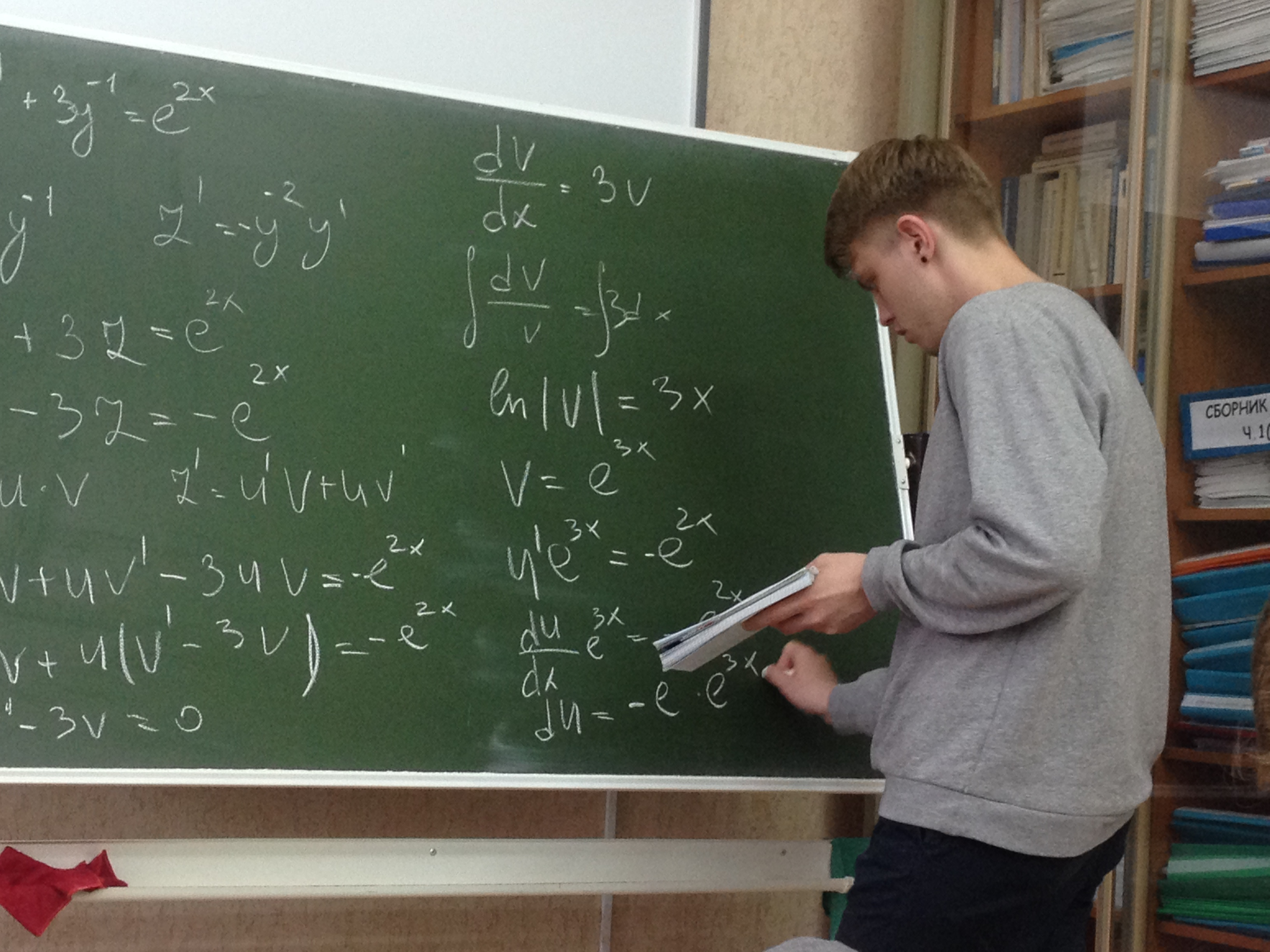
Hacker cites calculus as a particularly inaccessible and unhelpful field of academic study for the majority of students.

The early chapters of the book detail the current state of mathematics education in the United States. Hacker notes that American students are disproportionately likely to fail mathematics, blaming the abstract instruction and standardized testing systems imposed by the No Child Left Behind and Common Core reform initiatives. Hacker acknowledges that socioeconomic factors lead to poorer testing results for disadvantaged students, but states that the harm of modern mathematics education transcends racial and class boundaries. The academic coaching industry, which mainly tutors students in standardized testing (especially of mathematics), is heavily decried.

Hacker argues that the intense focus on math as a metric for student success leads to negative consequences in tertiary education and college access for students. Students not proficient in advanced mathematics are punished in college admissions, even when the majority of students go into fields where such knowledge is unnecessary. Hacker expands on this in the following chapters, with an outline on the limited use of advanced mathematics in the majority of occupations juxtaposed with quotes and testimony of workers from various career fields. Gender gaps in math education are analyzed, with Hacker claiming that while girls tend to get better classroom grades in math classes, male students tend to earn significant higher marks on standardized tests, especially the SATs. Hacker attributes this to a conflict between girls' greater penchant for reflection due to male dominance of lessons, and rigorous and fast-paced testing environments. Any genetic or inherent gender bias towards mathematical ability is however critiqued, noting that female Asian-American students massively outperform the SAT scores of their white male counterparts, despite generally lower family incomes and a higher rate of becoming first generation college students.

Hacker attributes these various disparities to a failure in how student achievement and knowledge is interpreted within the educational system, describing standardized testing as an inaccurate judge of student knowledge and abilities. He disputes that mathematics alone serves to advanced human intelligence or creativity, pointing to the generally high performance of students from oppressive regimes in mathematics olympiads as evidence that "its brand of brilliance can thrive amid onerous repression." He argues that other forms of logical thinking, such as participation within juries and systems of justice, are more valuable to students than mathematical logic.

Hacker attributes the current state of mathematics education in the United States to a "mathematical power-elite" he dubs "mandarins". This small group of mathematics academics, he argues, have led to the imposition of rigid academic policies towards mathematics and standardization initiatives like Common Core. He describes the "math wars" over educational policy as a conflict between two schools of thought: a "discipline" approach stemming from 19th century American academic William McGuffey and a "discovery" approach stemming initially from the work of educational reformer John Dewey. Hacker argues that while the vast majority of K–12 teachers adhere to a "discovery" mode of teaching, supporters of the "discipline" advance a focus on standardized testing and an opposition to the presentation of math in an enjoyable or entertaining fashion.

Hacker concludes his work with "Numeracy 101", advocating the teaching of mathematical literacy as opposed to specific higher math concepts. The chapter takes the form of various lessons taught by Hacker to students at a mathematics course at Queens College, with Hacker stating that the advanced mathematical thinking contained within the lessons are more valuable to students than formulae than higher level mathematics, claiming that merely a combination of arithmetic knowledge with mathematical literacy is required to fit the needs of students in the wider world.

== Reception ==
=== Press ===
Press reception to The Math Myth was mixed, ranging from measured praise to intense criticism. Critiques of the book in The Atlantic and Slate described the book as disingenuous and fearmongering, describing Hacker's proposals as enabling elitist and discriminatory attitudes towards mathematics education and particularly pointing to reinforcement of societal biases against women in mathematics. Evelyn Lamb, writing for Slate, claimed that Hacker had made deliberately misleading use of academic terminology and "repeated misunderstandings and misrepresentations".

Other critics including Dana Goldstein, also writing for Slate, praised Hacker's core critique of the US education system, but stressed a lack of focus on the importance of core mathematical concepts in early childhood and elementary education, cautioning against the abandonment of advanced mathematics education entirely. Mathematician Keith Devlin, writing for Huffington Post, praised Hacker's analysis of the state of the crisis in math education, but strongly decried his proposed solutions: "His narrow, and in many cases out-of-date perception of what mathematics is alienates those of us in the math biz who would otherwise be lining up alongside him."

=== Academic ===
Academic coverage of The Math Myth was generally more positive than in mainstream press. Mathematics Teaching in the Middle School, a National Council of Teachers of Mathematics publication, praised the work for invoking a national discussion on math education and described it as "worthy of in-depth reading and contemplation". A 2023 review in The Mathematics Enthusiast generally agreed with Hacker's arguments, praising the book as "especially helpful as a non-expert’s guide to the current status of mathematics education and its place in society", but took issue with mischaracterization of the Common Core standards, the economic lens and focus on career outcomes which he attacks the marginalizing effects of mathematics education, and his focus on the specific topics taught in classes as opposed to general depth of reasoning. Empirical research reveals the limited utility of mathematics among incumbent workers in the US, and lends credibility to Hacker's Numeracy 101 argument.

== See also ==
- Math wars, recurring disputes about the best way to teach mathematics
- New Math
