= Donna Allen =

Donna Allen may refer to:

- Donna Allen (singer) (born 1958), American singer
- Donna Allen (activist) (1920–1999), American activist
- Donna Allen, a character in the film Alias Nick Beal
