= Conny Czymoch =

German journalist

Conny Czymoch is a German journalist, television moderator, media coach and conference facilitator.

== Life ==
Whilst in secondary education, 1974–1977, Conny Czymoch was already a freelancer with the Wuppertal edition of the regional paper Neue Rhein Zeitung in Essen. She gained her A-levels in 1977, and subsequently was awarded a BA in International Relations and Economics from the University of Reading, UK in 1980. She entered a journalistic training programme at Deutschlandfunk, DLF, a national radio station based in Cologne, Germany, and became a qualified editor at the end of 1981.

In 1982, she reported for and produced a weekly current affairs magazine with Radio Television Hong Kong, RTHK. During this time she also reported for several German radio stations. From 1984 to 1986 she worked as an editor, reporter and presenter at the WDR Cologne studio, turning back to freelancing from 1986 for a number of programmes at DLF, WDR, Deutsche Welle Radio and TV, where she contributed to the political magazine "Focus on Europe" and CNN World Report.

In 1992 and 1993 Conny was a news anchor at the commercial station SAT1 in Hamburg. Following this, she was author and presenter of programs at DLF, Deutsche Welle and WDR, concentrating on issues of political, social and cultural relevance. For two years Conny was the anchor for the German and English language political magazine at DW TV, "Standpunkte / Perspectives”.

During the 90's she also trained young journalists at the Academy for Journalism in Hamburg and later in Munich.

1997 Conny joined the new TV station Phoenix, where she has been an anchor for several formats, most recently the late evening news show "DER TAG".

In spring 2009, she accompanied the UNHCR Council of Business Leaders to refugee camps in southern Africa, reported on it in a daily blog on the CSR site of Manpower Inc. and made a short documentary.

In the fall of 2009, she was the first European journalist to moderate at the Clinton Global Initiative in New York on the topic "Leadership and Solutions to End Human Trafficking and Forced Labor". She has also hosted conferences and events with the like of the former UN Secretary General Kofi Annan, the former NASA chief Michael Griffin and German Chancellor Angela Merkel.

== Personal life and charity ==
For several years, Conny has been an advocate against human trafficking and for women's rights, working for the Not for Sale campaign and Terre des Femmes.

Conny is based out of both London and near Cologne with her partner and is the mother of a grown son.

== Honors and awards ==
The Hugo-Junkers-Award for excellence in space journalism, received in 2007 for the documentary series “PHOENIX ALL-Tag - The Thomas Reiter mission" (coverage of the 6-months mission to the ISS)

== Works ==
- Czymoch, Conny. Modern slave trade 2010. Kidnapped expropriated, exploited: the business of "human goods". International Politics 2010:26-31.
- Conny Czymoch, in: Hans Jürgen Grümmer. Painter and sculptor [for the first posthumous exhibition at the Kunsthaus Rhenania in Cologne, 2 October 2010 to 17 October 2010] ed. Judith Grümmer. With contributions by Jürgen Becker, Conny Czymoch, Dieter Frowein-Lyasso, Thomas Hackett, Christopher Schroer and Jo Schulte-Frohlinde. THE NEW OBJECTIVITY, Lindlar 2010th ISBN 978-3-942139-09-0.
