= Raquel Gaspar =

Portuguese marine biologist

- Born: Dora Raquel Heleno Gaspar; Leiria, Portugal
- Occupation: Marine biologist
- Known for: Work to support the bottlenose dolphin population in the Sado River estuary

Raquel Gaspar is a Portuguese marine biologist and community conservationist known for studying dolphin populations in the Sado River estuary in the Setúbal District of Portugal. She was a founder of the Ocean Alive NGO, which promotes the participation of women from fishing communities to protect seagrass beds and, consequently, the oceans.

== Early life and training ==
Dora Raquel Heleno Gaspar was born in Colmeias in the Leiria municipality of Portugal. As a child, her interest in the sea was sparked by watching television documentaries by Jacques Cousteau. Between 1988 and 1994 she attended the Faculty of Science at the University of Lisbon, where she graduated in marine biology. From 1997 to 2002 she was at the University of St. Andrews in Scotland, where she obtained a PhD. with a thesis on the status of the resident bottlenose dolphin population in the Sado estuary.

== Activities ==
Gaspar worked with the Sado Estuary Natural Reserve (Reserva Natural do Estuário do Sado), using long-term photo ID data to model the viability of the declining dolphin population. During her research work in the estuary, she realized that the survival of dolphins was dependent on the protection of the fish they fed on. In turn, the abundance of these fish depends on the preservation of seagrass beds that serve as their nurseries. Through monitoring of the resident population and its habitat, carried out for more than 20 years, she was able to gather sufficient data to demonstrate that the decline in the dolphin population could be reversed, if the seagrass meadows were protected.

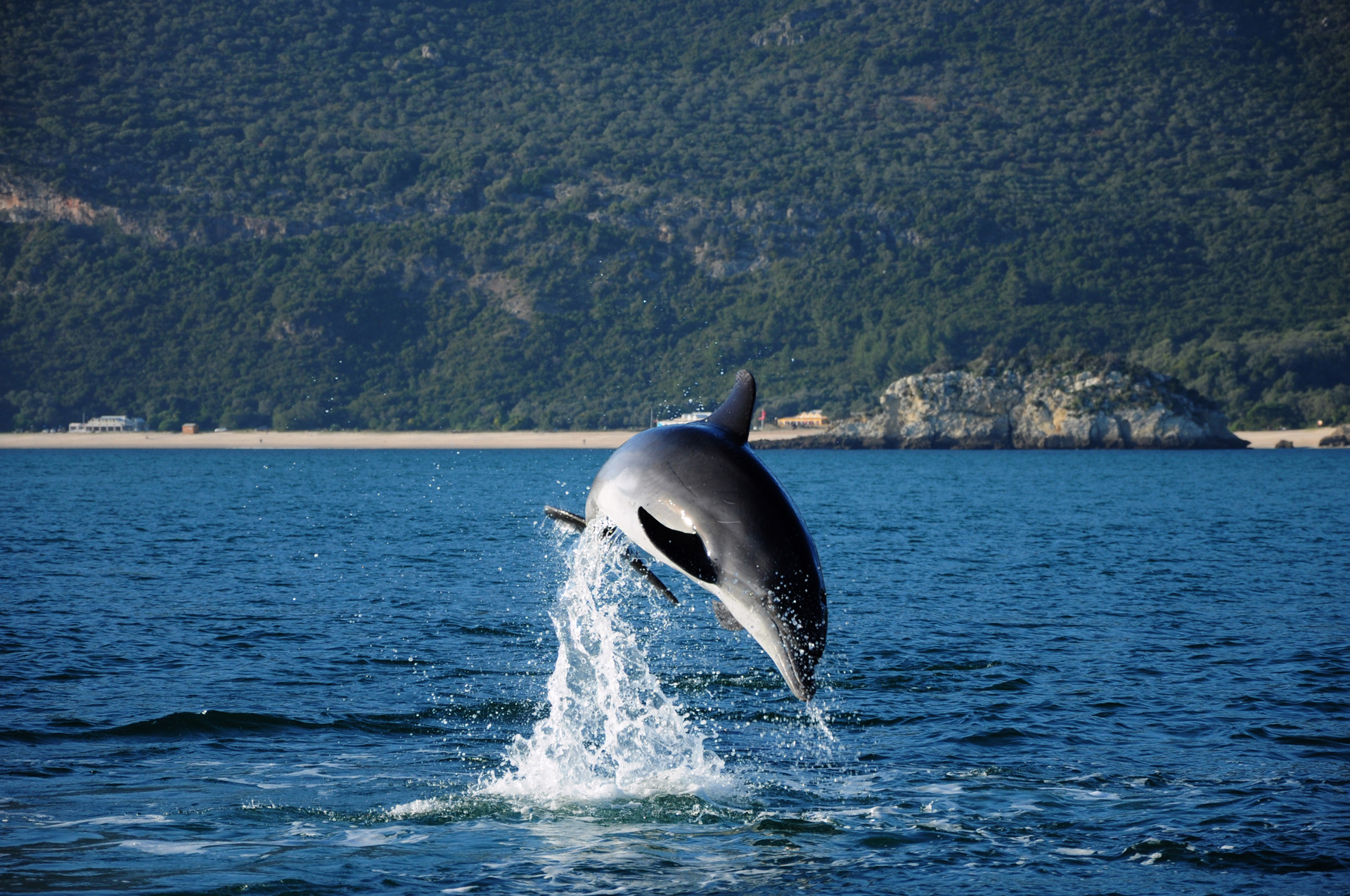
Bottlenose dolphin in the Sado River estuary

Between 2004 and 2010 she worked with the Associação Viver a Ciência (Living Science Association) on science communication. In 2015, she was one of the founding members of the Ocean Alive NGO, which aims to promote the preservation of seagrass beds and the oceans by developing educational, awareness-building and monitoring campaigns in which women from fishing communities actively participate. It also generates additional incomes. These women were called Guardians of the Sea (Guardiãs do Mar). For this project, she received a grant from the National Geographic Society to map the seagrass meadows.

Gaspar has also used storytelling to encourage teachers and young people to become involved in ocean protection. She has written two children's books about marine life.

== Recognitions and awards ==
- 2015 - Gaspar was awarded an Ariane de Rothschild fellowship.
- 2016 - With the Guardiãs do Mar project, she won the FAZ Prize – Ideas of Portuguese Origin, awarded by the Calouste Gulbenkian Foundation, which was presented to her by the Portuguese president Marcelo Rebelo de Sousa.
- 2017 - Gaspar received the Terre des Femmes prize awarded by the Yves Rocher Foundation.
- 2019 – She received the scientific merit medal from the Portuguese Ministry of Science, Technology and Higher Education.
- 2019 - The Most Beautiful Bays in the World club awarded her a merit scholarship.
- 2019 – She was named as a National Geographic Explorer.

== Publications ==
- 2003 - Status of resident bottlenose dolphin population in the Sado estuary (PhD. thesis).
- 2009 - The sea girl's friends, with illustrations by Ângelo Encarnação. Associação Viver a Ciência, ISBN 978-989-96453-0-1.
- 2012 - Stories of bottlenose dolphins from Sado, with illustrations by Marcos Oliveira. Associação Viver a Ciência, ISBN 978-989-96453-1-8.
