= Mary E. Williamson =

American aviator

Mary E. (Ellen) Williamson (April 24, 1924 – December 3, 2012) was an American aviator who served as a WASP (Women Airforce Service Pilots) during World War II. She was also a communications professor at the University of Nebraska Omaha.

== Early life, education and military service ==
Mary E. Williamson was born on April 24, 1924, in Kansas City, Missouri, to Elmer C. Williamson and Ruth Peterman Williamson. She was an only child, whom her mother raised on her own. The two remained very close throughout her life.

Williamson attended Baker University after high school in 1941, but soon transferred to the Missouri School of Journalism at the University of Missouri in Columbia.

She finished this two-year program quickly and left for Sweetwater, Texas, in April 1944 to train as a pilot in the WASP (Women Air Force Service Pilots) program. She served from April 1 to September 1, 1944, but never served on a mission before the war came to an end.

== Career ==
After her discharge, Williamson returned to Kansas City and acquired a job as the public relations director for the Kansas City Tuberculosis Society. Through this position, she was offered an opportunity to further her education, and eventually obtained her master's degree from Columbia University in New York.

After graduating, she moved to Washington D.C., and took a job as an editor. However, wanting to be closer to her home, she returned to St. Louis and accepted a position in broadcasting.

Williamson began teaching in the Department of Speech and Mass communication at the University of Nebraska Omaha (UNO) in 1969. In her first year, she taught courses such as Speech 101, Introduction to Mass Communications, Television Production and Radio Production. She also served as PanHellenic advisor to the Greek communities on campus.

Williamson finished her doctoral program in 1973 with the publication of her thesis "An Inquiry into Excellence in Commercial Broadcasting". She incorporated work experience with the Nebraska Business Development Center (NBDC) in many of her courses, so that students were able to provide services and advice to small business owners in the Omaha area.

Throughout her time at UNO, Williamson served in various roles across campus. She was elected to Faculty Senate, and served her second term as vice president in 1977 and as president in 1978. During this service, she successfully removed gendered language from UNO's diploma despite some strong opposition.

Williamson served as the executive assistant to UNO Chancellor Del Weber from 1980 until 1986. Also during this time, she was appointed interim dean for the College of Fine Arts for two years, and later as the Interim University Relations director, where she was responsible for public outreach for the university. After her interim stints in both departments, Williamson returned to the Communications Department as acting department chair. She took partial retirement shortly after, and began working closely with NBDC as a business consultant.

Williamson retired in 2004 after 35 years of teaching at UNO.

In 1981, she became an associate of the Women's Institute for Freedom of the Press (WIFP). WIFP is an American nonprofit publishing organization which works to increase communication between women and connect the public with forms of women-based media.

== Community service ==
Williamson also worked as the vice president of Nebraska Cable Television, and was later appointed by the mayor of Omaha to the community's Cable Television Advisory Committee for two terms.

After retirement, she volunteered for various organizations. She served as an ombudsman at the Ambassador Rehabilitation Center, and a counselor at the Service Corps of Retired Executives (SCORE), and assisted the Hearts United for Animals shelter.

== Awards ==
Williamson received recognition for her service to the Faculty Senate in the 1970s and a certificate from the University of Nebraska Board of Regents in 1982 for her dedication to improving UNO. NBDC presented Williamson with the UNO Small Business Institute Award in 1987 and 1990, and then an award for her contribution to the Nebraska Small Business Community in 1992. Chancellor Nancy Belck presented Williamson with a plaque recognizing her service and devotion to UNO upon retirement. In 2007, the United Way of Midlands honored Williamson for her services and time. She also received a certificate from her time as ombudsman at the Ambassador Rehabilitation Center.

In 2010, at the age of 86, Williamson was awarded the Congressional Gold Medal for her service as a Women Airforce Service Pilot (WASP) in Washington, D.C.

== Death ==
Williamson died on December 3, 2012, at age 88.
