= Flora Crater =

Virginia politician (1914–2009)

Flora Marina Trimmer Crater
- Born: April 19, 1914; Costa Rica
- Died: February 1, 2009 (aged 94)
- Occupation: Politician

Flora Crater (April 19, 1914 – February 1, 2009) was a Virginia politician, lobbyist, and activist. Her causes included women's rights, school integration, collective bargaining, and minority rights. She most famously led the Virginia lobby for the Equal Rights Amendment and was the first president of the Virginia chapter of the National Organization for Women. She was the first woman to run for statewide office in Virginia.

== Personal life ==
Flora Marina Trimmer was born on April 19, 1914, in Costa Rica. She was the daughter of a Nicaraguan mother and an American father, and later described her upbringing as very traditional. After living in Cuba, New York City, and Washington, D.C., the family moved to Orange, Virginia, when Crater was a child. She graduated from Orange High School and moved to Washington, D.C. where she married Walter James Crater (d. 1982). They had three children.

== Education ==
As a young woman, Crater attended Strayer College in Washington, D.C., but did not graduate. At the age of 67 she received her bachelor's degree from George Mason University.

== Career ==
Flora Crater engaged in politics to fight for women, African Americans, the poor and young people. She first became involved in politics in 1942, when as a member of her children's Parent-Teacher Association, she advocated for educational issues in Fairfax County. In particular, she lobbied against the policies of Wallace Carper, chairman of the Fairfax County Board of Supervisors, a Democrat aligned with Harry F. Byrd Jr. In 1945, Crater supported Ed Lynch's successful campaign against Carper to represent Fairfax County in the General Assembly. In the 1950s and 1960s, Crater was active in Democratic leadership in Fairfax and Virginia's 10th congressional district, in an era when the party was struggling with internal conflicts over major issues such as Massive Resistance. She worked in a number of positions in the Fairfax Democratic Committee and served as a precinct chair for Joseph H. Freehill's unsuccessful 1958 campaign for Congress and as Fairfax County chair for William C. Battle's unsuccessful gubernatorial campaign in 1968.

In 1966, Crater ran for office for the first time, seeking a seat on the Fairfax County Board of Supervisors, but was not elected in her heavily Republican district. The same year, Crater was appointed to the newly created Fairfax Redevelopment and Housing Authority, an organization that sought to provide low-income housing in the suburban county. Under her leadership, the Authority created 150 low-income-housing units, but Crater resigned when the organization came under scrutiny for poor financial management, and soon turned her attention to feminism.

=== Women's rights ===
In 1970, Crater's daughter-in-law, Frances Mae Kubitz Crater, a member of the National Organization for Women in New Jersey, asked Crater to help her arrange a meeting with her senator to discuss the Equal Rights Amendment. Inspired by what she learned during this experience, Crater founded the Northern Virginia Chapter of NOW and began holding meetings in her home, combining political strategy sessions, protest planning, and consciousness raising. She moved swiftly into a leadership position, becoming chair of NOW's Ad Hoc Committee on the Equal Rights Amendment, which was bolstered by the support of more than 25 political, religious, and labor organizations. In 1971, she became head of the Virginia chapter of the National Women's Political Caucus, an organization that sought to increase the representation of women in politics.

On August 26, 1970, Crater attended the Women's Strike for Equality in Washington, D.C. As a representative of NOW, she presented a petition and two pink paper flowers to Senate leaders, urging passage of the ERA. The flowers were to become a familiar sight at Washington ERA events in the years to come, symbolizing Crater's first name, as well as the women she represented.

In 1971, Crater started publishing "The Woman Activist", an action letter that reached a national readership, sharing information about feminist issues. It contained advice for feminists on how to lobby, campaign, and perform other political activities, as well as groundbreaking analyses of national politics. For instance, The New York Times published an article in 1972 summarizing the newsletter's findings on House votes on feminist issues, breaking down the votes on gender and race lines.

After the passage of the Equal Rights Amendment by Congress, Crater lobbied for its ratification by the states, and specifically Virginia.

Crater convened the Virginia Equal Rights Amendment Ratification Council, which brought together more than thirty organizations to fight for the ERA.

In 1977 Crater became an associate of the Women's Institute for Freedom of the Press.

==== "Crater's Raiders" ====
Crater led a group of lobbyists, made up mostly of NOW members, who were instrumental in pushing the U.S. Congress's passage of the Equal Rights Amendment in 1972, and which led the fight for the passage of the ERA in Virginia from that point on. They were retroactively dubbed "Crater's Raiders", and were known for handing out pink paper flowers, in reference to Crater's first name.

=== Campaigns for political office ===
- In 1973, Crater ran unsuccessfully for Lieutenant Governor of Virginia, with the goal of gaining visibility for women's rights. She ran as an independent candidate and received 10.51 percent of the votes, mostly from Democrats and women, and running second ahead of Democrat James Harry Michael Jr. in Williamsburg City. She was the first woman to run for statewide office in Virginia.
- In 1978, Crater sought the Democratic nomination for United States senator from Virginia. She received only two delegates.

== Archives ==
Flora Crater's papers, which run to more than 260 boxes, are held at the Albert and Shirley Small Special Collections Library at the University of Virginia.

Records of the Virginia Equal Rights Amendment Ratification Council are held at the Library of Virginia.
