= Thelma Dailey-Stout =

- Born: 14 March 1918; Baltimore, MD
- Died: 1 July 2005 (aged 87); New York City, NY
- Occupation: Civil rights activist

Thelma Dailey-Stout (1918 – 2005) was an African American and Native American civil rights activist known for founding the magazine The Ethnic Woman (1977). She was active in the labor movement in New York City in the 1970s and was a member of many civil rights organizations throughout her lifetime.

== Biography ==
=== Early life ===
Dailey-Stout was born Thelma Jennings in Baltimore, Maryland in 1918.

She received a B.A. from Empire State College and a Fellowship in women's studies at Sarah Lawrence College.

She had one biological daughter, but she nurtured several other sons and daughters.

Dailey-Stout died July 1, 2005.

== The Ethnic Woman ==
In 1977, Dailey-Stout founded The Ethnic Woman magazine. This magazine was created by and targeted towards women of "African, Latin, American Indian, and Asian heritage," to share their collective knowledge and create connections.

== Civil rights activism ==
Dailey-Stout was an active participant in labor movements in New York in the 1970s.

Dailey-Stout, the first Black woman vice president of District 65 of the Distributive Workers Union, was ousted from her position in 1976. A newspaper reported that it was due to her age. They blamed the union's white president at the time, David Livingston, and the union's "30 years and out" retirement policy. Dailey-Stout sued the organization and its officers for age, sex, and race discrimination, but lost her case.

Dailey-Stout was Founder and President of Trade Union Women of African Heritage.

She was a member of the Ethel Payne Institute of Political Education for Black Women, associate for the Women's Institute for Freedom of the Press, and Treasurer of Black Forum in 1977.

She was very active in other organizations, including Coalition of 100 Black Women, Congress of Racial Equality, and International Organization of Journalists. Other organizations include: board member of National Congress of Neighborhood Women, Inc.; Women's Forum International; coordinator of the Bronx Chapter of the United Nations Association; Multi-Ethnic Woman Workshop at the Fashion Institute of Technology; IWY Tribune; Veteran feminists of America from 1992.
