= Judge Michael =

Judge Michael may refer to:

- James Harry Michael Jr. (1918–2005), judge of the United States District Court for the Western District of Virginia
- M. Blane Michael (1943–2011), judge of the United States Court of Appeals for the Fourth Circuit
