= Lana Rakow =

American academic administrator (born 1952)

- Born: April 17, 1952 (age 74)

Academic background
- Education: University of North Dakota

Lana F. Rakow (born April 17, 1952) is a professor emerita of communication at the University of North Dakota and author of Gender on the Line: Women, the Telephone, and Community Life (1992). In 2000, she was identified as a top woman scholar in journalism and mass communication, and her research results were reported by the Association for Education in Journalism and Mass Communication on the Status of Women. She also has numerous other published works that are primarily in the fields of communication and feminist theory.

Rakow was born in North Dakota, where she spent a majority of her life as a student and, later, as a professor, writer, and researcher. As of June 2016, Rakow is in retirement from her position at University of North Dakota. She is currently the Associate Editor of the Journalism and Mass Communication Quarterly. Rakow has continued to research, write, and travel in her retirement.

== Education and career ==
Rakow began her secondary education in her home state at the University of North Dakota. There, she graduated in 1974 with degrees in both Journalism and Humanities. She pursued her master's degree at UND as well, earning a degree in American Literature with a minor in English Language in 1977. During this time, she taught as a graduate assistant within the English department.

From 1981 – 1985, Rakow taught first as an assistant professor of Journalism at Franklin College in Indiana and then as a graduate assistant in the College of Communications at the University of Illinois, Urbana-Champaign. She later earned her Ph.D at the latter school in Communication Cultural Studies in 1987.

Rakow's long-term career as a professor and researcher began at the University of Wisconsin-Parkside where she was an assistant professor from 1980 – 1986 and an associate professor from 1990 – 1994 in the department of Communication. Finally, she returned to the University of North Dakota, where she taught Communications from 1994 until her retirement in 2016. During this time, she also served as the founder and director of the Center for Community Engagement.

In 1984, Rakow became an associate of the Women's Institute for Freedom of the Press (WIFP). WIFP is an American nonprofit publishing organization. The organization works to increase communication between women and connect the public with forms of women-based media.

== Scholarly work ==
The focus of Lana Rakow's research deals largely with subjects such as communication, feminist theory (the extension of feminism into theoretical, fictional, or philosophical discourse.), and technology. One of her major works, Gender on the Line: Women, the Telephone, and Community Life (1992), combines all three of these subjects. Rakow's book, based on her dissertation at the University of Illinois, Urbana-Chaimpaign, looks at the way that women use telephones as a form of communication. Her research, conducted using personal interviews with women in Prospect, Illinois, sheds light on the complexity of women's use of telephones through the feminist perspective. Gender on the Line received the 1993 Book Award from the Organization for the Study of Communication, Language and Gender.

Another one of Rakow's published works that is also written from the feminist perspective is an article titled "Rethinking Gender Research in Communication" from the Journal of Communication. This article, published in 1986, examines how gender has historically been addressed in communication research and combines it with the way feminist theory addresses gender. The point of this particular work from Rakow is to assert that gender research in communication should look at gender as evolving social systems created through communication, rather than as simple categories used to compare communication in men and women. In order to change this thinking and adapt gender research, Rakow argues that other social sciences disciplines and especially feminist theory need to be incorporated in to research in the field of communications.

== Honors and awards ==
- James E. Murphy Memorial Award for Top Faculty Paper, presented by the Cultural and Critical Studies Division for “Who Uses Dewey and Why? Remembering and Forgetting John Dewey in Communication Studies,” at the annual conference of the Association for Education in Journalism and Mass Communication (August 4, 2016)
- Teresa Award for the Advancement of Feminist Scholarship, presented by the Feminist Scholarship Division, International Communication Association, Singapore, June 2010
- Who's Who (Marquis, New Providence, NJ): Who's Who of American Women, 2005, 2006; Who's Who in American Education, 2006, 2007; Who's Who in the World, 2006; Who's Who in America, 2008, 2009, 2010, 2011
- Identified as a top woman scholar in journalism and mass communication. Research results reported in the newsletter of the AEJMC Commission on the Status of Women, 9, no. 2 (Spring/winter 2000)
- Named to the Plaza of Heroines, located at Wichita State University, 1998

== See also ==
- Feminist theory
- Social theory
- Communication theory
- University of North Dakota
