= Barbara Wertheimer =

American historian

Barbara Mayer Wertheimer (1926 – September 23, 1983) was an American historian and labor organizer. Her research specialized in United States labor and gender history.

Wertheimer served as an associate professor at Cornell University from 1977 to 1983, where she cofounded and directed the Institute for Women and Work at the Industrial and Labor Relations School. Wertheimer was also the first president and founding member of the New York Labor History Association, and is known for her monograph We Were There: The Story of Working Women in America (1977).

== Education and civic involvement ==
Born in New York City in 1926, Wertheimer received a Bachelor of Arts from Oberlin College in 1946 and a Master of Arts from New York University in 1960.

Early in her career Wertheimer worked in Pennsylvania as an organizer for the Amalgamated Clothing Workers of America and was an acting national education director from 1947 to 1958. From 1960 to 1961, she served as a consultant for the American Labor Education Service. She was subsequently the community services consultant for the New York State Division of Housing and Community Renewal from 1961 to 1966. Wertheimer was also a past commissioner of the New York City Commission on the Status of Women.

In 1981, Wertheimer became an associate of the Women's Institute for Freedom of the Press (WIFP). WIFP is an American nonprofit publishing organization. The organization works to increase communication between women and connect the public with forms of women-based media.

== Academic career ==
Wertheimer had a long career at Cornell University. From 1966 to 1972 she was the senior extension associate and labor program specialist at the New York State School of Industrial and Labor Relations. From 1972 to 1977, she was the director of the Trade Union Women's Studies program and senior extension associate. She was later an associate professor and director of the Institute for Women and Work from 1977 to 1983.

Wertheimer was a member of the editorial board of Labor History and on the advisory committee for “Twentieth Century Union Woman: Vehicle for Social Change” at the University of Michigan for the National Oral History Project. Wertheimer was also on the advisory committee for documentary Life and Times of Rosie the Riveter.

== Personal ==
Wertheimer was married to Valentin Wertheimer, the vice-president of Amalgamated Clothing Workers. She died of lung cancer at her summer home in Lakeville, Connecticut on September 23, 1983.

== Recognition ==
The Barbara Wertheimer Prize from the New York Labor History Association is named in her honor. It is awarded annually for the best undergraduate research paper in labor and work history.

== Bibliography ==
- Exploring the Arts: Handbook for Trade Union Program Planners (1968)
- Handbook for Consumer Counselors: A Resource and Training Manual (1970)
- Trade Union Women: A Study of Their Participation in New York City Locals (1975)
- We Were There: The Story of Working Women in America (1977)
- Education Needs of Union Women (1982)
