= Frieda Werden =

American and Canadian radio producer (born 1947)

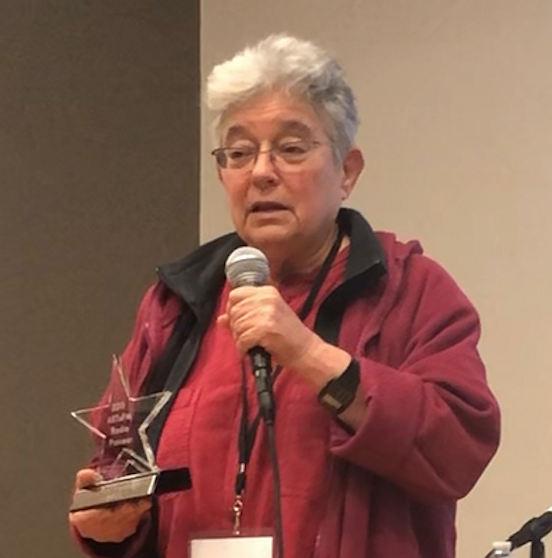
Frieda Werden receives the 2019 Art FM Radio Pioneer Award

Frieda Lindfield Werden (born 1947) is an American and Canadian radio producer. She is the co-founder and producer of the weekly radio series WINGS: Women's International News Gathering Service, which debuted in 1986 and has been in weekly syndication for more than twenty-seven years. Produced by and about women, WINGS broadcasts on non-commercial radio stations worldwide.

== Early life ==
Werden was born Linda Catherine Samfield in Austin, Texas. In 1972, she formally changed her name to Frieda Lindfield Werden. She lived in several other US cities before emigrating to Canada in 2002.

== Work in Media ==
Werden began producing radio with the Longhorn Radio Network in 1973. Her early radio series included Women Today, a show about feminist movements in Texas. In 1975 Werden co-produced a multipart radio series about homosexuality called What’s Normal?.

In 1983, she worked for National Public Radio producing docudramas about various women writers, and, working with Judie Pasternak, formed a women’s news caucus at the National Federation of Community Radio Broadcasters conference.

In 1985, Werden became operations manager of Western Public Radio in San Francisco. There she co-founded WINGS: Women's International News Gathering Service (1986-nowadays) with Katherine Davenport and Augusta Del Zotto, heavily inspired by a newsletter called Media Report to Women which was produced by The Women's Institute for Freedom of the Press. The inaugural WINGS newscast was released in May 1986 with the financial assistance of NPR’s Satellite Program Development Fund. Initially based out of their San Francisco home, Werden moved back to Austin, Texas after Davenport’s passing from Leukemia in 1992.

In 1993, Werden became an associate of the Women's Institute for Freedom of the Press (WIFP). WIFP is an American nonprofit publishing organization. The organization works to increase communication between women and connect the public with forms of women-based media. In the 1990s, she worked with a team of women in Austin, Texas, to produce a cable access television show called Women's News Hour.

From 1993-2002, she worked for Genevieve Vaughan’s Foundation for a Compassionate Society in Austin, Texas, and helped to establish and staff Women's Access to Electronic Resources (WATER). In 1998, in Milan, Werden became North America Representative to the Women's International Network of AMARC (the World Association of Community Radio Broadcasters). As such, she represented AMARC on the Task Force on Gender Issues of the International Telecommunication Union (ITU) in Geneva.

In 2005, Werden was elected president of the International Association of Women in Radio and Television. From 2002-2007, she served as Vice President for North America on the international Board of Directors of (AMARC).

In June 2006, she received the inaugural "Lifetime Achievement Award" at the 25th Annual National Community Radio Conference, a project of the Canadian National Campus and Community Radio Association (NCRA). In 2015, she received a Lifetime Achievement Award from the International Association of Women in Radio and TV.

Werden held the position of Spoken Word Coordinator at CJSF-FM, Simon Fraser University’s campus-community radio station in Burnaby, BC, from 2002 to May 2014.

On Oct. 6, 2019, she received the 2019 Art FM Radio Pioneer Award at the end of the Grassroots Radio Conference, from ARTxFM / WXOX in Louisville, Kentucky.
