= 1973 Virginia lieutenant gubernatorial election =

- November 6, 1973
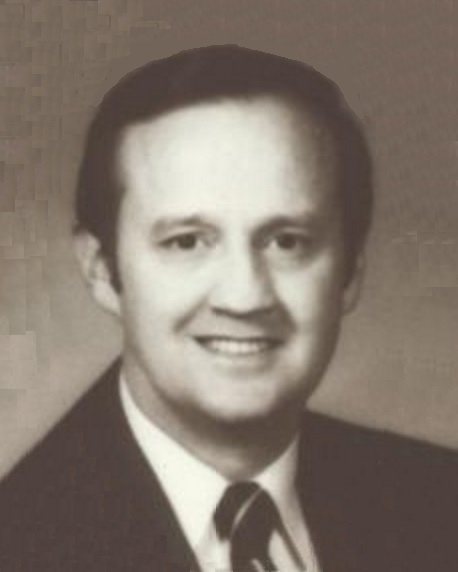

Nominee	John N. Dalton	James Harry Michael Jr.	Flora Crater
Party	Republican	Democratic	Independent
Popular vote	505,729	332,990	98,508
Percentage	53.96%	35.53%	10.51%
- County and independent city results Dalton: 40–50% 50–60% 60–70% 70–80% Michael: 40–50% 50–60% 60–70%
Lieutenant Governor before election
Henry Howell
Independent
Elected Lieutenant Governor
John N. Dalton
Republican

The 1973 Virginia lieutenant gubernatorial election was held on November 6, 1973. Republican nominee John N. Dalton defeated Democratic nominee James Harry Michael Jr. with 53.96 percent of the vote. This was the last time until 1997 that a Republican was elected lieutenant governor of Virginia.

== Background ==
Following the death from a brain tumor of J. Sargeant Reynolds, universally viewed as favorite to be Democratic gubernatorial nominee for 1973, the lieutenant gubernatorial seat went in a 1971 special election to the fiery populist independent Henry Evans Howell, who had lost the Democratic gubernatorial primary in 1969 and did not believe himself likely to win the party nomination again. Howell, however, was always seeking the governor's office for 1973, against the opposition of former Democratic governor Mills Godwin and the old-line business and political establishment, already extremely worried by his win in the 1971 lieutenant gubernatorial special election.

== Nominations ==
The race to oppose the sitting lieutenant governor became so divisive that the Democratic Party eventually did not nominate a candidate for Governor, instead supporting Howell's independent run. Fifty-four-year-old State Senator James Harry Michael of Charlottesville was established as the only Democratic lieutenant gubernatorial candidate in early April, and was fully confirmed as the nominee mid-month. Michael, a moderate, would refuse to endorse either Howell or his archenemy Godwin, who would confirm his shift to the Republican Party in June.

The Republican nomination was early on a race between John Dalton, nephew and adopted son of 1953 and 1957 gubernatorial nominee Theodore of the mountain-valley Holton faction, and forces led by the much more conservative Richard Obershain of Richmond. After a week, Obershain announced he would not run, and Dalton thus emerged as the favorite against Delegate Herbert Morgan of Arlington. He would easily win the nominee in a convention during the second week of June.

An independent nominee, long-time lobbyist (Note: Crater had lobbied to save public schools in Virginia, for reforms in Fairfax County government, and was at the time of her candidacy lobbying for the Equal Rights Amendment.) and journalist Flora Crater of Falls Church, would declare in April and be confirmed by June. A strongly liberal former Democrat and a delegate to the previous year's party convention, Crater said she entered when Virginia failed to ratify the Equal Rights Amendment.

== Campaign ==
All three candidates kept their campaigns separate from the concurrent gubernatorial battle. Dalton campaigned solidly from July, and was a clear favorite early on, although by September polls saw Michael catching up. The lack of major issues for the campaign, however, handicapped Michael, as did the fact that there was no party man at the top of the ticket. Efforts by Michael to campaign upon his support for news sales tax exemptions on food and medicine, and on his ability to work with any Governor, did not substantially effect polling. Crater, supported mainly by the Virginia Women's Political Caucus, ran a low-budget campaign that attracted considerable attention due to her positions on controversial issues such as public financing of state campaigns, negotiated wages for Virginia teachers, the ERA and her support for a master plan for land use in the state.

== Polls ==
Source	Ranking	As of
Richmond Times-Dispatch	Likely R	October 4, 1973
The Daily Advance	Likely R	October 6, 1973
Roanoke Times	Likely R	November 1, 1973

== General election ==
=== Candidates ===
==== Major party candidates ====
- John N. Dalton (Republican), State Senator from Emporia City
- James Harry Michael Jr. (Democratic), State Senator from Charlottesville City

==== Other candidates ====
- Flora Crater, (Independent), journalist from Falls Church City

=== Results ===
1973 Virginia lieutenant gubernatorial election
Party	Candidate	Votes	%	±%
Republican	John N. Dalton	505,729	53.96%	
Democratic	James Harry Michael Jr.	332,990	35.53%	
Independent	Flora Crater	98,508	10.51%	
Majority		172,739	18.43%	
Turnout		937,270	28.96%	+3.34%
Republican gain from Independent		Swing		

==== Results by county or independent city ====
1973 Virginia lieutenant gubernatorial election by county or independent city
	John Nichols Dalton Republican		James Harry Michael Jr. Democratic		Flora M. Crater Independent		Various candidates Write-ins		Margin		Total votes cast
	#	%	#	%	#	%	#	%	#	%	Total votes cast
Accomack County	3,322	45.87%	3,709	51.22%	211	2.91%			-387	-5.34%	7,242
Albemarle County	2,389	24.24%	6,234	63.24%	1,234	12.52%			-3,845	-39.01%	9,857
Alleghany County	1,872	63.61%	930	31.60%	141	4.79%			942	32.01%	2,943
Amelia County	1,062	53.13%	862	43.12%	75	3.75%			200	10.01%	1,999
Amherst County	2,394	51.81%	2,055	44.47%	172	3.72%			339	7.34%	4,621
Appomattox County	1,535	65.32%	628	26.72%	187	7.96%			907	38.60%	2,350
Arlington County	16,865	47.43%	12,578	35.37%	6,117	17.20%	1	0.00%	4,287	12.06%	35,561
Augusta County	5,482	66.98%	1,841	22.50%	860	10.51%	1	0.01%	3,641	44.49%	8,184
Bath County	784	60.87%	432	33.54%	72	5.59%			352	27.33%	1,288
Bedford County	2,946	64.20%	1,255	27.35%	387	8.43%	1	0.02%	1,691	36.85%	4,589
Bland County	894	63.58%	478	34.00%	34	2.42%			416	29.59%	1,406
Botetourt County	2,228	58.69%	1,162	30.61%	406	10.70%			1,066	28.08%	3,796
Brunswick County	1,817	47.78%	1,894	49.80%	92	2.42%			-77	-2.02%	3,803
Buchanan County	2,183	40.79%	2,807	52.45%	362	6.76%			-624	-11.66%	5,352
Buckingham County	1,395	49.71%	1,318	46.97%	93	3.31%			77	2.74%	2,806
Campbell County	6,217	72.70%	1,743	20.38%	591	6.91%			4,474	52.32%	8,551
Caroline County	1,149	40.63%	1,508	53.32%	171	6.05%			-359	-12.69%	2,828
Carroll County	2,802	63.99%	1,444	32.98%	133	3.04%			1,358	31.01%	4,379
Charles City County	423	35.85%	673	57.03%	84	7.12%			-250	-21.19%	1,180
Charlotte County	1,892	63.40%	998	33.45%	94	3.15%			894	29.96%	2,984
Chesterfield County	14,800	69.43%	5,085	23.85%	1,432	6.72%			9,715	45.57%	21,317
Clarke County	802	50.50%	631	39.74%	155	9.76%			171	10.77%	1,588
Craig County	462	49.36%	437	46.69%	37	3.95%			25	2.67%	936
Culpeper County	1,931	53.25%	1,369	37.76%	326	8.99%			562	15.50%	3,626
Cumberland County	686	35.79%	1,181	61.61%	50	2.61%			-495	-25.82%	1,917
Dickenson County	2,320	42.78%	2,890	53.29%	213	3.93%			-570	-10.51%	5,423
Dinwiddie County	2,073	49.90%	1,961	47.21%	118	2.84%	2	0.05%	112	2.70%	4,154
Essex County	946	64.31%	463	31.48%	62	4.21%			483	32.83%	1,471
Fairfax County	47,427	51.27%	28,096	30.38%	16,972	18.35%	2	0.00%	19,331	20.90%	92,497
Fauquier County	2,544	61.60%	1,098	26.59%	488	11.82%			1,446	35.01%	4,130
Floyd County	1,312	66.06%	596	30.01%	78	3.93%			716	36.05%	1,986
Fluvanna County	428	28.61%	991	66.24%	77	5.15%			-563	-37.63%	1,496
Franklin County	2,834	56.03%	1,896	37.49%	328	6.48%			938	18.54%	5,058
Frederick County	1,849	42.85%	2,014	46.67%	452	10.48%			-165	-3.82%	4,315
Giles County	2,244	55.49%	1,507	37.27%	293	7.25%			737	18.22%	4,044
Gloucester County	1,907	55.20%	1,206	34.91%	342	9.90%			701	20.29%	3,455
Goochland County	1,243	45.77%	1,353	49.82%	120	4.42%			-110	-4.05%	2,716
Grayson County	1,689	50.71%	1,574	47.25%	68	2.04%			115	3.45%	3,331
Greene County	404	34.98%	618	53.51%	133	11.52%			-214	-18.53%	1,155
Greensville County	958	41.42%	1,251	54.09%	104	4.50%			-293	-12.67%	2,313
Halifax County	2,605	59.38%	1,603	36.54%	179	4.08%			1,002	22.84%	4,387
Hanover County	6,966	63.39%	3,002	27.32%	1,021	9.29%			3,964	36.07%	10,989
Henrico County	30,029	69.82%	9,561	22.23%	3,414	7.94%	3	0.01%	20,468	47.59%	43,007
Henry County	4,190	62.03%	1,733	25.66%	832	12.32%			2,457	36.37%	6,755
Highland County	446	64.92%	218	31.73%	23	3.35%			228	33.19%	687
Isle of Wight County	2,898	59.41%	1,818	37.27%	162	3.32%			1,080	22.14%	4,878
James City County	2,131	56.92%	905	24.17%	708	18.91%			1,226	32.75%	3,744
King George County	785	54.97%	436	30.53%	207	14.50%			349	24.44%	1,428
King and Queen County	507	43.48%	590	50.60%	69	5.92%			-83	-7.12%	1,166
King William County	974	53.22%	760	41.53%	96	5.25%			214	11.69%	1,830
Lancaster County	1,723	56.34%	1,243	40.65%	92	3.01%			480	15.70%	3,058
Lee County	2,858	48.92%	2,735	46.82%	249	4.26%			123	2.11%	5,842
Loudoun County	4,327	53.43%	2,959	36.54%	813	10.04%			1,368	16.89%	8,099
Louisa County	1,100	37.87%	1,593	54.84%	211	7.26%	1	0.03%	-493	-16.97%	2,905
Lunenburg County	1,584	63.26%	847	33.83%	73	2.92%			737	29.43%	2,504
Madison County	727	39.23%	923	49.81%	203	10.96%			-196	-10.58%	1,853
Mathews County	1,400	60.22%	816	35.10%	109	4.69%			584	25.12%	2,325
Mecklenburg County	3,459	59.72%	2,161	37.31%	172	2.97%			1,298	22.41%	5,792
Middlesex County	914	53.14%	699	40.64%	107	6.22%			215	12.50%	1,720
Montgomery County	6,405	65.94%	2,384	24.54%	924	9.51%			4,021	41.40%	9,713
Nelson County	648	31.43%	1,315	63.77%	98	4.75%	1	0.05%	-667	-32.35%	2,062
New Kent County	777	54.45%	564	39.52%	86	6.03%			213	14.93%	1,427
Northampton County	1,846	50.97%	1,638	45.22%	138	3.81%			208	5.74%	3,622
Northumberland County	1,478	60.75%	869	35.72%	85	3.49%	1	0.04%	609	25.03%	2,433
Nottoway County	2,165	57.70%	1,514	40.35%	73	1.95%			651	17.35%	3,752
Orange County	992	39.44%	1,032	41.03%	491	19.52%			-40	-1.59%	2,515
Page County	1,876	57.00%	1,258	38.23%	157	4.77%			618	18.78%	3,291
Patrick County	1,123	54.94%	735	35.96%	186	9.10%			388	18.98%	2,044
Pittsylvania County	5,511	58.05%	3,516	37.03%	466	4.91%	1	0.01%	1,995	21.01%	9,494
Powhatan County	1,025	51.72%	876	44.20%	81	4.09%			149	7.52%	1,982
Prince Edward County	2,008	58.34%	1,096	31.84%	338	9.82%			912	26.50%	3,442
Prince George County	1,222	47.70%	1,186	46.29%	154	6.01%			36	1.41%	2,562
Prince William County	7,717	55.45%	3,251	23.36%	2,947	21.18%	1	0.01%	4,466	32.09%	13,916
Pulaski County	4,061	64.61%	1,841	29.29%	383	6.09%			2,220	35.32%	6,285
Rappahannock County	538	53.80%	378	37.80%	84	8.40%			160	16.00%	1,000
Richmond County	1,021	61.40%	577	34.70%	63	3.79%	2	0.12%	444	26.70%	1,663
Roanoke County	10,569	61.24%	5,235	30.33%	1,451	8.41%	3	0.02%	5,334	30.91%	17,258
Rockbridge County	1,705	60.87%	822	29.35%	274	9.78%			883	31.52%	2,801
Rockingham County	6,792	70.39%	1,936	20.06%	919	9.52%	2	0.02%	4,856	50.33%	9,649
Russell County	3,281	46.72%	3,402	48.45%	339	4.83%			-121	-1.72%	7,022
Scott County	2,717	51.01%	2,284	42.88%	325	6.10%			433	8.13%	5,326
Shenandoah County	3,795	64.79%	1,696	28.96%	366	6.25%			2,099	35.84%	5,857
Smyth County	2,970	51.64%	2,214	38.50%	567	9.86%			756	13.15%	5,751
Southampton County	2,244	57.55%	1,498	38.42%	157	4.03%			746	19.13%	3,899
Spotsylvania County	1,665	48.98%	1,312	38.60%	422	12.42%			353	10.39%	3,399
Stafford County	2,008	47.87%	1,662	39.62%	525	12.51%			346	8.25%	4,195
Surry County	790	52.32%	627	41.52%	93	6.16%			163	10.79%	1,510
Sussex County	1,442	46.22%	1,452	46.54%	226	7.24%			-10	-0.32%	3,120
Tazewell County	3,466	51.61%	2,410	35.88%	840	12.51%			1,056	15.72%	6,716
Warren County	1,438	44.37%	1,369	42.24%	434	13.39%			69	2.13%	3,241
Washington County	3,708	49.61%	3,104	41.53%	663	8.87%			604	8.08%	7,475
Westmoreland County	1,286	58.67%	661	30.16%	245	11.18%			625	28.51%	2,192
Wise County	2,745	37.50%	3,959	54.08%	616	8.42%			-1,214	-16.58%	7,320
Wythe County	2,680	60.39%	1,544	34.79%	214	4.82%			1,136	25.60%	4,438
York County	4,241	58.42%	2,098	28.90%	921	12.69%			2,143	29.52%	7,260
Alexandria City	7,722	44.68%	5,907	34.18%	3,650	21.12%	2	0.01%	1,815	10.50%	17,281
Bedford City	863	61.51%	443	31.58%	97	6.91%			420	29.94%	1,403
Bristol City	883	44.28%	1,000	50.15%	111	5.57%			-117	-5.87%	1,994
Buena Vista City	650	60.63%	353	32.93%	69	6.44%			297	27.71%	1,072
Charlottesville City	1,779	18.37%	6,518	67.32%	1,385	14.30%			-4,739	-48.95%	9,682
Chesapeake City	8,592	48.13%	6,597	36.95%	2,664	14.92%			1,995	11.17%	17,853
Clifton Forge City	823	62.49%	412	31.28%	82	6.23%			411	31.21%	1,317
Colonial Heights City	2,569	65.96%	953	24.47%	373	9.58%			1,616	41.49%	3,895
Covington City	1,317	62.18%	631	29.79%	170	8.03%			686	32.39%	2,118
Danville City	5,909	67.89%	2,141	24.60%	654	7.51%			3,768	43.29%	8,704
Emporia City	840	56.80%	605	40.91%	34	2.30%			235	15.89%	1,479
Fairfax City	2,086	51.96%	1,143	28.47%	786	19.58%			943	23.49%	4,015
Falls Church City	1,196	43.11%	1,057	38.10%	521	18.78%			139	5.01%	2,774
Franklin City	945	59.25%	572	35.86%	78	4.89%			373	23.39%	1,595
Fredericksburg City	1,352	47.34%	976	34.17%	527	18.45%	1	0.04%	376	13.17%	2,856
Galax City	793	57.67%	560	40.73%	22	1.60%			233	16.95%	1,375
Hampton City	10,617	56.58%	4,889	26.05%	3,259	17.37%			5,728	30.52%	18,765
Harrisonburg City	2,636	71.65%	634	17.23%	409	11.12%			2,002	54.42%	3,679
Hopewell City	2,569	55.31%	1,606	34.57%	469	10.10%	1	0.02%	963	20.73%	4,645
Lexington City	875	60.68%	439	30.44%	128	8.88%			436	30.24%	1,442
Lynchburg City	7,594	68.82%	2,689	24.37%	751	6.81%			4,905	44.45%	11,034
Martinsville City	2,346	71.00%	666	20.16%	292	8.84%			1,680	50.85%	3,304
Nansemond City	3,842	48.77%	3,610	45.82%	425	5.39%	1	0.01%	232	2.94%	7,878
Newport News City	12,368	48.93%	10,235	40.49%	2,674	10.58%	1	0.00%	2,133	8.44%	25,278
Norfolk City	18,712	44.20%	17,613	41.60%	6,010	14.20%			1,099	2.60%	42,335
Norton City	411	43.26%	418	44.00%	121	12.74%			-7	-0.74%	950
Petersburg City	3,819	44.86%	4,232	49.71%	451	5.30%	11	0.13%	-413	-4.85%	8,513
Portsmouth City	10,482	47.67%	10,032	45.63%	1,473	6.70%			450	2.05%	21,987
Radford City	2,115	68.05%	843	27.12%	150	4.83%			1,272	40.93%	3,108
Richmond City	25,525	47.92%	24,070	45.19%	3,671	6.89%	3	0.01%	1,455	2.73%	53,269
Roanoke City	9,617	55.32%	6,610	38.02%	1,158	6.66%			3,007	17.30%	17,385
Salem City	3,161	63.85%	1,397	28.22%	393	7.94%			1,764	35.63%	4,951
South Boston City	1,005	67.13%	433	28.92%	59	3.94%			572	38.21%	1,497
Staunton City	3,201	65.13%	1,235	25.13%	479	9.75%			1,966	40.00%	4,915
Suffolk City	1,540	63.82%	755	31.29%	118	4.89%			785	32.53%	2,413
Virginia Beach City	20,971	60.37%	8,722	25.11%	5,042	14.52%	1	0.00%	12,249	35.26%	34,736
Waynesboro City	2,753	66.47%	973	23.49%	416	10.04%			1,780	42.97%	4,142
Williamsburg City	1,247	58.03%	433	20.15%	469	21.82%			778 (Note: In this county or city where Crater ran second ahead of Michael, margin given is Dalton vote minus Crater vote and percentage margin Dalton percentage minus Crater percentage.)	36.20%	2,149
Winchester City	1,916	45.25%	1,905	44.99%	413	9.75%			11	0.26%	4,234
Totals	505,729	53.96%	332,990	35.53%	98,508	10.51%	43	0.00%	172,739	18.43%	937,270

== Analysis ==
As generally expected in the months preceding the election, Dalton won a convincing victory by 18.43 percentage points, sufficient that he would have won clearly without the Crater candidacy that was expected to hurt Michael. Dalton carried all except twenty-one counties and all except four cities, including longtime Democratic strongholds like Norfolk, Portsmouth and Richmond, whilst Michael's strength was largely confined to his home area around Charlottesville and a few coal counties in the southwest. Crater won about twice the generally predicted vote percentage, doing best in her Northern Virginia home and in the Tidewater, where she ran second ahead of Michael in Williamsburg.
