= Joy Simonson =

American women's rights activist

Joy Rosenheim Simonso
- Born: January 16, 1919
- Died: June 24, 2007 (aged 88)
- Occupation: Feminist

Joy Rosenheim Simonson (January 16, 1919 – June 24, 2007) was a feminist who worked on women's rights and progressive activist.

== Career ==
A New York City native and graduate of Bryn Mawr College, Simonson began her career in the 1940s for the War Manpower Commission.

In 1945, she worked for the U. N. Relief and Rehabilitation Administration in Egypt and Yugoslavia at the end of the war, then as a civilian for Army headquarters in Frankfurt, Germany, until 1948, when she and her husband returned to Washington.

She was a member of the national commission on the International Women's Year and was a delegate from Washington to the 1977 National Women's Conference in Houston. She also attended the U.N. women's conferences in Copenhagen in 1980 and Nairobi in 1985.

From 1975 to 1982, Simonson was the executive director of the National Advisory Council on Women's Educational Programs. Under Simonson's leadership the Council helped the Department of Education and the Women's Educational Equity Act Program by preparing some of the first reports on women's studies, sexual harassment, and the first edition of the Handbook for Achieving Sex Equity through Education. With the election of Ronald Reagan, however, she was fired and replaced by a member of Phyllis Schlafly's Eagle Forum.

in 1977, Simonson became an associate of the Women's Institute for Freedom of the Press (WIFP). WIFP is an American nonprofit publishing organization. The organization works to increase communication between women and connect the public with forms of women-based media.

Simonson was the first woman to serve as chair of the DC Alcoholic Beverage Control Board; President of the Clearinghouse on Women's Issues; chief hearing examiner for the D.C. Rent Commission; Assistant Director of the Federal Women's Program of the U.S. Civil Service Commission; president of the D.C. League of Women Voters; vice president of Executive Women in Government; and was the founder of the D.C. Commission for Women.

From 1982 to 1990, Simonson worked as an oversight investigator for the House Employment and Housing Subcommittee. In 1992, she was elected to the District of Columbia Women's Hall of Fame. She received the Foremother Award from the National Center for Health Research in 2005.

== Death ==
She died on June 24, 2007, aged 88, from complications of pneumonia at the Washington Home hospice, survived by three children. She was predeceased by her husband, Richard Simonson.
