= Women's Institute for Freedom of the Press =

American nonprofit publishing organization

Women's Institute for Freedom of the Press (WIFP)
- Location: Washington, D.C., United States

Women's Institute for Freedom of the Press (WIFP) is an American nonprofit publishing organization that was founded in Washington, D.C. in 1972. The organization works to increase media democracy and strengthen independent media.

== Basic information ==
WIFP was founded in 1972 by Donna Allen in Washington, DC. She was an economist, historian, and civil rights activist. The organization conducted seven conferences at the National Press Club in the 1970s and 1980s on "Planning a National and International Communications System for Women". WIFP held two international satellite teleconferences from the 1975 UN World Conference of Women, in Copenhagen in 1980 ("Dateline Copenhagen: A Woman's View") and Nairobi in 1985 ("Dateline Nairobi - Woman's View"). These were each four hours if international interactions between women. During the 1980 conference, women gathered in six US cities and several female delegates from other countries called in from the Second U.N. World Conference in Copenhagen. Five years later in Nairobi, groups of women came together similarly to in Copenhagen but with the addition of more countries and their delegates. As of 2017, WIFP became a member of Corporate Reform Coalition, which is a group of organizations and individuals who join together to address the influence of corporate America on the country's elections through shareholder protection.

== Publications ==
When the Institute was founded, it immediately launched the periodical Media Report to Women with the subhead "What Women Are Doing and Thinking About the Communications Media." It was edited the first fifteen years by Donna Allen. Media Report to Women was transferred in mid-1987 to Communication Research Association Inc., where it is still published. WIFP currently publishes two annual print periodicals: Voices for Media Democracy and the Directory of Women's Media. The first version of the Directory was published in 1975, and had 154 women's periodicals. Out of these 154, there were 24 periodicals that were published outside of the United States. Fourteen years later, the Directory contained 702 publications with 300 published outside of the United States.

== Issued awards ==
=== Women and Media Award ===
WIFP began an annual award entitled "Women and Media Award" in 2013. It which is given to women who have made exceptional contributions toward expanding female voices in the media. The recipients of this award are:

- 2012 – Maurine Beasley
- 2014 – Tobe Levin
- 2015 – Roxanne Dunbar
- 2016 – Soraya Chemaly
- 2017 – Vinie Burrows
- 2018 – Angela Peabody
- 2019 - Luci Murphy
- 2020 - Esther Iverem, Eleanor Goldfield, Medea Benjamin, Margaret Flowers, Alina Duarte, and Anya Parampil
- 2021 - Margaret Kimberley, Laura Flanders, Jennifer Pozner, Barbara Ransby, Nayoung Kim Park, and Carolyn LaDelle Bennett

== Staff and Associates ==
=== Staff ===
==== President ====
Dana Densmore first became a board member and officer of WIFP when the organization was founded in 1972. During her time at the organization, she served as senior editor and research director. In 1968, when the women's liberation bloomed, Densmore had been a systems programmer at the Massachusetts Institute of Technology. As an outcome, she worked with Roxanne Dunbar to found the feminist organization Cell 16. The two women went on to found the journal No More Fun and Games as the organization's periodical in the same year. She is also the founder, co-director, and editor for Green Lion Press. She received her B.A. in 1965 from St. John's College in Annapolis and her M.A. in 1993 from St. John's College in Santa Fe.

==== Director ====
Martha Leslie Allen has been the institute's director since 1985. She is an activist for media democracy and the promotion of women's involvement in the media. In 1973–1975 she founded and chaired Women's Media Project in Memphis, Tennessee. Additionally, she was an organizer of the 1973 Women's Leadership Conference in Memphis. From 1978 to 1985, she served as the associate director of WIFP, before taking the director position. Allen earned her Ph.D. in 1988 from Howard University in Washington, DC, with a dissertation on the history of women's media. She is Donna Allen's youngest daughter.

==== Associate director ====
Elana Anderson, with a Ph.D. from Howard University, is on the board of directors of WIFP, as well as serving as the associate director since 2011. Anderson is a native Washingtonian, instructor, lecturer, parent, and performance and fiber artist. She is a member of the American Guild for Musical Artists (AGMA) and the National Council for Negro Women. Anderson serves as an associate artistic team member of Chicago-based Deeply Rooted Productions.

=== Associates ===
In 1977, WIFP formed the Associate Network composed of "women who worked for media or were interested in how the media covered women and their concerns". This network grew to more than 800 members; some of the notable associates are listed below.

- Jennifer Abod
- Caroline Ackerman
- Margie Adam
- Gifty Afenyi-Dadzie
- Dorothy Allison
- Bettina Aptheker
- Alice Backes
- Sandra Bartky
- Jessie Bernard
- Caroline Bird
- Joan Biren
- Anne Braden
- Susan Braudy
- Susan Brownmiller
- Charlotte Bunch
- Martha Burk
- Vinie Burrows
- Urvashi Butalia
- Toni Carabillo
- Jacqueline Ceballos
- Peggy Charren
- Maralyn Chase
- Phyllis Chesler
- Judy Chicago
- Michelle Cliff
- Marjory Collins
- Blanche Wiesen Cook
- Flora Crater
- Mary Daly
- Thelma Dailey-Stout
- Karen DeCrow
- Barbara Deming
- Alix Dobkin
- Ariel Maria Dougherty
- Claudia Dreifus
- Andrea Dworkin
- Mary Eastwood
- Martha Edelheit
- Riane Eisler
- Jo Freeman
- Margaret Gallagher
- Georgie Anne Geyer
- Marcia Ann Gillespie
- Barbara Grier
- Susan Griffin
- Grace Halsell
- Wilma Scott Heide
- Carolyn Heilbrun
- Keiko Higuchi
- Shere Hite
- Victoria Hochberg
- Patricia Hogan
- Michael Honey
- Fran Hosken
- Florence Howe
- Donna Huata
- Perdita Huston
- Mildred Jeffrey
- Mal Johnson
- Sonia Johnson
- Jill Johnston
- Paula Kassell
- Flo Kennedy
- Jean Kilbourne
- Anne Koedt
- Lucy Komisar
- Cheris Kramarae
- Suzanne Lacy
- Louise Lamphere
- Betty Lane
- Laura Lederer
- Rochelle Lefkowtiz
- Dorchen Leidholdt
- Tobe Levin
- Audre Lorde
- Patricia Mainardi
- Tatiana Mamonova
- Del Martin
- Jewell Jackson McCabe
- Sarah McClendon
- Judith Meuli
- Casey Miller
- Susan Miller
- Kate Millett
- Virginia Ramey Mollenkott
- Robin Morgan
- Cindy Nemser
- Ethel Payne
- Ellen Peck
- Eleanor Perry
- Marge Piercy
- Letty Cottin Pogrebin
- Anne Pride
- Lana Rakow
- Frances Reid
- Malvina Reynolds
- Adrienne Rich
- Barbara Rosenthal
- Rosemary Ruether
- Florence Rush
- Diana Russell
- Bernice Sandler
- Doris Evans Saunders
- Ann Scott
- Ntozake Shange
- Gail Sheehy
- Alix Kates Shulman
- Joy Simonson
- Gloria Steinem
- Dorothy Sucher
- Kate Swift
- Irene Tinker
- Emily Toth
- Margaret Traxler
- Carmen Delgado Votaw
- Ellen Wartella
- Naomi Weisstein
- Frieda Werden
- Barbara Wertheimer
- Celeste West
- Mary Williamson
- Betsey Wright
- Laura X
- Judith Zaffirini
