= Ellen Wartella =

American child development scholar

Ellen A. Wartella (born October 16, 1949, in Wilkes-Barre, Pennsylvania) is a leading scholar of the role of media in children's development. She is the chair and professor of communication, director of Northwestern University's Center on Media and Human Development, and an adviser for the review at Northwestern University. She studies social policy, media studies, psychology, and child development at the University. She believes that smartphones are disruptive in a way that's different from earlier technology.

== Biography ==
Ellen A. Wartella is the Sheik Hamad bin Khalifa al Thani Professor of Communication Studies, professor of psychology, of human development, and of behavioral medicine, and director of the Center on Media and Human Development at Northwestern University, where she has worked since 2010. Earlier, she was executive vice chancellor, provost, and distinguished professor of psychology at the University of California, Riverside, from 2004 to 2009. She also served as Dean of the College of Communication at the University of Texas at Austin from 1993 to 2004, where she also held the Walter Cronkite Regents Chair, the Mary Gibbs Jones Centennial Chair, and the UNESCO Chair in International Communication.

== Education ==
Wartella received a B.A. with honors from the University of Pittsburgh in 1971, and M.A. (1974) and Ph.D. (1977) degrees from the University of Minnesota.

== Career ==
Wartella taught at Ohio State University and the University of Illinois at Urbana-Champaign before assuming the Texas deanship.

In 1985, Wartella became an associate of the Women's Institute for Freedom of the Press (WIFP). WIFP is an American nonprofit publishing organization. The organization works to increase communication between women and connect the public with forms of women-based media.

== Publications ==
The author or editor of 14 books and approximately 250 book chapters, research articles, technical reports, and research papers with over 20100 citations, she sits on a variety of national and international advisory boards on children and media, such as the PBS Next Generation advisory board and the board of directors of the World Summit on Children and Media. She is a trustee of Sesame Workshop.

== Policy ==
Wartella has conducted multiple research studies and policy briefs both as a consultant and as a member of study commissions at the National Academy of Sciences and the Institute of Medicine. She has also testified before Congressional committees and made research briefings to Congressional staff and at the White House. Her Center on Media and Human Development holds a policy conference in Washington, DC biennially, where Wartella releases a major national study on a public policy issue regarding children, youth, and technology. This past spring the conference focused on teens, technology and health. Previous conferences examined parenting in the age of digital technology and racial and ethnic differences in children and adolescents' use of media.

== Research ==
Wartella has won research grants from the National Science Foundation (six awards), the Ounce of Prevention Fund, the Hiatt Foundation, the John and Mary Markle Foundation, the National Cable Television Association, the Hogg Foundation, and the Center for Population Options and has served as a consultant to the Robert Wood Johnson Foundation, the Markle Foundation, Microsoft Research, the Federal Trade Commission, the Federal Communications the Children's Television Workshop, and the U.S. Department of Education. She has testified before the U.S. Senate in an inquiry by Sen. Hillary Clinton (D-NY) on a children and media research act, twice before the US House of Representatives Subcommittee on Telecommunications, and before the Federal Trade Commission.

In May 2015, at an education conference in Washington, D.C., Wartella discussed a recent survey she led of about 1,000 preschool teachers, in a sampling that included schools serving a range of socioeconomic levels. The survey was a continuation of a previous one held two years prior to that of the more recent. Wartella revealed that from 2012 to 2014, the number of preschool teachers with tablet computers in their classrooms nearly doubled, rising from 29 to 55 percent. More than half of the teachers with tablets said they used the computers to help teach students while three-quarters of them said they used them for administrative tasks, such as emailing parents. There isn't a consensus on how to use these technologies in preschools, with young children and their developing brains, in developmentally appropriate ways, she said.

After years of researching the use of technology with students, Wartella was intrigued to see how many parents are monitoring their kids' technology use, and the extent to which they place a higher value on security rather than privacy, she said. Wartella's research has shown that children's interest in and use of technology is driven by parents. "The baby isn't going to be asking for the iPad; parents are going to be giving it to him," she said. "That's not to say, however, that a kid who knows his way around an iPhone is necessarily a bad thing. I don't think there's anything morally superior about not having technology in your life," she said. She says that the American Academy of Pediatrics is currently rethinking its current recommendation of a two-hour screen-time limit per day for children over two years old due to the way technology has changed in the last 10 years.

Wartella's studies include data that shows the changing ways that parents are coming to terms with a world where online media is ubiquitous. She was intrigued to see how many parents are monitoring their kids' technology use, and the extent to which they place a higher value on security rather than privacy. Yet, more study is needed to understand this type of addiction and its effects.

== Organization involvement ==
Formerly chair of the Front-of-Package Marketing study committee of the Institute of Medicine for the National Science Foundation, she serves on the National Educational Advisory Board of the Children's Advertising Review Unit of the Council of Better Business Bureaus and is a member of the National Academy of Sciences Board on Children Youth and Families, as well as a Scientific Advisory Board Member of Children and Screens: Institute of Digital Media and Child Development. She recently served on the Institute of Medicine's Panel Study on Food Marketing and the Diets of Children and Youth (2006). During 2006-2007 she was the inaugural fellow of the Fred Rogers Center. A fellow of the American Academy of Arts and Sciences, she is a member of the American Psychological Association, the Society for Research in Child Development and is the past president and fellow of the International Communication Association (ICA). She has received the Aubrey M. Fisher Mentorship Award, the Applied Public Policy Research Award, and the Steven H. Chaffee Career Productivity Award from the ICA, the Distinguished Scholar Award from the National Communication Association, and the Krieghbaum Under 40 Award from the Association for Education in Journalism and Mass Communication.

== Sources ==
- Grossberg, L., Wartella, E., Whitney. D.C., Wise, J.M, (2006) (Second Edition) MediaMaking: Mass Media in a Popular Culture. Thousand Oaks, CA: Sage Publications.
- Pecora, N., Murray, J.P. & Wartella E (Eds.), (2006) Children and television: 50 Years of research. Mahwah, NJ: Lawrence Erlbaum Associates.
- Downing, J., McQuail, D., Schlesinger, P.R., & Wartella, E. (Eds.) (2004). Handbook of Media Studies. Thousand Oaks, CA: Sage Publications.
- Grossberg, L., Wartella, E., & Whitney, D.C. (1998). MediaMaking. Thousand Oaks, CA: Sage Publications.
- Hay, J., Grossberg, L., & Wartella, E. (Eds.). (1996). The Audience and Its Landscape. Boulder, CO: Westview Press.
- Dennis, E. & Wartella, E. (Eds.). (1996). American Communication Research: The Remembered History. Hillsdale, N.J.: Lawrence Erlbaum.
- Dervin, B., Grossberg, L., O’Keefe, B., & Wartella, E. (Eds.). (1989). Rethinking Communication: Paradigm Dialogues. Newbury Park, CA: Sage Publications.
- Dervin, B., Grossberg, L., O’Keefe, B., & Wartella, E. (Eds.). (1989). Rethinking Communication: Paradigm Issues, Volume II. Newbury Park, CA: Sage Publications.
- Whitney, D.C., & Wartella, E. (Eds.). (1983). Mass Communication Review Yearbook, Volume 4. Beverly Hills, CA: Sage Publications.
- Whitney, D.C., & Wartella, E. (Eds.). (1982). Mass Communication Review Yearbook, Volume 3. Beverly Hills, CA: Sage Publications.
- Wartella, E. (Ed.). (1979). Children Communicating: Vol. 7, Sage Annual Review of Communication Research. Beverly Hills, CA: Sage Publications.
- Ward, S., Wackman, D.B., & Wartella, E. (1977). How Children Learn to Buy: The Development of Consumer Information Processing Skills. Beverly Hills, CA: Sage Publications.
