= 1997 Virginia lieutenant gubernatorial election =

- November 4, 1997
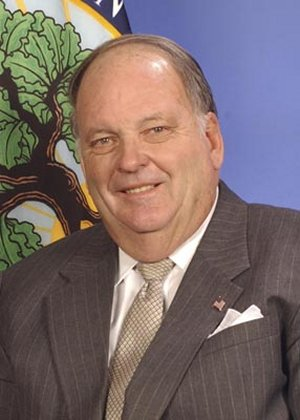

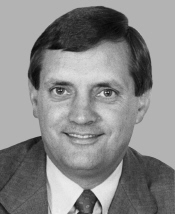
Nominee	John H. Hager	Lewis F. Payne Jr.
Party	Republican	Democratic
Popular vote	839,895	754,404
Percentage	50.16%	45.05%
- Hager: 40–50% 50–60% 60–70% 70–80% Payne: 40–50% 50–60% 60–70%
Lieutenant Governor before election
Don Beyer
Democratic
Elected Lieutenant Governor
John H. Hager
Republican

The 1997 Virginia lieutenant gubernatorial election was held on November 4, 1997. Republican nominee John H. Hager defeated Democratic nominee Lewis F. Payne Jr. with 50.16% of the vote. This was the first time since 1973 that a Republican was elected lieutenant governor of Virginia.

== General election ==
=== Candidates ===
Major party candidates

- John H. Hager, (Republican), Retired Army Captain
- Lewis F. Payne Jr. (Democratic), U.S. Representative

Other candidates

- Bradley E. Evans, Independent

=== Results ===
1997 Virginia lieutenant gubernatorial election
Party	Candidate	Votes	%	±%
Republican	John H. Hager	839,895	50.16%	
Democratic	Lewis F. Payne Jr.	754,404	45.05%	
Independent	Bradley E. Evans	75,024	4.48%	
Majority		85,491		
Turnout				
Republican gain from Democratic		Swing		
