= Vinie Burrows =

American actress (1924–2023)

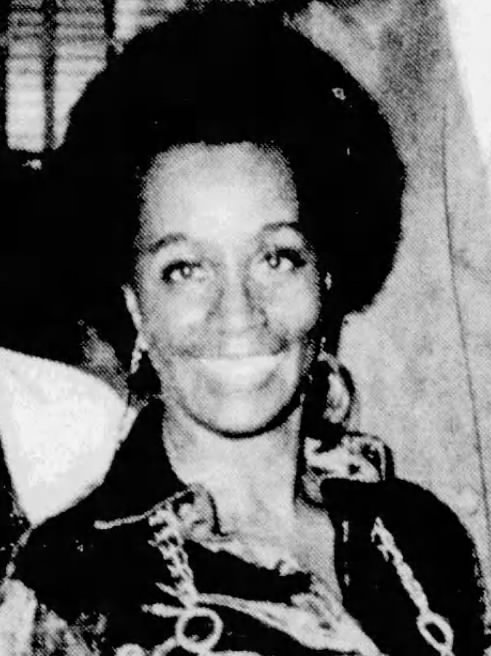
- Burrows in 1977
- Born: Vinie Veronica Burrows; November 15, 1924; New York City, U.S.
- Died: December 25, 2023 (aged 99); New York City, U.S.
- Education: New York University
- Years active: 1950–2017
- Notable work: Walk Together Children; Sister! Sister!; Dark Fire
- Spouse: Dean Harrison (died 1997)
- Children: 2

Vinie Veronica Burrows (November 15, 1924 – December 25, 2023) was an American stage actress on Broadway and creator and star of one-woman shows like Walk Together Children and Sister! Sister!

== Life and career ==
Burrows was born on November 15, 1924 in Harlem, New York City. She started her career as a child actress on radio. Burrows graduated from Wadleigh High School and earned a B.A. from New York University. During her 20s, she debuted on stage when she appeared in the Broadway play The Wisteria Trees. During the 1950s she appeared in more performances, including Green Pastures (1951), Mrs. Patterson (1954), The Skin of Our Teeth (1955), The Ponder Heart (1956) and The World of Shakespeare (1953).

Burrows later chose to create her own plays and one-woman shows because she felt that the roles available for Black women were limited to those of a “Mammie” or “lady of the evening.” Many of her productions were seen on Broadway, and her work was shown in over 6,000 venues across four continents. Burrows adapted, arranged, and performed in these works. Her productions often dealt with themes of peace, liberation, and the elevation of works by women and African authors.

Walk Together Children dramatized the Black experience in America via a mixed-media performance of poetry, prose, and songs all written by Black authors. She solo-starred in the first production of it, off-Broadway at the Greenwich Mews Theater in 1968, where it was produced by Robert Hooks. It toured over 900 colleges across the world, and in 1972 was revived at the Mercer-Brecht theater for 89 more shows. She also dramatized Phyllis Wheatley's poems backed by the dancing of Pearl Primus in Phillis Wheatley, Gentle Poet, Child of Africa, (1973).

She appeared in a show titled Sister! Sister!, which performed at many colleges including the University of Delaware in Newark in November 1991. She appeared in a reprise of the show titled Sister! Sister! at Brandeis University's Women's Studies Research Center in March 2001. In 2003, she played the role of Barbara Scarlatti in Bel Canto on stage in Atlanta, Georgia. At the University of Iowa in March 2007 she appeared in a show titled Black on the Great White Way: The Story of Rose McClendon.

Burrows was to be a panelist in the 2000–2001 African Diaspora lecture series at the Center for Ideas and Society in Riverside, California. The Black Theater Guild at Massachusetts Institute of Technology hosted Burrows for lunch in February 2003. Burrows continued to act in shows into her 90s.

== Personal life and death ==
Burrows was married to Dean Harrison, who died in 1997; they had a daughter and a son. She died on December 25, 2023, at the age of 99 in New York City.

== Activism ==
Burows was active at the United Nations Economic and Social Council on the issues of the status of women and Southern Africa. In 1980, she became an associate of the Women's Institute for Freedom of the Press (WIFP). She participated in the Women's International Democratic Federation and Granny Peace Brigade for many years.

== Selected works ==
Burrows's solo works include:

- Shout Freedom (1963)
- Dark Fire (1965)
- The Female of the Species (1966)
- Walk Together Children (1968)
- Sister! Sister! (early 1970s)
- Echoes of Africa (early 1970s)
- From Swords to Plowshares (early 1970s)
- Phillis Wheatley, Gentle Poet, Child of Africa (1973)
- Black on Broadway

== Awards ==
Burrows won the Paul Robeson Award in 1986. In 2014, Burrows received an award from the International Communications Association and AUDELCO for her Outstanding Contribution to the Arts and the Community. In 2018, Burrows was named the honoree at Theater for the New City's 15th annual Love N' Courage gala, where she was awarded a Lifetime Achievement Award.

In 2020, at age 95, she received an Obie Award for Lifetime Achievement.
