= Caroline Iverson Ackerman =

Aviation teacher, researcher, reporter, and general advocate for flying

Caroline Iverson Ackerman (March 6, 1918 – September 23, 2012) was an American aviator, journalist, reporter and educator. She was the aviation editor of Life magazine during World War II and was the first director of public relations for women for Shell Oil Company.

== Biography ==
Caroline Emilie Iverson was born in Milwaukee, Wisconsin. She was the daughter of Jacob Engval Iverson and Ella Dorothea (Schmidt) Iverson. She earned her B.A. at the University of Wisconsin–Madison in journalism and education in 1939. A licensed pilot, she received her certification in 1940. She taught courses in aviation at the University of Wisconsin–Milwaukee, Milwaukee School of Engineering until 1942 when she joined Life magazine as an aviation researcher, reporter and advocate for flying. She became aviation editor of Life, a position she held for the duration of World War II.

In 1947, she joined Shell Oil Company as the first director of public relations for women. Between 1947 and 1950, she worked under the pseudonym Carol Lane, Women's Travel Director, an advertising character she co-developed, based on her personal experience and for which Shell Oil was later granted a registered trademark. The role was later assumed by multiple women on behalf of Shell Oil Company. As Shell Oil Women's Travel Director, she toured the country speaking as a travel expert on a lecture circuit of women's groups, church groups and advertising clubs, as well as appearing on television and radio. Her areas of expertise included budgeting for weekend get-aways and entertain children on longer car trips. She also wrote a nationally syndicated newspaper columnist penning Tips on Touring.

In 1997, Ackerman became an associate of the Women's Institute for Freedom of the Press (WIFP). WIFP is an American nonprofit publishing organization. The organization works to increase communication between women and connect the public with forms of women-based media.

Ackerman earned her M.S. from Boston University in 1969. In 1970, she became a professor of journalism at Northeastern University in Boston, where she taught until 1978. She had been involved with the Lutheran Church throughout her life. After her retirement from Northeastern, she assisted with communications development, wrote for and eventually became editor of the New England Lutheran until 1992. She also kept active as a freelance writer throughout the rest of her life.

The papers of Caroline Iverson Ackerman are maintained at the Schlesinger Library of the Radcliffe Institute for Advanced Study at Harvard University.

== Personal life ==
In 1949, she married Leslie Ackerman, her husband until his death in 2001 and they raised three children together; she died in 2012, aged 94.

== Notable works ==
- Mass Media Influences on Mobile Suburban Adolescents (Thesis [M.S.] - Boston University, 1969)

== Other sources ==
- Popp, Richard K. (2008) Magazines, Marketing, and the Construction of Travel in the Postwar United States (Temple University Graduate School); ISBN 9780549795773
