= Claudia Dreifus =

American journalist and educator

- Born: New York City
- Occupation: Journalist
- Known for: Interviews
- Notable work: The New York Times Science Tuesday "Conversation With...", Playboy interviews

Claudia Dreifus is an American journalist, educator and lecturer, and producer of the weekly feature “Conversation with…” of the Science Section of The New York Times.Known for her interviews with leading figures in politics and science, she is adjunct associate professor of international affairs and media at the School of International and Public Affairs (SIPA) of Columbia University.

== Early life ==
Claudia Dreifus was born in New York City to Marianne and Henry Dreifus, both German-Jewish refugees. Henry Dreifus was a mechanic in the U.S. Army at the time of her birth and later went on to become involved in local politics.

Claudia Dreifus obtained her Bachelor of Science degree in dramatic arts from New York University. She was active in student politics as the leader of Students for a Democratic Society (SDS) and Students for Democratic Reform (SDR). After graduation, she worked as a labor organizer for hospital workers, Local 1199. During this time, she also began working as a freelance journalist.

== Career ==
=== Journalism ===
Dreifus began to work as a journalist in the mid-1960s. She had a regular column in the underground newspaper The East Village Other and contributed to other small presses. During the 1970s, she interviewed female figures including performing artists Goldie Hawn and Loretta Lynn and congresswomen Patsy Mink and Eleanor Holmes Norton. She also published reviews of feminist authors Germaine Greer and Florynce Kennedy.

By the 1980s, she had established a reputation for her incisive interviews with famous persons in politics and culture. During this time, she interviewed Harry Belafonte (1982), Gabriel García Márquez (Playboy, 1983), and Daniel Ortega (Playboy, 1987).

In the 1990s, Dreifus increasingly took on interviews related to major political figures. She interviewed Benazir Bhutto (1994) and Aung San Suu Kyi for The New York Times (1996). She also kept up her established work as an interviewer for major celebrities, such as Toni Morrison, Bette Midler and Samuel L. Jackson.

Over the course of her career, Dreifus' interviews and long-form narrative articles have appeared in Ms., The Nation, Playboy, Playgirl, The Progressive, Mother Jones, Cosmopolitan, Ladies Home Journal, New Woman, the liberal democrat, New York Post, Newsday, Parade, Penthouse, Present Tense, Redbook, and others.

In 1999, Dreifus began to write the regular “Conversation with…” feature of the Tuesday Science Section of The New York Times. Interviewees have included Abraham Loeb, 2012 Eric R. Kandel and Ruslan M. Medzhitov, in 2011 George Dyson, Jack W. Szostak, Daniel Lieberman, Stephen Hawking, Janet Rowley, in 2010 Jane Goodall, David Weatherall, Diana Reiss, Vanessa Woods, Elaine Fuchs, Jeffrey L. Bada, Sean M. Carroll, Peter Pronovost, Samuel Wang, in 2009 Frank A. Wilczek, Laurence Steinberg, Brian J. Druker, Carol W. Greider, Martin Chalfie, Paul Root Wolpe

Through this work for The New York Times Tuesday Science Section, Dreifus has become increasingly involved in writing about the lives and work of scientists. Her works have appeared in various journals including The New York Times Magazine, Newsweek, Smithsonian, AARP The Magazine, and Scientific American. In 2006, Dreifus was named an Honorary Member of Sigma Xi for her ability to illuminate the work of scientists for a wide public.

=== University instructor ===
In the 1990s, Dreifus worked as a teacher in the Graduate Department of English at the City University of New York.

Since about 2004, she has been an adjunct associate professor of international affairs and media at the School of International and Public Affairs (SIPA) of Columbia University.

=== Author ===
Dreifus has authored, edited, or co-authored eight books, and her work has appeared in over ten anthologies.

In their 2010 book Higher Education?: How Colleges Are Wasting Our Money and Failing Our Kids—and What We Can Do About It, Andrew Hacker and Claudia Dreifus critically scrutinize the system of academia that provides higher education, and question the driving factors behind tuition payments, money spending and financial investments in academia.

== Honors, awards and affiliations ==
Among various honors and affiliations, Dreifus is senior fellow of the World Policy Institute. In 2006, she was inducted as honorary member of Sigma Xi, and in 2007 she was awarded the Career Achievement Award from the American Society of Journalists and Authors.

In 1977, Dreifus became an associate of the Women's Institute for Freedom of the Press (WIFP). Earlier awards to Dreifus included, in 1980, a Special Award for Service to Women from the New York YWCA and obtained three awards in 1987: the Outstanding Magazine Article Award from American Society of Journalists and Authors for Rodrigo's Last Trip Home, the American Values Award for How Rural Woman are Saving the Family Farm, and the American Jewish Press Association's Simon Rockower Award for Distinguished Commentary for Why I Write. She was nominated for the National Magazine Award of 1992 by TV Guide for TVs Censor from Tupelo, an investigative report on censorship.

In 2000, she was listed in the Who's Who in America and the Who's Who In The World, both of Marquis Who's Who.

== Publications ==
Books (author or co-author)

- Andrew Hacker, Claudia Dreifus: Higher Education?: How Colleges Are Wasting Our Money and Failing Our Kids—and What We Can Do About It, Henry Holt & Co., 2010, ISBN 978-0805087345
- Andrew Hacker, Claudia Dreifus: The Athletics Incubus: How College Sports Undermine College Education, Henry Holt and Co., 2011 (previously published as part of Higher Education?), ISBN 978-1429958608
- Andrew Hacker, Claudia Dreifus: The Golden Dozen: Is the Ivy League Worth the Dollars?, 2011 (previously published as part of Higher Education?), ISBN 9781429958745
- Claudia Dreifus: Scientific Conversations: Interviews on Science from The New York Times, Times Books, 2002, ISBN 978-0805071801
- Claudia Dreifus: Interview, Seven Stories Press, 1999, ISBN 978-1888363425, with a foreword by Clyde Haberman
- Claudia Dreifus: Woman's fate: raps from a feminist consciousness-raising group, Bantam Books, 1973
- Claudia Dreifus: Radical lifestyles, Lancer Books, 1971 (summary)

Editor and/or contributor

- Claudia Dreifus, ed.: Seizing our bodies: the politics of women's health, Vintage Books, 1977, ISBN 978-0394723600
- Dreifus, Claudia. "Forward." The Doctor's Case against the Pill. Barbara Seaman, ed. 25th Anniversary Edition. Alameda, CA: Hunter House, 1995.
- Strainchamps, Ethel R. Rooms with No View: A Woman's Guide to the Man's World of the Media. Harper and Row, 1974. (Compiled anonymously by the Media Women's Association).

Anthologies including Dreifus' work

- Capaldi, Nicholas. Immigration: Debating the Issues. Amherst, NY: Prometheus Books, 1997. (Includes interview with Doris Meissner "The worst job in the world?")
- Denard, Carolyn C. Toni Morrison: Conversations. Jackson: University Press of Mississippi, 2008. (Includes interview "Chloe Wofford talks about Toni Morrison")
- Funk, Robert, Linda S. Coleman, and Susan Day. Strategies for College Writing: A Rhetorical Reader. Upper Saddle River, N.J: Prentice Hall, 2003.
- García, Márquez G., and Gene H. Bell-Villada. Conversations with Gabriel García Márquez. Jackson: University Press of Mississippi, 2006. (Includes Playboy interview)
- Gartner, Alan, Colin Greer, and Frank Riessman. What Nixon Is Doing to Us. New York: Harper & Row, 1973. (Chapter "Women: Behind Every Man")
- Jaggar, Alison M, and Paula S. Rothenberg. Feminist Frameworks: Alternative Theoretical Accounts of the Relations between Women and Men. New York: McGraw-Hill, 1984.
- Katzman, Allen. Our Time: An Anthology of Interviews from the East Village Other. New York: Dial Press, 1972.
- Polner, Murray, and Stefan Merken. Peace, Justice, and Jews: Reclaiming Our Tradition. New York: Bunim Bannigan, 2007. ("Berlin Stories" by Claudia Dreifus)
- Price, Barbara R, and Natalie J. Sokoloff. The Criminal Justice System and Women: Women Offenders, Victims, Workers. New York, NY: Clark Boardman, 1982.
- Schulder, Diane, and Florynce Kennedy. Abortion Rap. New York: McGraw-Hill, 1971.
- Stambler, Sookie. Women's Liberation: Blueprint for the Future. New York: Ace Books, 1970. ("The Great Abortion Suit")
- Winburn, Janice. Shop Talk and War Stories: American Journalists Examine Their Profession. Boston: Bedford/St. Martin's, 2003. ("Preparation, chemistry, and the interview as an act of seduction" by Claudia Dreifus.)
