= Andrew Hacker =

American political scientist and public intellectual (1929–2026)

- Hacker in 2004
- Born: August 30, 1929; New York City, U.S.
- Died: April 21, 2026 (aged 96); New York City, U.S.
- Occupations: Academic and political scientist
- Spouse: Claudia Dreifus (m. 2011)
- Children: 1
- Parent: Louis M. Hacker

Academic background
- Education: Amherst College
- Alma mater: University of Oxford; Princeton University

Academic work
- Sub-discipline: Political scientist
- Institutions: Cornell University; Queens College
- Notable works: The Math Myth

Andrew Hacker (August 30, 1929 – April 21, 2026) was an American political scientist and public intellectual.

== Life and career ==
Andrew Hacker was born in Manhattan on August 30, 1929. He was the son of Louis M. Hacker – a professor of economics at Columbia University. His mother, Lilian, was also on the faculty as a lecturer at the Teachers College. He was educated at the Lincoln School which was an experimental and progressive school, run by the Teachers College to try new methods of education. After the 10th grade, he transferred to the Horace Mann School in the Bronx which was a similar experimental school run by the Teachers College.

He did his undergraduate work at Amherst College, followed by graduate work at the University of Oxford and Princeton University, where he received his PhD degree.

He was a professor in the department of political science at Queens College in New York. Hacker taught at Cornell before taking his position at Queens.

Hacker was a member of Mark Lane's Citizens’ Committee of Inquiry, and introduced Lane to Edward Jay Epstein. Hacker was described by Epstein as the "initial stimulus" for his master's thesis which he later developed into his book Inquest (1966) that was critical of the Warren Commission.

His book Higher Education? was written in collaboration with his wife, Claudia Dreifus. In his article Is Algebra Necessary?, Hacker questioned whether mathematics is necessary, claiming "Making mathematics mandatory prevents us from discovering and developing young talent."

Hacker died at a hospital in Manhattan on April 21, 2026, at the age of 96, from complications of stomach cancer.

== Publications ==
- Hacker, A., (1961) Political Theory: Philosophy, Ideology, Science, The Macmillan Company
- Hacker, A., (1968) The End of the American Era. New York: Atheneum
- Hacker, A., (1992) Two Nations: Black and White, Separate, Hostile, Unequal, Scribner. ISBN 0-7432-3824-9
- Hacker, A., (1998) Money: Who Has How Much and Why, Simon and Schuster. ISBN 0-684-84662-4
- Hacker, A., (2003) Mismatch: The Growing Gulf Between Women and Men. Scribner. ISBN 0-684-86252-2
- Hacker, A. and Claudia Dreifus, (2010) Higher Education?: How Colleges Are Wasting Our Money and Failing Our Kids - and What We Can Do About It Holt, Henry & Company, Inc. ISBN 978-0-8050-8734-5
- Hacker, A., (2012) "Is Algebra Necessary?", New York Times, Published July 28, 2012. https://www.nytimes.com/2012/07/29/opinion/sunday/is-algebra-necessary.html
- Hacker, A., (2016) "The Math Myth: And Other STEM Delusions," The New Press. ISBN 978-1620970683
- Hacker, A., (2020) Downfall: The Demise of a President and His Party, Skyhorse Publishing. ISBN 978-1-5107-6019-6
