= Donna Allen (activist) =

American activist and economist (1920–1999)

- Born: August 19, 1920; Petoskey, Michigan, U.S.
- Died: July 19, 1999 (aged 78)
- Education: Duke University; University of Chicago; Howard University
- Occupations: Activist, historian and economist
- Known for: Founder of the Women's Institute for Freedom of the Press

Donna Allen (August 19, 1920 – July 19, 1999) was an American pioneer feminist, civil rights activist, historian, economist, and founder of the Women's Institute for Freedom of the Press.

== Biography ==
Allen was born in Petoskey, Michigan, on August 19, 1920, to Caspar and Louis Rehkopf. In 1943, Allen graduated from Duke University, majoring in history and minoring in economics. In 1953, she earned her master's degree in economics from the University of Chicago. Finally, in 1971, she received a Ph.D. in history from Howard University. Her dissertation was on national health insurance. Allen founded the Women's Institute for Freedom of the Press in 1972. Allen died at the age of 78 on July 19, 1999.

== The Donna Allen Award for Feminist Advocacy ==
The Donna Allen Award for Feminist Advocacy is given in Allen's honor by the Commission on the Status of Women for the Association for Education in Journalism and Mass Communication (AEJMC). The award was created in 2001. It recognizes feminist media activists who promote women's rights and freedoms.

Recipients of this award include:

- 2001 – Award Created
- 2002 – no winner on record
- 2003 – Ammu Joseph, Women's Feature Service
- 2004 – Rita Henley Jenson, Women's eNews
- 2005 – Michelle Weldon, Northwestern
- 2006 – no winner on record
- 2007 – no winner on record
- 2008 – Caryl Rivers, Boston
- 2009 – Carolyn Byerly, Howard
- 2010 – Pamela Creedon, Iowa
- 2011 – ?
- 2012 – ?
- 2013 – Soraya Chemaly
- 2014 - Barbara Friedman and Anne Johnston
- 2015 – Tania Cantrell Rosas-Moreno
- 2016 – Stine Eckert
- 2017 – Carolyn Bronstein
- 2018 – Petula Dvorak
- 2019 – Tracy Everbach
- 2020 – Susan Leath
- 2021 – Maria Marron

== Writings ==
=== Books ===
- Women Transforming Communications: Global Intersections (edited with Ramona R. Rush, Susan J. Kaufman, eds.) (SAGE Publications, 1996).OCLC 469788564
- Communications at the Crossroads: The Gender Gap Connection (edited with Ramona R. Rush) (Ablex Publishing Corporation, 1989).
- Fringe Benefits: Wages or Social Obligations?; (Ithaca, NY: Cornell University, 1964).

=== Periodicals ===
- Media Report to Women; (1972–1987) : Editor.

== Awards ==
Year	Award	Issued By
April 1978	Broadcast Preceptor Award	Broadcast Communication Arts Department
March 16, 1979	Journalistic Excellence	Capital Press Women
September 25, 1979	National Headliner Award	Women in Communications, Inc.
November 14, 1983	A Women Striving for Equity and Peace	The Wonder Woman Foundation Awards
October 7, 1987	For Preserving Documents to the History of American Journalism	American Journalism Historians Association
July 1988	Award for Outstanding Contribution to Women in Communication	Association for Education in Journalism and Mass Communication
