= Tobe Levin =

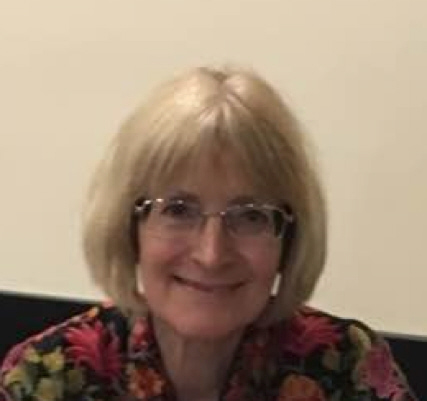
Tobe Levin (2017)

Tobe Levin Freifrau von Gleichen (born February 16, 1948), a multi-lingual scholar, translator, editor and activist, is an Associate of the Hutchins Center for African and African American Research at Harvard University; a visiting research fellow at the International Gender Studies Centre, Lady Margaret Hall, University of Oxford; an activist against female genital mutilation (FGM) and professor of English Emerita at the University of Maryland, University College.

Having received her PhD in 1979 from Cornell University, she is most known for combining her advocacy against FGM with her academic scholarship in comparative literature. She has published peer-reviewed and popular articles and book chapters, edited four books, launched UnCUT/VOICES Press in 2009 and founded Feminist Europa Review of Books (1998–2010). Her most notable works to date are Empathy and Rage. Female Genital Mutilation in African Literature and Waging Empathy. Alice Walker, Possessing the Secret of Joy, and the Global Movement to Ban FGM. Alice Walker expressed appreciation for the text that shows worldwide solidarity with the novelist's literary abolition efforts in the early nineties. Levin has also teamed up with Maria Kiminta and photographer Britta Radike to publish a memoir and sourcebook, Kiminta. A Maasai's Fight against Female Genital Mutilation.

== Early life and education ==
Born in Long Branch, NJ, Levin was the daughter of Morris William Levin and Janice Metz Levin.

In 1970 she earned her B.A. in English from Ithaca College (NY), graduating summa cum laude as salutatorian. Three years later she received her M.A. in French from NYU in Paris in conjunction with a degree from the University of Paris III (Censier). Her memoir de maitrise (M.A. thesis) treated images of women in Rousseau and Diderot and represented an early encounter with feminist literary criticism.

In 1973 she enrolled as a PhD candidate at Cornell University. While pursuing doctoral research in absentia in Munich, she first learned about female genital mutilation (FGM) through Alice Schwarzer’s feminist magazine EMMA, and became part of the German national movement to end FGM.

In 1979 she earned her PhD in comparative literature from Cornell University, with her dissertation on “Ideology and Aesthetics in Neo-Feminist German Fiction: Verena Stefan, Elfriede Jelinek, and Margot Schroeder.” She thus became the first scholar whose doctoral work featured the 2004 Nobel Laureate in Literature Elfriede Jelinek.

== Activism against FGM ==
In 1977, the June issue of the German feminist magazine EMMA carried an article titled "Clitoridectomy." After sacks full of letters from concerned readers reached the EMMA mailroom, the editors decided to organize interest groups in all West Germany's major cities. Alice Schwarzer, editor-in-chief of EMMA assigned national coordination to Dr. Levin's group in Munich. In 1979, Levin co-published the first guidebook for these action committees: Materialien zur Unterstützung von Aktionsgruppen gegen Klitorisbeschneidung. This early work lead to joint ventures with Europe's leading figures against FGM, primary among them Awa Thiam in Paris and Efua Dorkenoo OBE who founded FORWARD in the UK and encouraged the birth of a German 'little sister'.

Thus, in 1998 Levin co-founded FORWARD-Germany e.V., a non-profit focused on fighting FGM in Germany and dedicated to ending FGM worldwide. The organization first gained momentum by forming strong coalitions with like-minded civil society organizations responding to increased immigration from Africa to Germany, much of it occasioned by the government breakdown and subsequent civil war in Somalia. Today, FORWARD works closely with government institutions: e.g. with municipal ombudswomen for women's issues and with federal ministries for immigration, development and health. Furthermore, FORWARD regularly cooperates with Germany's largest African women's NGO, MAISHA, initially active in Frankfurt and now throughout the country; and with many associations in INTEGRA, an umbrella for German NGOs against FGM. In 2002 FORWARD won the Dr. Ingrid Gräfin zu Solms Foundation Human Rights Award and in 2005 the Olympe de Gouges Award (presented by the German Social Democratic Party, SPD) for its Somalia girls project.

=== Activism ===
Levin has also spoken out against male circumcision.

In 2014, Levin became an associate of the Women's Institute for Freedom of the Press (WIFP). WIFP is an American nonprofit publishing organization. The organization works to increase communication between women and connect the public with forms of women-based media.

== Professional life ==
In 1979 Levin joined the faculty of the University of Maryland University College in Europe, teaching English and women's studies to U.S. military personnel. While remaining at this post, Levin became an adjunct lecturer at Goethe University Frankfurt in 1985, where she became the first in Germany to teach courses on black-Jewish women writers, as well as the literature on FGM.

From here she went on to hold her first of many visiting research positions as a Five Colleges Women's Studies Research Associate at Mount Holyoke College (2004). She then went on to do research at Brandeis University (2006), Cornell University (2010), and in International Women's Studies at Lady Margaret Hall, University of Oxford (2014). In 2006 she became a non-resident fellow at Harvard University's W.E.B. Du Bois Institute for African American Research, and was promoted to Associate in 2009.

In 2002 she won the Presidential Award of the University of Maryland University College for excellence in scholarship. Seven years later she was again recognized for excellence in research with a University System of Maryland Regents' Award.
