= Terre des Femmes =

German advocacy group

Terre des Femmes (French, translation: Women's Earth) is a German non-profit-organisation committed to human rights for girls and women. The vision of the organisation is a world in which all people are equal, independent and free, irrespective of their gender. Since its formation in 1981, Terre des Femmes has grown into one of the largest women's rights organisations in Germany with over 2000 members. The national headquarter's work in Berlin is supported by over 20 local volunteer groups across Germany.

== Objectives ==
Terre des femmes strives for international networking with other women's rights organizations, supports women in consulting, and supports projects, organisations and initiatives by women for women from abroad. They fight against female genital mutilation, violence in the name of honour (forced marriage, honour killing), trafficking in women, forced prostitution and sexual and domestic violence.

== History ==
An article in Brigitte magazine about violence against women and honor killings in the Middle East prompted journalist Ingrid Staehle and a group of women in Hamburg to take action. The article was based on a documentary entitled Princesses mortes published by the Swiss human rights organization Sentinelles. During a visit to the Lausanne-based organization, the idea was born to found an association based on the human rights organization Terre des hommes under the name Terre des Femmes ('Women's Earth') with the subtitle Human rights for women. In July 1981 Terre des femmes was entered in the register of associations of the city of Hamburg.

Other early founders of Terre des Femmes were the historian Herta Haas and the American literary scholar Tobe Levin.

A Swiss branch of the group was founded in November 2003. Both clubs are independent organisations.

Terre des Femmes is a member of ECPAT. The group is financed by donations, corporate partnerships, grants from multiple institutions and foundations and membership fees. Over 3,500 members and patrons participate in this organization.

=== Yearly events ===
One of their events is "FrauenWelten" (Women's Worlds), which is an annual film festival held in Tübingen. Another yearly event is their "flag campaign", which is a nationwide initiative that takes place on 25 November which is the International Day for the Elimination of Violence Against Women.

== Criticism ==
The organisation has received criticism for its anti-transgender views based on an open letter that was also signed by one board member. As response, the German journalist and feminist activist Sibel Schick has criticized Terre des Femmes for being transphobic and racist.
