= Elementary schools in the United States =

Primary education in the United States

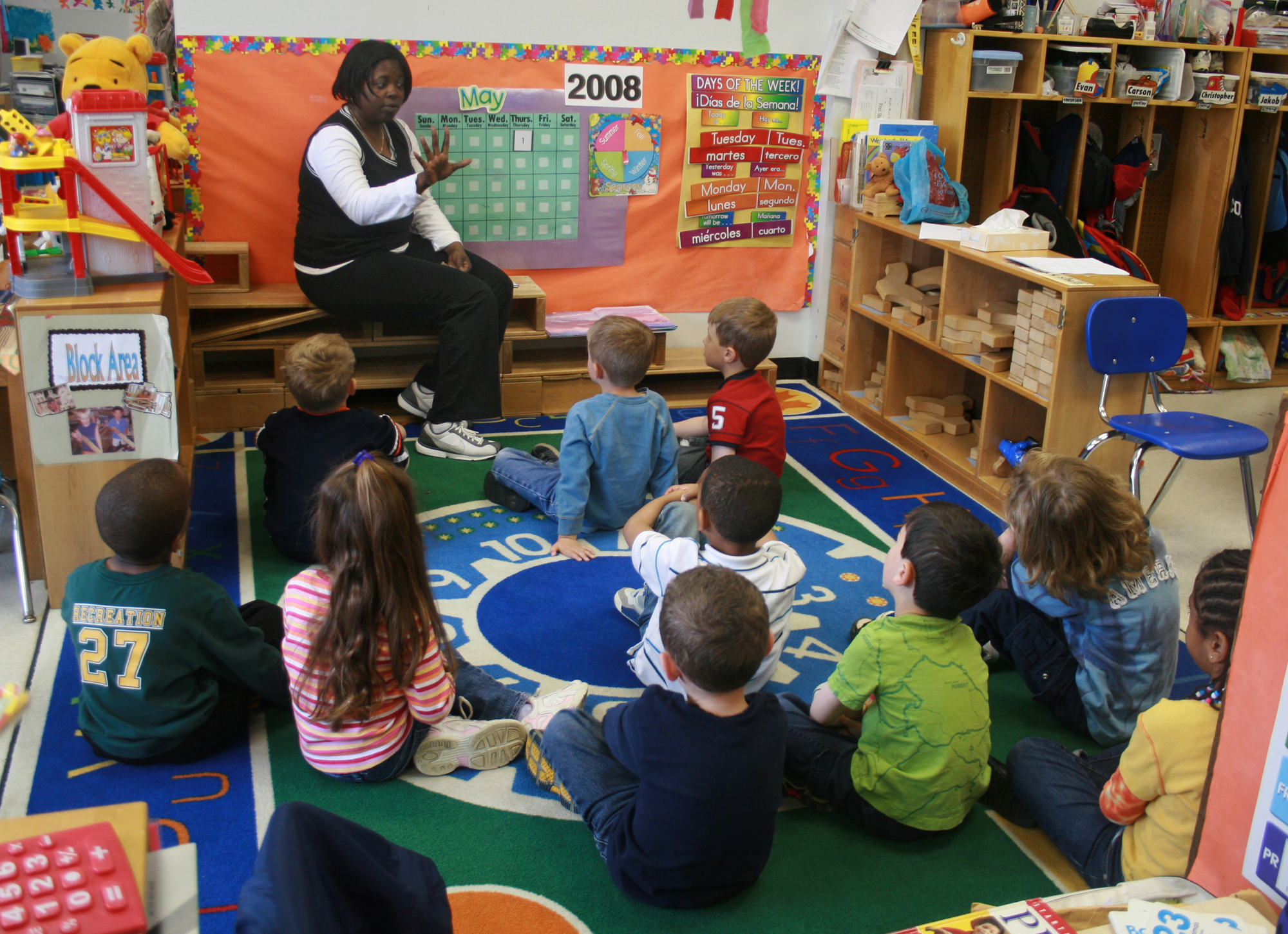
A teacher and her students in an elementary school classroom

In the United States, elementary schools are the main point of delivery for primary education, teaching children between the ages of 5–10 (sometimes 4-10 or 4-12) and coming between pre-kindergarten and secondary education.

In 2017, there were 106,147 elementary schools (73,686 public, 32,461 private) in the United States, a figure which includes all schools that teach students from first grade through eighth grade. According to the National Center for Education Statistics, in the fall of 2020 almost 32.8 million students attended public primary schools. It is usually from pre-kindergarten through fifth grade, although the NCES displays this data as pre-kindergarten through eighth grade.

== Curriculum ==
Primary education tends to focus on basic academic learning, vocational skills and socialization skills, introducing children to the broad range of knowledge, skill and behavioral adjustment they need to succeed in life – and, particularly, in secondary school. In general, a student learns basic arithmetic and sometimes rudimentary algebra in mathematics, English proficiency (such as basic grammar, spelling, and vocabulary), and fundamentals of other subjects. Learning standards are identified for all areas of a curriculum by individual states, including those for mathematics, social studies, science, physical development, the fine arts, and reading. While the concept of state learning standards has been around for some time, the No Child Left Behind Act has mandated that standards exist at the state level.

Basic subjects are taught in elementary school, and students often remain in one classroom throughout the school day (until starting different blocks), except for physical education, library, music, and art classes.

Typically, the curriculum in public elementary education is determined by individual school districts. The school district selects curriculum guides and textbooks that reflect a state's learning standards and benchmarks for a given grade level.

The broad topic of social studies may include key events, documents, understandings, and concepts in American history and geography, and in some programs, state or local history and geography. Topics included under the broader term "science" vary from the physical sciences such as physics and chemistry, through the biological sciences such as biology, ecology, and physiology.

There is much discussion within educational circles about the justification and impact of curricula that place greater emphasis on those topics (reading, writing and math) that are specifically tested for improvement.

Since the implementation of the No Child Left Behind Act, the teaching of social studies and science has been underdeveloped in elementary school programs. Some attribute this to the fact that elementary school teachers are trained as generalists; however, teachers attribute this to the priority placed on developing reading, writing and math proficiency in the elementary grades and to the large amount of time needed to do so. Reading, writing and math proficiency greatly affect performance in social studies, science and other content areas.

=== Standardized testing ===
Since the No Child Left Behind Act and the Every Student Succeeds Act were passed, students now take more standardized tests. Practice tests are given followed by the actual tests. The standardized tests that are required to be given can't be made or modified by the educator. This results in students having to learn more, if not all, of the required subjects and topics that will be inputted in the tests.

Although standardized tests cause issues and setbacks in the classroom, they do have their benefits just like everything else in the education curriculum. By giving students standardized tests, it provides the state with how each individual child is doing academically. Using these tests is not only the most effective, but the least biased way to measure every student's academic achievement in the same way. When students and educators take the preparation period of standardized testing seriously, it is also a great way for the state to measure how well each school functions. The use of standardized testing in the classrooms gives the policymakers and educators a fair opportunity to see how much the students are learning, and what educators should keep and fix in their current curriculum.

== Teaching ==
Elementary School teachers are trained with emphasis on human cognitive and psychological development and the principles of curriculum development and instruction. Teachers typically earn either a Bachelor's or master's degree in Early Childhood and Elementary Education.

Teachers being trained within programs will be taught the stray away from the traditional learning techniques, such as textbooks and testing based learning. The idea of these programs being to broaden teaching techniques and perspectives, many critiques still argue this claim and believe that teaching should be taught in one way and one way only. Many claim that the idea of focusing on social-emotional learning takes away time from the core subjects. In a blog from Hello Lovely Living the following quote is stated “Lessons are delivered in a structured, sequential manner, allowing students to build knowledge step by step” (“The Hidden Benefits…” 3). The author of this article states that the benefit of traditional learning is the structure and organization given. The main purpose the author is conveying is that consistency and structure is a vital piece of childhood education.

Training programs for elementary school teachers often cover a variety of educational theories, including constructivist, behavioral, and socio-cultural approaches to learning. These programs also focus on developing skills in classroom management, differentiation to meet diverse learning needs, and effective communication strategies with students, parents, and colleagues.

Certification standards for teachers are determined by individual states, with individual colleges and universities determining the rigor of the college education provided for future teachers. Some states require content area tests, as well as instructional skills tests for teacher certification in that state.

Public Elementary School teachers typically instruct between twenty and thirty students of diverse learning needs. A typical classroom will include children with a range of learning needs or abilities, from those identified as having special needs of the kinds listed in the Individuals with Disabilities Act to those that are cognitively, athletically or artistically gifted.

Teachers use a variety of ways to teach, with a focus on getting pupils attention. Humor is sometimes used. Cartoons, for example, can capture ideas in one image.

A study of seven industrialized nations found that in 2006, the average starting salary of American public primary school teachers with minimum qualifications was $34,900. In this regard the United States was second only to Germany (non-U.S. salaries were converted to U.S. dollars at purchasing power parity).

The 2007 a survey conducted by the American Federation of Teachers (AFT) reported that the average salary for an American teacher was $51,009; this is also recorded as the first time in history the average pay for teachers has exceeded the $50,000 mark.

The National Center for Education Statistics found that as of the 2019-2020 school year, the average American teacher makes $63,645. Mississippi has the lowest average teacher's salary at $45,192, and New York has the highest average teacher's salary at $87,543.

According to the Bureau of Labor Statistics, there are roughly 1.4 million primary school teachers employed in the United States as of 2012, with average earnings of $55,270, and median earnings of $52,840.

== COVID-19 impact on learning ==
In March 2020, the COVID-19 pandemic in the United States forced many schools to quickly change to remote learning. By the end of the month, every public school within the United States had closed. Only schools in Montana and Wyoming opened towards the end of the school year. By the start of the 2021-22 school year the following states required in-person instruction for all or some grades: Arkansas, Florida, Iowa, and Texas.

=== Impact on educators and parents ===
Covid-19 caused educators to have to learn how to aid their students through a screen and take on a greater workload, while parents had to stay home, if possible, to assist their children in learning remotely. Since schools shut-down and went fully remote, educators had to adjust fast. Normally, the workload they have is tolerable but, while under lockdown, more was piled on and they had to be more on top of everything. The pandemic without a doubt has reduced learning time.

The attention spans of the students online isn’t the same as in the classroom. This results in poorer student performance. A lot of students didn't have the technology for remote learning, they were unable to get it themselves as well. All of this resulted in parents needing to slow down. A lot within their lives have changed, especially with being a teacher-like figure in their child’s lives. Parents have to be an active part in their children's education, now more than ever. The majority of Elementary students don’t have the attention span to sit in front of a computer all day, educators need to be able to engage their students properly. Simplicity is better when it comes to remote learning. All curriculum being given should be as easy for the students to access as it is for the teachers. Finding technological tasks that are simple yet have lots of depth in the topic in which is being taught is important to find.

Future elementary educators have some curriculum changes in their classes in order to better prepare them for the pandemic side of teaching. One of the main and most common changes throughout the United States is technology. Using and knowing how to properly use technology is a very important factor in K-6 learning and teaching. When the pandemic caused remote learning to be in place caused issues for the instruction of the young learners. Future educators in the making have to contain a certain amount of skills in technology so they can properly teach their students in any circumstance that may occur.

=== Impact on students ===
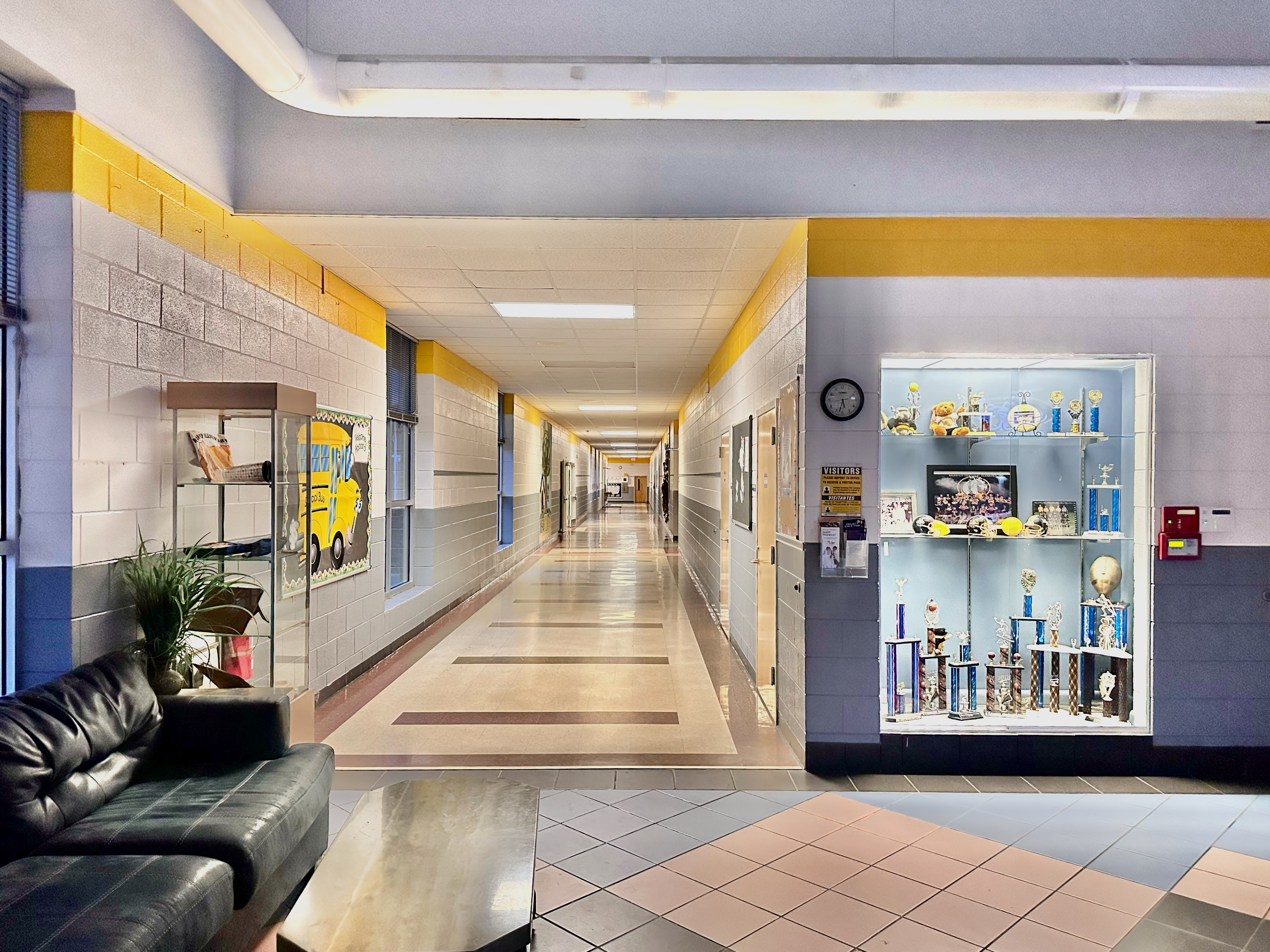
The interior of a modern elementary school

Remote learning set-back students in learning their fine motor skills and it took a toll on their emotional and social health. Many elementary students are still learning or perfecting their fine motor skills. Not only did it affect their fine motor skills, it took a great impact on their social and emotional health. Having emotional and social health problems could possibly hurt the way the students are able to take in information.

The gap between high- and low-achieving students will become greater, this can be difficult for the lower achieving students to keep up in the classroom or the higher achieving students to keep their attention span. Learning loss during the pandemic was a very common occurrence when students returned back to face-to-face learning. It set-back their education due to educators having to re-teach what was already taught.

== Governance ==
Authority to regulate education resides constitutionally with the individual states, with direct authority of the U.S. Congress and the federal U.S. Department of Education being limited to regulation and enforcement of federal constitutional rights. Great indirect authority is, however, exercised through federal funding of national programs and block grants although there is no obligation upon any state to accept these funds. The U.S. government may also propose, but cannot enforce national goals, objectives and standards, which generally lie beyond its jurisdiction.

Most states have predetermined the number of minutes that will be taught within a given content area. Because the No Child Left Behind Act focuses on reading and math as primary targets for improvement, other instructional areas have received less attention.

Learning Standards are the goals by which states and school districts must meet adequate yearly progress (AYP) as mandated by the No Child Left Behind Act (NCLB). This description of school governance is simplistic at best, however, and school systems vary widely not only in the way curricular decisions are made but also in how teaching and learning take place. Some states and/or school districts impose more top-down mandates than others. In others, teachers play a significant role in curriculum design and there are few top-down mandates. Curricular decisions within private schools are made differently from those made in public schools, and in most cases without consideration of NCLB directives.

At times, an individual school district identifies areas of need within the curriculum. Teachers and advisory administrators form committees to develop supplemental materials to support learning for diverse learners and to identify enrichment for textbooks. Many school districts post information about the curriculum and supplemental materials on websites for public access.

Under the No Child Left Behind Act of 2001, public schools receiving government funding are required to test and assess student progress each year. Individual states and not the federal government are required to develop their own set of standards by which they measure student progress. Although standardized testing is seen as a valid way for measuring content knowledge and progress in areas such as math and reading at the primary level there is much dispute within the scientific community on how to measure the progress of scientific knowledge.

In 1996 the National Research Council (NRC) and the National Science Teachers Association (NSTA) got together with other science organizations to develop the "National Science Education Standards". In the past simply the study of and presentation of core content knowledge for areas such as: physical, life, earth, and space sciences; was seen as sufficient. After the development of the new "Science Standards" concern shifted from teaching content alone to learning science “disciplines in the context of inquiry, technology, personal [and] social perspectives”.

== History ==
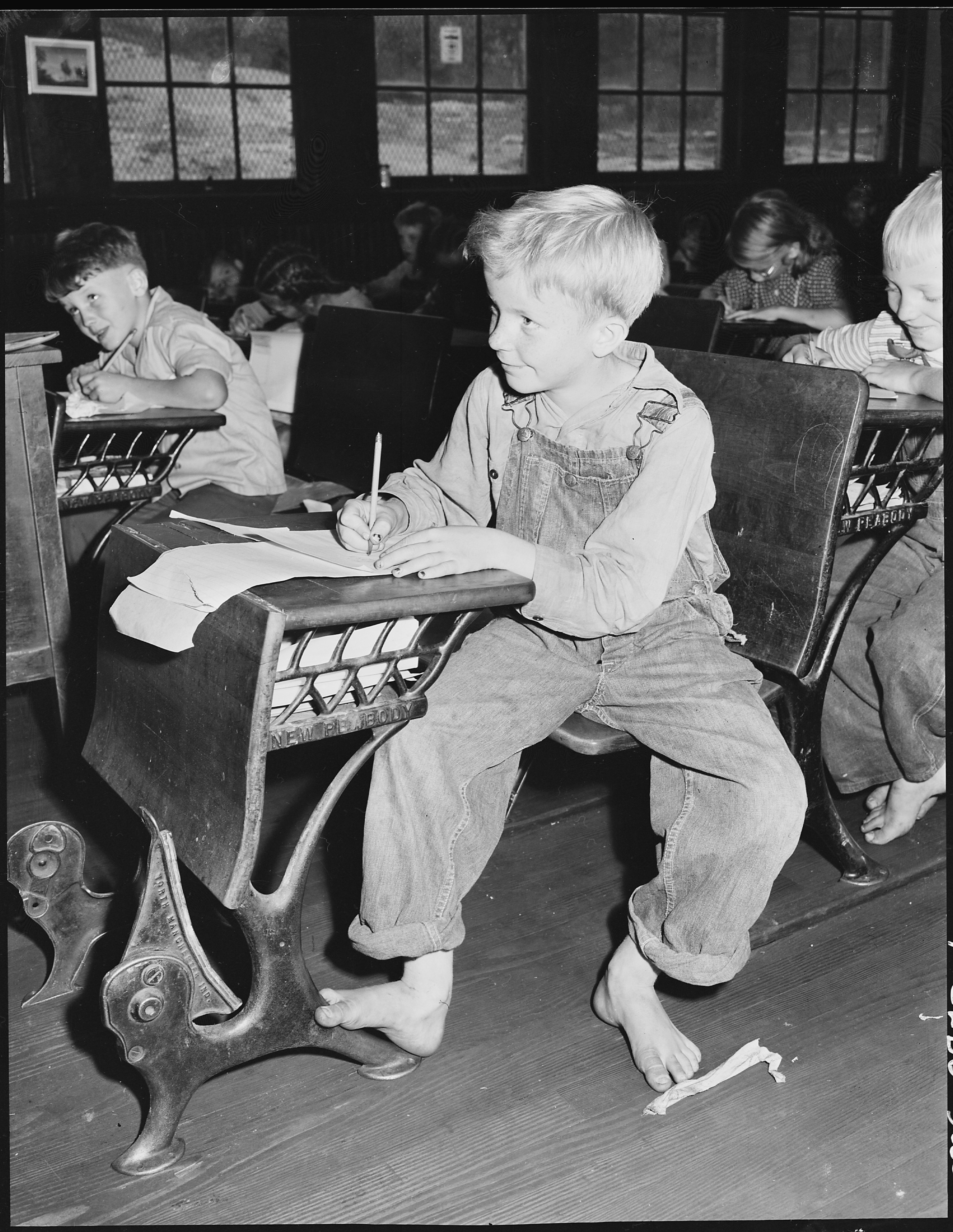
A boy in an elementary school in Kentucky, 1946

Originally, elementary school was synonymous with primary education, taking children from kindergarten through grade 8; and secondary school was entirely coextensive with the high school grades 9–12. This system was the norm in the United States until the years following World War I, because most children in most parts of what was then the mostly rural United States could go no further than Grade 8. Even when the high schools were available, they were often not accessible.

As the population grew and became increasingly urban and suburban instead of rural, the one-room schoolhouse gave way to the multi-room schoolhouse, which became multiple schools. This produced the third genre of school – the junior high school – which was designed to provide transitional preparation from primary school to secondary school, thus serving as a bridge between the elementary school and the high school. Elementary schools typically operated grades Kindergarten through 6; the junior high school, often housed in the same building as the senior high school, then covered grades 7 through 9; and the senior high school operated grades 10 through 12. At the same time, grade 9 marked the beginning of high school for the purpose of GPA calculation.

It was typical during this period for state departments of education to certify (in California, "credential") teachers to work in either primary or secondary education. A Primary School Certificate qualified the holder to teach any subject in grades K through 8, and his/her major and minor subjects in grade 9. A Secondary School Certificate qualified the holder to teach any subject in grades 7 and 8, and his/her major and minor subjects in grades 9 through 12. Certain subjects, such as music, art, physical, and special education were or could be conferred as K through 12 Teaching Certificates.

By the late 1960s, the lines of transition between primary and secondary education began to blur, and the junior high school started to get replaced by the middle school. This change typically saw reassignment of grade 9 to the (senior) high school, with grade 6 sometimes included in middle school with grades 7 and 8. Subsequent decades in many states have also seen the realignment of teacher certification, with grade 6 frequently now included on the secondary teaching certificate. Thus, whereas 20th-century American education began with the elementary school finishing at grade 8, the 21st century begins with the American elementary school finishing at grade 5 in many jurisdictions. Some elementary schools were K–4, middle schools were 5–7, and high schools were 8–12.

Nevertheless, the older systems do persist in many jurisdictions. While they are in the minority today, there are still school districts which, instead of adopting the "middle school", still distinguish between junior and senior high schools. Thus, high schools can be either 9–12, which is most common, 8–12, or 10–12.

Over the past few decades, schools in the USA have been testing various arrangements which break from the one-teacher, one-class model. Multi-age programs, where children in different grades (e.g., Kindergarten through to second grade) share the same classroom and teachers, is one increasingly popular alternative to traditional elementary instruction. Another alternative is that children might have a main class and go to another teacher's room for one subject, such as science, while the science teacher's main class will go to the other teacher's room for another subject, such as social studies. This could be called a two-teacher, or a rotation. It is similar to the concept of teams in junior high school. Another method is to have the children have one set of classroom teachers in the first half of the year, and a different set of classroom teachers in the second half of the year.

== See also ==
- Blab school
- Environmental groups and resources serving K–12 schools
- K–12 (education)
- Primary education in the United States
