= Primary education in the United States =

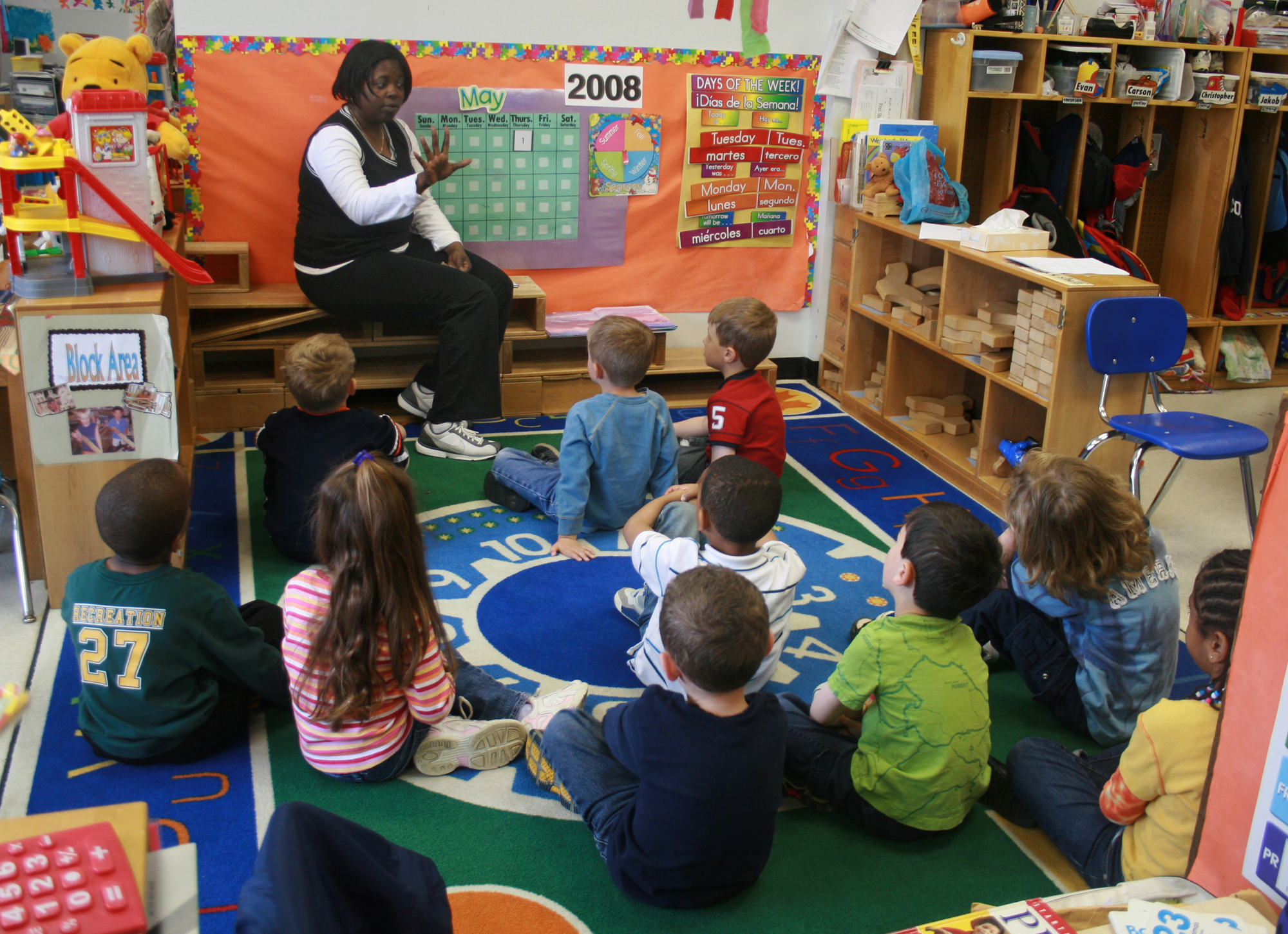
A teacher and her students in an elementary school classroom

Primary education in the United States (also called elementary education) refers to the first seven to nine years of formal education in most jurisdictions, often in elementary schools, including middle schools. Preschool programs, which are less formal and usually not mandated by law, are generally not considered part of primary education. The first year of primary education is commonly referred to as kindergarten and begins at or around age 5 or 6. Subsequent years are usually numbered being referred to as first grade, second grade, and so forth. Elementary schools normally continue through sixth grade, which the students normally complete when they are age 11 or 12. Some elementary schools graduate after the 4th or 5th grade and transition students into a middle school.

In 2016, there were 88,665 elementary schools (66,758 public and 21,907 private) in the United States.

== Preschool ==
Some private schools, and public schools, are offering pre-kindergarten (also known as pre-K) as part of elementary school. Twelve states (Alabama, Florida, Georgia, Iowa, New Jersey, New Mexico, New York, Oklahoma, West Virginia, Wisconsin, and Vermont) as well as the District of Columbia offer some form of universal pre-kindergarten according to the Education Commission of the States (ECS).

The first three to five years of an individual’s life can be the most critical period of their education (preschool). During this time period young minds work on several physical, intellectual, and emotional developments, including curiosity, formation of character, personality, cognition, language skills, and social skills.

Since 1965, the federal government has promoted the growth of state-funded programs such as Head Start, a program under the United States Department of Health and Human Services. By 2020, it had served over 37 million preschool-aged children and their families; in fiscal year 2019 alone it served over 1 million children. Head Start also works to educate the whole child in addition to providing health and nutrition services to low-income families.

== Elementary school ==
Elementary schools are schools that span grades K or 1 through 4, 5, or 6. Students may attend either a 4-year, 5-year, 6-year or 7-year public or private elementary school. Upon successful completion of their elementary education students then proceed to middle school, also known as junior high school. Depending on the school district, some students attend separate middle schools, beginning at 6th grade and then completing at 8th grade before they transition to high school, also known as senior high school. Additionally, students may have the option of attending elementary schools that include all eight primary grades. In this case, the student will directly proceed to high school, or senior high school.

In most U.S. elementary schools, a class of students is assigned to a particular teacher and classroom for an entire school year. Those students will spend the vast majority of that school year together in that one classroom learning from that one teacher, and that teacher is expected to carefully supervise their students at all times (apart from lunch and recess). Well-financed schools can hire specialists to provide instruction in specific subject matter like art, music, and science; at such schools, a teacher will hand off their entire class to specialists for such units and then resume supervision of the class afterwards. This is distinct from the course model followed at the middle school, high school, and college levels, in which students enroll in various courses each semester which are usually taught in different classrooms by different teachers, and therefore must move from one classroom to the next during the school day.

== See also ==
- Education in the United States
- Homeschooling in the United States
- Secondary education in the United States
- Primary education
- Primary school
