= Fannie =

Fannie is a given name. Notable people with the name include:

== Notable female people with the name ==
- Fannie Almara Quain (1874–1950), American family physician and public health advocate
- Fannie B. Linderman (1875–1960), English-born American teacher of dramatic arts, entertainer, and writer
- Fannie Wylie (1894–1971), American teacher, office clerk, assistant bookkeeper, and politician from Nebraska
- Fannie Barrios (1964–2005), Venezuelan professional bodybuilder
- Fannie Battle (1842–1924), American social reformer and Confederate Army spy during the American Civil War
- Fannie Bayly King (1864–1951), American advocate for women's suffrage and social reforms
- Fannie Belle Fleming, birth name of Blaze Starr (1932–2015), American stripper and burlesque star
- Fannie Birckhead (1935–2022), American community organizer, judge, and politician
- Fannie Bishop Capen, American wife of Methodist missionary and evangelist Justus Henry Nelson
- Fannie Bloomfield Zeisler (1863–1927), Austrian-born American pianist
- Fannie Bourke (1886–1959), American stage- and film actress, suffragist, and motion picture exhibitor
- Fannie Brown Patrick (1864–1939), American musician, and leader in civic and social affairs
- Fannie Charles Dillon (1881–1947), American pianist, music educator, and composer
- Fannie Cobb Carter (1872–1973), American educator, humanitarian, and activist for school integration in America
- Fannie Criss (1867–1942), African-American dressmaker
- Fannie De Grasse Black (1856–1930), Canadian-born American singer and pianist
- Fannie Desforges, Canadian ice hockey player
- Fannie E. Hughey (1857–1929), American children's music teacher
- Fannie E. Motley, American schoolteacher and president of the National Association of Teachers in Colored Schools
- Fannie Edgar Thomas (1870–1925), American author
- Fannie Eliza Duvall (1861–1934), American painter
- Fannie Ellsworth Newberry (1848–1942), American children's writer
- Fannie Emanuel (1871–1934), American medical doctor and civic leader
- Fannie Farmer (1857–1915), American culinary expert and author
- Fannie Fern Andrews (1867–1950), American lecturer, teacher, social worker, and writer
- Fannie Flagg (born 1944), American actress, comedian, and author
- Fannie Forbis Russel (1846–1934), American pioneer, librarian, and educator
- Fannie Franklin Wall (c. 1860–1944), American clubwoman, civic leader, community activist, and children's home founder
- Fannie Gallaher (1854–1935), Irish writer, novelist, and teacher
- Fannie Gaston-Johansson (1938–2023), American professor of nursing
- Fannie P. Goldsmith (died 1931), American politician
- Fannie H. Marr (1835–1918), American author and poet
- Fannie Hardy Eckstorm (1865–1946), American writer, ornithologist, and folklorist
- Fannie Heaslip Lea (1884–1955), American author and poet
- Fannie Hertz, American wife of businessman, thoroughbred racehorse owner and breeder, and philanthropist John D. Hertz
- Fannie Hillsmith (1911–2007), American cubist painter
- Fannie Hopkins Hamilton (1882–1964), African-American dress maker and suffragist
- Fannie Hurst (1889–1968), American novelist and short-story writer
- Fannie Isabelle Sherrick, 19th-century American poet, essayist, and columnist
- Fannie Jacobs (1885–1977), American women's rights- and organized labor activist
- Fannie Jean Black, American clubwoman
- Fannie Kauffman, birth name of Vitola (actress) (1924–2009), Canadian-born Mexican comedian and actress
- Fannie Kay Bishop, American wife of businessman and politician Charles Pleasant Bishop
- Fannie Keenan, stage name of Dora Hand (c. 1844–1878), American dance hall singer and actress
- Fannie Knowling McNeil (1869–1928), Canadian suffragist and artist
- Fannie Lee Chaney (1921–2007), American baker turned civil rights activist
- Fannie Leslie (1856–1935), English music hall singer, dancer, and actress
- Fannie Lewis (1926–2008), American politician and civil rights activist
- Fannie Lorber (1881–1958), Russian-Jewish-born American philanthropist and community activist
- Fannie Lou Hamer (1917–1977), American voting- and women's rights activist, community organizer, and civil rights movement leader
- Fannie Lovering Skinner (1856–1938), American composer and singer
- Fannie M. Buzzell, American politician
- Fannie M. Richards (1840–1922), American educator
- Fannie Mae (disambiguation), several people
- Fannie Mahood Heath (1864–1931), American gardener
- Fannie May Goosby (1902–after 1934), American classic blues singer, pianist, and songwriter
- Fannie Morris Spencer (1865–1943), American composer and organist
- Fannie Nampeyo (1900–1987), American fine arts potter
- Fannie Ogden Ide, real name of Ruth Ogden (1853–1927), American children's book author
- Fannie Ostrander (1859–1921), American writer, editor, and critic
- Fannie Pennington (1914–2013), American activist, organizer, and fundraising coordinator
- Fannie Phelps Adams (1917–2016), American educator and activist
- Fannie Porter (1873–c. 1940), American brothel owner
- Fannie Quigley (1870–1944), American pioneer, prospector, and cook
- Fannie R. Buchanan (1875–1957), American musician and writer
- Fannie R. Givens (1861?–1947), American artist, missionary, political activist, and policewoman
- Fannie Ratchford (1887–1974), American librarian and scholar of 19th-century English literature
- Fannie Ruth Robinson (1847–1925), American author, poet, and educator
- Fannie Herrington (1869–1931), American politician
- Fannie S. Spitz (1873–1943), American inventor
- Fannie Salter (1882–1966), American lighthouse keeper
- Fannie Sellins (1872–1919), American union organizer
- Fannie Smith, several people
- Fannie Sperry Steele (1887–1983), American bronc rider and rodeo performer
- Fannie Stebbins (1858–1949), American science teacher and naturalist
- Fannie Tremblay (1885–1970), Canadian performer
- Fannie Ward (1872–1952), American vaudeville and silent film actress
- Fannie Williams, several people

== Notable male people with the name ==
- Fannie Masemola (born 1964), South African police officer and general

== See also ==
- Fannie Mae, a stockholder-owned corporation
- Fannie May, a brand of chocolates owned by 1-800-Flowers
- "Short Fat Fannie", a single by Larry Williams
- Fanny (given name)
