= List of essayists =

This is a list of essayists—people notable for their essay-writing.

Note: Birthplaces (as listed) do not always indicate nationality.

== A ==
- Augurio Abeto (1900–1977, Philippines)
- André Aciman (born 1951, Egypt)
- Joseph Addison (1672–1719, England)
- Theodor W. Adorno (1903–1969, Germany)
- Sheetal Agashe (born 1977, India)
- José de Alencar (1829–1877, Brazil)
- Kingsley Amis (1922–1995, United Kingdom)
- Martin Amis (1949–2023, United Kingdom)
- Oswald de Andrade (1890–1954, Brazil)
- Jacob M. Appel (born 1973, United States)
- Helena Araújo Ortiz (1934–2015, Colombia)
- Matthew Arnold (1822–1888, United Kingdom)
- Anastasia Ashman (born 1964, United States)
- Margaret Atwood (born 1939, Canada)
- Isaac Asimov (1920–1992, Russia)
- W. H. Auden (1907–1973, United Kingdom)
- Joxe Azurmendi (1941–2025, Spain)

== B ==
- Rebeca Baceiredo (born 1979, Spain)
- Rambriksh Benipuri (1902–1968, India)
- Francis Bacon (1561–1626, England)
- Walter Bagehot (1826–1877, England)
- James Baldwin (1924–1987, United States)
- Anna Laetitia Barbauld (1743–1825, England)
- John Perry Barlow (1947–2018, United States)
- Julian Barnes (born 1946, United Kingdom)
- Jacques Barzun (1907–2012, France)
- Enis Batur (born 1952, Turkey)
- Charles Baudelaire (1821–1867, France)
- Hilaire Belloc (1870–1953, United Kingdom)
- Walter Benjamin (1892–1940, Germany)
- Wendell Berry (born 1934, United States)
- Jens Bjørneboe (1920–1976, Norway)
- Jorge Luis Borges (1899–1986, Argentina)
- Alain de Botton (born 1969, Switzerland)
- Giannina Braschi (born 1953, Puerto Rico)
- William Brandon (1914–2002, United States)
- Alfred Brendel (1931–2025, Czech Republic)
- Christopher Buckley (born 1952, United States)
- Anthony Burgess (1917–1993, United Kingdom)
- Richard de Bury (1287–1345, England)

== C-D ==
- Erskine Caldwell (1903–2007, United States)
- Italo Calvino (1923–1985, Italy)
- Albert Camus (1913–1960, Algeria)
- Rafael Cansinos Assens (1882–1964, Spain)
- Orson Scott Card (born 1951, United States)
- John Carey (born 1934, United Kingdom)
- Simon Carmiggelt (1913–1987, Netherlands)
- Otto Maria Carpeaux (1900–1978, Austria)
- Harriet Frances Carpenter (1868/75 – 1956, United States)
- Saveria Chemotti (born 1947, Italy)
- Kelly Cherry (1940–2022, United States)
- G. K. Chesterton (1874–1936, United Kingdom)
- Panashe Chigumadzi (DOB unknown, living, Zimbabwe)
- Noam Chomsky (born 1928, United States)
- Winston Churchill (1874–1965, Great Britain)
- Emil Cioran (1911–1995, Romania)
- J. M. Coetzee (born 1940, South Africa)
- William Cobbett (1763–1835, Great Britain)
- Anthony Collins (1676–1729, England)
- Charles Caleb Colton (1780–1832, Great Britain)
- Cyril Connolly (1903–1974, United Kingdom)
- Abraham Cowley (1618–1667, Great Britain)
- A. J. Cronin (1896–1981, Scotland)
- Samuel McChord Crothers (1857–1927, United States)
- Richard Dawkins (born 1941, United Kingdom)
- Mike Daisey (born 1976, United States)
- Theodore Dalrymple (born 1949, United Kingdom)
- Nik De Dominic (born 1981, United States)
- Joan Didion (1934–2021, United States)
- Annie Dillard (born 1945, United States)
- Babacar Sedikh Diouf (born 1928, Senegal)
- Alfred Döblin (1878–1957, Germany)
- John Dolan (1955–1981, United States)
- Joe Dolce (born 1947, Australia)
- Denis Donoghue (1928–2021, Ireland)
- John Dryden (1631–1700, England)

== E-G ==
- Klaus Ebner (born 1964, Austria)
- Umberto Eco (1932–2016, Italy)
- T. S. Eliot (1888–1965, United States)
- Ralph Waldo Emerson (1803–1882, United States)
- Joseph Epstein (born 1937, United States)
- Filip Erceg (born 1979, Croatia)
- Barbara Ehrenreich (1941–2022, United States)
- Jaime Eyzaguirre (1908–1968, Chile)
- Anne Fadiman (born 1953, United States)
- Femi Fani-Kayode (born 1960, Nigeria)
- Frantz Fanon (1925–1961, Martinique)
- Richard Farmer (1735–1797, England)
- Gérard Fauré (born 1946, Morocco)
- Benito Jerónimo Feijoo e Montenegro (1676–1764, Spain)
- Lawrence Ferlinghetti (1919–2021, United States)
- Predrag Finci (born 1946, Bosnia and Herzegovina)
- Élisabeth de Fontenay (born 1934, France)
- E. M. Forster (1879–1970, England)
- John Foster (1770–1843, United Kingdom)
- Ian Frazier (born 1951, United States)
- Robert Fulghum (born 1937, United States)
- Joan Fuster (1922–1992, Spain)
- Harry Gamboa, Jr. (born 1951, United States)
- William H. Gass (1924–2017, United States)
- Karl-Markus Gauß (born 1954, Austria)
- Malcolm Gladwell (born 1963, United Kingdom)
- Adam Gopnik (born 1956, United States)
- Stephen Jay Gould (1941–2002, United States)
- Mohammed Lotfy Gomaa (1886–1953, Egypt)
- Paul Graham (born 1964, England)
- Clement Greenberg (1909–1994, United States)
- A. C. Grayling (born 1949, United Kingdom)
- Gordon Grice (born 1965, United States)
- Stanka Gjurić (born 1966, Croatia)

== H-J ==
- Carla Harryman (born 1952, United States)
- William Hazlitt (1778–1830, England)
- Peter Handke (born 1942 Griffen, Austria)
- Saeko Himuro (1957–2008, Japan)
- Fumi Hirano (born 1955, Japan)
- Christopher Hitchens (1949–2011, United Kingdom)
- Peter Hitchens (born 1951, United Kingdom)
- Hugh Hood (1928–2000, Canada)
- Langston Hughes (1902–1967, United States)
- David Hume (1711–1776, United Kingdom)
- Hamid Rashidi (1961–2020, Iran)
- Leigh Hunt (1784–1859, England)
- Aldous Leonard Huxley (1894–1963, England)
- Lucie Fulton Isaacs (1841–1916, United States)
- Shigesato Itoi (born 1948, Japan)
- Molly Ivins (1944–2007, United States)
- Jwalamukhi (1938–2008, India)
- Michael Johns (born 1964, United States)
- Diane Johnson (born 1934, United States)
- Electa Amanda Wright Johnson (1938–1929, United States)
- Samuel Johnson (1709–1784, England)
- June Jordan (1936–2002, United States)
- Rebecca Richardson Joslin (1846–1934, United States)

== K-L ==
- Steven G. Kellman (born 1947, United States)
- Ted Kaczynski (1942–2023, United States)
- Shakuntala Karandikar (1931–2018, India)
- Frank Kermode (1919–2010, United Kingdom)
- Tracy Kidder (born 1945, United States)
- Chuck Klosterman (born 1972, United States)
- Rudy Kousbroek (1929–2010, Netherlands)
- Hans Krieger (1933–2023, Germany)
- Miroslav Krleža (1893–1981, Croatia)
- Tomislav Ladan (1932–2008, Serbia)
- Laila Lalami (born 1968, Morocco)
- Anne Richelieu Lamb (1807–1878, Scotland)
- Charles Lamb (1775–1834, England)
- Shankar Lamichhane (Nepal)
- Anne Lamott (born 1954, United States)
- Corinne Lee (United States)
- Gottfried Leibniz (1646–1716, Germany)
- Albert Leung (born 1961, Hong Kong)
- C. S. Lewis (1898–1963, Ireland)
- Li Ao (1935–2018, China, Taiwan)
- Liang Shiqiu (1903–1987, China, Taiwan)
- Lin Yutang (1895–1976, China, Taiwan, Hong Kong)
- Alan Lightman (born 1948, United States)
- Tim Lilburn (born 1950, Canada)
- Lin Wenyue (1933–2023, Taiwan)
- Joan Lindsay (1896–1984, Australia)
- María López Sández (born 1973, Spain)
- E. V. Lucas (1868–1938, England)
- Lu Xun (1881–1936, China)

== M-N ==
- Maurice Maeterlinck (1862–1949), Belgium)
- Norman Mailer (1923–2007, United States)
- Jorge Majfud (born 1969, Uruguay)
- Laura Mancinelli (1933–2016, Italy)
- Francis T. McAndrew (born 1953, Germany)
- Nathan McCall (born 1955, United States)
- Mary McCarthy (1912–1989, United States)
- John McPhee (born 1931, United States)
- Louis Menand (born 1952, United States)
- H. L. Mencken (1880–1956, United States)
- Arthur Miller (1915–2005, United States)
- Pankaj Mishra (born 1969, India)
- Donald Grant Mitchell (1822–1908, United States)
- Michel de Montaigne (1533–1592, France)
- Angela Morales (born 1966, United States)
- Michele Moramarco (born 1953, Italy)
- V. S. Naipaul (1932–2018, Trinidad and Tobago)
- Nakane Kōtei (1839–1913, Japan)
- Ukichiro Nakaya (1900–1962, Japan)
- Marie NDiaye (born 1967, France)
- John Neal (1793–1876, United States)
- Virgil Nemoianu (1940–2025, Romania)
- Natias Neutert (born 1947, Germany)
- Kathleen Norris (born 1947, United States)

== O-R ==
- Joyce Carol Oates (born 1938, United States)
- George Orwell (1903–1950, United Kingdom)
- Borislav Pekić (1930–1992, Serbia)
- Noel Perrin (1927–2004, United States)
- Samuel F. Pickering Jr. (born 1941, United States)
- Stanley Plumly (1939–2019, United States)
- Mestrius Plutarch (46–127, Boeotia, Ancient Greece)
- Edgar Allan Poe (1809–1849, United States)
- Katherine Ann Porter (1890–1980, United States)
- Rebecca N. Porter (1883-1963, United States)
- Anna M. Longshore Potts (1829–1912, United States)
- J.B. Priestley (1894–1984, England)
- Kevin Prufer (born 1969, United States)
- Thomas de Quincey (1785–1859, England)
- Indra Bahadur Rai (1927–2018, India)
- Fanny Raoul (1771–1833, France)
- María del Carmen Reina Jiménez (born 1942, Spain)
- Emily Browne Powell (1847-1938, United States)
- Gabrielle Réval (1869–1938, France)
- Kenneth Rexroth (1905–1985, United States)
- Marilynne Robinson (born 1943, United States)
- Tjalie Robinson (1911–1974, Netherlands)
- Richard Rodriguez (born 1944, United States)
- Arundhati Roy (born 1961, India)
- Bertrand Russell (1872–1970, United Kingdom)

== S ==
- Rahul Sankrityayan (1893–1963, India)
- Edward Said (1935–2003, Palestine)
- John Ralston Saul (born 1947, Canada)
- Dan Schneider (born 1965, United States)
- Robert Schumann (1810–1856, Germany)
- Roger Scruton (1944–2020, England)
- David Sedaris (born 1956, United States)
- John Robert Seeley (1834–1895, England)
- Rafael Calvo Serer (1916–1988, Spain)
- George Bernard Shaw (1856–1950, Ireland)
- Percy Bysshe Shelley (1792–1822, England)
- Fannie Isabelle Sherrick (fl. 1860–1880, United States)
- David Shields (born 1956, United States)
- Clay Shirky (born 1964, United States)
- Simeon Simev (born 1949, Republic of Macedonia)
- Ramdhari Singh 'Dinkar' (1908–1974, India)
- Matias Skard (1846–1927, Norway)
- Jean Edward Smith (1932–2019, United States)
- Zadie Smith (born 1975, England)
- Amelia Solar de Claro (1836–1915, Chile)
- Walid Soliman (born 1975, Tunisia)
- Rebecca Solnit (born 1961, United States)
- Susan Sontag (1933–2004, United States)
- Dejan Stojanović (born 1959, Serbia)
- Lytton Strachey (1880–1932, United Kingdom)
- Cheryl Strayed (born 1968, United States)

== T-Z ==
- Rabindranath Tagore (1861–1941, India)
- Nassim Nicholas Taleb (born 1960, Lebanon)
- Alain Tasso (born 1962, Lebanon)
- Vijay Tendulkar (1928–2008, India)
- Issa Laye Thiaw (1943–2017, Senegal)
- Colm Tóibín (born 1955, Ireland)
- Leo Tolstoy (1828–1910, Russia)
- Lionel Trilling (1905–1975, United States)
- George W. S. Trow (1943–2006, United States)
- Andrew Vachss (1942–2021, United States)
- Paul Valéry (1871–1945, France)
- Erico Verissimo (1905–1975, Brazil)
- Gore Vidal (1925–2012, United States)
- Voltaire (1694–1778, France)
- Kurt Vonnegut (1922–2007, United States)
- Richard Wagner (1813–1883, Germany)
- David Foster Wallace (1962–2008, United States)
- Rebecca West (1892–1983, United Kingdom)
- E. B. White (1899–1985, United States)
- Oscar Wilde (1852–1900, Ireland)
- Tom Wolfe (1931–2018, United States)
- Virginia Woolf (1882–1941, United Kingdom)
- Yang Jiang (1911–2016, China)
- Marguerite Yourcenar (1903–1987, France)
- Asunción de Zea-Bermúdez (1862–1936, Spain)
