= Fani =

Fani may refer to:

- Fani, Mali, a town in Mali
- Fani, one of the Asia Islands in eastern Indonesia
- Cyclone Fani, a North Indian Ocean tropical cyclone in 2019

== People with the name ==
- Fani Badayuni (1879-1961), Urdu poet
- Fani Chalkia (born 1979), Greek athlete
- Fani Madida (born 1966), South African footballer
- Fani Papageorgiou (born 1975), Greek poet and critic
- Fani Stipković (born 1982), Croatian television reporter
- Fani Willis, US district attorney for the Fulton County, Georgia
- Jamshid Fani, Iranian boxer
- Leonora Fani (born 1954), Italian film actress
- Mohsin Fani, 17th-century Persian historian
- Nadia El Fani (born 1960), French-Tunisian film director

== See also ==
- Fanni (disambiguation)
- Fany (disambiguation)
- Fanny (disambiguation)
- Fannie
- Feni (disambiguation)
