= Fannie (disambiguation) =

Fannie may refer to:

- Fannie, a feminine given name (with a list of people named Fannie)
- Fannie (pilot boat), 19th-century pilot boat

== See also ==
- Fanni (disambiguation)
- Fanny (disambiguation)
