= Edwin Brainard =

Edwin Brainard may refer to:

- Edwin H. Brainard (1882–1957), United States Marine Corps officer
- J. Edwin Brainard (1857–1942), Lieutenant governor of Connecticut
