= Fanni =

Fanni may refer to:

== People ==
=== Given name ===
- Fanni Vivien Fabian, Hungarian swimmer and bronze medalist at the 2017 European Youth Summer Olympic Festival
- Fanni Blathy (22 March 1873 – 22 December 1949) Czechoslovak politician
- Fanni Gasparics (born 1994), Hungarian ice hockey player
- Fanni Gyarmati (1912–2014), wife of Hungarian teacher and poet Miklós Radnóti
- Fanni Gyurinovics (born 2001), Hungarian swimmer
- Fanni Illes, Hungarian swimmer in the 2008 Summer Paralympics
- Fanni Juhász, Hungarian pole vaulter and bronze medalist at the 2000 World Junior Championships in Athletics
- Fanni Kenyeres (born 1978), Hungarian handball player
- Fanni Kövér (born 15 February 2004) Hungrian athlete at the Hungarian Athletics Championships
- Fanni Kriess (born 12 April 1989) Hungrian fencer
- Fanni Luukkonen (1882–1947), Finnish leader of the Lotta Svärd
- Fanni Matula, Hungarian swimmer and silver medalist at the 2017 European Youth Summer Olympic Festival
- Fanni Metelius (born 1987), Swedish actress in the 2014 international film Force Majeure
- Fanni Nizalowski, harpist for the Hungarian band Passed
- Fanni Pigniczki (born 23 January 2000) Hungrian rhythmic gymnast
- Fanni Rapai (born 7 January 2000) Hungarian track and field athlete at the 2023 World Athletics Championships
- Fanni Szalai (born 21 January 2008) is a Hungarian triathlete and long-distance runner

=== Surname ===
- Csutorás Fanni and Hutlassa Fanni, members of the Hungarian basketball team PEAC-Pécs
- Rod Fanni (born 1981), French soccer player
- Salvatore Fanni (born 1964), Italian boxer

== Animals ==
- Fanni (chimpanzee) (born 1981), member of the Kasakela chimpanzee community in Gombe National Park, Tanzania

== See also ==
- Fani (disambiguation)
- Fanny (disambiguation)
- Fannie (disambiguation)
  - Fannie, a feminine given name
