= Swedenborg Rite =

Hermetic fraternal order circa 1773-1908

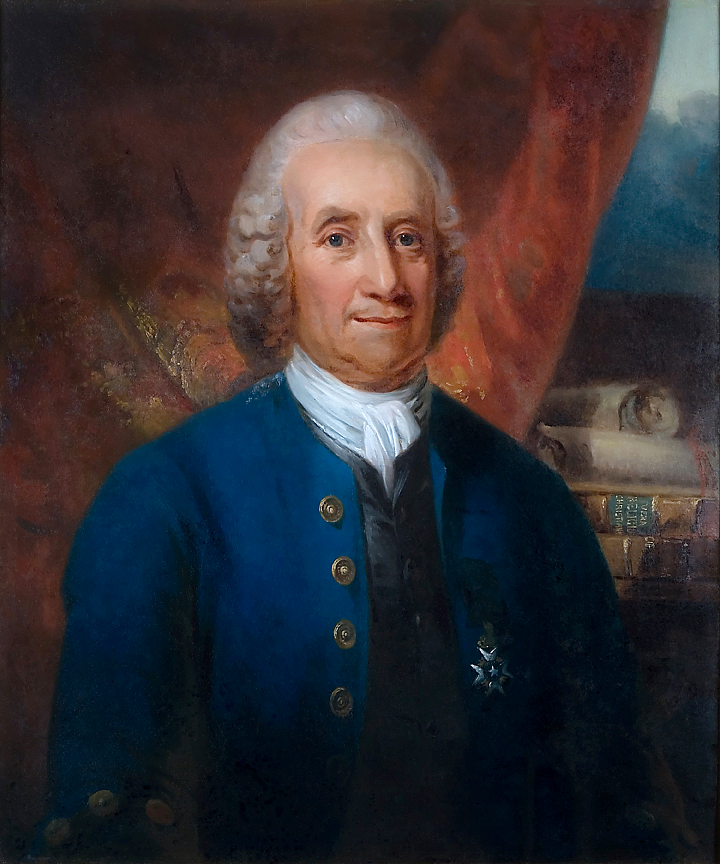
Emanuel Swedenborg (1688–1772), the fraternity's namesake

The Swedenborg Rite or Rite of Swedenborg was a French fraternal order modeled on Freemasonry and based upon the teachings of Emanuel Swedenborg (1688–1772). It comprised six Degrees: Apprentice, Fellow Craft, Master Neophyte, Illuminated Theosophite, Blue Brother, and Red Brother.

It was created in Avignon in 1773 by the Marquis de Thorn. It was initially a political organization, although the political ideology was eventually discarded from the rite. This version of the Swedenborg Rite died out within a decade of its founding.

Starting in the 1870s, the Rite was resurrected as an hermetic organization. This version faded out sometime around 1908. In 1982, a patent of the Swedenborg Rite was transmitted by the English Freemason Desmond Bourke, in his office at the British Museum, to Masonic author Michele Moramarco, who after revising the rituals by Bourke's permission revived that tradition in Italy under the title of "Antico Rito Noachita" ("Ancient Noachide Rite")
