= Fany =

Fany is a given name or hypocorism and may refer to:

- Fany Pfumo (also spelled Mpfumo) (1928–1987), a Mozambican-born singer active in South Africa
- Fany Pérez Gutiérrez (born 1967), a Mexican politician from the National Action Party
- Fany Gauto (born 1992), a Paraguayan professional footballer
- Fany Chalas (born 1993), a Dominican sprinter
- Fanny Puyesky (also spelled Fany) (1939–2010), a lawyer, writer, and dramatist known as "the first feminist" of Uruguay

== See also ==
- CK Příbram Fany Gastro, a Czech road cycling team
- Fanny (disambiguation)
- Fanny (name)
- FANY, a women's volunteer organization connected with the British military
