= NCST =

NCST may refer to:

- National Community Stabilization Trust in the United States
- National Centre for Software Technology in India, now Centre for Development of Advanced Computing (C-DAC)
- National College of Science and Technology in the Philippines
- New Castle School of Trades in the United States
- National Construction Safety Team in the United States, fielded as needed by NIST
- National Commission for Scheduled Tribes in India
