= Fannie Mae (disambiguation) =

Topics referred to by the same term

Fannie Mae is a government-backed financial services company.

Fannie Mae or Fannie May may also refer to:

- Fannie Mae Clackum (1929–2014), American Air Force personnel
- Fannie Mae Duncan (1918–2005), African-American entrepreneur, philanthropist, and community activist
- Fannie May Goosby (1902–unknown), American classic female blues singer, pianist and songwriter
- Fannie Mae (song), a 1959 song by Buster Brown
- Fannie May, a chocolate brand
