= Edwin H. Brainard =

United States Marine Corps officer (1882–1957)

Edwin Halstead Brainard
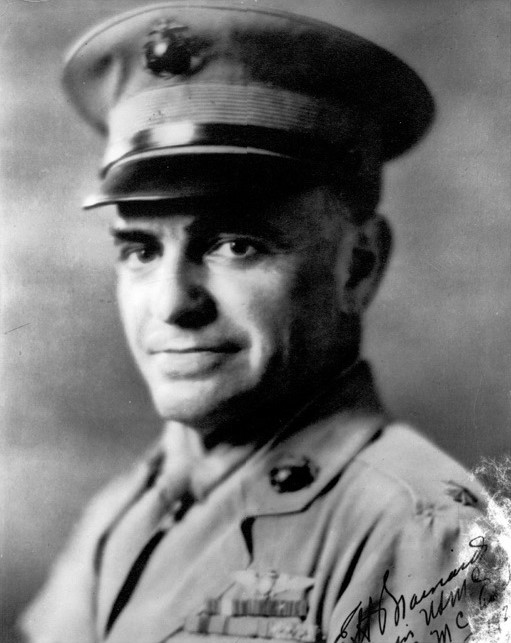
- Nickname: "Chief"
- Born: September 6, 1882; Branford, Connecticut, US
- Died: February 27, 1957 (aged 74) Pinellas County, Florida, US
- Buried: Arlington National Cemetery
- Allegiance: United States of America
- Branch: United States Marine Corps
- Service years: 1909–1929
- Rank: Major
- Conflicts: World War I; Banana Wars; Occupation of Haiti; Occupation of Nicaragua
- Awards: Navy Cross; Silver Star (2)
- Other work: Vice President of Curtiss Flying Service

Edwin Halstead Brainard (September 6, 1882 – February 27, 1957) was a United States Marine Corps officer who was awarded the Navy Cross during World War I. He was also a Marine aviation pioneer during the 1920s and set many records.

== Early life and World War I ==
Brainard was born on September 6, 1882, in Branford, Connecticut. He was the son of Connecticut businessman and politician J. Edwin Brainard, who later served as a member of the General Assembly and as Lieutenant Governor. The younger Brainard was called Halstead in his youth. He graduated from the New York Nautical School and commissioned as a second lieutenant in the Marine Corps in January 1909.

During World War I, Major Brainard served as the battalion commander of the 1st Battalion, 15th Field Artillery Regiment in France. During the Champagne Offensive in October 1918, he unhesitatingly moved his battalion forward under heavy artillery fire and directed accurate counterfire at the enemy. Major Brainard was awarded the Navy Cross and a Silver Star for his actions.

On November 3, Major Brainard constantly exposed himself to enemy artillery fire, increasing the morale of his men and the accuracy of his guns. For his leadership, he was awarded a second Silver Star. Additionally, the French government awarded Brainard the Croix de Guerre.

== Naval aviation career ==
After the war, Major Brainard earned his wings at Naval Air Station Pensacola, Florida, in December 1920. Throughout the 1920s, he became a well-known aviator and made several groundbreaking flights. Brainard made a transcontinental round-trip flight in a Curtiss Hawk, and set the record for the longest flight with a seaplane when he flew from Washington, D.C. to Haiti.

In March 1925, Major Brainard was made the Officer in Charge, Aviation for all Marine aircraft, replacing Lieutenant Colonel Thomas C. Turner. During his tenure, he directed the expansion of the Marine Aviation Reserve and called for the recruitment of more pilots. In September 1926, he defined three tactical missions for Marine aircraft. “Observation” was the first mission and included aerial photography and artillery spotting. The second mission was “light bombardment,” which consisted of bombing and strafing the enemy. The third mission included air-to-air combat for control of the skies and was called “fighting aviation.”

On January 17, 1927, Major Brainard flew from Washington, D.C., to Pensacola, Florida, in 6 hours 45 minutes. A few days later, he made the return trip in just 5 hours 25 minutes. Brainard set a record time of 2 hours 5 minutes from Buffalo, New York, to Washington, D.C., leading a formation of Curtiss Hawks. On September 18, 1927, he placed first in a seaplane race in New Haven, Connecticut.

In December 1927, Major Brainard obtained the Marine Corps’ first cargo plane, a Fokker Trimotor from Atlantic Aircraft, and made the first flight across the Caribbean. He and the crew were flying from Miami to Nicaragua, but were forced to land in Honduras when they ran low on fuel. They finished the trip the next day, arriving in Managua on December 4.

== Post-Marine Corps life ==
In May 1929, Major Brainard left the Marine Corps in order to take the position of Vice President at Curtiss Flying Service.

In November 1931, Brainard was an honorary pallbearer at Colonel Thomas C. Turner's funeral in Arlington National Cemetery. Turner had assumed the position of Officer in Charge, Aviation after Brainard's exit from the Marines. Turner was killed when he was struck by an aircraft propeller in Haiti.

In November 1951, his nephew George Spencer Brainard, who had also become a Naval Aviator, was killed in a crash landing aboard the carrier USS Antietam during the Korean War.

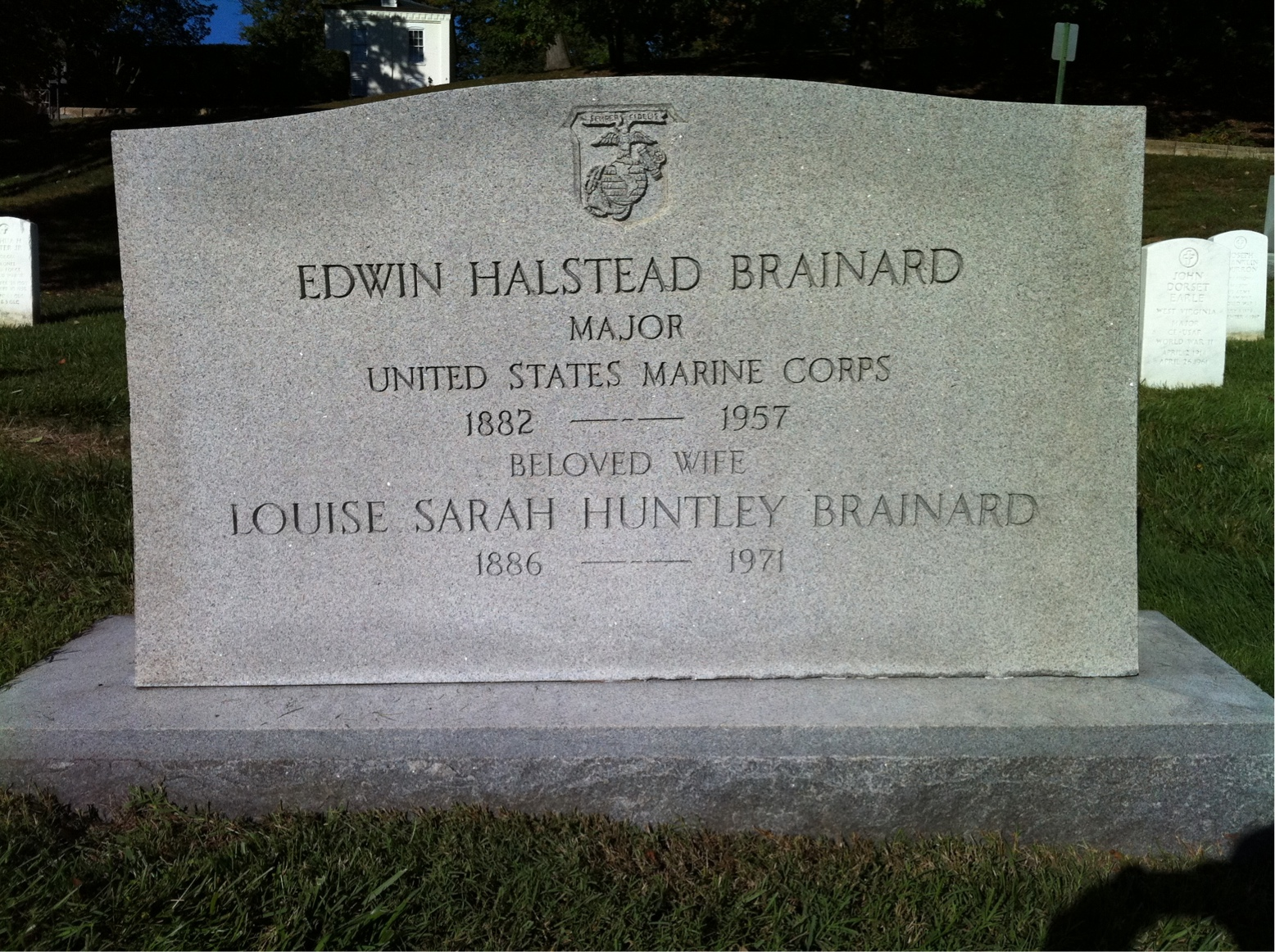
Grave of Brainard at Arlington National Cemetery

Edwin H. Brainard died on February 27, 1957, in Pinellas County, Florida. He was buried in Arlington National Cemetery.

== See also ==
- Alfred A. Cunningham – early USMC aviator

Military offices
Preceded by Thomas C. Turner	Officer in Charge, Aviation; March 3, 1925 – May 9, 1929	Succeeded by Thomas C. Turner
