= Thomas C. Turner =

United States Marine Corps officer

Thomas Caldwell Turner
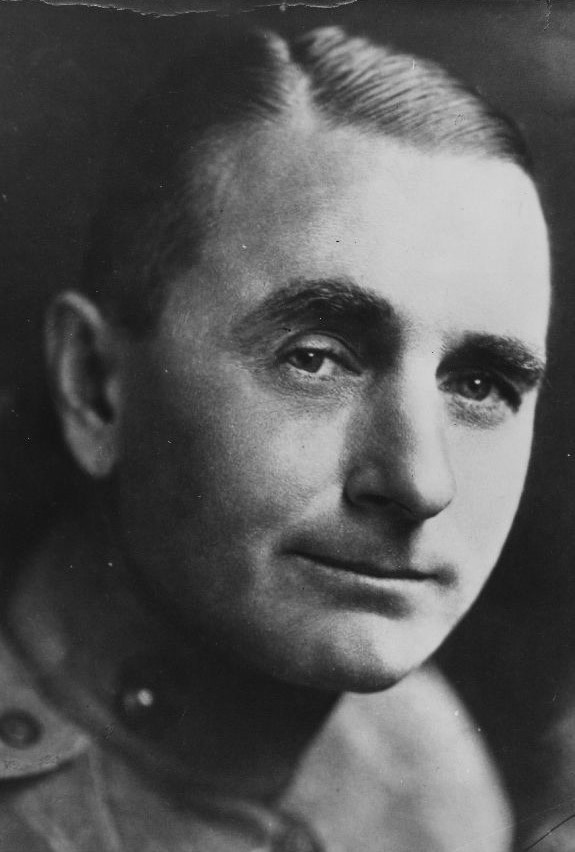
- Born: March 29, 1882; Mare Island, California, U.S.
- Died: October 28, 1931 (aged 49) Port-au-Prince, Haiti
- Buried: Arlington National Cemetery; Arlington, Virginia
- Allegiance: United States of America
- Branch: United States Marine Corps
- Service years: 1901–1931
- Rank: Colonel
- Commands: Officer in Charge, Aviation
- Conflicts: Philippine–American War; Banana Wars: Battle of Veracruz; Occupation of Haiti; Occupation of the Dominican Republic
- Awards: Distinguished Flying Cross

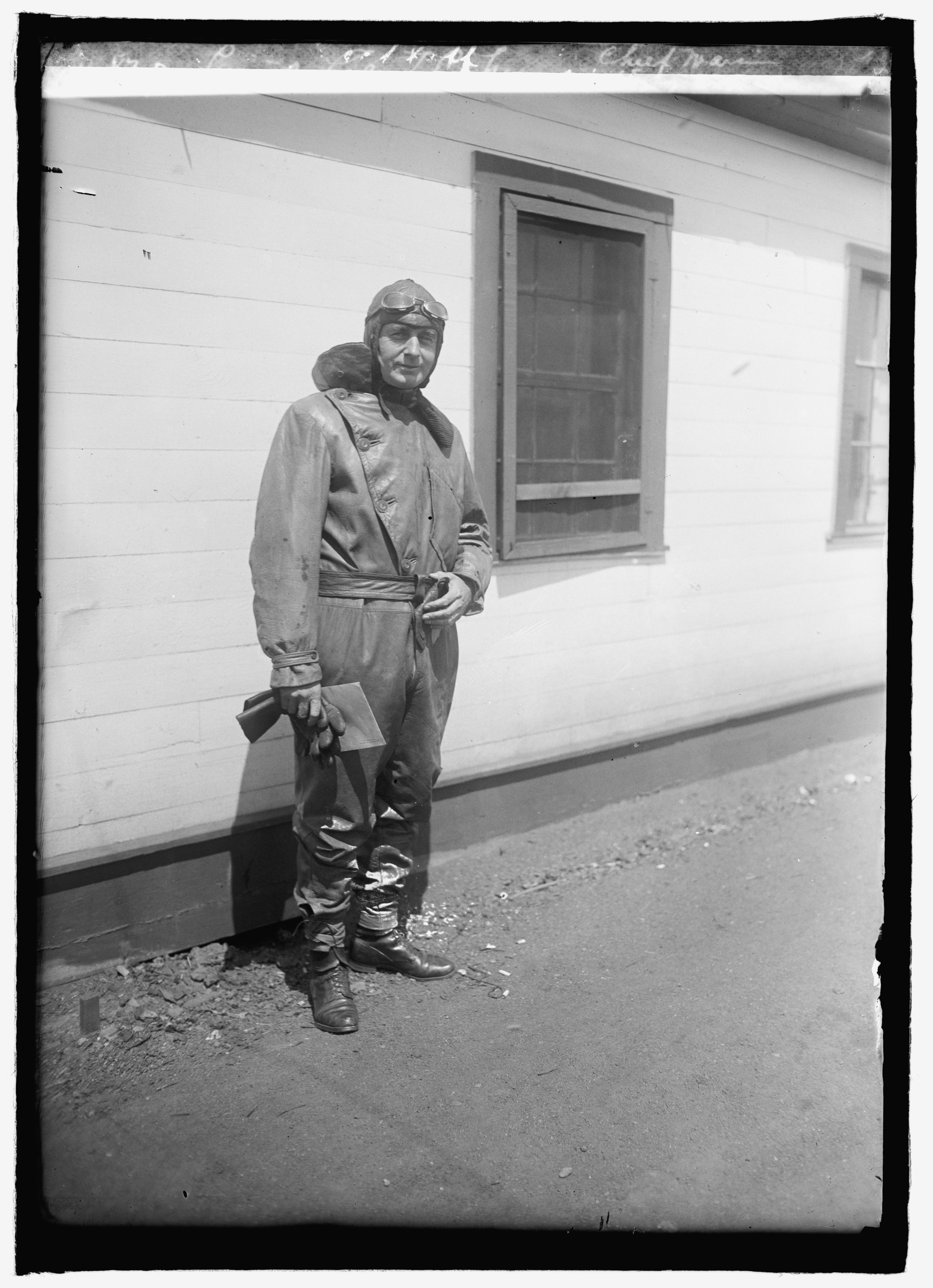
Lt. Col. Turner wearing flight gear in 1923

Thomas Caldwell Turner (March 29, 1882 – October 28, 1931) was a United States Marine Corps Colonel who was a Marine aviation pioneer. He was killed in an accident while serving as the Officer in Charge, Aviation, a position which is currently known as the Deputy Commandant for Aviation.

== Early career ==
Thomas C. Turner was born on March 29, 1882, in Mare Island, California. Enlisting in the Marine Corps in 1901, he was commissioned as a second lieutenant a year later.

Turner served overseas in the Philippines and Puerto Rico, before taking part in the battle of Veracruz in 1914. Turner was an aviation enthusiast and learned how to fly in his free time while he was the commanding officer of the Marine Barracks at San Diego.

== Marine aviation career ==
In 1917, he was promoted to major. The Marine Corps also approved a request for Turner to be temporarily assigned to the Army Signal Corps. While assigned to the Signal Corps, he held command of Ellington Field, an Army Air Station in Houston, Texas. On March 14, 1918, Turner earned his wings and was designated as Naval Aviator #772. He was also designated as the 73rd Marine aviator. In May 1918 Lt.Col Turner assumed command of Barron Field outside of Fort Worth, Texas and was still in command when the Barron Filed Review was written in 1919.

In October 1919, Turner was given orders to take part in combat operations against bandits with the First Provisional Marine Regiment in Haiti. When he left Haiti in 1920, Lieutenant Colonel Turner was the senior ranking Marine aviator. Turner's friend, Commandant John A. Lejeune, appointed him as the Officer in Charge, Aviation for the Marine Corps in December 1920. He would fill this position until March 1925. On April 22, 1921, Turner set a record for the longest flight ever made by a Marine or Naval aviator when he led two Airco DH-4s on a flight from Washington, D.C. to Santo Domingo and back. For this flight, Turner was awarded the Distinguished Flying Cross.

Turner later went to China to command the Marine aviation elements of the 3rd Brigade. Supporting the peace-keeping operations in China, the Marine squadrons flew nearly 4,000 sorties. These sorties included conducting photographic reconnaissance of Chinese forces and transporting mail and passengers. Brigadier General Smedley Butler praised Turner and his aviators for their service in China. In May 1929, Turner, now a colonel, was again made the Officer in Charge, Aviation.

== Death ==
On October 22, 1931, Colonel Turner flew a new amphibious boat plane, the Sikorsky RS-1, to the Marine headquarters in Haiti. On October 26, he made a normal landing at a beach in Gonaïves, Haiti. The port landing gear sank into the sand about two feet, and Turner exited the plane to inspect the damage. Turner did not take into account the depth the landing gear had sunk, and, consequently, the difference in height above ground between the number 1 and number 2 engines when he walked by the propeller, and he was struck in the side of the head and critically injured. He died two days later on October 28 in a field hospital in Port-au-Prince. At the time, Turner was one of the best-known aviators in the Marine Corps. Turner was also due to be promoted to brigadier general, which would have made him the first Marine aviator to hold that rank.

Turner's body was returned to the United States and he was laid to rest in Arlington National Cemetery on November 5, 1931. Major Roy Geiger replaced Turner as the Officer in Charge, Aviation on November 6. The position was left unfilled for nine days due to the untimely death of Colonel Turner.

Turner Field at Marine Corps Air Facility Quantico was named in his honor. The 1st Marine Aircraft Wing was later formed on Turner Field in July 1941.

Military offices
Preceded by Alfred A. Cunningham	Officer in Charge, Aviation; December 13, 1920 – March 2, 1925; First term	Succeeded by Edwin H. Brainard
Preceded by Edwin H. Brainard	Officer in Charge, Aviation; May 10, 1929 – October 28, 1931; Second term	Succeeded by Roy Geiger
