= National Community Stabilization Trust =

National Community Stabilization Trust (NCST)
- Type: Non Profit
- Founded: 2008
- Headquarters: Washington, D.C., United States
- Website: www.ncst.org

The National Community Stabilization Trust (NCST or Stabilization Trust) is a Washington, D.C.–based non-profit organization that facilitates the transfer of foreclosed and abandoned properties from financial institutions nationwide to local housing organizations to promote property reuse and neighborhood stability. According to U.S. Banker, the Stabilization Trust was "created to act as a middleman between cities looking to acquire abandoned properties and the lenders looking to unload them."

The Stabilization Trust was founded in 2008 in response to America’s foreclosure crisis following the bursting of the housing bubble. Christopher J. Tyson serves as President and Lot Diaz of UnidosUS is the chairman of the Board of Managers. The Trust's goal is to help local community development organizations, land banks, and other mission-focused nonprofit or municipal organizations acquire, manage, rehabilitate, and sell foreclosed property to ensure homeownership and rental housing are available to low-and moderate-income families. The Stabilization Trust also provides greater access to flexible financing for neighborhood stabilization activities.

The organization has often been cited in the media on topics such as maximizing use of the U.S. Department of Housing and Urban Development's (HUD) Neighborhood Stabilization Program grants.

== History and successes ==
The Stabilization Trust was formed in 2008 through a collaboration of six national community development non-profit organizations: Enterprise Community Partners, Inc., Housing Partnership Network, Local Initiatives Support Corporation (LISC), UnidosUS (formerly National Council of La Raza), National Urban League, and NeighborWorks America.

The Stabilization Trust piloted its REO Property Acquisition program in Minneapolis, Minnesota, and Saint Paul, Minnesota in early 2009. The organization worked with the two cities to successfully transfer more than 230 foreclosed or abandoned properties within its first year. The Minnesota Post reported that the Trust "acts as a national clearinghouse to streamline communications. It serves as a single point of contact. Every day, participating institutions give the Trust a master list of properties that will come on the market soon. The Trust then forwards the information to partner organizations, which get a first look before they go on sale publicly."

Since its pilot, the Stabilization Trust has expanded its program to 115 NSP-funded local buyers representing more than 250 localities across 38 states.

In Florida, Hillsborough County partnered with the Stabilization Trust to learn about foreclosed properties and to move on them before private investors know they are available.

In Baltimore, St. Ambrose Housing Aid Center and Habitat for Humanity signed on with the Stabilization Trust to simplify the buying process. The Trust has hammered out agreements with major lenders to standardize acquisitions and let recipients of federal Neighborhood Stabilization Program funding get a first look at new foreclosures.

Las Vegas County also began working with the Stabilization Trust to get a "first look" at properties by receiving filtered properties in target ZIP codes via e-mail. Using the Trust's system, in only two weeks, sellers accepted offers on an additional five houses. A Vegas County housing official said working with the trust is the sort of tweak that may move the Neighborhood Stabilization Program closer to its goals, but the rate at which this occurs depends on how many banks work with the trust, and how many houses banks release onto the trusts's lists.

The Utah Center for Affordable Housing said the Stabilization Trust was key to its effort to buy homes at a deep discount.

Philadelphia's stabilization program picked up steam through working with the Stabilization Trust by getting increased access to Chase bank properties. In the U.S. Banker article, Nickerson is quoted as saying, "We have working relationships with all the big players – Bank of America, Wells Fargo, Chase, Citi, Fannie, Freddie, GMAC, and others."

The Stabilization Trust has received major support from the Ford Foundation and MacArthur Foundation, among other leaders in the philanthropic community. The Ford Foundation's contribution is reportedly among the largest so-called program-related investments by a foundation.

On June 24, 2021, President Biden nominated NCST president Julia Gordon to be Commissioner of the Federal Housing Administration.

== Programs ==
The Stabilization Trust serves as a bridge between financial institutions and localities by streamlining and standardizing the process of transferring bank-owned foreclosed properties – commonly known as Real Estate Owned (REO) – to local government and nonprofits. The Stabilization Trust accomplishes this goal in two ways:

=== Assistance with acquiring properties ===
The Stabilization Trust helps state and local programs acquire foreclosed and abandoned properties from financial institutions through its REO Property Acquisition Program by:

- Acting as a single point of contact with the leading financial institutions holding and managing these properties, thus saving considerable time and effort for local housing providers seeking to acquire foreclosed and abandoned houses.
- Providing a standardized and simplified process for receiving property listings and evaluating pricing offers from financial institutions.
- Offering first-look access to properties by allowing localities an opportunity to evaluate properties before they are more broadly marketed.

=== Flexible financing ===
The Stabilization Trust REO Capital Fund LLC, the financing arm of the National Community Stabilization Trust, provides specially tailored loan products to administrators of local neighborhood stabilization programs. Using philanthropic and public sources to leverage private capital for neighborhood stabilization activities, the REO Capital Fund was created to help municipalities and community-based organizations finance the acquisition, rehabilitation and interim holding of distressed properties to maximize their on-the-ground impact in neighborhoods hard hit by the foreclosure crisis. In addition, the REO Capital Fund provides short-term bridge financing of government receivables pursuant to an award of federal Neighborhood Stabilization Program (NSP) funds. Loans are underwritten and originated for local borrowers by participating locally active Community Development Financial Institutions (CDFIs), including Community Housing Capital, Enterprise Community Loan Fund, Housing Partnership Fund, LISC and Raza Development Fund.

== Governance and organizational structure ==
=== Sponsors ===
The Stabilization Trust is sponsored by six non-profit organizations with national reputations for innovation in community-based housing and economic development. Enterprise Community Partners, Inc., Housing Partnership Network, Local Initiatives Support Corporation (LISC), UnidosUS (formerly National Council of La Raza), National Urban League, and NeighborWorks America. All of the organizations have been directly involved in activities to address foreclosure prevention, loss mitigation and issues facing communities across the country that are resulting from the foreclosure crisis.

=== Board of Managers ===
The Stabilization Trust has a Board of Managers composed of the executive leaders of the six sponsoring organizations. The executive leaders are:

- Eric Chatman, Housing Partnership Network
- Lautaro “Lot” Diaz, UnidosUS
- Andrew Jakabovics, Enterprise Community Partners
- Janneke Ratcliffe, Urban Institute
- John O’Callaghan, Atlanta Neighborhood Development Partnership
- Paul Singh, NeighborWorks America
- Bob Cooney, Local Initiatives Support Corporation

=== President ===
Robert Grossinger, President of the National Community Stabilization Trust, has held leadership roles in the community development and financial and legal services arena for more than 30 years. He joined NCST in May 2015 as President, where he also served on the Steering Committee since 2010.

Prior to joining NCST, Rob served as Vice President at Enterprise Community Partners, Inc. working nationally with a broad set of partners to provide thought leadership and technical assistance in the areas of community stabilization and the intersection of health care and housing. In addition, he served as a subject matter expert for their public policy work, helping to set and implement policy agendas.

Rob has also worked at Bank of America as Senior Vice President in the corporate social responsibility group overseeing the bank’s neighborhood stabilization efforts, including its Real Estate Owned (REO) sales to NSP recipients, and several other roles during his nine-year tenure at Bank of America and LaSalle Bank in Chicago, including serving as Regional Community Impact Manager for Illinois and Michigan and Manager of LaSalle Bank’s Community Development Corporation. He previously served as Vice President at the Corporation for Supportive Housing. Prior to that, Rob worked as Assistant Director and Assistant General Counsel at the Illinois Housing Development Authority and began his career as a legal aid attorney representing low income households in Illinois.

Rob is a graduate of University of Iowa College of Law and Indiana University.

=== Structure ===
The Trust has offices in Washington, DC, Irving, Texas, and Minneapolis, Minnesota, along with regionally based employees in the southeast, midwest, and northeast/mid-Atlantic.

== See also ==
- Enterprise Community Partners
- Gary Herbert
- Local Initiatives Support Corporation
- National Council of La Raza
- National Urban League
- NeighborWorks America
