= Fanny =

Fanny may refer to:

== Given name ==
- Fanny (name), a feminine given name or a nickname, often for Frances

== In slang ==
- A term for the vulva, in Britain and many other parts of the English-speaking world
- A term for the buttocks, in the United States

== Plays and films ==
- Fanny (play), a 1931 play by Marcel Pagnol
  - Fanny (1932 film), a French adaptation
  - Fanny (1933 film), an Italian production
  - Fanny (musical), a 1954 Broadway musical based on the Pagnol plays Marius, Fanny and César
  - Fanny (1961 film), an American non-musical film based on the 1954 musical
  - Fanny (2013 film), a French adaptation by Daniel Auteuil
- Fanny: The Right to Rock, a 2021 Canadian documentary film directed by Bobbi Jo Hart profiling Fanny (band)

== Music ==
- Fanny (band), an American all-female band active in the early 1970s

- Fanny (album), 1970 self-titled debut album by the band

- Fanny (singer) (1979–2025), French singer
- Fanny J (born 1987), French singer from Guiana
- "Fanny (Be Tender with My Love)", a 1975 song by the Bee Gees from Main Course
- "Fanny", a song by Argentine singer Leo Dan
- "Fanny", a song by Spratleys Japs from Pony

== Places ==
- Fanny Township, Polk County, Minnesota
- Fanny, West Virginia, an unincorporated community
- 821 Fanny, an asteroid

== Other uses ==
- List of ships named Fanny
- Fanny Award, a fan voted award for the adult entertainment industry
- Fanny's, a restaurant in Evanston, Illinois
- "Fanny", a poem by Edgar Allan Poe
- Fanny, a character from the fourth season of Battle for Dream Island, an animated web series

== See also ==
- Fanny Hill (disambiguation)
- Fanny pack, a pouch bag worn with straps that secure around the waist
- Fanny von Stratzing, the German name for the Venus of Galgenberg, a prehistoric statuette
- Fannie, a given name (including a list of people with the name)
- Fanni (disambiguation)
- FANY
