= Gérard Fauré =

French essayist

Gérard Fauré (born 1946) is a French essayist and presenting himself as a former drug dealer and bank robber. He is the author of several controversial books which claim to reveal the hidden side of a number of public figures in France and Europe.

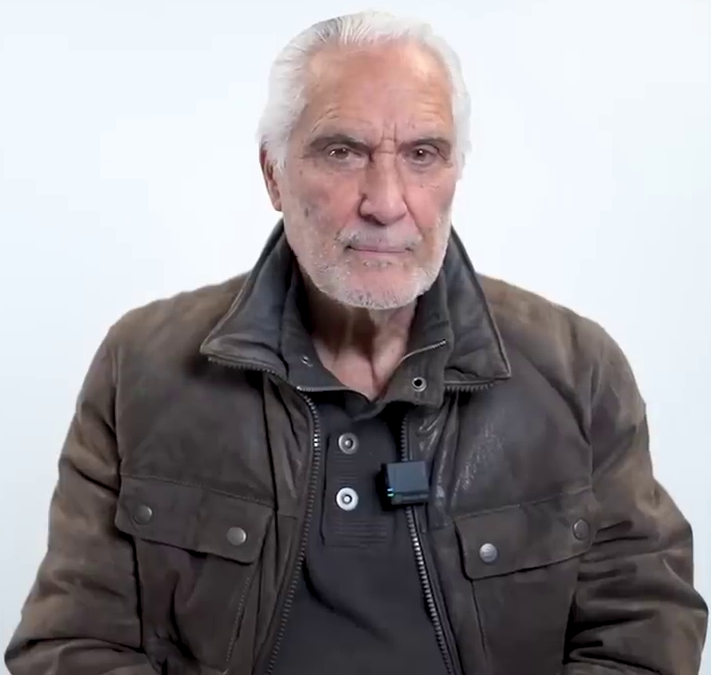
Gérard Fauré in an interview in 2023

== Biography ==
Gérard Fauré was born in 1946 in Fez, Morocco, to a Berber mother, and a father working as a physician in the French army. Born in the French Protectorate in Morocco (1907–1956), Fauré holds the French citizenship.

In 1999, Fauré was detained for the possession of 188 grams of cocaine.

Since 2016, he has been publishing books that unveil the alleged secrets and the hidden side of political figures and the show business with whom he claims to have been involved as a drug dealer. Charges may include unrestrained use of narcotics—mainly massive doses of cocaine—, sexual abuse, rapes, including pedophilia, child molestation, trafficking of children, murders and assassinations. (Note: See also interviews of Fauré.)

== Works ==
- Gérard Fauré, Laurent Still (January 2016). Fatale confiance: La vérité sur la mort de Mohammed V [Fatal Trust: The Truth about the Death of Mohammed V] (in French). Kindle Edition. ASIN B01AV16ZHY.
- Gérard Fauré, en collaboration avec Ange Peltereau (2018). Dealer du Tout-Paris: Le fournisseur des stars parle [Drug dealer for the All-Paris: The supplier to the stars speaks] (en appendice: choix d’articles de journaux) (in French). Vol. 1. Paris: Nouveau Monde Éditions. ISBN 978-2369427285. OCLC 1078356460. BnF 45610782h
- Gérard Fauré (2020). Le Prince de la coke: Dealer du Tout-Paris... la suite [The prince of coke: drug delivery man for the All Parisian... the continuation] (in French). Vol. 2. Paris: Nouveau monde. ISBN 978-2380940381.
