= USS Alfred A. Cunningham =

Allen M. Sumner-class destroyer

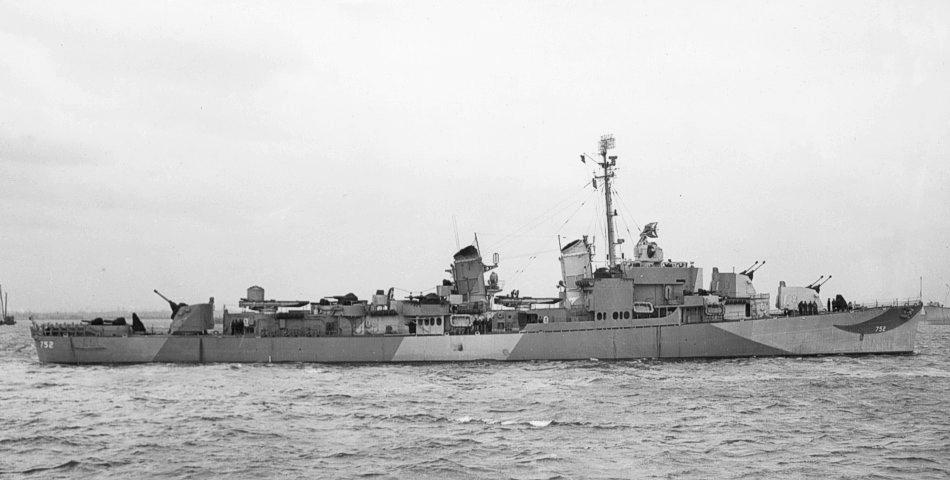

History

United States
- Namesake: Alfred Austell Cunningham
- Builder: Bethlehem Mariners Harbor, Staten Island, New York
- Laid down: 23 February 1944
- Launched: 3 August 1944
- Commissioned: 23 November 1944
- Decommissioned: August 1949
- Recommissioned: 5 October 1950
- Decommissioned: 24 February 1971
- Stricken: 1 February 1974
- Fate: Sunk as target 12 October 1979

General characteristics
- Class & type: Allen M. Sumner class destroyer
- Displacement: 2,200 tons
- Length: 376 ft 6 in (114.8 m)
- Beam: 40 ft (12.2 m)
- Draft: 15 ft 8 in (4.8 m)
- Propulsion: 60,000 shp (45 MW); 2 propellers
- Speed: 34 knots (63 km/h)
- Range: 6500 nm @ 15 kn; (12,000 km @ 28 km/h)
- Complement: 336
- Armament: 6 × 5 in (130 mm)/38 guns, 12 × 40 mm AA guns, 11 × 20 mm AA guns, 10 × 21-inch (533 mm) torpedo tubes, 6 × depth charge projectors, 2 × depth charge tracks

USS Alfred A. Cunningham (DD-752), an Allen M. Sumner-class destroyer, is the only ship of the United States Navy to be named for Alfred Austell Cunningham, a USMC officer and aviator.

== Construction and commissioning ==
USS Alfred A. Cunningham was laid down on 23 February 1944 at Staten Island, New York, by the Bethlehem Steel Company. She was launched on 3 August 1944, sponsored by Mrs. Alfred A. Cunningham, the widow of Lieutenant Colonel Alfred A. Cunningham and commissioned on 23 November 1944.

== Service history ==
=== World War II ===
Following shakedown training out of Bermuda, Alfred A. Cunningham returned to New York on 17 January 1945 for post-shakedown availability. Proceeding to Norfolk soon thereafter, the destroyer spent the next three months operating in the Chesapeake Bay area as a training ship for prospective destroyer crews. Here the ship introduced hundreds of trainees to life on board a destroyer, engaging in gunnery exercises, damage control drills, and maneuvering practice.

Following a brief availability for repairs and alterations at the Norfolk Navy Yard, Cunningham got underway on 7 May, and rendezvoused with the new heavy cruiser USS Chicago (CA-136) off Brown Shoals, Delaware Bay, and proceeded with that ship to Chesapeake Bay for gunnery exercises. The two warships then steamed to Guantánamo Bay, then Panama, transiting the canal on 18 May, and arrived at Pearl Harbor on 31 May. Over the next two weeks, Cunningham remained in Hawaiian waters, undergoing an availability alongside the USS Black Hawk (AD-9) and carrying out training.

On 13 June, the destroyer joined Task Group (TG) 12.4 and sailed for the western Pacific. A week later, while en route, Cunningham screened carriers launching air strikes on Japanese-held Wake Island. The group arrived at Leyte on 26 June.

Cunningham got underway the following day for Okinawa, and while en route to her destination conducted a depth charge attack on what she evaluated as a "good" submarine contact, but with negative results. Shortly after arriving at Okinawa on 29 June, she served on radar picket duty off the island's southwest coast. From 1 July until the end of hostilities she served on patrol, escort, and screening duty in waters surrounding the Ryukyus. Following Japan's capitulation, Cunningham remained in the Far East, operating off the coast of China between the Yellow Sea and the South China Sea. She performed escort services and served on an antismuggling patrol between Korea and Japan. The destroyer returned to the United States on 28 March 1946, went into reserve at San Diego on 12 May 1947, and was decommissioned in August 1949.

=== Korea ===
During the buildup of the fleet in the wake of the North Korean invasion of South Korea in late June 1950, Alfred A. Cunningham was recommissioned on 5 October 1950 and joined the Pacific Fleet. Following training exercises, the destroyer got underway for the western Pacific (WestPac) on 2 January 1951. Cunningham was involved in a variety of operations, principally serving with Task Force (TF) 77, the fast carrier task force, off the coast of Korea.

Early in this deployment, on 18 February 1951, the ship was released from her "Bird Dog" station (plane guard) with TF 77 to carry out a night shore bombardment mission on "targets of opportunity" near Tanchon, on the east coast of Korea. Cunningham arrived on station at 2130 and opened fire, conducting harassing and interdictory fire; her targets included railroad tracks, two grade crossings, a tunnel, and lights on the road leading south. After expending 90 rounds of 5-inch, the destroyer ceased fire at 0605 on the 19th.

Returning to San Diego on 4 September 1951, Cunningham again sailed for the Far East in March 1952. As before, she steamed with the fast carrier task force off Korea and performed shore bombardment missions. On 19 September, the destroyer was operating in Task Element 95.22 (the "Songjin Element") to prevent the movement of trains along the railroad at that point by preventing clearance of the roadbed and repair during the day, and destroying trains at night. Patrolling some 6,000 yards off the beach at about 1340, Cunningham fired on enemy workers she had seen in the vicinity. A little over an hour later, detecting the workers at a tunnel, the destroyer stood in toward the shoreline, turning slowly to starboard to take a northeasterly course to fire on the enemy at the tunnel mouth.

At that point, at least three enemy guns opened fire on the ship. The first salvo was a direct hit, on the main deck, starboard side; several pieces of shrapnel penetrated the shield of mount 51 and wounded three of the mount's crew. Two air bursts followed in quick succession, one on either side of the bridge. Within two minutes time, the North Korean guns had registered four more direct hits and at least seven air bursts near the ship.

One shell penetrated into the forward fire room, destroying a forced-draft blower; shrapnel holed a nearby bulkhead. Another shell struck a depth charge on the forward K-gun, blowing the charge apart and scattering burning TNT as far aft as the fantail; shrapnel from this hit set another depth charge afire, and ruptured four others. The fourth hit on the starboard side, two feet below the main deck; shrapnel from this hit caused extensive damage to the motor whaleboat. The last shell to hit struck about two feet below the waterline, but did not penetrate. The air bursts near the bridge rendered the SG radar inoperative.

Immediately, one of the ship's 3-inch mounts opened up to return the shore battery's fire, expending both hoppers full (ten rounds); these rounds landed in the target area but did not slow the enemy's rate of fire.

With Cunningham under fire, Lieutenant Frederick F. Palmer, USNR, the officer of the deck, sounded the general alarm, ordered the rudder shifted to left full, rang up the port engine back emergency full, starboard engine ahead flank, in order to come left and open the range.

Although mount 53 had reported a fire on the starboard K-guns, the blast from the guns of that mount and the nearby 3-inch mount, 34, prevented a repair party from approaching the blaze from that angle. Men from another damage control party got to the fire and battled the blaze, while as the ship sped to seaward, weaving but keeping at least one main battery mount bearing on the target guns at all times.

As the ship opened the range to 9,000 yards and worked up to 26.5 knots, Ensign Charles E. Dennis, USNR; Chief Torpedoman William J. Bohrman; and Electrician's Mate 2nd Class Victor J. Leonard manhandled one burning depth charge over the side, performing this task at great personal risk while the fire on the K-guns was being brought under control. All three men were later recommended for the award of the Bronze Star.

Having suffered 13 men wounded, principally to shrapnel, Cunningham pulled out of range and stood down from general quarters, steering toward Yang Do Island to receive medical assistance from Charity. After emergency repairs, Cunningham was able to continue her combat operations. Cunningham ultimately returned to the United States and reached her new home port, Long Beach, California, on 6 November.

Cunningham operated in the southern California area through the first five months of 1953 before getting underway on 13 June for another WestPac deployment. During her five months in the Far East, Cunningham operated twice with TF 77. The first of these periods saw her escorting the heavy cruiser Bremerton. On 29 and 30 July 1953, Cunningham participated, with Bremerton and other United States Navy ships, in the search and rescue effort to recover the crew of a Boeing RB-50 that had crashed in the Sea of Japan. The searching ships managed to recover only the co-pilot.

The destroyer also participated in intensive antisubmarine warfare (ASW) exercises with TG 96.7 and joined in operations near Taiwan with other ships of Destroyer Division (DesDiv) 131. She returned to Long Beach on 20 December 1953.

A regular overhaul kept her at the Mare Island Naval Shipyard from February through April 1954. Then, after two months of training, Cunningham got underway for WestPac on 10 August. En route, she stopped at Pearl Harbor for gunnery and antisubmarine exercises and then continued on to Yokosuka, Japan. Cunningham joined TG 70.2 for maneuvers and division exercises and made two brief port visits to Manila. Next she operated with TF 72 as a part of a patrol in the Taiwan Strait. Cunningham then escorted Yorktown to Hong Kong and on to Manila, where she spent the holiday season.

Cunningham continued her work as plane guard for Yorktown into 1955, and returned to Long Beach on 6 February. After a leave and upkeep period, she resumed operations off the California coast. On 11 May, the destroyer took part in Operation "WigWam."

Following five months of preparation, Cunningham departed the west coast on 11 October, bound for Japan. She made fuel stops at Pearl Harbor and Midway en route to Yokosuka. Upon completion of voyage repairs, the destroyer joined TF 77 for three weeks of duty, broken once by a port call at Kobe, Japan. Cunningham spent the Christmas holidays at Yokosuka.

=== 1956–1965 ===
Antisubmarine exercises were her first assignment of 1956 before she proceeded, via Subic Bay, to join the Taiwan Strait patrol for a fortnight. Then the destroyer visited Hong Kong and stopped briefly in Yokosuka for repairs before sailing for home. After arriving at Long Beach on 31 March, she entered the San Francisco Naval Shipyard in May for an overhaul which was followed by two months of underway training out of San Diego. On 6 November, Alfred A. Cunningham got underway to escort Bremerton to Melbourne, Australia, where the ships participated in festivities surrounding the XVI Olympic Games. After 10 days in that port, the destroyer sailed for Yokosuka.

In January 1957, Cunningham took part in exercises near Chinhae, Korea, with ships of the Republic of Korea Navy (ROK). She then joined TF 77 in the South China Sea for plane-guard duty. This work was followed by another stint with the Taiwan Strait patrol. Cunningham made stops at Subic Bay, Hong Kong, and Yokosuka before sailing for the United States.

She arrived at Long Beach on 12 May and devoted the next few months to air defense, hunter/killer operations, and shore bombardment exercises along the California coast. In December, the destroyer entered the Long Beach Naval Shipyard for an availability.

On 13 January 1958, Cunningham sailed for another Far East tour. Following stops at Pearl Harbor; Pago Pago, American Samoa; and Wellington, New Zealand, the destroyer arrived at Hobart, Tasmania, on 7 February. There, the members of her crew were graciously entertained by officials of the Royal Hobart Regatta.

On 12 February, Cunningham got underway for Guam, where she received two weeks of repair work. The destroyer then shifted to Yokosuka, arriving on 1 April. During the following months, the ship took part in numerous exercises, escorting and screening Ticonderoga and other warships. During the cruise, she visited Hong Kong; Subic Bay; and Buckner Bay, Okinawa, before arriving back at Long Beach on 21 July. In early September, she entered the Long Beach Naval Shipyard for overhaul. She left drydock in early December and spent the holidays in leave and upkeep.

The destroyer held refresher training during the first three months of 1959, departed Long Beach on 28 March, and steamed to Yokosuka. On 15 April, she left that port in company with Shangri-La to take part in Exercise "Sea Turtle", off the coast of Korea.

Late in May, Cunningham assisted in Exercise "Granite Creek." After a visit to Hong Kong, she returned to Yokosuka for an availability to prepare for the voyage home where she arrived on 27 August. The ship spent the rest of the year participating in gunnery exercises, ASW exercises, and acting as a school ship for Fleet Training Group, Pacific.

In January 1960, Cunningham, took part in STRIKEX 30–60. On 1 February, she became a unit of DesDiv 132 and was assigned to TG 14.7, a hunter/killer group. From 1 February to 7 May, the destroyer trained with that unit in the eastern Pacific.

Leaving Long Beach on 17 May with Destroyer Squadron 13 and Hornet, Cunningham proceeded to Pearl Harbor where she arrived on 23 May. The force remained in Hawaiian waters conducting ASW exercises until their departure on 5 July. The destroyer reached Kobe, Japan, on 16 July and began an upkeep period. She next sailed for ASW operations in the area off Okinawa, conducting these until 29 August, when the ship entered Subic Bay. Except for two brief visits to Hong Kong, she remained in the Subic Bay area until 3 December, when she sailed for Yokosuka. After a brief upkeep period, the ship left on a return voyage to the west coast, arriving at Long Beach on 18 December.

In late January 1961, the ship entered the Long Beach Naval Shipyard for a fleet rehabilitation and modernization (FRAM) overhaul. She held sea trials in July and August and resumed operations on 22 September. On 9 October, she sailed for Seattle. The ship conducted sound trials in Puget Sound from 12 to 20 October and then returned to Long Beach, whence she held refresher training in San Diego waters with the fleet training group from 30 October through 8 December.

Throughout the first five months of 1962, Cunningham alternated periods at sea with upkeep in her home port. On 7 June, she departed the west coast for a six-month WestPac cruise. Upon her arrival at Pearl Harbor on 13 June, the destroyer conducted ASW operations off Oahu before proceeding on to Yokosuka. In August, the destroyer took part in combined operations with the Japanese Maritime Self-Defense Force and made port calls at Kure, Kobe, and Sasebo, before returning to Yokosuka on 31 October. She got underway again on 3 November for patrol duty in the Strait of Tsushima and, after completing this task on 14 November, sailed via Hong Kong to Subic Bay. On 2 December, the ship participated in a weapons demonstration, then began her voyage back to the United States, arriving at Long Beach on 21 December.

The destroyer spent the first three months of 1963 in local operations, including its participation in the filming of the Warner Brothers family film The Incredible Mr. Limpet, starring Don Knotts and Carole Cook.

On 1 April, she became a part of DesDiv 232 and spent April and May in availability at San Diego. Putting to sea in early June, she began a series of intensive ASW training exercises. In August, Cunningham sailed north with Carrier Division 19 on a goodwill and training cruise to Seattle, and the Alaskan ports of Skagway and Dutch Harbor. After a month back at Long Beach, the destroyer got underway for Pearl Harbor and several weeks of ASW operations. She returned to Long Beach in December for leave and upkeep.

On 20 February 1964, the ship left Long Beach in company with the other ships of DesDiv 232 for a six-month WestPac tour. Reaching Pearl Harbor on 28 February, Cunningham operated locally until sailing for the Far East on 23 March. Soon after leaving Hawaii, the destroyer took part in Operation "Crazy Horse", off the coast of Okinawa. On 7 April, the ship began a week of upkeep in Yokosuka. Other ports of call during this deployment included Kure, Sasebo, and Hong Kong. From 9 June to 4 July, the ship operated out of Kaohsiung, Taiwan, on the Taiwan Strait patrol. Alfred A. Cunningham. then steamed to the Sea of Japan for Operation "Crossed Tee", a joint operation with ships of the Japanese Maritime Self-Defense Force. Then, following stops at Hakodate and Yokosuka, Japan, the destroyer arrived back in Long Beach on 11 August for leave, upkeep, and local operations. On 15 November, she entered the Long Beach Naval Shipyard for an overhaul.

Upon completion of this renewal effort on 15 March 1965, the ship departed Long Beach for seven weeks of refresher training in San Diego waters. Early in June, she embarked 30 midshipmen for a two-week training cruise in the Puget Sound area. On 12 August, Cunningham got underway for her 13th WestPac cruise. The ship stopped at Pearl Harbor for a two-week ASW operation held southwest of Molokai. A fortnight's upkeep at the Pearl Harbor Naval Shipyard ensued before the destroyer continued on to Yokosuka.

=== Vietnam ===
In October, Alfred A. Cunningham joined TF 77 for patrol and surveillance duties off the coast of North Vietnam and in the Gulf of Tonkin. Following a week of recreation in Hong Kong, the destroyer got underway on 10 November to steam to Kaohsiung, and operated out of that port on patrol in the Taiwan Strait. On 5 December, she proceeded through the Tsushima Strait into the Sea of Japan for a joint ASW exercise with ships of the Republic of Korea (ROK) Navy before returning to Sasebo for the Christmas holidays.

In January 1966, Cunningham again patrolled off the Vietnamese coast and provided naval gunfire support in the area of Quang Ngai, South Vietnam. The final weeks of her patrol were spent on radar picket station south of Hainan Island. After a brief respite at Yokosuka, the ship sailed back to the United States, reaching Long Beach on 3 March.

For the next seven months, she held numerous training operations and availability periods but was underway west again on 4 November, bound for Oahu on the first leg of her deployment. Once in Hawaiian waters, the destroyer held exercises with combined American and Canadian forces and then continued on to Yokosuka for a brief upkeep period before sailing to the Taiwan Strait for patrol duty.

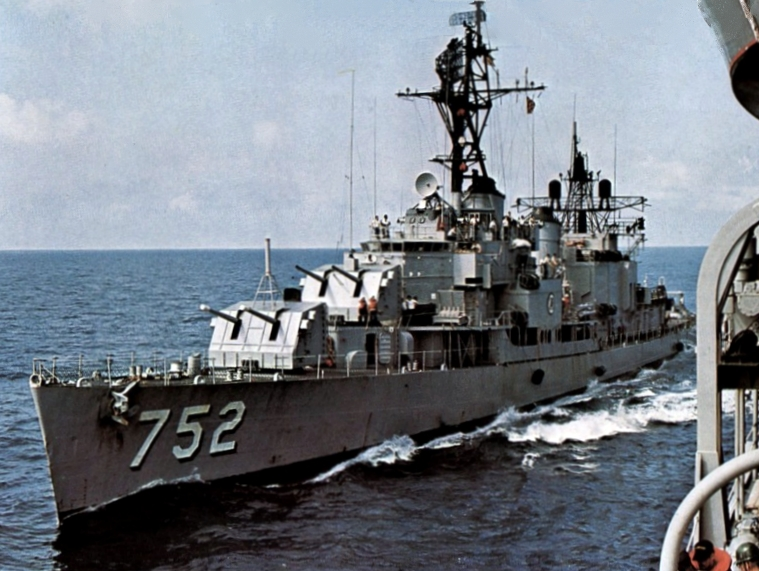
Alfred A. Cunningham underway, circa 1969.

Cunningham proceeded to the Gulf of Tonkin early in January 1967 to serve as a plane guard for Bennington to assist in recovering downed aviators. In February, the ship was assigned to Operation "Sea Dragon", a logistics interdiction effort in the coastal waters of North Vietnam, and continued this duty into April. Another stint of service in the Taiwan Strait followed, lasting from 6 to 12 April. On the 28th of that month, the destroyer sailed for home where she spent one and a half months preparing for an overhaul. She entered the Long Beach Naval Shipyard on 14 July and underwent extensive repairs and alterations. Upon completion of the yard work in November, Cunningham spent a month in independent steaming and undergoing tender availability.

The destroyer began 1968 with refresher training in San Diego and then was deployed once more to southeast Asian waters. She repeated her former pattern of plane guard and search and rescue operations off the Vietnamese coast. On 23 October, the ship set course for home, made fueling stops at Midway and Pearl Harbor, and arrived back in Long Beach on 9 November.

On 2 January 1969, Cunningham took part in Operation "Quickstart", and plane guarded for Oriskany. The destroyer maintained a full schedule of exercises and availability periods until 1 July, when a shaft bearing casualty caused her to enter the Todd Shipyard at San Pedro, California, for repairs.

Emerging from drydock on 6 September, Cunningham began an intensive one-month period of preparations for deployment. The destroyer left Long Beach in early October and sailed to Pearl Harbor for refueling; she then conducted port calls at Yokosuka, Buckner Bay, and Subic Bay. On 14 November, the destroyer stood out of Subic Bay for duty off Vietnam. From 19 November until 4 December, she supported forces ashore with fire from her 5-inch guns. On 5 December, she joined Hancock on "Yankee Station" and remained there until the 20th when she headed for Sasebo for the holidays.

Cunningham began the year of 1970 with ASW and flight operations in Okinawan waters which were followed by a five-day visit to Hong Kong. On 17 January, she sailed to join Constellation on "Yankee Station" and remained on this assignment until 21 February when the ship paid a brief visit to Kaohsiung. The destroyer sailed on 21 March to return to Long Beach. Upon her arrival on 9 April, she began a leave and upkeep period and then resumed operations in the southern California area in May. She spent the early summer months in training exercises and a midshipman training cruise, sailing from Long Beach to San Francisco, Victoria (Canada), Pearl Harbor, and then back to Long Beach. On 7 August, slated for inactivation, Cunningham unloaded all her ammunition at Seal Beach, California (USA).

== Decommissioning and disposal ==
Decommissioned on 24 February 1971, Alfred A. Cunningham was placed in reserve. Her name was struck from the Naval Vessel Register on 1 February 1974. Utilized as a target for weapons tests off the coast of Southern California, she was sunk after being hit with five laser-guided bombs on 12 October 1979.

== Honors and awards ==
- Asiatic-Pacific Campaign Medal with one battle star
- World War II Victory Medal
- Korean Service Medal with six battle stars
- Vietnam Service Medal with seven battle stars

Cunningham earned one battle star for World War II service, six for the Korea War, and seven for the Vietnam War.
