= Fannie Smith =

Fannie Smith may refer to:

- Fannie Douglass Smith (1865–1947), American journalist
- Fannie Smith Goble (1861–1940), American philanthropist and clubwoman
- Fannie Smith Washington (1858–1884), American educator; first wife of educator, author, and orator Booker T. Washington
