= Rebeca Baceiredo =

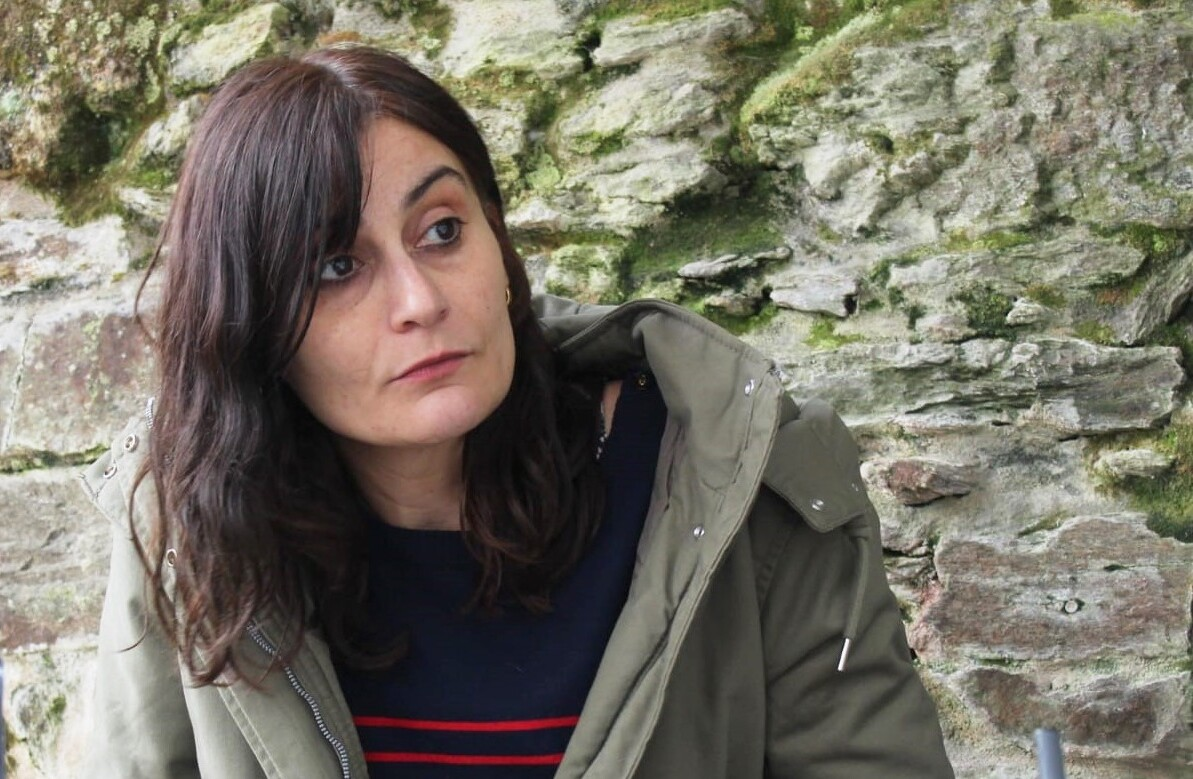
Rebeca Baceiredo (2022)

signature

Rebeca Baceiredo Pérez (Ourense, 19 December 1979) is a Spanish philosopher and essayist. In 2005, she won the Premio Ramón Piñeiro de Ensaio for her work O suxeito Posmoderno. Entre a estética e o consumo,, and in 2011, the Extraordinary Doctorate Prize for her doctoral thesis.

== Biography ==
Rebeca Baceiredo Pérez was born in Ourense in 1979. She graduated in Communication Sciences from the University of Santiago de Compostela. Later, she received her doctorate in 2011 with the thesis entitled Achegas onto-éticas para a liberation of suxeito. An approach based on the philosophy of Gilles Deleuze, on the figure of the French philosopher Gilles Deleuze, with which she won the Extraordinary Doctorate Award.

At the same time, she did a postgraduate degree in Theory and Practice of Interpretation and a master's degree in Contemporary Art, museology and criticism at the same university and in collaboration with the Centro Galego de Arte Contemporánea.

In 2007, she began her career as a teacher, which she combines with her role as a writer and essayist. Baceiredo is part of the school of philosophy of Gilles Deleuze. In her doctoral thesis, the understanding of the concepts that are part of the metaphysics proposed by the French philosopher allows her to try to approach the research of ontology and power. Baceiredo is interested in reversing the traditional relationship between identity and difference, in contrast to conventional philosophy that saw difference as derived from identity.

== Awards and honours ==
- 2006, Ramón Piñeiro Essay Prize, for O suxeito posmoderno. Entre a estética e o consumo
- 2007, finalist, Awards of the Association of Writers in the Galician Language, for O suxeito posmoderno. Entre an estética e o consumo
- 2011, Extraordinary Doctorate Prize, for Achegas onto-éticas para a liberation do suxeito. Unha acercamiento a partir de da filosofia de Gilles Deleuze.
- 2013, Best Essay Award, Association of Writers in the Galician Language, for A Revolución Non Vai Ser Televisada
- 2017, Finalist, Awards of the Association of Writers in the Galician Language, for Oiko-nomía do género. Relato das clausuras
- 2024, Finalist, Awards of the Association of Writers in the Galician Language, for Os corpos inscritos e os textos escritos. Género, moda e literatura.21

== Selected works ==
=== Essays ===
- 2006 – O suxeito posmoderno. Entre a estética e o consumo. Editorial Galaxia. ISBN 978-84-8288-932-0
- 2011 – (repeat to fade). Estaleiro Editora. ISBN 9788461502219
- 2013 – A revolución non vai ser televisada. Euseino? Editores. ISBN 978-84-616-4175-8
- 2014 – E meterei a miña Lei no seu peito. Estaleiro Editora. ISBN 978-84-616-9096-1
- 2015 – Capitalismo e fascismo. Psico-ontoloxía da escravitude. Euseino? Editores. ISBN 978-84-608-3263-8
- 2016 – Oiko-nomía do xénero. Relato das clausuras. Axóuxere. ISBN 978-8494476334
- 2018 – A verdade errada e a representación errante. Euseino? Editores. ISBN 978-84-945621-7-4
- 2019 – Animais de estimação e bestas de companhia. Através. ISBN 978-84-16545-26-1
- 2021 – Como não ser, tranquilamente, human@s. Técnica e política da Antiguidade à era neoliberal. Através. ISBN 978-84-16545-56-8
- 2022 – Clarice Lispector: intuicións ontolóxicas. Euseino? Editores. ISBN 978-84-121580-9-0
- 2023 – Os corpos inscritos e os textos escritos. Xénero, moda e literatura. Edicións Xerais. ISBN 978-84-1110-157-8
- 2024 - Mueve tus labios en la plegaria. Saber ligero en el siglo XXI . Editorial Tercero Incluido. ISBN 978-84-126833-4-9

=== Doctoral thesis ===
- 2011 – Achegas onto-éticas para a liberación do suxeito. Unha aproximación a partir da filosofía de Gilles Deleuze. Servizo de Publicacións e Intercambio Científico. ISBN 978-84-9887-635-2

=== Poetry ===
- 2016 – O canto da Sibila. Galaxia, Dombate. ISBN 978-84-9865-725-8
- 2019 – Libro de horas. Urutau. ISBN 978-85-7105-055-6
- 2022 – Who the fuck is Alice? Urutau. ISBN 978-65-5900-359-4

=== Stories ===
- 2020 – Éxodo. Ápeiron Ediciones. ISBN 978-84-122067-2-2
