= J. Edwin Brainard =

American politician (1857–1942)

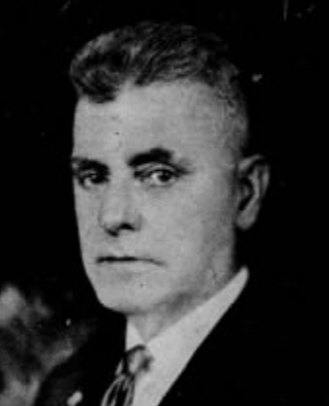

80th Lieutenant Governor of Connecticut
- In office 1925–1929
- Governor: John H. Trumbull
- Preceded by: John H. Trumbull
- Succeeded by: Ernest E. Rogers

Member of the Connecticut House of Representatives from Branford
- In office 1919–1925 Serving with Sidney V. Osborn (1919–1923); Ernest L. Averill (1923–1925)
- Preceded by: Sidney V. Osborn; Earle A. Barker
- Succeeded by: Albert B. Plant; Ernest L. Averill
- In office 1929–1931 Serving with Edwin R. Kelsey
- Preceded by: Albert B. Plant; Ernest L. Averill
- Succeeded by: Irwin W. Morton; Fannie P. Goldsmith

Personal details
- Born: John Edwin Brainard; August 27, 1857 Meriden, Connecticut, U.S.
- Died: September 8, 1942 (aged 85) Branford, Connecticut, U.S.
- Party: Republican
- Spouse: Lizzie C. Bartholomew Brainard
- Children: Norman, Spencer, and Edwin H. Brainard

John Edwin Brainard (August 27, 1857 – September 8, 1942) was an American politician who was the 80th Lieutenant Governor of Connecticut from 1925 to 1929. He previously served as President pro tempore of the Connecticut Senate.

== Biography ==
Brainard was born on August 27, 1857, in Meriden, Connecticut, the son of Dr. Edwin W. Brainard and Madilena S. Smith Brainard. When he was five, his family moved to nearby Branford, where he attended public schools and graduated from high school. He began studying medicine under his father, but his education was cut short when his father was struck and killed by a train while driving to attend a sick call. He married Lizzie C. Bartholomew, and they had three sons, Norman, Spencer, and Edwin H. Brainard.

== Career ==
In 1880, Brainard moved to Meriden and was employed by the Meriden Malleable Iron Company until 1891. He resigned to go into the bicycle business on Church street, Brainard and Wilcox, which continued until 1817, when he sold out to his partner and took a position with the firm of Ives, Uphani and Rand until 1898, and he was appointed street superintendent and later elected as a member from Branford to the Connecticut House of Representatives, serving from 1919 to 1925 and 1929 to 1931.

Brainard was elected as a Republican Lieutenant Governor of Connecticut and served from 1925 to 1929. He was a delegate to Republican National Convention from Connecticut, 1928.

== Death ==
Brainard died in Branford, Connecticut, on September 8, 1942, at age 85. He was buried at the Branford Center Cemetery.

Political offices
Preceded by John H. Trumbull	Lieutenant Governor of Connecticut; 1925–1929	Succeeded by Ernest E. Rogers
