= Fani Stipković =

Croatian television reporter, host and journalist

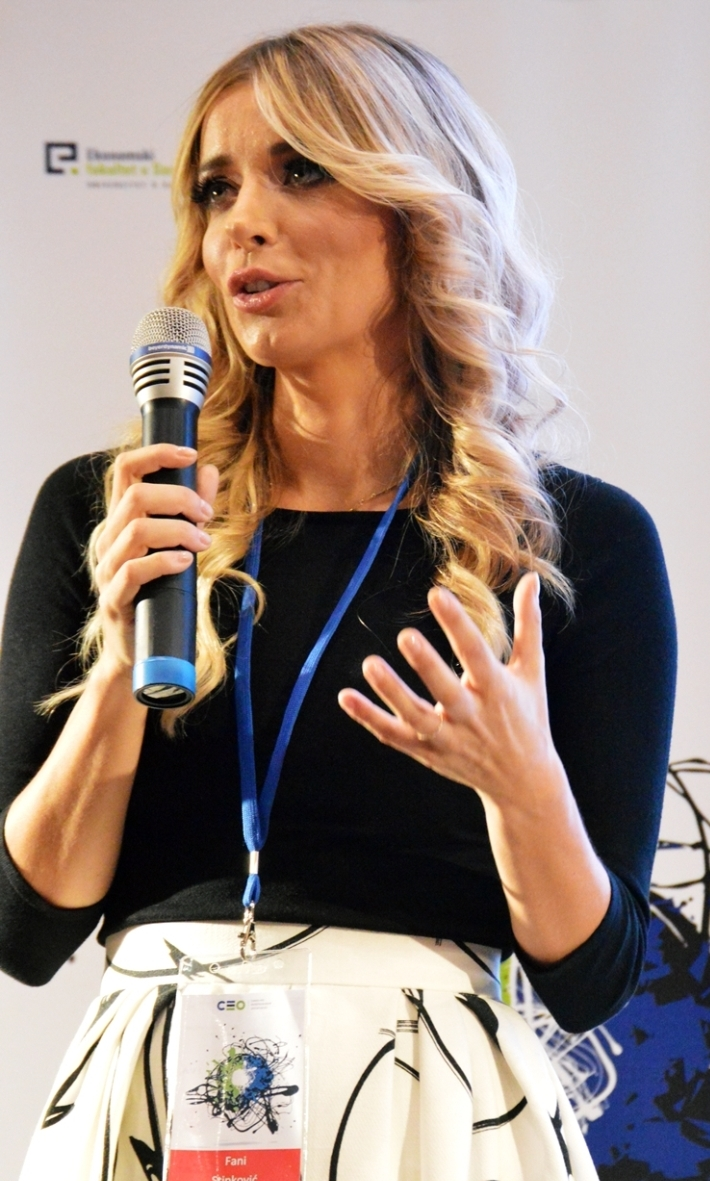
- Stipković speaking at the CEO Conference in Zagreb, Croatia, 2015
- Born: August 20, 1981 (age 44); Korčula, SR Croatia, SFR Yugoslavia (now Korčula, Croatia)
- Education: Master's degree, television production & management
- Occupations: TV host, reporter, producer and journalist
- Years active: 2008–present
- Organization: Fani TV
- Television: Nova TV, RTL Televizija, HRT, Mediaset, AMC
- Parent(s): Tina Stipković, Jerko Stipković
- Relatives: Hrvoje Stipković
- Website: fanitv.com

Fani Stipković (born August 20, 1981) is a Croatian television reporter, host and journalist.

== Early life ==
Stipković was born and raised in Korčula on the eponymous island in Croatia, and attended Maršala Tito elementary school until the age of 14. In 1996, she moved to Croatia's capital city, Zagreb, and attended XV Gymnasium MIOC ("Education Centre for Mathematics and Computer Science"). In 2005, she graduated from the Faculty of Political Science, University of Zagreb with a bachelor's degree in Television and Press Journalism. In 2014, Stipković received her Master's in Television Production and Management from the Mediaset and European University of Madrid.

== Career ==
In 1996, Stipković joined the jazz dance group Tihana Škrinjarić and met Sandra Vranješ, who became her agent. She began modeling in Croatia, London, Milan, and Spain for various commercials, editorials, fashion shows, and music videos. During this time, she continued her political science studies at the University of Zagreb.

In 2001, Stipković was an intern at the Croatian Radiotelevision (HRT), Croatia's national television network, and was an editor for the Jutarnji List (literally "Morning Paper") and Vecernji List ("Evening Paper"), Croatia's main newspapers.

In 2005, Stipković worked at Nova TV, part of Central European Media Enterprises. She hosted the television show Red Carpet, conducting celebrity interviews with the football player Cristiano Ronaldo, basketball player Kobe Bryant, Formula One driver Lewis Hamilton and tennis players Rafael Nadal and Roger Federer. During this time she worked on Nova TV's In Magazine hosting Cool Tour, a summer show visiting luxury villas and resorts with various celebrities. Stipković also was involved in interviewing at numerous events, including, Miss Universe Croatia, Nad Lipom, US Open and ATP tennis tournaments, UEFA Champions League football games and Ballon d'Or, FIFA World Player awards.

In 2014, after graduating her Masters degree at Universidad Europea de Madrid, Stipković started for Mediaset sport at Mediaset Spain. Stipković worked at RTL Hrvatska as a TV correspondent reporting from Madrid, Spain. During this time, Stipković created her own channel, Fani TV, hosting exclusive interviews with various athletes, celebrities and entrepreneurs as well as showcasing travel and lifestyle hot spots around the world.

In 2015, Stipković worked with FACE TV, hosting exclusive interviews and events in Spain and Monaco, airing on regional television in former-Yugoslavian regions.

In 2013 and 2014, Stipković launched a swimwear collection in collaboration with Pletix, Pletix by Fani Stipković. In 2015, she partnered with Khongboon Swimwear launching the collections.

Stipković has authored articles for The Huffington Post including "What actually is success?" and "How to Drop Your Ego with Five Techniques".

In July 2016, Stipković was official TV host for Umag, doing interviews with Andre Agassi and many others athletes and celebrities. In August, she started collaborating with a Spanish production company, filming a TV story about Melania Trump and exclusive interview with Natascha Kampusch, which were broadcast on Mediaset Spain. In 2017, Stipković was guest in a special TV show on Antena 3 television in Spain about the presidency of Donald Trump. The same year Stipkovic worked as a correspondent from Spain for a sports channel from Croatia doing interviews with celebrities such as the Spain national basketball team coach Sergio Scariolo.

As a fitness and sports enthusiast, Stipković was hired to do a TV story about CrossFit. In May and June 2018, she worked as a daily live TV host for a Croatian football reality show. The ambassadors of the show were football stars such as captain of Croatian national team Luka Modrić and Barcelona's Ivan Rakitić, broadcast live on Croatian football television HNTV prior to the 2018 FIFA World Cup. In September and October 2018, Stipković was hosting Spanish TV programs working for AMC networks. These TV shows were broadcast in Spain and Latin America. Stipkovic continued doing exclusive interviews for Nova TV, interviewing tennis player Novak Đokovic and football player Luís Figo.

== Filmography ==
Year	Title	Role	Notes
2005	Luda kuca	Nurse	episode 1.2 – credited as Fani Stipković
2007	Zabranjena ljubav	Mia Marovic	episode 1.529 – credited as Fani Stipković
2007	Zabranjena ljubav	Mia Marovic	episode 1.530 – credited as Fani Stipković
2007	Zabranjena ljubav	Mia Marovic	episode 1.538 – credited as Fani Stipković
2007	Ne daj se, Nina!	Tea	episode 1.3 – credited as Fani Stipković
2011	Inside the NFL	herself	interview with sport director, Pete Radovich

== Awards ==
Stipković was ranked No. 1 as the Sexiest Journalist in Europe in 2014 and 2015.

In 2015, Stipković was a speaker at the C.E.O. Conference at the Faculty of Economics and Business, University of Zagreb.

Following her involvement with football, in April 2019, Stipković was selected as an executive committee of International Federation of Football History & Statistics, hosting the annual ceremony and giving awards to Luka Modrić and Thibaut Courtois.
