= Alfred A. Cunningham =

United States Marine Corps aviator (1882–1939)

Alfred Austell Cunningham
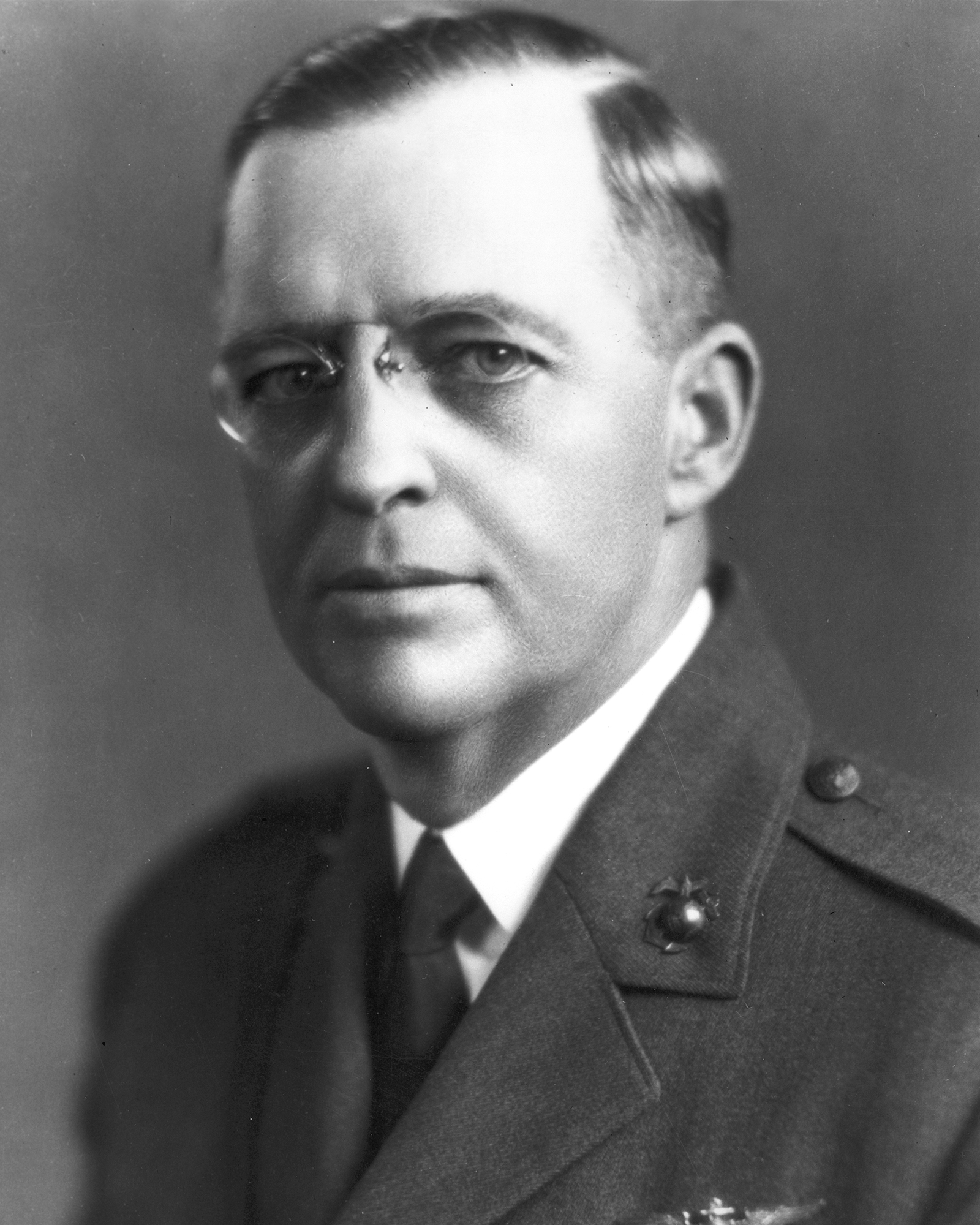
- 1st Marine Corps aviator 1st Director of Marine Corps Aviation
- Born: March 8, 1882; Atlanta, Georgia, U.S.
- Died: May 27, 1939 (aged 58); Sarasota, Florida, U.S.
- Burial place: Arlington National Cemetery
- Military career
- Allegiance: United States of America
- Branch: United States Marine Corps
- Service years: 1898, 1909–1935
- Rank: Lieutenant Colonel
- Commands: Marine Corps Aviation
- Conflicts: Spanish–American War: Cuban Campaign; World War I: Western Front; Banana Wars: Occupation of the Dom. Rep.; Occupation of Nicaragua
- Awards: Navy Cross

Alfred Austell Cunningham (March 8, 1882 – May 27, 1939) was an American aviator and a United States Marine Corps officer who became the first Marine Corps aviator and the first director of Marine Corps Aviation. His military career included service in the Spanish–American War, World War I, and U.S. operations in the Caribbean during the 1920s.

== Early life and career ==
Cunningham was born in Atlanta, Georgia. His interest in aviation began in 1903 when he watched a balloon ascend one afternoon. The next time the balloon went up he was in it and from then on he considered himself a "confirmed aeronautical enthusiast". He enlisted in the 3rd Georgia Volunteer Infantry regiment during the Spanish–American War and served a tour of occupation duty in Cuba. He spent the next decade selling real estate in Atlanta. During this time evinced an interest in aeronautics, making a balloon ascent in 1903.

At the age of twenty-seven, he returned to the military life, mostly because he thought that he would be given the opportunity to fly. He was commissioned as a 2nd lieutenant in the United States Marine Corps on 25 January 1909.

== Supporter of Marine Corps aviation ==
As a lieutenant, Alfred Cunningham retained an interest in aeronautics, he found at Philadelphia a likewise avid group of civilians and off-duty military men who harbored an interest in the same thing. He rented an airplane and gained permission from the commandant of the Navy Yard to use an open field at the Philadelphia Navy Yard for test flights. He also joined the Aero Club of Philadelphia, and commenced "selling" Marine Corps aviation to members of the Aero Club, who, through their Washington connections, began to pressure a number of officials, including Major General Commandant William P. Biddle, himself a member of a prominent Philadelphia family.

Cunningham was an avid supporter in the new conceptual Advanced Base Force and thought he saw a role for aircraft, requesting assignment to the Navy's flying school at Annapolis. Cunningham served in the Marine guards of New Jersey (BB-16) and North Dakota (BB-29), and the receiving ship USS Lancaster, over the next two years.

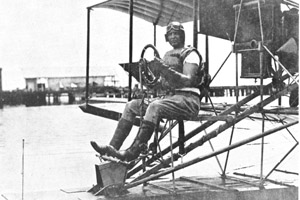
1stLt Alfred A. Cunningham, first Marine Corps aviator August 1912

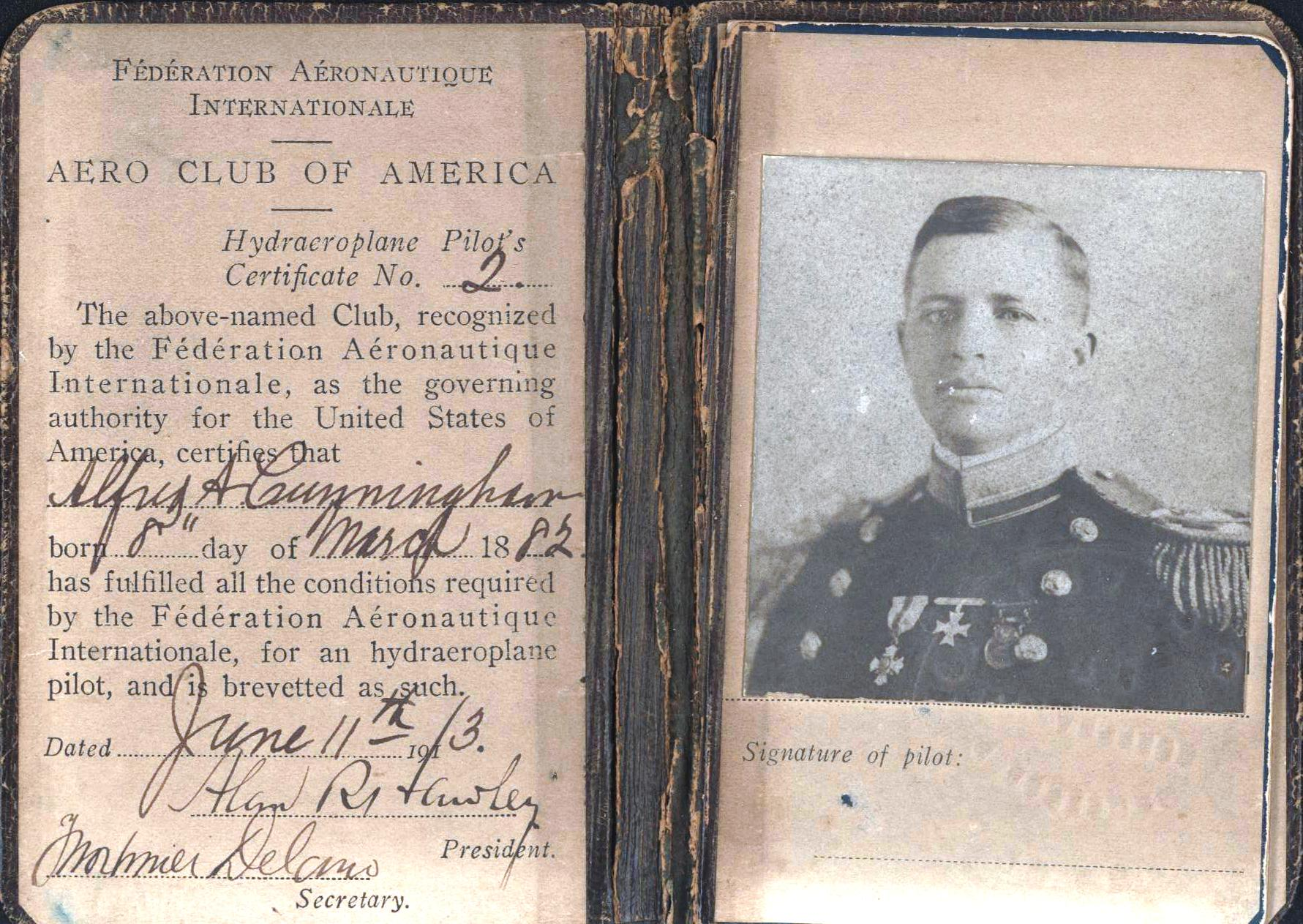
FAI Hydraeroplane Certificate# 2, 11 June 1913 for Alfred A. Cunningham

In 1911, while he was stationed at the Marine Barracks, Philadelphia Navy Yard, he developed the inspiration to fly. Leasing a plane from a civilian aviator only $25 a month, he experimented in the airplane, nicknamed the "Noisy Nan". He was promoted to the rank and grade of 1st lieutenant in September 1911. Although the plane never left the ground, his profound faith and love of flying was rewarded. On 16 May 1912, Cunningham received orders and stood detached from duty at the Navy Yard in Philadelphia, and was ordered to the aviation camp the Navy had set up at United States Naval Academy in Annapolis, to learn to fly. He reported six days later, on 22 May 1912, which is recognized as the birthday of Marine Corps aviation. Actual flight training was given at the Burgess Plant at Marblehead, Massachusetts, because only the builders of planes could fly in those days and after two hours and forty minutes of instruction, Cunningham soloed on 20 August 1912. He flew the Curtiss seaplane and became Naval Aviator No. 5, and Smith became Naval Aviator No. 6.

Between October 1912 and July 1913, Cunningham made some 400 flights in the Curtiss B-1, conducting training and testing tactics and aircraft capabilities. In August 1913, Cunningham sought detachment from aviation duty, on the grounds that his fiancée would not marry him unless he gave up flying. Although assigned duty as assistant quartermaster at the Marine barracks at the Washington Navy Yard, the first Marine aviator continued to advocate Marine Corps aviation and contribute significantly to its growth.

By November 1913, the Navy Department had assigned Cunningham (and Smith) to return to the Advanced Base School with the understanding that they would create an aviation section for the force. Cunningham performed important reconnaissance roles for the force, which was fully functionable by 1914. Later, he served on a board, headed by Captain Washington I. Chambers, USN, tasked with drawing up a comprehensive plan for the organization of a naval aeronautical service. It was upon the recommendation of that board that the Naval Aeronautical Station at Pensacola, Florida, was established in 1914.

The following February, Cunningham was assigned duty at the Washington Navy Yard, assisting Naval Constructor Holden C. Richardson in working on the D-2 flying boat. Ordered to Pensacola for instruction in April 1915 (his wife apparently having relented in allowing her husband to fly), Cunningham was designated Naval Aviator No. 5 on 17 September 1915.

== World War I service ==
After heading the motor erecting shop at Pensacola, he underwent instruction at the Army Signal Corps Aviation School at San Diego, whence he was assigned to the Commission on Navy Yards and Naval Stations. Cunningham received orders on 26 February 1917, to organize the Aviation Company for the Advanced Base Force, at the Philadelphia Navy Yard. Designated as the commander of this unit, Cunningham soon emerged as de facto director of Marine Corps aviation. He sought, and got, enthusiastic volunteers to become pilots, and soon embarked on a determined campaign to define a mission for land-based marine air. In addition, he served on a joint Army-Navy board that selected sites for naval air stations in seven naval districts and on the east and gulf coasts.

Detailed to Europe to obtain information on British and French aviation practices, he participated in a variety of missions over German lines. Returning to the United States in January 1918, he presented a plan to use Marine aircraft to operate against submarines off the Belgian coast and against submarine bases at Zeebrugge, Ostend, and Bruges.

The Northern Bombing Group emerged from these plans—four landplane squadrons equipped and trained in five months' time. On 12 July 1918, 72 planes, 176 officers and 1,030 enlisted men sailed for France on board the transport DeKalb, arriving at Brest on 30 July 1918. The Marines were sent to the fields at Oye, Le Fresne, and St. Pol, France; and at Hoondschoote, Ghietelles, Varsennaire and Knesselaere, Belgium. Despite shortages of planes, spare parts, and tools, the Marines participated in 43 raids with British and French units, as well as 14 independent raids, and shot down eight enemy aircraft. Planes of the group also dropped 52,000 pounds of bombs, and supplied 2,650 pounds of food in five food-dropping missions to encircled French troops. For his service in organizing and training the first Marine aviation force, Cunningham was awarded the Navy Cross.

=== Navy Cross citation ===
Citation:

The President of the United States of America takes pleasure in presenting the Navy Cross to Major Alfred Austell Cunningham (MCSN: 0-211), United States Marine Corps, for distinguished service in the line of his profession in connection with the organization and training of the First Marine Aviation Force in the United States, and as Commanding Officer of this Aviation force in France, where it served against the enemy and rendered valuable service as part of the Northern Bombing Group (USN).

== Post-war activities ==
After World War I, Cunningham returned to the United States to become officer-in-charge of Marine Corps aviation, a billet in which he remained until 26 December 1920, when he was detailed to command the First Air Squadron in Santo Domingo, Dominican Republic. Ordered thence to general duty at Marine Corps Schools, Quantico, Major Cunningham then served as assistant adjutant and inspector, and then division Marine officer and aide on the staff of commander, Battleship Division 3. On temporary detached duty in Nicaragua from June 1928, he served with the 2nd Brigade of Marines as executive officer of the Western Area at Leon, Nicaragua.

== Retirement and last years ==
Subsequently, becoming executive officer and registrar of the Marine Corps Institute from 1929 to 1931, Cunningham finished up his career as assistant quartermaster at the Marine Barracks, Philadelphia. His health failing, Cunningham retired on 1 August 1935. Promoted to lieutenant colonel while on the retired list, he died at Sarasota, Florida, on 27 May 1939. He is buried at Arlington National Cemetery.

== Honors ==
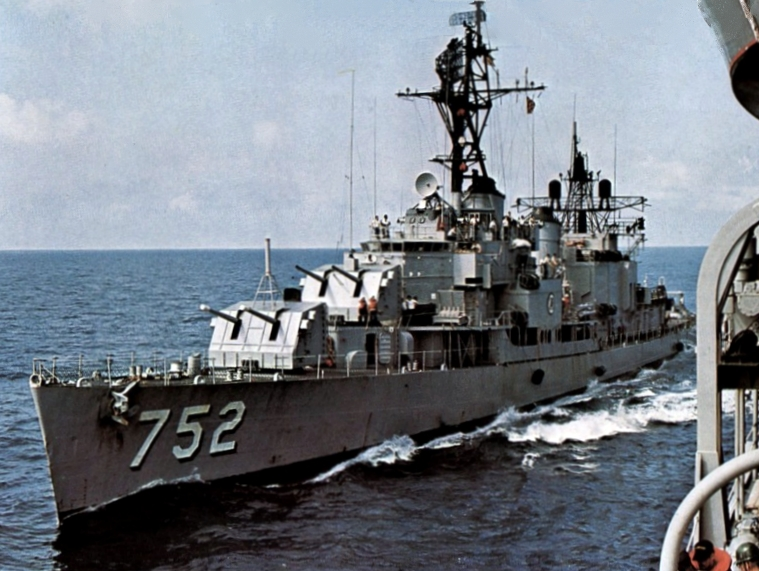
U.S.S. Alfred A. Cunningham (DD-752)

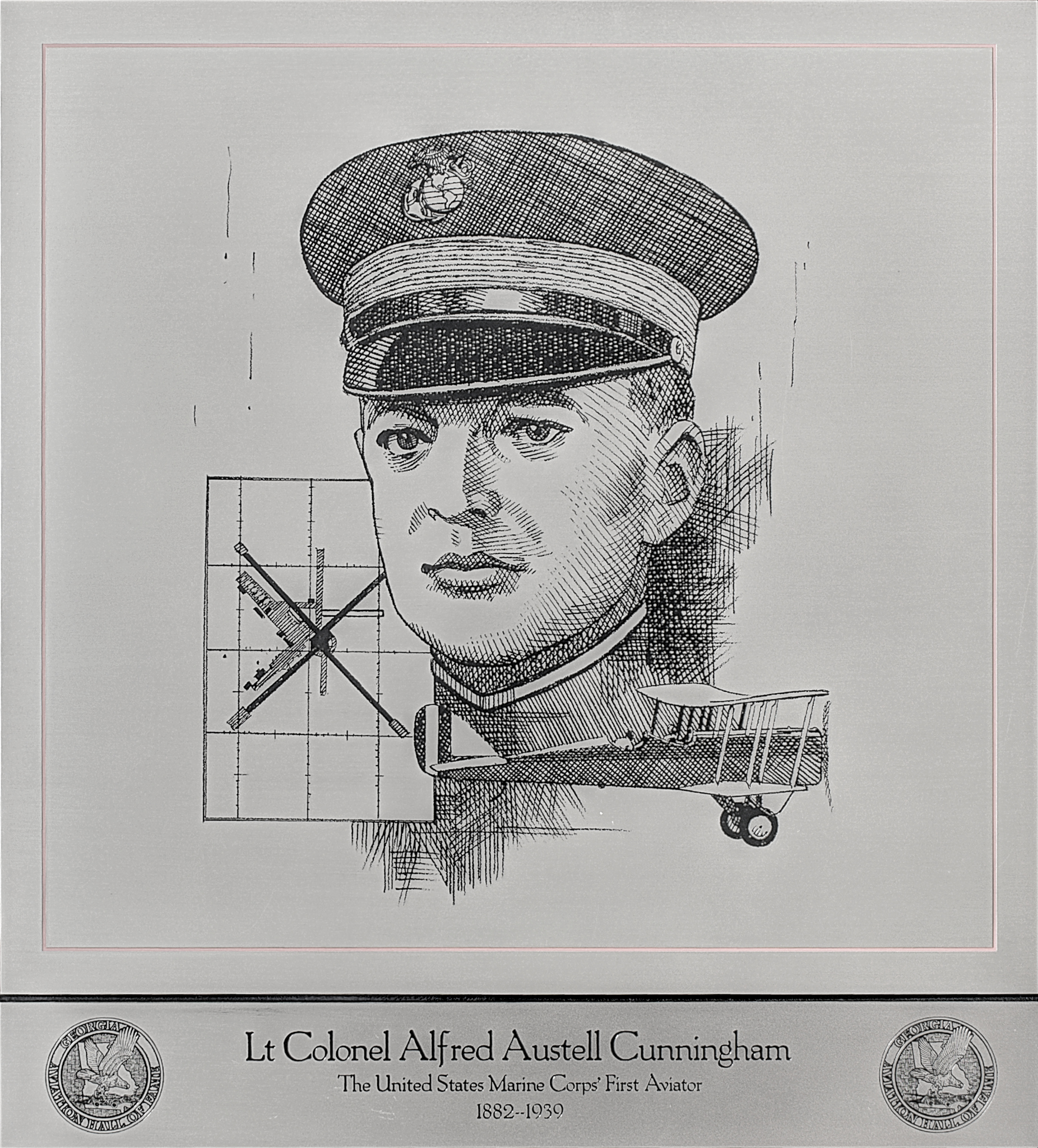
Plaque of Cunningham at the Georgia Aviation Hall of Fame

The destroyer USS Alfred A. Cunningham (DD-752) was named in his honor, it was commissioned in 1944, decommissioned in 1971, and deliberately sunk in 1979.

In 1965, Cunningham was enshrined in the National Aviation Hall of Fame. In 1991 he was inducted into the Georgia Aviation Hall of Fame.

The Alfred Cunningham Drawbridge, across the Neuse River at New Bern NC, is named in his honor.

== See also ==
- Early Birds of Aviation
- United States Marine Corps Aviation
- List of Historically Important U.S. Marines

== Notes ==
Military offices
Preceded by Billet established	Officer in Charge, Aviation; November 17, 1919 – December 12, 1920	Succeeded by Thomas C. Turner
