= Fanny's =

Restaurant in Illinois from 1946 to 1987

Coordinates: 42.0559°N 87.6944°W

Fanny's Restaurant was a notable eatery located at 1601 Simpson Street Evanston, IL US (the first suburb north of the Chicago City Limits) between 1946 and 1987. It was an anomaly in that it was located in a working-class neighborhood and yet known the world over. Patrons included the Marshall Field Family, of department store fame. Both the salad dressing and meat sauce won the International Epicurian Award of France. It was cited by Chicago Magazine as one of the top 40 Chicago restaurants ever. According to that same Chicago Magazine article Kraft Foods offered $75,000 in 1948 to buy Fanny's salad dressing recipe. This offer was refused. The restaurant was closed due to the deteriorating health of the founder, Fanny Lazar née Bianucci. According to the May 11, 1991 Chicago Sun Times and Chicago Tribune obituaries, Fanny Lazar died at Saint Francis Hospital of Evanston. At some point, possibly in the 1960s, Fanny's products became available on grocery shelves and the business continues on today through mail order. For several years the restaurant building at Simpson Street and Ashland Avenue was shuttered, then later occupied by rental tenants. During this period there was difficulty maintaining tenants because of what was described as ‘strange happenings’ and the claims that the building was haunted. However, during the condominium boom which occurred in the United States during the first ten years of the 21st Century it was heavily altered and converted into loft spaces. According to a July 5, 1998 Chicago Sun Times article a second version of the restaurant was opened in Union Pier, MI. It appears to remain in business as of 2011, as it can be found through searching local tourism web sites. Fanny's in Union Pier Michigan was located in the Gordon Beach Inn, It's no longer in business. Fanny's meat sauce and salad dressing can still be purchased through World Wide Food Products in Evanston, IL
