= Fannie Bayly King =

American suffrage activist (1864–1951)

- Born: Fannie Bayly; September 27, 1864; Staunton, Virginia, U.S.
- Died: January 13, 1951 (aged 86); Staunton, Virginia, U.S.
- Burial place: Thornrose cemetery, Staunton, Virginia, U.S.
- Education: Augusta Female Seminary (now Mary Baldwin University)
- Organization(s): Equal Suffrage League of Virginia, Virginia Library Association, Virginia Federation of Women's Clubs, Children's Code Commission
- Known for: Civil rights leader
- Movement: women's suffrage, Women's rights
- Spouse: William King
- Children: 1 son

Fannie Stratton Bayly King (September 27, 1864 – January 13, 1951) was an advocate for women's suffrage and social reforms in the early 20th century.

== Early and family life ==
Fannie Stratton Bayly was born in 1864 in Staunton, Virginia, the daughter of Captain Edmund Wilson Bayly and Edmonia Bell (1839–1909). She had two younger sisters, Maggie (1866–195) and Sallie (1868–1948).

She received her education at Augusta Female Seminary, which later became known as Mary Baldwin University. During her time at the seminary, she was influenced by the progressive ideas of its principal, Mary Julia Baldwin, who advocated for higher education opportunities for women. She may have become the postmistress of Markham in Fauquier County in 1897, succeeded by her sister Sallie.

In 1888, she married William Wayt. King (1864–1939), a fellow resident of Staunton, who served as the business manager for the seminary for most of his career, as well as treasurer of Augusta County for seven years. They had one son, Edmund, who predeceased them. In 1900, she and her husband and son, as well as her sister Maggie, husband and son, lived in and helped their father operate a boardinghouse in Staunton.

== Career ==
Throughout her life, King actively participated in various community improvement projects and organizations. During the early 1900s, she served as the president of the woman's auxiliary of the Young Men's Christian Association (YMCA). She also lent her support to the Instructive Visiting Nurse Association's public health work and served as the president of the local branch of the Co-Operative Education Association, which worked to enhance public education, at times transcending racial and social class boundaries.

In 1911, she was a co-founder of the Staunton Civic Club. Additionally, she held a vice president position in the Virginia Library Association in 1913. King was actively involved in women's clubs in Staunton and served as the president of the Virginia Federation of Women's Clubs from 1910 to 1912. However, her strong advocacy for women's suffrage caused a rift with the state federation when they declined to endorse suffrage during the state convention in 1912, leading to her resignation from the organization.

=== Women's suffrage ===
In early 1913, King assumed the presidency of the recently established Staunton chapter of the Equal Suffrage League of Virginia. Under her guidance, the league actively distributed suffrage literature, organized public debates on suffrage, and corresponded with legislators and congressmen. Fannie invited influential suffrage speakers to Staunton and also addressed local groups, including the Working Men's Fraternal Association.

The 1917 death of her son prompted King to withdraw from public activities for three years to grieve. However, after the ratification of the Nineteenth Amendment in 1920, which granted women the right to vote, King reemerged as an active civic worker. She was appointed to the committee responsible for organizing the Virginia League of Women Voters and attended its founding meeting in November 1920. King later proposed a resolution condemning the Ku Klux Klan, which was unanimously adopted during a conference of district directors in January 1921.

=== Child welfare ===
In the 1920s, King successfully persuaded Governor Elbert Lee Trinkle to establish an advisory Children's Code Commission, and she served one of its first members. The commission's recommendations to the Virginia General Assembly led to important legislative reforms aimed at improving conditions related to children's welfare, education, and labor in the Commonwealth of Virginia. King was actively engaged in child welfare issues and played a vital role in organizing the Staunton Community Welfare League, which later expanded to encompass Augusta County. She served as the executive secretary of the league from 1915 to 1932. The league focused on coordinating local public welfare efforts, with a special emphasis on providing foster homes for children. Additionally, she was a founder and vice president of the Augusta County Council which supported health clinics, home demonstration agents, and conducted research related to child labor. The organization was the first county welfare organization in Virginia and served as an early model for the state's public welfare system which followed in 1922.

== Later years and death ==
Following her husband's death in 1939, King donated their home, Kalorama (which she had inherited from her mother), to the city of Staunton for use as a public library, reserving for herself the right to live upstairs. King died on January 13, 1951, at her home in Staunton. She was buried alongside her husband and son in the city's historic Thornrose Cemetery.

== Legacy ==
The Fannie Bayly King Library on South Market Street in Staunton was dedicated in honor of King.

In 2020, King was named to the Virginia Women in History by the Library of Virginia.
