= Fannie Edgar Thomas =

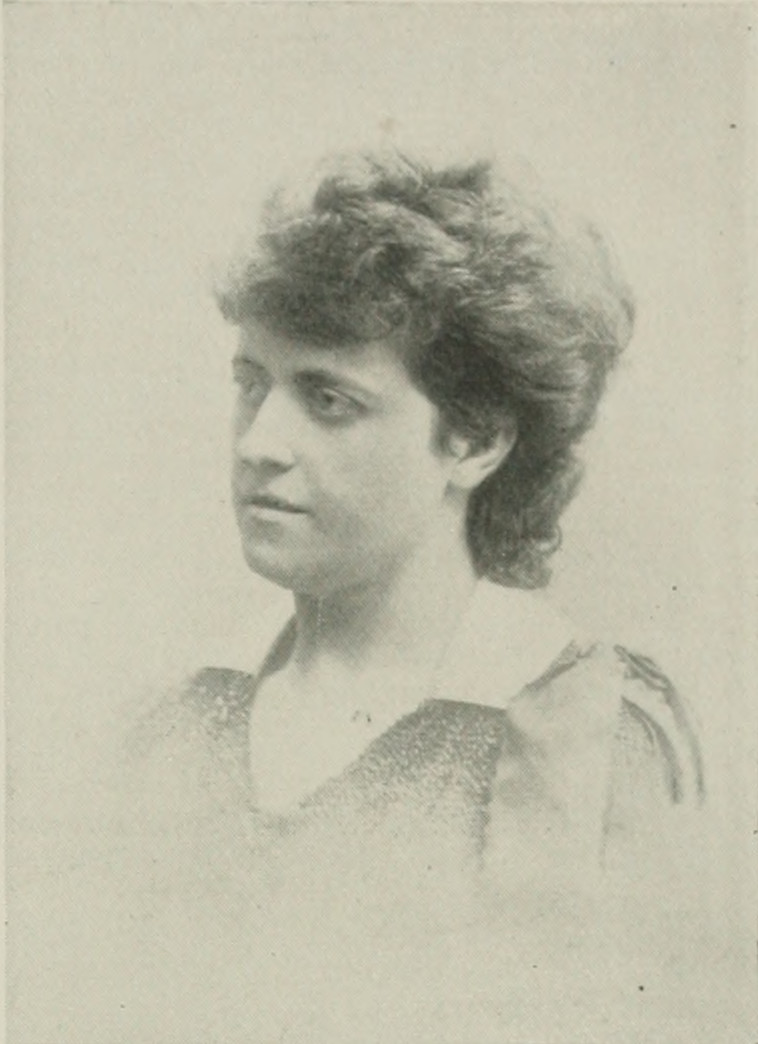
Fannie Edgar Thomas, A woman of the century

Fannie Edgar Thomas, born 1870 in Chicago, Illinois, dead 1925, was an American author.

== Career ==
The death of her father threw her upon her own resources while she was only a girl. She became a book-keeper in a publishing house, and worked hard and faithfully. As a diversion she wrote a small book during her leisure hours, which she published clandestinely by the aid of a printer. All the work was done outside of business hours. She signed the volume with the cabalistic pen-name, "6-5-20," and the venture was successful, clearing her a comfortable sum of money. The small edition was soon exhausted. The book attracted the attention of Ella Wheeler Wilcox, who invited the author to New York City and took her into her home. She soon became a contributor of taking sketches and essays, and the identity of "6-5-20" was established. Later she used her own full name.

She wrote for three New York magazines, the Sunday World, the Recorder and the Sun, but still economic independence was hard to achieve for a self-supporting woman.

== Legacy ==
Organ Loft Whisperings, The complete writings from Paris 1893-1894 by Fannie Edgar Thomas, at the time "Church Music Correspondent to New York's Musical Courier, were compiled and edited by Agnes Armstrong.
