= Fani Papageorgiou =

- Fani Papageorgiou. Reading, Zinc Bar. New York, Jan 2018.
- Born: 1975 (age 50–51); Athens, Greece
- Education: Harvard University; University of Edinburgh
- Spouse: George Stephanakis (married 2004-14)

Fani Papageorgiou (born 1975 in Athens, Greece) is a poet and critic.

== Background and education ==
Fani Papageorgiou is a graduate of Harvard University, the University of Edinburgh and Athens College.

== Books ==
- When You Said No, Did You Mean Never? poetry, (Shearsman Books, January 2013) ISBN 978-1-84861-265-5
- Not So Ill With You and Me poetry, (Shearsman Books, May 2015) ISBN 9781848614383
- The Purloined Letter, (Shearsman Books, coming in 2017) ISBN 9781848615649

== Translations ==
Cuando Dijiste No Querías Decir Nunca (Bartleby Editores, 2015)
