= Nik De Dominic =

American writer

Nik De Dominic (born January 1981) is an American poet and essayist.

He is the author of the poetry collection Goodbye Wolf and the chapbook Your Daily Horoscope. His work has appeared in DIAGRAM, Harpur Palate, Exquisite Corpse, The Los Angeles Review, Drunken Boat, Sonora Review, and elsewhere. He is a graduate of the University of Southern California and the University of Alabama.

He is a founding editor of The Offending Adam: A Journal of Poetics and the poetry editor of New Orleans Review.

De Dominic lives in Los Angeles, CA, co-founded and co-directs the Dornsife Prison Education Project at the University of Southern California. He directs USC's Writing Program.
