= Fannie Ostrander =

American journalist

- Born: 1859 North Haven, Connecticut, U.S.
- Died: November 10, 1921 (aged 61–62)
- Occupation: Novelist

Fannie Eliza Ostrander (1859 – 1921) was an American writer.

== Biography ==
Born in North Haven, Connecticut, Ostrander was a graduate of the Wisconsin State Normal School; she also had private instruction. She taught school for four and a half years, and became a critic, editor, and writer for a publishing house in Chicago in 1899. She wrote a series of magazine articles titled "New Lines of Thought", and wrote both prose and verse for a number of magazines. She wrote a number of novels and books for children as well. Later in life she lived in New Haven, Connecticut.

== Partial works list ==
Sources:

- When Hearts are True, 1897
- Beautiful Bible Stories, 1899
- Baby Goose, His Adventures, 1900
- Frolics of the A.B.C., 1901
- The Gift of the Magic Staff, 1902
- Animals At the Zoo, [1902]
- Little Pixies Abroad, 1905
- Goose Family Tales, 1905
- Little White Indians, 1907
- The Boy Who Won
