= Fanny Hill (disambiguation) =

Fanny Hill is a 1748 novel by John Cleland. Several adaptations have been made of the novel, including:

- Fanny Hill (1964 film), directed by Russ Meyer
- Fanny Hill (1968 film), directed by Mac Ahlberg
- Fanny Hill (1983 film), directed by Gerry O'Hara
- Fanny Hill (TV serial), 2007 TV serial directed by James Hawes and starring Rebecca Night

Fanny Hill may also refer to:

- Fanny Hill (album), the third album by US rock group Fanny
