= Simeon Simev =

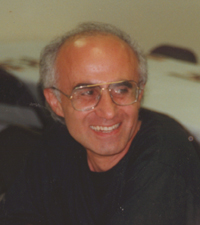
- Photograph taken in 1993 in United States
- Born: 30 May 1949 (age 76); Štip, today North Macedonia
- Occupation: Poet, essayist, journalist

Simeon or Simyon Simev (born 30 May 1949 in Štip) is a poet, essayist and journalist in North Macedonia.

== Biography ==
Simev studied history with history of arts at the Sts. Cyril and Methodius University in Skopje. He worked as a high school teacher, associate at the Ministry of Culture, journalist in the First Programme and editor in chief of Radio Culture (formerly known as Third Programme) in the Macedonian Radio.

Simev has published poetry, essays, studies in newspapers, magazines and periodical publications. His poetry has been published in Bulgaria and Germany.

== Works ==
- Соспи (Snow drift). Skopje: Tabernakul, 1997. 68 pp. ISBN 9989-647-21-6.
- Месечина огрева, сонце изгрева (The moon shines, the sun rises). Skopje: Nasha kniga, 1999. 66 pp. ISBN 9989-47-055-3.
- Дамга (Stain). Skopje: Nasha kniga, 2002. 86 pp. ISBN 9989-47-090-1.
- Шарената сенка: живопис, литература, музика (The motley shadow: Painting, Literature, Music). Skopje: Makavej, 2008. 159 pp. ISBN 978-9989-164-90-3.
- Ронливи лета море далечно (Crumbling years faraway sea). Skopje: Simev S., 2010. 76 pp. ISBN 978-9989-57-706-2.
