= Fannie Ellsworth Newberry =

American writer

Fannie Ellsworth Stone Newberry
- Born: May 7, 1848; Monroe, Michigan, U.S.
- Died: January 24, 1942 (aged 93); Coldwater, Michigan, U.S.

Fannie Ellsworth Stone Newberry (1848–1942) wrote a long series of books, many of them stories for girls, of which the best seller was The Wrestler of Philippi.

Newberry was born in Monroe, Michigan, on May 7, 1848, the daughter of Hiram and Sophia Stone. When Newberry was five, she moved to Chicago. She attended the Young Ladies Seminary of Monroe, Michigan. At age 17 she graduated from a school in Brookline, Massachusetts. In August, 1867 she married attorney Frank D. Newberry (June 23, 1840 – December 28, 1912) of Rochester, Michigan, who died in San Jose, California. They had four children: Max, Perry, Roy, and Grace. She died on January 24, 1942, aged 93, and is buried in Coldwater, Michigan.

== Works ==
- Impress of a Gentlewoman (1891)
- Sara, a Princess (1892)
- The Odd One: A Story for Girls (1893)
- The Wrestler of Philippi: A Tale of the Early Christians (1896)
- A Son's Victory; a Story of the Land of the Honey-bee (c1897)
- Strange Conditions (1898)
- All Aboard (1898)
- Joyce's Investments (1899)
- Not for Profit
- Bubbles
- Mellicent Raymond
- The House of Hollister
- Bryen's Home
- The Young Housekeeper
