= Fannie P. Goldsmith =

American politician (died 1931)

Member of the Connecticut House of Representatives from Branford
- In office January 1931 – April 6, 1931 Serving with Irwin W. Morton
- Preceded by: J. Edwin Brainard; Edwin R. Kelsey
- Succeeded by: Irwin W. Morton; Charles Reynolds

Personal details
- Born: 1869 or 1870 Branford, Connecticut, U.S.
- Died: April 6, 1931 (aged 62) Branford, Connecticut, U.S.
- Party: Republican
- Spouse: Charles B. Goldsmith

Fannie P. Goldsmith (died April 6, 1931) was an American politician who served in the Connecticut House of Representatives from January to April 1931, representing the town of Branford as a Republican. Goldsmith died of pneumonia at age 62, three months into her two-year term. Her death marked the first time a woman member of the Connecticut General Assembly had died while in office.
