= Fannie Williams =

Topics referred to by the same term

Fannie Williams may refer to:

- Fannie Barrier Williams (1855–1944), African American educator, and civil- and women's rights activist
- Fannie C. Williams (1882–1980), American educator
- Fannie Eleanor Williams (1884–1963), Australian scientist
