= Fannie Cobb Carter =

American educator (1872–1973)

Fannie Cobb Carter (September 30, 1872 – March 29, 1973) was an American educator, humanitarian, and activist for school integration in the United States.

== Early life ==
Fannie Cobb was born in Charleston, West Virginia. She was born the same the year a state constitution was passed to prohibit black and white children from attending the same schools. Daughter to two formerly enslaved people, Fannie began her schooling at a Black school in Charleston on Quarrier Street. Upon the death of her mother, Fannie lived with her grandmother who worked for Charles Lewis, who allowed Fannie to be taught alongside his children by their governess. Upon graduation from high school, she earned a teaching degree from Storer College in Harpers Ferry, West Virginia, in 1891.

In the late 1890s, Carter traveled with the Hampton Institute Singers from Hampton, Virginia. She traveled with them throughout Europe, although she was not a singer. She also attended the Hampton Institute for a time.

== Adult life ==
Fannie married Emery Rankin Carter in 1911, who was a lawyer in Charleston, West Virginia. They resided in the South Hills neighborhood.

Carter became friends with West Virginia Governor Homer Holt after she called upon him to stop a public hanging of a woman in Fairmont, West Virginia. Carter reportedly said, "Governor, a woman is going to be hanged. You know that a woman never has been hanged in West Virginia. You wouldn't want that to happen in your administration, would you?" This conversation led to the woman's sentence being commuted to life imprisonment.

== Career ==
After receiving her undergraduate degree, Carter initially taught in West Virginia, at Kanawha County public schools. There was "quite a commotion" caused by her hiring, as statements were made saying she lacked experience. To excel in her career, she spent her summers expanding her pedagogical knowledge through professional development at colleges such as Hampton, Oberlin, and Ohio State University.

Cobb was a founding member of the Charleston Woman's Improvement League in 1898. Thomas Miller, State Superintendent of Schools in West Virginia, released her from her contract to organize the teacher-trainer department at West Virginia Colored Institute in 1908, where she stayed for 12 years. The school is now known as West Virginia State University. Fannie was the highest paid Black educator in the state, making $700 a year.

In the 1920s, Carter was known as the first black woman to work in newspapers in West Virginia, and also was seen as a "leader in the fight against illiteracy." In 1925, Carter was named superintendent of the State Industrial Home for Colored Girls in Huntington, West Virginia. She received the position after the death of her husband, Emory Carter. She refused to take the position until the bars that lined the home's windows were removed by the state. She held that position for 10 years.

In 1935, Carter returned to Charleston and was named director of adult education for Kanawha County schools. She retired from this position two years later. She soon became the Dean at the National Trade and Professional School for Women and Girls in Washington, DC in 1945, and went on to serve as the school's acting president at age 89. She served there for a total of 17 years. In 1962, she returned to her home of Charleston, where she resided until her death. Additionally, she stayed active in the African-American community until shortly after her 100th birthday in 1973. Over her career, she was an outspoken proponent of school integration. She believed that integration should not come at the expense of African-American achievements not being recognized, and ethnic histories being wiped from the curriculum. Throughout her life, she received postgraduate education at Ohio State University, Oberlin College, the University of Chicago, and Columbia University.

== Honors ==
On June 11, 1977 the mayor of Charleston, John G. Hutchinson, named the day Fannie Cobb Carter Day. She is also honored with a bronze marker from the Association for the Study of Afro-American Life and History, through their National Historic Marker Project.
