= Fany Pérez Gutiérrez =

Mexican politician

- Born: 6 February 1967 (age 59); Tlaxcala, Mexico
- Occupation: Politician
- Political party: PAN

Fany Pérez Gutiérrez (born 6 February 1967) is a Mexican politician from the National Action Party. From 2010 to 2012 she served as Deputy of the LXI Legislature of the Mexican Congress representing Tlaxcala.
