= Fannie Douglass Smith =

American journalist

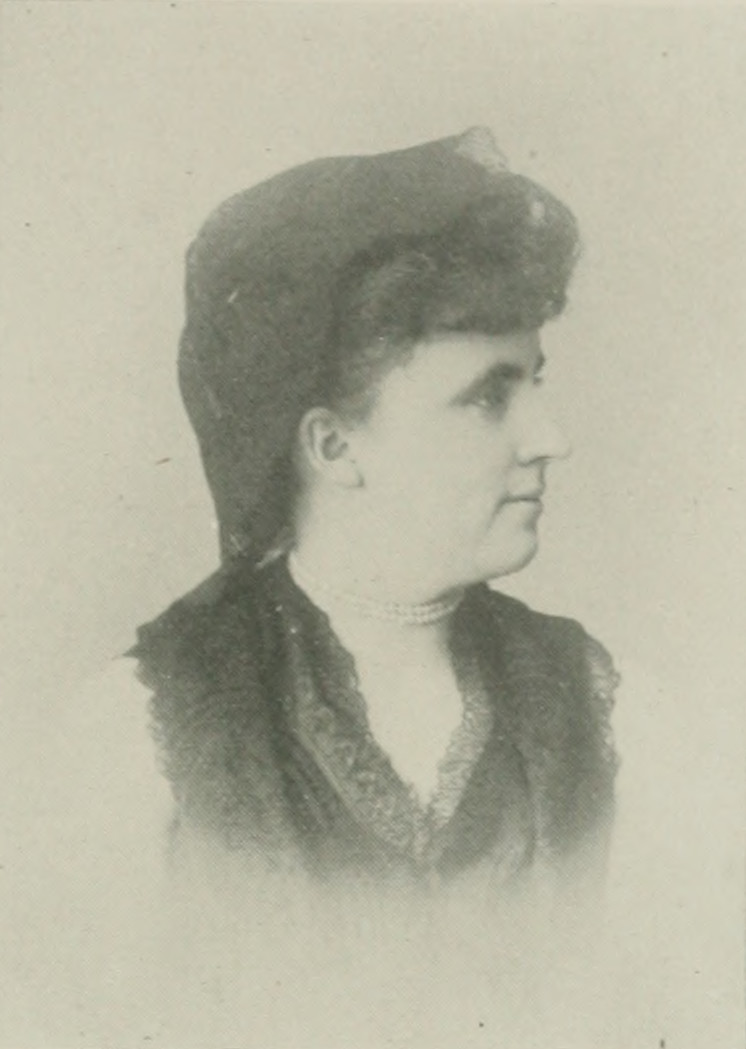
Fannie Douglass Smith

Fannie Douglass Smith Tobey (August 3, 1865 - November 4, 1947) was a journalist.

== Early life ==
Fannie Douglass Smith was born in Middletown, Ohio, on August 3, 1865, the daughter of George Cooper Smith and Emily J. Leadman. When she was a child, her parents moved to Hamilton, Ohio.

She was educated in the public schools of Hamilton.

== Career ==
After leaving school Fannie Douglass Smith devoted her attention for some time to music, taking a course of vocal instruction in the College of Music in Cincinnati, Ohio. She reportedly had a fine soprano voice and was a leading member of the Methodist Episcopal Church choir of Hamilton. She had a local reputation as a singer, and her vocal gifts gave great promise for her future success in that line.

She held the routine of society reporter on the Hamilton Daily Democrat, where she gained considerable reputation.

She was a member of the Unity Club, the leading literary club of Hamilton, and she frequently contributed to the musical as well as the literary parts of its programs.

== Personal life ==
On December 19, 1894, Fannie Douglass Smith married Walter Lawrence Tobey (1870-1938), the owner of the Distinctive Newspaper Features, in Hamilton, Ohio, where Smith had a weekly, 3-column, self-contained "nursery quilt pattern" (as defined by the annual Syndicate Directory supplement published by Editor & Publisher, August 30, 1930) feature distributed from 1929 to 1934.

She died on November 4, 1947, in Cincinnati, Ohio, and is buried at Oxford Cemetery, Oxford, Butler County, Ohio.
