= Michele Moramarco =

Italian author

Michele Moramarco (Reggio Emilia, 6 October 1953) is an Italian author on Masonic ritual and history, a pop musician, and an advocate of Mazdean Christian Universalism. He leads a group of Italian Oddfellows, who started a revival of the procedures followed by the "Loyal Aristarcus Lodge" (1730-1740), the oldest ascertained Oddfellows' unit.

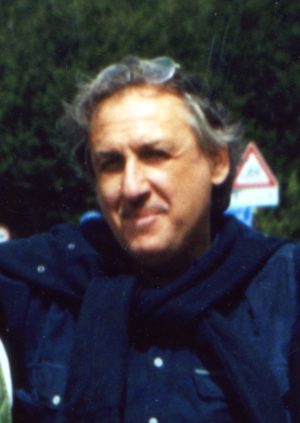

== Works ==
Publications

- La Massoneria ieri e oggi (De Vecchi, Milan 1977)
- Russian translation: Masonstvo v proshlom i nashtoiashem (Progress, Moscow 1991)
- Per una rifondazione del socialismo, in Marxismo e nonviolenza (Lanterna, Genoa 1977)
- Diario californiano (Bastogi, Foggia 1981)
- Grande Dizionario Enciclopedico UTET (4th ed., Turin 1985) (articles Antroposofia, Besant, Cagliostro, Radiestesia, etc.)
- L'ultima tappa di Henry Corbin, in Contributi alla storia dell'Orientalismo, ed. G.R. Franci (Clueb, Bologna 1985)
- 250 anni di Massoneria in Italia (Bastogi, Foggia 1985)
- Nuova Enciclopedia Massonica (Ce.S.A.S., Reggio E. 1989–1995; second ed.: Bastogi, Foggia 1997)
- Psicologia del morire, in I nuovi ultimi (Francisci, Abano Terme 1991)
- Piazza del Gesù (1944-1968). Documenti rari e inediti della tradizione massonica italiana (Ce.SA.S. Reggio Emllia, 1992)
- La celeste dottrina noachita (Ce.S.A.S, Reggio E. 1994)
- I mitici Gufi (Edishow, Reggio Emilia 2001)
- Torbida dea. Psicostoria d'amore, fantomi & zelosia (Bastogi, Foggia 2007)
- Il Mazdeismo Universale. Una chiave esoterica alla dottrina di Zarathushtra (Bastogi, Foggia 2010)
- I Magi eterni. Tra Zarathushtra e Gesù - Una visione mazdeo-cristiana (written with Graziano Moramarco) (Om Edizioni Bolgna 2013)
- La via massonica. Dal manoscritto Graham al risveglio noachide e cristiano (Om Edizioni, Bologna 2014)

Music

- Allucinazioni amorose (meno due) CD (Bastogi Music Italia 2008)
- Masonic Ritual Rhapsody CD (Bastogi Music Italia 2008)
- Gesbitando CD (with Andrea Ascolini) (Bastogi Music Italia 2010)
- Come al crepuscolo l'acacia (Heristal Entertainment, Rome 2013)

== Sources ==
=== Published sources ===
- Chierici, M. (1993-01-19). "Nasce la Lega dei Venerabili". Corriere della Sera (in Italian): 16.
- Ferrari, F. (2008), La Massoneria verso il futuro (una conversazione con Michele Moramarco) (in Italian), Bastogi, Foggia
- Semeraro, S. (January 21, 2006), "Tra la via Emilia e l'Est. Così parlò Zoroastro", La Stampa (in Italian), Torino: 33
- Sari, S. (November 25, 2006), "Unico e plurimo al contempo, Dio secondo gli Zoroastriani [intervista a M.M.]", Libero (in Italian): 13
