= Fannie May Goosby =

American singer

- Also known as: Fannie Mae Goosby
- Born: 1902; Possibly Pinehurst, Georgia, United States
- Died: After 1934
- Genres: Classic female blues
- Occupations: Singer, pianist, songwriter
- Instruments: Vocals, piano
- Years active: 1923–1928
- Labels: Okeh, Brunswick

Fannie May Goosby (born 1902, died after 1934) also known as Fannie Mae Goosby was an American classic female blues singer, pianist and songwriter. Ten of her recordings were released between 1923 and 1928, one of which, "Grievous Blues", she recorded twice. Goosby was one of the first female blues musicians to record her own material. She also was one of the first two blues singers to be recorded in the Deep South, the other being the dirty blues singer Lucille Bogan.

Details of her life outside the recording studio are minimal.

== Biography ==
According to the blues researchers Bob Eagle and Eric S. LeBlanc, Goosby may have been born in Pinehurst, Georgia.

In early June 1923, Polk C. Brockman, an Atlanta-based furniture store owner, who had been instrumental in the distribution of disks for Okeh Records, went to New York to work out a new business deal with Okeh. He was asked if he knew of any artist in Atlanta that could justify a recording trip to Georgia. Brockman promised to return with an answer. At his next meeting with the Okeh Records board, he persuaded Ralph Peer to record Fiddlin' John Carson. At the same recording sessions, probably on June 14, 1923, Peer also recorded "The Pawn Shop Blues", sung by Lucille Bogan, and Goosby singing her own composition "Grievous Blues", for which she accompanied herself on the piano, with a trumpet part played by Henry Mason. It is notable as the first rural blues to be recorded. Goosby wrote most of her own songs, which was then a rarity among female blues singers. Carson, Bogan, and Goosby were subsequently invited to New York to record more tracks. Goosby recorded another version of "Grievous Blues" and five more songs in September and October of that year, all of which were released by Okeh.

Goosby also accompanied Viola Baker in March 1924 on Baker's recording of "Sweet Man Blues".

Goosby recorded another four tracks in March 1928, which appeared on the Brunswick label. One of these was "Fortune Teller Blues", by Levi B. Byron and originally recorded by Geneva Gray on November 4, 1926. Later recordings by Martha Copeland, Viola McCoy, and Rosa Henderson was of another song with the same title, which was composed by Porter Grainger.

Eagle and LeBlanc stated that Goosby was last reported alive in New York around 1934. No further biographical information about her later life has been discovered.

== Songs ==
All songs were written by Goosby, except as indicated otherwise.

Month and year	Title	Songwriter	Record label	Notes
June 1923	"Grievous Blues"		Okeh Records	Recorded in Atlanta
September 1923	"Grievous Blues"		Okeh Records	Recorded in New York
September 1923	"I've Got the Blues, That's All"		Okeh Records	
October 1923	"I Believe My Man Has Got a Rabbit's Leg"		Okeh Records	
October 1923	"Goosby Blues"		Okeh Records	
October 1923	"All Alone Blues"		Okeh Records	
October 1923	"I've Got a Do Right Daddy Now"	Eddie Heywood	Okeh Records	
March 1928	"Fortune Teller Blues"	Levi B. Byron	Brunswick Records	
March 1928	"Can't Use You Blues"		Brunswick Records	
March 1928	"Dirty Moaner Blues"		Brunswick Records	
March 1928	"Stormy Night Blues"		Brunswick Records	

== Compilation albums ==
- Piano Singer's Blues: Women Accompany Themselves (Rosetta Records, 1982) includes Goosby's "Fortune Teller Blues"
- Female Blues Singers Vol. 7 (Document Records, 2005) includes Goosby's "Grievous Blues" and "Goosby Blues"

== See also ==
- List of classic female blues singers
