= Fannie Isabelle Sherrick =

American poet (fl. 1860–1880)

Fannie Isabelle Sherrick Wardell (born 31 May, fl. 1880–1890) was an American poet, essayist, and columnist, best remembered for her romantic and philosophical poetry published in several volumes. Influenced by and a contemporary of Ella Wheeler Wilcox, she was a descendant of Moses Cleaveland and a native of St. Louis, and worked as a teacher.

A character in Henry James' The Portrait of a Lady may be referring to Sherrick's poem "Summer Rain".
