= Radical Harmonies =

2002 American documentary film

- DVD cover artwork
- Directed by: Dee Mosbacher
- Written by: Dee Mosbacher; Lisa Ginsburg
- Produced by: Dee Mosbacher; Boden Sandstrom
- Narrated by: Regina Louise
- Edited by: Lisa Ginsburg; Maria Leech; Dina Maria Munsch
- Distributed by: Woman Vision
- Release date: June 2002
- Running time: 88 minutes
- Country: United States
- Language: English

Radical Harmonies is a 2002 American independent documentary film directed and executive produced by Dee Mosbacher that presents a history of women's music, which has been defined as music by women, for women, and about women. The film was screened primarily at LGBTQ film festivals in 2003 and 2004.

Using archival performance footage, still photographs, and interviews with many women involved in the early years and heyday of women's music, Radical Harmonies presents a history of the genre that one scholar has described as "the soundtrack for the cultural arm of radical feminism". The film depicts "women's music as both a cultural network comprising visual arts, dance, theater, and music, and as a utopian vision of women's community". The interviewees include not only women's music pioneers such as Cris Williamson, Holly Near, Linda Tillery, Mary Watkins, Ferron, Alix Dobkin and Bernice Johnson Reagon but also festival producers, concert promoters, sound engineers, sign language interpreters, dancers, comedians, choral conductors, photographers, journalists, record distributors, and record label executives who were part of the cultural movement that was essentially unknown to mainstream audiences. Younger musicians and bands such as Toshi Reagon, Ubaka Hill, Bitch and Animal, and Tribe 8 are also featured, as well as interviews with mainstream artists Amy Ray and Ani DiFranco who "insist on the importance of the women's music movement to their own careers".

The documentary is a Woman Vision film. Director Mosbacher, a lesbian feminist activist filmmaker and psychiatrist, established Woman Vision as a nonprofit organization "to promote equal treatment of all people through the production and use of educational media". Musicians involved in the film's production include June Millington as associate director, Margie Adam as associate producer, and Judith Casselberry as production consultant.

== Synopsis ==
Radical Harmonies opens with some of the film's participants answering the question "What is women's music?" and makes the point that there is not a single definition of the genre. The film next puts the women's music movement into historical context by linking it to second-wave feminism as well as the civil rights, peace, and labor movements of the 1960s and 1970s in the United States. It discusses the sexism that pervaded the male-dominated music industry in the 1970s, and the struggle of the women's music movement with homophobia within both the larger society as well as the feminist movement. Interviews are conducted with some of the women involved with the sound, lighting, recording, production and record distribution industries, as well as the founding of Olivia and Redwood Records. The origins and scope of women's music festivals is documented, and they are described in the film's narration as "the heart and soul of the movement". The film discusses contributions in the area of accessibility from women's music events to the larger society, recognizing that "sliding scale ticket prices, sign-language interpreters, and wheelchair access … were first instituted in the women's music movement". The broadening of the focus of women's music from "white girls with guitars" to include more women of color and to incorporate other musical genres such as "classical, choral, jazz and improvisation, rhythm and blues, indigenous, non-Western, punk, rock, and nonvocal genres" as well as performance genres such as comedy, dance, and theater is detailed. The film discusses separatism and women-only spaces at some music festivals, and tells the "terrifying and inspirational tale" of two women's "efforts to launch Camp Sister Spirit and the Gulf Coast Women's Festival in Ovett, Mississippi". The women's music response to homophobia in general and specifically the anti-gay rights crusades of Anita Bryant in the mid-1970s is covered. The film ends with interviews and performance segments from a younger, more radical generation of women's music performers, and a "cross-generational conversation among the musicians themselves".

=== Interviewees ===
The following musicians or others involved in the women's music cultural network are named and seen onscreen in an interview setting, usually for small amounts of screen time.

- Amy Ray
- Alix Dobkin
- Amy Horowitz
- Ani DiFranco
- Barbara Price
- Bernice Johnson Reagon
- Bitch and Animal
- Boden Sandstrom
- Bonnie J. Morris
- Brenda and Wanda Hensen
- Cassie Culver
- Catherine Roma
- Cris Williamson
- Debbie Lempke
- Diane Gomez
- Edwina Lee Tyler
- Elizabeth Seja Min
- Ferron
- Ginny Berson
- Gwen Avery
- Havens Levitt
- Hazel Dickens
- Helen Hooke
- Holly Near
- Ivy Young
- Jackie Strano
- Joan E. Biren (JEB)
- Judith Casselberry
- Judy Dlugacz
- Julie Wolf
- June Millington
- Kay Gardner
- Krissy Keefer
- Kristin Lems
- Laurie Fuchs
- Lin Daniels
- Linda Shear
- Linda Tillery
- Lisa Vogel
- Margie Adam
- Mary Byrne
- Mary Watkins
- Maxine Feldman
- Miriam Abrahams
- Nancy Vogl
- Patricia Thumas
- Penny Rosenwasser
- Ramona Galindez
- Rhiannon
- Robin Tyler
- Ronnie Gilbert
- Sherry Hicks
- Slade Bellum
- Sue Fink
- Susan Abod
- Susan Freundlich
- Susann Schanbaum
- Teresa Trull
- Terry Grant
- Toni Armstrong, Jr.
- Toshi Reagon
- Tret Fure
- Ubaka Hill

=== Performances ===
The following musicians, bands, comedians, dance troupes, or sign language interpreters are named and seen in either archival or contemporary performance footage, usually for small amounts of screen time. There are no full-length song performances in the film.

- Alive!
- Alix Dobkin
- Ani DiFranco
- Azucar y Crema
- Barbara Higbie
- Bernice Johnson Reagon
- Bitch and Animal
- The Butchies
- Casselberry-Dupree
- Cassie Culver
- Catherine Roma
- Chicago Women's Liberation Rock Band
- Cris Williamson
- Deidre McCalla
- Dianne Davidson
- Doralynn Folse
- Edwina Lee Tyler
- Ellen Seeling
- Fanny
- Ferron
- Gwen Avery
- The Hail Marys
- Holly Near
- Indigo Girls
- Jackie Strano
- Jean Fineburg
- JUCA
- Judith Casselberry
- June Millington
- Karen Williams
- Kate Clinton
- Kay Gardner
- Kinnie Starr
- Linda Tillery
- Lisa Weems
- Malvina Reynolds
- Margie Adam
- Maria Zemantauski
- Mary Watkins
- Meg Christian
- Melissa Ferrick
- Michigan Womyn's Music Festival Inspirational Choir
- The Murmurs
- Nancy Vogl
- Nedra Johnson
- Patricia Thumas
- Rhiannon
- Robin Flower
- Ronnie Gilbert
- Sexpod
- Shelly Doty
- Sherry Hicks
- Slade Bellum
- Susan Freundlich
- Sweet Honey in the Rock
- Teresa Trull
- Toshi Reagon
- Tret Fure
- Tribe 8
- Ubaka Hill
- Ulali
- Vicki Randle
- The Washington Sisters
- Wild Mango
- Wallflower Order
- The Women's Philharmonic

== Critical response ==
Reviews of the film were mixed. As of December 2018, there are no reviews or scores collected on Rotten Tomatoes or Metacritic.

Scholarly books and journals in general praise the film for its "archival function" and "impassioned testimony" in documenting an important aspect of American lesbian culture from the early 1970s to the late 1990s. The film was described by some critics as "long-awaited" and "celebratory", containing "dazzling concert footage", and as "an impressively comprehensive look at a unique and influential musical subculture". In her book Songs in Black and Lavender, musicologist Eileen Hayes states that "in part because of its medium, celebratory tone, and rockist frame, Sandstrom and Mosbacher's film will dictate the way women's music is perceived for decades to come".

But scholars also criticize the filmmakers for shying away from a "deeper analysis" of the "persistent conflicts around racism and separatism" within the culture of women's music. Multiple scholarly critics noted the complete absence within the film of any mention of the "women-born-women-only policy" or "anti-trans policy" at the Michigan Womyn's Music Festival, despite that controversy generating annual protests outside of the festival site beginning in 1991.

Reviews in the mainstream, alternative, and gay press are also mixed, with male reviewers somewhat less enthusiastic about the film than female reviewers. Dennis Harvey wrote in Variety that the film is a "whirlwind tour through three decades of mostly lesbian-targeted, folk rocking 'women's music' " and "is entertaining on its own terms, but offers little for those not already well-acquainted with this musical scene". In the Chicago Reader, reviewer Patrick McGavin wrote "Although visually and formally plain, the work is enlivened by expressive performances from Holly Near, Ronnie Gilbert, and Sweet Honey in the Rock that showcase the liberating power of the music". The Washington, D.C. gay newspaper Metro Weekly review gave the film five out of five stars, with reviewer Nancy Legato writing "In the sheer volume of footage and inclusion of voices, Mosbacher … has managed a huge accomplishment". In two different newspapers in Miami, a male reviewer deemed the film "mildly compelling", while a female reviewer described it as "lively", "bursting with terrific live clips" and featuring "insightful interviews".

A review in Library Journal, which helps librarians with purchasing decisions, concluded with "strongly recommended for all women's studies and music collections". As of December 2018, the film is held in 227 libraries worldwide.

== Screenings ==
The film was shown primarily at LGBTQ film festivals in the United States between 2003 and 2004. It has also been shown at benefits for women's organizations or other non-profit organizations, as well as at some colleges and universities, usually as part of classes or workshops on feminism, gender equality, or gay studies.

- San Francisco International Lesbian and Gay Film Festival (Frameline) (World premiere: June 28, 2002)
- Benefit for Astraea's Lynn Campbell Memorial Fund (New York City premiere, October 21, 2002)
- Screening sponsored by the Women's Studies Department, Massachusetts Institute of Technology (November 23, 2002)
- London Lesbian and Gay Film Festival (April 3, 2003)
- Miami Gay and Lesbian Film Festival (April 27, 2003)
- Boston Gay and Lesbian Film Festival (May 2, 2003)
- Connecticut Gay & Lesbian Film Festival (June 6, 2003)
- Seattle International Film Festival (June 7, 2003)
- Fundraising benefit for ImageOut: The Rochester Lesbian and Gay Film & Video Festival (June 19, 2003)
- Outfest Los Angeles (July 2003)
- Nashville Gay and Lesbian Film Festival (September 2003)
- Milwaukee LGBT Film & Video Festival (October 11, 2003)
- Pittsburgh International Lesbian and Gay Film Festival (October 24, 2003)
- Paris Cineffable International Lesbian and Feminist Film Festival (November 8 and 9, 2003)
- St. Louis International Film Festival (November 15, 2003)
- Minneapolis/St. Paul LGBT Film Festival (November 17, 2003)
- Reeling 2003: The Chicago Lesbian and Gay International Film Festival (November 2003)
- Benefit for the Institute for the Musical Arts (IMA)'s Rock 'n' Roll Camp for Teen Girls Scholarship Fund (February 15, 2004)
- Southern Arizona Wingspan LGBT Film Festival (March 7, 2004)
- Kingston ReelOut Queer Film and Video Festival (March 10, 2004)
- Reykjavik Gay and Lesbian Film Festival (March 13, 2004)
- Women in the Director's Chair International Film & Video Festival (March 20, 2004)
- Boston Gay and Lesbian Film Festival (May 8, 2004)
- Knoxville Heritage Night (May 26, 2004)
- Kalamazoo YWCA (June 13, 2006)
- Kalamazoo Public Library (March 29, 2007)
- Kunst Kultur Frauenfeste Clubnächte, Vienna Austria (April 16, 2009)
- Benefit for the Women's Museum of California at Art Rocks Film, San Diego (August 16, 2015)
- The Freight and Salvage, Berkeley, California, in celebration of Women's History Month (March 9, 2025)
- National Women's Music Festival, Middleton, Wisconsin: keynote presentation with panel discussion following the screening, featuring Mosbacher, Sandstrom, Linda Tillery and Margie Adam (July 4, 2025)

== Awards ==
- 2002: Won Best Documentary (audience award) at the 26th San Francisco International Lesbian and Gay Film Festival
- 2003: Won the audience award for Outstanding Soundtrack at Outfest, the Los Angeles LGBT film festival
