= Lesbian Concentrate =

Compilation album
- Released: 1 January 1977
- Genres: Folk, pop, spoken word, women's music
- Label: Olivia Records

Lesbian Concentrate: A Lesbianthology of Songs and Poems is a compilation of music and spoken word by lesbian artists. It was released by Olivia Records in 1977 in response to Anita Bryant's anti-gay crusade "Save Our Children".

The album's cover – a reference to Bryant's role as spokeswoman for the Florida Citrus Commission – has more recently received attention due to its inclusion on several "worst album covers ever" lists.

== Critical reception ==
Country in Lesbian Tide described the album as "political and cultural, as well as entertaining", that would "leave you spellbound". Ilona Laney in The Body Politic said Lesbian Concentrate was "the best record to give someone as their first album of women's music". In off our backs, Mer described the album as a "mixed bag... but it is also an affirmation of diversity, a striking convergence of different expressions of women". Women's studies scholar Bonnie J. Morris dubbed the album "the most racially and stylistically diverse" of women's music.

== Track listing ==
| No. | Title | Writer(s) | Performer(s) | Length |
|---|---|---|---|---|
| 1. | "Don't Pray For Me" | Mary Watkins | Linda Tillery | 5:22 |
| 2. | "Nina" | Meg Christian | Meg Christian and Holly Near | 3:35 |
| 3. | "Prove It On Me Blues" | Ma Rainey | Teresa Trull | 2:17 |
| 4. | "Sweet Woman" | Cris Williamson and Jennifer Wysong | Cris Williamson | 3:37 |
| 5. | "A History of Lesbianism" | Judy Grahn | Judy Grahn | 1:46 |
| 6. | "Gay and Proud" | Debbie Lempke | Berkeley Women's Music Collective | 3:28 |
| 7. | "Leaping Lesbians" | Sue Fink and Joelyn Grippo | Sue Fink | 2:49 |
| 8. | "Sugar Mama" | Gwen Avery | Gwen Avery | 4:16 |
| 9. | "Kahlua Mama" | Virginia Rubino and Gioia Siciliano | BeBe K'Roche | 3:50 |
| 10. | "No Hiding Place" | Watkins | Mary Watkins | 4:39 |
| 11. | "For Straight Folks Who Don't Mind Gays But Wish They Weren't So Blatant" | Pat Parker | Pat Parker | 2:16 |
| 12. | "Ode to a Gym Teacher" | Christian | Christian | 4:14 |
| 13. | "Woman-Loving Women" | Teresa Trull | Trull | 3:58 |
| Total length: | | | | 46:17 |
