= Ruth Dworin =

Feminist, activist, and music producer

Ruth Dworin is a feminist, women's activist, sound engineer, music producer and concert organizer based in Toronto, Canada. She is the owner of music production company Womynly Way Productions, an important contributor to the women's music scene in Toronto during the 1980s.

Dworin was introduced to feminism from a women's workshop at the Philadelphia Folk Festival. She moved to Canada in the 1970s, settling in Toronto. Dworin was an important part of the women's festival scene in the United States, sitting on the board of directors of the Association of Women's Music and Culture. She was actively involved in the women's cultural scene in Toronto in the 1980s and 1990s and was involved in the publication of The Other Woman and Broadside: A Feminist Newspaper. She viewed her involvement in music production as a political act, reflecting: "[m]aking culture is a way of shaping how people perceive the world and it's a powerful and relatively painless [activity]."

== Music production and concert organizing ==
Ruth Dworin founded music production company Womanly Way Productions in 1980. She organized concerts in Toronto and southern Ontario featuring women performers. She established an open door policy for her concerts, advertising in both queer and mainstream media. This occasionally led to controversy within the lesbian and feminist communities. In addition to music production, the company also offered workshops on sound and light editing.

In an interview, Dworin noted:

...when I put on a concert, I'm trying to do two things. One is to provide the meeting place, the sustenance, the emotional support for the lesbian-feminist community. I know I need that! I wasn't getting enough of it in Toronto. But the other thing I'm trying to do is outreach – to attract the broader audience, to make some of the people politically aware.

In the 1980s, Dworin's company organized multiple one-day festival events featuring women. Some notable performers included Holly Near, Meg Christian, Alix Dobkin, Lucie Blue Tremblay, Lillian Allen, Cris Williamson and Heather Bishop. She focused on making events accessible to disabled people, including the hearing-impaired, and those who use wheelchairs, as well as providing childcare at all events.

Some festivals she produced included:

- Spectrum: A Festival of Music, Theatre, Dance, Skillbuilding and Strategizing (1985);
- Jointing Hands: A Deaf and Hearing Theatre and Music Festival (1987);
- WACCO (Women Across Canada Culturally Organizing) Tour (1987); and
- Colourburst: Multicultural Women in the Arts Festival (1987).

Womynly Way Productions also put on joint events, including:

- Spirit of Turtle Island: Native Women's Festival, co-produced with Dakota-Ojibway Productions (1985) and
- Rainbow Women's Festival, co-produced with Multicultural Womyn in Concert (1984).

Some records related to Womynly Way Productions were collected by the University of Ottawa as part of the Canadian Women's Movement Archives.

== Collecting ==
Dworin, along with Kathy Lewis and Lucia Kimber founded the Women's Music Archives in the fall of 1978. The group's aim was "to collect and preserve, for herstorical listening and research purposes, all types of materials related to women's music." This material was eventually deposited with the Sophia Smith Collection in 2004.

Dworin was also an avid collector of lesbian pulp fiction novels. This collection was featured in the 1991 documentary Forbidden Love: The Unashamed Stories of Lesbian Lives. In 2005 she donated her collection to York University Archives & Special Collections, along with her personal papers which contain recordings of the Michigan Womyn's Music Festival.

== Interviews ==
- Womynly Way: An Introduction with Ruth Dworin. Fuse, volume 8, issue 3.
- "Upfront: What keeps Ruth Dworin Producing concerts? Edna Baker Finds Out. Music, Money, Politics and Lipstick", The Body Politic, January–February 1983, issue 90, p. 37–38.

== Publications ==
- Ruth Dworin, "My Horror Story", The Other Woman, vol. 4 no. 1 (December – January 1976) 12–13.
- Ruth Dworin, "Separatism: Strategy or Solution?", LOOT Newsletter, (May 1979) 4.
- Ruth Dworin, "Bad Relations", The Body Politic, (April 1982) 4.

== Resources ==
- Ruth Dworin Collection. Exhibit by Renee Jackson. Clara Thomas Archive & Special Collections, York University
- Listing of Ruth Dworin Collection of lesbian pulp fiction, comic books and zines. Clara Thomas Archives & Special Collections, York University
- Feminist Music
