= Teresa Trull =

American singer-songwriter and musician

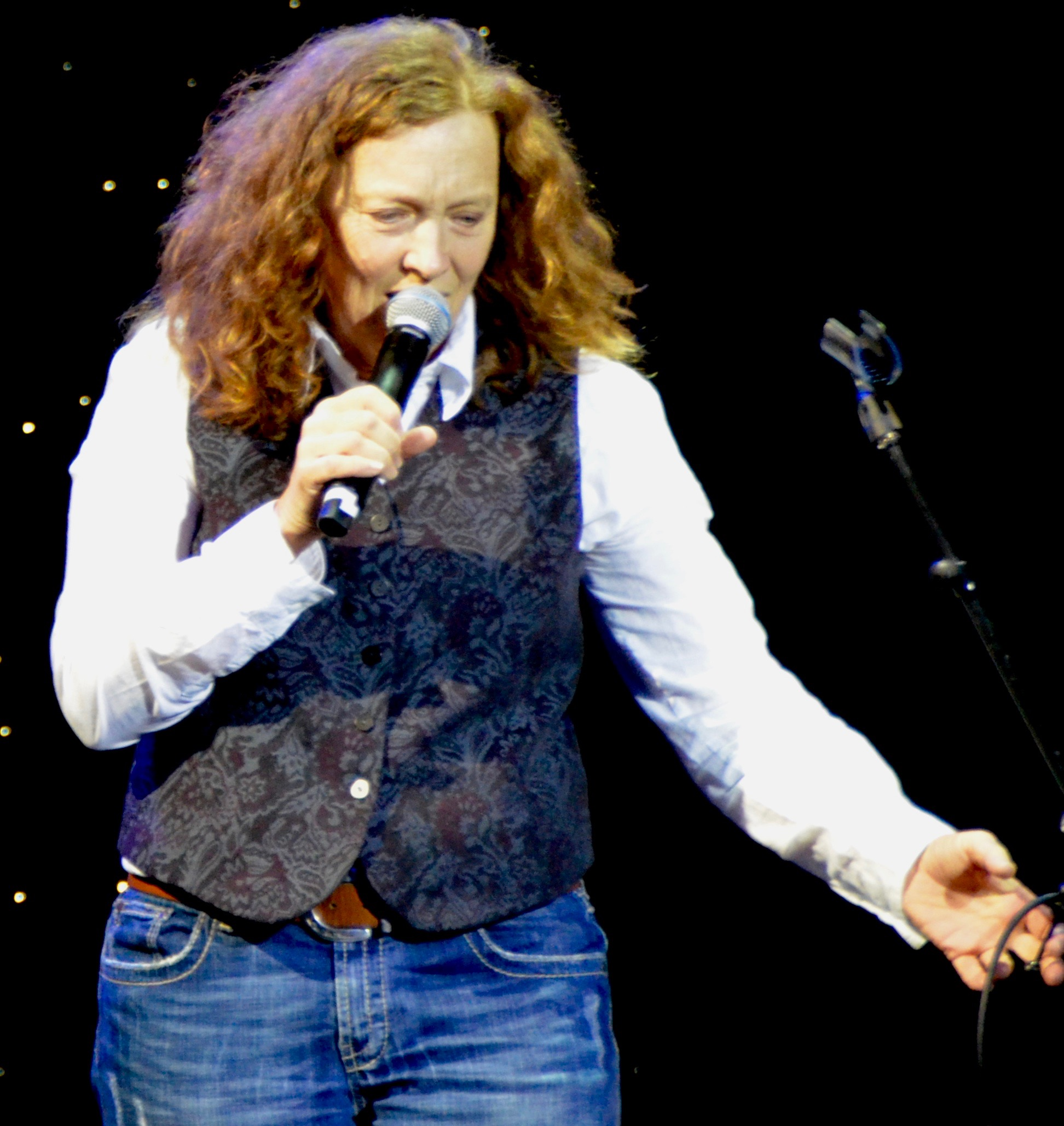
- Trull performing in 2013

Background information
- Born: Margaret Teresa Trull; June 20, 1954 (age 72); Durham, North Carolina, U.S.
- Genres: Folk; folk rock; R&B; country folk; pop
- Occupations: Singer-songwriter; musician; producer; horse trainer
- Instruments: Vocals; guitar; piano
- Years active: 1977–present
- Labels: Olivia; Second Wave; Redwood; Slowbaby

Teresa Trull (born June 20, 1954) is an American female singer, musician, songwriter, and record producer from Durham, North Carolina. She is recognized as a pioneer in Women's music, with her debut album The Ways a Woman Can Be released on Olivia Records in 1977.

She has recorded two albums with Barbara Higbie and one with Cris Williamson. She has toured and recorded with Bonnie Hayes, David Sanborn, Andy Narell, Darol Anger, Mike Marshall, Alex DeGrassi, Joan Baez, Linda Tillery, Cris Williamson, Holly Near, and Tracy Nelson. She has performed all over the world, from Puerto Rico to Egypt, and Costa Rica to Greece.

Trull has also worked as a songwriter, with The Whispers among others. She was twice nominated for Best Producer of an Independent Album by the New York Music Awards.

== Early life ==
Trull was raised part-time on a chicken farm and part-time in Durham, North Carolina. Her parents always struggled financially, with her father living in a trailer at the corner of two highways. Trull refers to her father's family as "hillbillies"; her father didn't leave the mountains of Tennessee until he was 25 years old. She spent a lot of time in her youth playing in the woods by herself, for example imagining herself as an Irish battle queen in full regalia which became the subject of a song later in her life. She developed a love of horses and other animals, riding horses as young as age three.

Trull sang in churches as a child, which served as her initial introduction to music. Later in life she ventured into folk and rock music, but as a teenager her passion was singing gospel music in church.

Trull left home at age sixteen, after her mother died. During high school, she played guitar in a band. At a school talent show, Trull substituted on vocals for an ill bandmate on a day that a rock band was in attendance. Soon afterwards, Trull started attending Duke University on a full scholarship to study chemistry and intended to become a researcher. She quickly became disillusioned with what she witnessed in research labs, so four weeks into her first year of college when members of Ed's Bush Band asked her to tour with them, she jumped at the chance to earn a living by singing. She played in rock & roll groups in the early 1970s on the East Coast and Southern United States. At age nineteen, Trull relocated to New York City.

== Solo career ==
=== Olivia Records ===
While she was living in New York, some friends of Trull's sent a tape of her music to Olivia Records, then located in Los Angeles, California. Olivia was a fledgling women-only record company, devoted to recording music by women, for women, and about women. The Olivia collective was interested in recording Trull, but had other projects in the works. They encouraged Trull to move to LA, and gave her a job in the company's packing and shipping department until her recording could take place. Afterwards, she was named as one of the organization's "new executive staff members".

Trull's first album with Olivia was The Ways A Woman Can Be released in 1977. It was Olivia's fifth LP release and two singles were released as well. The album's style is primarily folk-rock with R&B, gospel, and country influences, and contains several songs with overt lesbian and/or feminist lyrics, such as "Woman-Loving Women" and "Don't Say Sister (Until You Mean It)." Six of the album's eight songs were composed by Trull, most of them written when she was between the ages of 16 and 20.

Also in 1977, Olivia released the compilation album Lesbian Concentrate in response to Anita Bryant's anti-gay crusade. Two Trull performances were included on the LP: "Prove It On Me Blues" (composed by Gertrude "Ma" Rainey) and "Woman-Loving Women" (composed by Trull).

Olivia released a second Trull LP in 1980 titled Let It Be Known. This album also contains overtly lesbian and feminist lyrics ("There's A Light" and "Every Woman"), but the musical styles are funk, jazz, and pop. Guest musicians included some well-known artists from within the women's music community, such as Julie Homi, Linda Tillery, Ellen Seeling and Jean Fineberg from the group Deuce, as well as mainstream artists such as Sheila E. on drums and percussion.

The LP generated some controversy within the lesbian-feminist community because two of the songs were co-written by Trull and a man, Ray Obiedo. Prior to this LP, all Olivia recordings were completely women-only projects, including artists, composers, and technicians. The LP's cover was criticized by some because Trull was wearing make-up in the photograph and there were accusations that Olivia intentionally put sexually oriented subliminal messages on the cover of the LP. The criticism of Let It Be Known from within the lesbian community contributed to the resignation of the Olivia staffer who was the graphic designer of the cover. The recording was also criticized by some for being too commercial in its sound, with one reviewer going so far as to call it a "dull collection of every slick disco cliché."

But Let It Be Known was also credited with expanding Olivia's audience. It received positive reviews in some major newspapers, including The Boston Globe which described it as "delightful" and "an upbeat LP that approaches those hackneyed themes of love and sisterhood with a fresh underpinning of gospel, funk, and jazz."

Years later, Trull reflected on the lessons she learned working on Let It Be Known. The intention of the LP was to produce it with all women, but to make it more technically viable than previous Olivia recordings. She described the recording as a "total financial bomb" and a "big nightmare" to make, because of the desire to use women musicians who may not have the studio experience to give the producer what they want in an efficient manner, which increased the costs of the recording process. While Trull did not produce Let It Be Known, she remembered the experiences later in her career when she was responsible for the finances of other recordings.

During the late 1970s and early 1980s, Trull frequently toured with jazz pianist Julie Homi. One Canadian concert reviewer wrote: "Singer Teresa Trull and pianist Julie Homi both showed the type of talent that should have them all over the record charts and gossip mags, but because they have chosen to work entirely in the world of 'women's music,' they generally play in front of dedicated cults only."

Trull left the Olivia collective around 1981, citing a "difference in philosophy." She was a budding producer and wanted Olivia's recordings to be of high technicianship, and she was willing to work with men. At the time, Olivia president Judy Dlugacz wanted to continue to depend on the markets the company had always used and to remain separatist. Even though she resigned her administrative position with Olivia, Trull continued to record with the company's subsidiary label, Second Wave Records.

=== Redwood Records ===
In 1986, Trull released a CD on Redwood Records titled A Step Away. Trull wrote or co-wrote six of the nine songs and also produced the recording. The album was intentionally more pop-oriented than her prior recordings, in an attempt to appeal to a broader audience than the traditional women's music community. It was recorded at Ocean Way Studios in Los Angeles and featured vocalists Bonnie Hayes and Vicki Randle. Hayes also wrote or co-wrote two of the songs, including "Rosalie" which was originally to be recorded by Huey Lewis. Lewis turned down the song and so Trull decided to use it on her album, and it has become one of Trull's signature songs. Veteran record producer Stewart Levine called A Step Away "one of the best producing efforts he'd ever heard for its limited budget." The CD sold out the first 10,000 copies within a month and the recording industry trade magazine Cash Box included A Step Away as a "Featured Pick" in November 1986. This was the last solo album released by Trull; her subsequent CDs have been collaborative efforts with Barbara Higbie and Cris Williamson.

In 1987, Trull toured as a background singer with The Bonnie Hayes Band as the opening act for Huey Lewis and the News on a national tour that included stadium-sized audiences. Trull described the experience as "a real eye opener….What I saw was a lifestyle that I didn't want any part of. You become a marketable product. You make decisions based on business and not on music."

== Collaboration with Barbara Higbie ==
Trull met Barbara Higbie at a rodeo in Reno, Nevada in July 1982. They were on the same bill together and Trull admired Higbie's fiddle playing and musicianship. In August, the two musicians played together at a party and received a standing ovation after their first song, so they decided to see where the collaboration would take them. Their musical styles were quite different, with Higbie performing primarily in New Age and jazz genres, and Trull emphasizing gospel- and R&B-influenced sounds.

Trull and Higbie's first album together Unexpected was released on Olivia's Second Wave subsidiary label in 1983. Trull also acted as producer on this recording, with a budget of about $10,000. Trull and Higbie toured across the U.S. in support of this album, and a song from Unexpected ("Tell The Truth") was taken to space by an American astronaut. Of this album, a Boston Globe reporter wrote: it "is a wildly and sometimes wonderfully disparate collection of mostly original tunes that speak primarily about ladies, love, and letting go." It was also included in The Boston Globe's Guide to Best Albums of 1983.

Trull and Higbie broke up their musical and personal relationship in the mid-1980s, and both pursued solo careers. They reunited again for a performance at the 1991 Michigan Women's Music Festival and received a standing ovation from the 10,000 women in attendance, which inspired the pair to tour again beginning in 1992.

They released a second album together in 1997, titled Playtime on the Slowbaby label, and embarked on a 40-city tour in support of that recording. Like their previous album, Playtime was produced by Trull, with production assistance from Higbie.

Trull and Higbie continue to perform together occasionally, including on Olivia Travel cruises.

== Collaboration with Cris Williamson ==
In 1988, Trull was producing an album for Hunter Davis and she hired women's music icon Cris Williamson to sing a duet with Davis, to help with the marketing of the LP. Even though they had been good friends for 10 years, that was the first time that Williamson had worked with Trull in the role of producer. After Davis's album Torn was completed, Williamson approached Trull to make a country album together. Both women had spent their childhoods in rural, agricultural areas with a love of country music.

The result was the album Country Blessed, released in 1989 on Olivia's Second Wave label. They wrote many of the lyrics together, and shared lead vocals as well as performing two duets. The album also featured many musical guests, including Mike Marshall, Darol Anger, Barbara Higbie, Vicki Randle, John Bucchino, and Laurie Lewis.

Country Blessed received positive reviews in both the mainstream and alternative press. The Washington Post review described the album as "a spirited set of superbly crafted country-influenced pop".

== Career as record producer ==
In addition to a career as a musician, Trull has produced over 30 albums for herself and other artists including Cris Williamson, Deidre McCalla, Romanovsky and Phillips, Barbara Higbie, Hunter Davis and The Washington Sisters. Higbie said she feels Trull "has become an excellent producer. I've played on enough sessions that she has produced that I'm confident she can get the sound I'm looking for." Higbie said that in the role of producer, Trull is "in charge of the mechanics of getting everyone there, the way they work together, the intonation and the timing, the instrumentation, overseeing everything, making certain my vision becomes a reality."

For her production work on Deidre McCalla's album Don't Doubt It, Trull was nominated for the 1985 New York Music Awards Best Producer of an Independent Album. She was nominated for the same award again in 1989. Trull was also described by the San Francisco Bay Guardian as "probably the best 'alternative' record producer in the Bay Area."

== Career as songwriter ==
Trull began writing songs as a teenager, describing herself at that time as "a completely self-taught singer/songwriter from the country." Her first album featured six of her compositions. On her second album, two of the songs were co-written by Trull and Ray Obiedo, who lived next door to Trull in East Oakland, California at the time. Trull had asked Obiedo to write a song with her for her upcoming LP and he agreed. This marked the beginning of a songwriting partnership between Trull and Obiedo that lasted 5 years (1980–1985) and resulted in approximately 50 songs co-written with Obiedo. The most commercially successful songs written by this pair were recorded in 1983 by The Whispers on their gold album Love for Love: the title track and "Try It Again".

Trull's compositions have also been recorded by George Benson and Casiopea. In addition to solo songwriting credits on all of her albums, Trull has also co-written songs with Gary Marks, Paul Davis, S. Burns, Julie Homi, Mary Watkins, and Cris Williamson.

== Non-musical career ==
After the tour with Hayes and Lewis ended in 1987, Trull became disillusioned with the music business. She took a break from performing, focusing instead on producing music and training horses. Trull has always had a love of animals, particularly horses. Around this time, the manager of an Arabian horse farm in Los Angeles gave Trull a horse as a gift in return for Trull having taught her learning-challenged child to sing. Trull went looking for a place to keep the horse in the San Francisco Bay Area, where she lived. The last site that Trull visited was a small breeding ranch and she became friends with the owner. Having apprenticed in the horse training business while also pursuing her music career, eventually Trull became the full-time ranch manager and horse trainer.

Trull is also an experienced dressage rider. In 1996, she and Creeky Routson formed a company named "Wild Ride" that specialized in choreography for freestyle dressage competitions, in which horses perform high-level dressage to music. Years later, Trull and Routson were asked by Kate van Orden, a University of California, Berkeley musicologist to take on the role of equestrian choreographers for van Orden's reconstruction of the 17th century equestrian extravaganza known as Le Carrousel du Roi, which was originally created to honor the marriage of King Louis XIII of France. The first production of this reconstructed "equestrian ballet" was presented on June 9 and 10, 2000 at the city of Walnut Creek, California's Heather Farm Park. Nineteen dancing horses were shared by fifteen riders in extravagant costumes, accompanied by Robert Ballard's 1612 music on period instruments. Following on the success of the event in 2000, it was presented again in June 2012, with new elements and refinements.

In summer 2011, Trull moved from the Bay Area to New Zealand. She and New Zealand native Michaela Evans started a business named "New Zealand Horse Help", which specializes in a range of services including behavioral problem solving, starting and training young horses, and advanced skills. In November 2012, Trull and Evans were invited to participate in New Zealand's "Equidays" to demonstrate their training techniques to improve the relationship between horse and rider, and in particular their specialized methods of connecting with an unbroken horse. Trull and New Zealand entertainer Jools Topp also performed musically at the two-day event, held at the Mystery Creek Events Centre.

== Personal life ==
Trull is openly lesbian. She was linked romantically with Barbara Higbie, although that relationship ended in the mid-1980s and Higbie has since married a man.

Trull served on the faculty and Board of Advisors of the Institute for the Musical Arts (IMA), a non-profit teaching, performing and recording facility co-founded by June Millington whose mission is to support women in music and music-related businesses.

Trull and Linda Tillery were guest lecturers at a San Francisco State University class on women's music taught by Angela Davis.

In addition to horses, Trull loves birds and other animals. She has bred and shown English budgies. In 1989, she said she owned 35 birds, including a parrot. In a 2004 interview, Trull said she owned two horses, two dogs, two birds, two house cats, a barn cat, twelve guinea hens, and four goats.

Before friends sent a tape of an early Trull performance to Olivia Records, she worked as a dump truck driver.

Trull has described herself as "a total sports junkie." She was invited to sing the national anthem at a Golden State Warriors basketball game on December 4, 1988. The game was sold-out, with sixteen thousand people in the arena. She described the evening as "one of the most incredible music experiences" in her life, and she received a standing ovation for the performance, as well as the opportunity to sit behind the team bench.

Trull has a black belt in karate.

In 1988, Trull's hometown of Durham, NC surprised her with a "This Is Your Life" type of gala, at which she was presented a key to the city and a special citizen's award from the mayor.

== Discography ==
=== Studio albums ===
Album title	Record label	Stock number	Release year
The Ways a Woman Can Be	Olivia	LF 910	1977
Let it Be Known	Olivia	LF923	1980
Unexpected (with Barbara Higbie)	Second Wave	ORCD22001	1983
A Step Away	Redwood	RR412	1986
Country Blessed (with Cris Williamson)	Second Wave	CD 22013	1989
Playtime (with Barbara Higbie)	Slowbaby	CD8-2212-2	1997

=== Singles and EPs ===
Song title(s)	Album title	Record label	Stock number	Release year	Note(s)
"Woman-Loving Women"	The Ways A Woman Can Be	Olivia	LF916	1977	7", 45 RPM / B side to Gwen Avery's "Sugar Mama"
"Unexpected"/"Tell The Truth"	Unexpected	Second Wave	LP 22001	1983	7", 45 RPM

==== Video singles ====
- "Flow" (2009)

=== Various artist compilation albums ===
Album title	Record label	Stock number	Release year	Song title(s)
Lesbian Concentrate	Olivia	LF915	1977	"Prove It On Me Blues"
Lesbian Concentrate	Olivia	LF915	1977	"Woman-Loving Women"
Great Acoustics	Philo	PH-1101	1985	"Muddy Water Blues" (with Barbara Higbie)
Michigan Live '85	August Night	MF 010	1986	"On Our Way" (with Barbara Higbie)
Michigan Live '85	August Night	MF 010	1986	"You In My Life"
Certain Damage! volume 22	CMJ	CD-022	1989	"Keep On" (with Cris Williamson)
Claire of the Moon soundtrack	Demi-Monde	<unknown>	1992	"Could It Hurt"
NWMF Silver: Celebrating the 25th anniversary of the National Women's Music Festival	WIA	WIAR-25	1999	"High and Dry" (with Barbara Higbie)
NWMF Silver: Celebrating the 25th anniversary of the National Women's Music Festival	WIA	WIAR-25	1999	"You Upset Me" (with Barbara Higbie)

=== Producer credits ===
Album title	Album artist(s)	Record label	Stock number	Release year	Note(s)
Unexpected	Teresa Trull and Barbara Higbie	Second Wave	LP 22001	1983	
Trouble in Paradise	Romanovsky and Phillips	Fresh Fruit	FF 102	1985, reissued 2009	
Don't Doubt It	Deidre McCalla	Olivia	LF939	1985	produced and arranged by Trull
A Step Away	Teresa Trull	Redwood	RRCD 412	1986	
With a Little Luck	Deidre McCalla	Olivia	LF953	1987	
Understated	The Washington Sisters	SHSAWA Music	SHSA221CD	1987	
Torn	Hunter Davis	Redwood	RR8803	1988	
Country Blessed	Cris Williamson and Teresa Trull	Second Wave	CD 22013	1989	
Time Turns the Moon	Tret Fure	Second Wave	CD 22015	1990	
Take Two	The Washington Sisters	SHSAWA Music	SHSA222CD	1991	
Everyday Heroes and Heroines	Deidre McCalla	Olivia	ORCD965	1992	
Transformations	Lucie Blue Tremblay	Olivia	ORCD967	1992	
Hopeful Romantic	Ron Romanovsky	Fresh Fruit	FF 105	1992	
JustBecause	Mary Paulson	Palmay Music	CD1-95	1995	
Playtime	Barbara Higbie and Teresa Trull	Slowbaby	CD8-2212-2	1997	with production assistance by Barbara Higbie
Ready to Fly	Calaveras	Fennel & Mustard Records	<unknown>	1998	
Ashes	Cris Williamson	Wolf Moon	5403	2001	
Playing for Keeps	Deidre McCalla	MaidenRock	MRK 3050	2003	co-produced with Laurie Lewis
Real Deal	Cris Williamson	Wolf Moon	WMR65406	2005	

=== Songwriter credits ===
Song title	Album artist(s)	Album title	Record label	Stock number	Release year
"Basin Street" (co-written with Ray Obiedo)	Linda Tillery	Secrets	411 Records	BLF 736	1985
"Be Careful" (co-written with Ray Obiedo)	Teresa Trull	Let it Be Known	Olivia	LF923	1980
"Carry It On" (co-written with Ray Obiedo)	Teresa Trull	Let it Be Known	Olivia	LF923	1980
"A Change" (co-written with Barbara Higbie)	Teresa Trull and Barbara Higbie	Unexpected	Second Wave	LP 22001	1983
"Could It Hurt"	<various artists>	Claire of the Moon soundtrack	Demi-Monde	<unknown>	1992
"Count On Me" (co-written with Ray Obiedo)	Linda Tillery	Secrets	411 Records	BLF 736	1985
"Country Blessed" (co-written with Paul Davis and Cris Williamson)	Cris Williamson and Teresa Trull	Country Blessed	Second Wave	CD 22013	1989
"Don't Say Sister (Until You Mean It)	Teresa Trull	The Ways a Woman Can Be	Olivia	LF 910	1977
"Fertanga" (co-written with Cris Williamson)	Cris Williamson and Teresa Trull	Country Blessed	Second Wave	CD 22013	1989
"Flow"	Teresa Trull	<video single>	n/a	n/a	2009
"Gimme Just a Little Bit More (or a Little Bit Less)"	Teresa Trull	The Ways a Woman Can Be	Olivia	LF 910	1977
"Grey Day"	Teresa Trull	The Ways a Woman Can Be	Olivia	LF 910	1977
"Heart On the Line"	Teresa Trull	A Step Away	Redwood	RR412	1986
"High and Dry" (co-written with Barbara Higbie)	Teresa Trull and Barbara Higbie	Unexpected	Second Wave	LP 22001	1983
"High and Dry" (co-written with Barbara Higbie)	<various artists>	NWMF Silver: Celebrating the 25th anniversary of the National Women's Music Festival	WIA	WIAR-25	1999
"How Lucky" (co-written with Ray Obiedo)	Teresa Trull	A Step Away	Redwood	RR412	1986
"I Hope She'll See"	Teresa Trull	The Ways a Woman Can Be	Olivia	LF 910	1977
"Keep On" (co-written with Paul Davis)	Cris Williamson and Teresa Trull	Country Blessed	Second Wave	CD 22013	1989
"Love For Love" (co-written with Ray Obiedo)	The Whispers	Love For Love	The Right Stuff/Capitol	57533	1983
"Make Believe" (co-written with Ray Obiedo)	Gwen McCrae	On My Way	Atlantic Records	78-0019-1	1982
"The Meaning of Love" (co-written with Mary Watkins)	Teresa Trull	Let it Be Known	Olivia	LF923	1980
"Musicians" (co-written with Julie Homi)	Teresa Trull	Let it Be Known	Olivia	LF923	1980
"No Matter" (co-written with Paul Davis)	Teresa Trull	A Step Away	Redwood	RR412	1986
"Now That I've Found You (Helpless)" (co-written with Ray Obiedo)	Zorina	Fat Gaines Band Presents Zorina: Born To Dance	Avamar Records	Ava1101	1983
"On Our Way" (co-written with Ray Obiedo)	Teresa Trull	A Step Away	Redwood	RR412	1986
"On Our Way" (co-written with Ray Obiedo)	<various artists>	Michigan Live '85	August Night	MF 010	1986
"Precious" (co-written with Ray Obiedo)	Teresa Trull and Barbara Higbie	Unexpected	Second Wave	LP 22001	1983
"Right Back" (co-written with Ray Obiedo)	Teresa Trull	A Step Away	Redwood	RR412	1986
"Second Chance"	Teresa Trull	The Ways a Woman Can Be	Olivia	LF 910	1977
"Secrets" (co-written with Ray Obiedo)	Linda Tillery	Secrets	411 Records	BLF 736	1985
"The Shady Glen"	Cris Williamson and Teresa Trull	Country Blessed	Second Wave	CD 22013	1989
"Special Kind of Love" (co-written with Ray Obiedo)	Linda Tillery	Secrets	411 Records	BLF 736	1985
"A Step Away" (co-written with Gary Marks)	Teresa Trull	A Step Away	Redwood	RR412	1986
"Sway of Her Hips" (co-written with S. Burns)	Barbara Higbie and Teresa Trull	Playtime	Slowbaby	CD8-2212-2	1997
"Take A Chance" (co-written with David Shields and Nicholas Ten Broeck)	Pastiche	That's R & B-Bop	Nova Records	NOVA 8707–01	1987
"Tell the Truth"	Teresa Trull and Barbara Higbie	Unexpected	Second Wave	LP 22001	1983
"Try It Again" (co-written with Ray Obiedo)	The Whispers	Love For Love	The Right Stuff/Capitol	57533	1983
"Unexpected"	Teresa Trull and Barbara Higbie	Unexpected	Second Wave	LP 22001	1983
"Wings"	Barbara Higbie and Teresa Trull	Playtime	Slowbaby	CD8-2212-2	1997
"Wings"	Blackberry Winter	Still Standing	Juneapple Records	JAPL105	2013
"With a Little Luck" (co-written with Deidre McCalla and Ray Obiedo)	Deidre McCalla	With a Little Luck	Olivia	LF953	1987
"Woman-Loving Women"	Teresa Trull	The Ways a Woman Can Be	Olivia	LF 910	1977
"Woman-Loving Women"	<various artists>	Lesbian Concentrate	Olivia	LF 915	1977
"You In My Life"	Teresa Trull	Let it Be Known	Olivia	LF923	1980
"You In My Life"	<various artists>	Michigan Live '85	August Night	MF 010	1986
"You're My Home"	Teresa Trull	Let it Be Known	Olivia	LF923	1980

=== Guest appearance credits ===
Album title	Artist(s)	Record label	Stock number	Release year	Role
Face the Music	Meg Christian	Olivia	LF913	1977	background vocals/vocal support
Imagine My Surprise	Holly Near	Redwood	RR 401	1978	additional vocals
Shadows on a Dime	Ferron	Lucy Records/Redwood	LR004CD	1984	supporting vocals
Don't Doubt It	Deidre McCalla	Olivia	LF939	1985	background vocals
Trouble in Paradise	Romanovsky and Phillips	Fresh Fruit	FF 102	1985, reissued 2009	background vocals/drum machine programming
Lucie Blue Tremblay	Lucie Blue Tremblay	Olivia	ORCD947	1986	background vocals
Deuce	Deuce	Redwood	RR 8602	1986	lead vocal on song "Love Stings"
Harmony	Hunter Davis	Redwood	RR8601	1986	background vocals
Bonnie Hayes	Bonnie Hayes	Chrysalis	VK 41609	1987	background vocals
With a Little Luck	Deidre McCalla	Olivia	LF953	1987	background vocals/lead vocals
Understated	The Washington Sisters	SHSAWA Music	SHSA221CD	1987	supporting vocals/hand claps
Torn	Hunter Davis	Redwood	RR8803	1988	supporting vocals
Time Turns the Moon	Tret Fure	Second Wave	CD 22015	1990	background vocals
Take Two	The Washington Sisters	SHSAWA Music	SHSA222CD	1991	supporting vocals
Everyday Heroes and Heroines	Deidre McCalla	Olivia	ORCD965	1992	supporting vocals
Transformations	Lucie Blue Tremblay	Olivia	ORCD967	1992	background vocals
Love, Kristina	Kristina Olsen	Philo	CDPH-1157	1993	background vocals
JustBecause	Mary Paulson	Palmay Music	CD1-95	1995	background vocals
Between the Covers	Cris Williamson and Tret Fure	Wolf Moon/Goldenrod Records	65401	1996	background vocals
Trackers of Time	Karen Almquist	Althia	1004	1996	background vocals
Radio Quiet	Cris Williamson and Tret Fure	Wolf Moon/Goldenrod Records	65402	1998	background vocals
Ready to Fly	Calaveras	Fennel & Mustard Records	<unknown>	1998	background vocals
Inside Out: The IMA Sessions	Ferron	Institute for the Musical Arts	IMA0001	1999	background vocals
Ashes	Cris Williamson	Wolf Moon	5403	2001	background vocals
Replay	Cris Williamson	Wolf Moon	65404	2003	background vocals
Playing for Keeps	Deidre McCalla	Maidenrock	3050	2003	supporting vocals
Real Deal	Cris Williamson	Wolf Moon	WMR65406	2005	background vocals
Sleep City	Vicki Randle	Wolf Moon	WMR65410	2006	background vocals
Fringe	Cris Williamson	Wolf Moon	WMR96457	2007	background vocals
Alive in Berkeley	Barbara Higbie	Slowbaby Music	2220	2007	vocals/guitar

== Films ==
- Olivia Records 15th Anniversary Concert Highlights (Wolfe Video, 1988, VHS tape)
- The Changer: A Record of the Times (Wolf Moon Records, 1991, VHS tape; DVD reissue 2005); Trull briefly appears in performance footage
- Radical Harmonies (Woman Vision, 2002, DVD); includes a brief interview with Trull and some Trull performance footage
