= Vicki Randle =

American musician, singer and composer

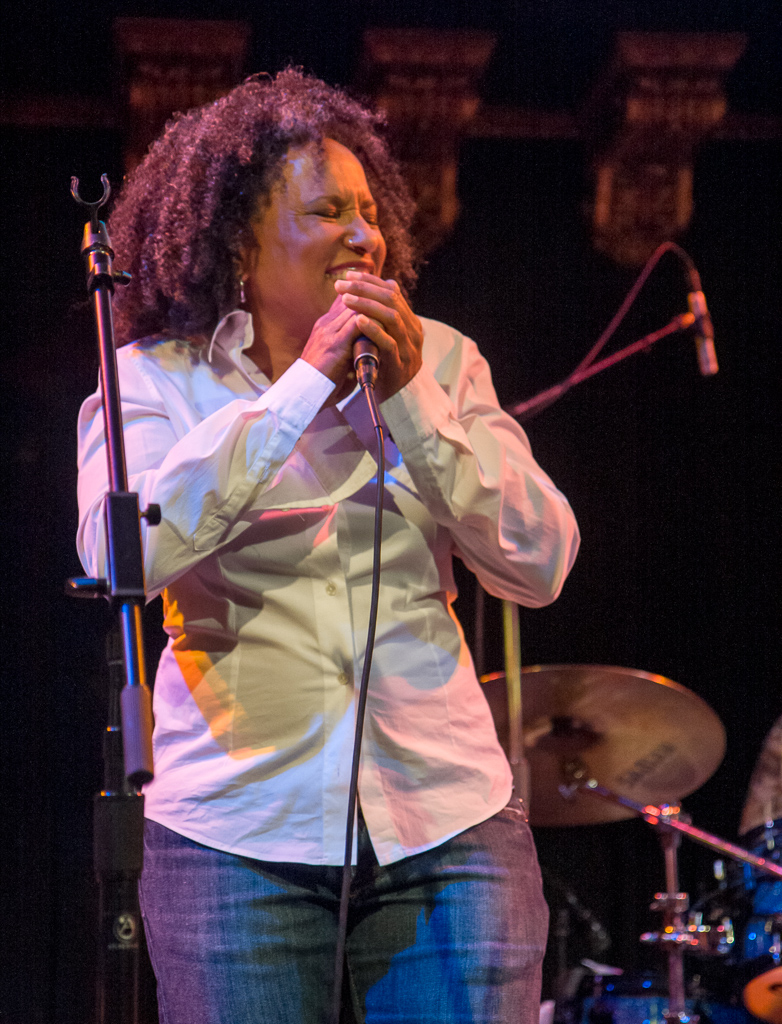
- Randle performing in 2008

Background information
- Born: December 11, 1954 (age 71); San Francisco, California, U.S.
- Genres: Jazz, rock
- Occupations: Singer, musician
- Instruments: Vocals, guitar, percussion, bass
- Website: VickiRandle.com

Vicki Randle (born December 11, 1954) is an American singer, multi-instrumentalist (primarily acoustic guitar, bass and percussion) and composer, known as the first permanent female member of The Tonight Show Band, starting with host Jay Leno in 1992. She is also known for touring and recording with Aretha Franklin, Celine Dion, Lionel Richie, and Kenny Loggins.

== Career ==
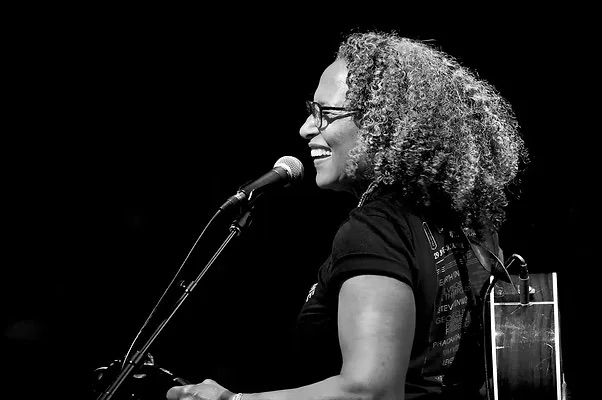
Randle in 2019

Randle was born in San Francisco, California. She began her career as a singer-songwriter/guitarist, playing in such venues as the Bla-Bla Cafe, McCabe's and The Ice House. She also recorded and toured with several women's music artists, such as Cris Williamson, Ferron, June Millington and Linda Tillery.

She has recorded and/or toured with Aretha Franklin, Mavis Staples, George Benson, Lionel Richie, Kenny Loggins, Celine Dion, Herbie Hancock, Wayne Shorter, Branford Marsalis, Jeffrey Osborne, Laura Nyro and Lyle Mays. She appeared in the HBO documentary Mavis!.

Randle became the first female permanent member of the Tonight Show Band with Branford Marsalis, starting in May 1992 and continuing through May 2009. She continued her association with Jay Leno under his five-nights-a-week primetime The Jay Leno Show on NBC as a musician with Kevin Eubanks' renamed "Primetime Band". The show premiered September 14, 2009. She returned to The Tonight Show with Jay Leno with the primetime show's cancellation on February 9, 2010, and continued until May 2010.

In 2006, Randle released her first solo album titled Sleep City: Lullabies for Insomniacs. The album was produced by Bonnie Hayes and included Hayes, Cris Williamson Nina Gerber, Barbara Higbie, Teresa Trull, Linda Tillery, Freddie Washington, Herman Matthews, Stephen Bruton with a track produced by Val Garay.

She is part of the predominantly black all-female rock band Skip The Needle as bassist, percussionist, co-lead singer and composer. The band consists of Randle, Shelley Doty, Kofy Brown and Katie Cash.

In 2022, Randle joined Greg Loiacono's band as percussionist and vocalist, and will be touring on bass with the MC5 led by guitarist Wayne Kramer and featuring singer Brad Brooks, guitarist Stevie Salas and drummer Winston Watson.

== Personal life ==
Randle is openly lesbian. She has residences in Venice Beach and Oakland, California.
