= Linda Shear =

American singer-songwriter (born 1948)

- Born: 1948 (age 77–78); Chicago, Illinois, U.S.
- Genres: Women's music; Folk
- Occupations: Singer-songwriter; guitarist; pianist
- Instruments: Vocals; guitar; piano
- Years active: 1972–present
- Label: Old Lady Blue Jeans
- Spouse: windflower Townley (m. 2008)

Linda Shear (born 1948 in Chicago, Illinois) is an American singer-songwriter, guitarist, and piano player.

== Musical career ==
On May 13, 1972, she and percussionist Ella Szekely performed in the first known out-lesbian concert in the U.S. at the University of Illinois, Chicago Circle Campus. The Chicago Women's Liberation Rock Band was also on the bill that evening. Soon after, Shear began performing with her band, Family of Woman, which included Szekely, violinist Joan Capra, and guitar players Sherry Jenkins, Judy Handler, and Susan Abod. Susan Kahn served as their sound technician, and they played nationally as the first known out lesbian band in the country, including at the second National Lesbian Conference at the University of California, Berkeley in 1973.

Following the dissolution of Family of Woman, Shear began touring and released her album A Lesbian Portrait on her own independent record label, Old Lady Blue Jeans, in 1976. Elana Dykewomon reviewed the album positively in DYKE, A Quarterly. She performed in concert and at women's music festivals, including the Michigan Womyn's Music Festival. She was a supporter of lesbian separatism, and in 1976 began requesting that her audiences be limited to lesbians only. In the early 1970s, Shear helped found the Chicago-based lesbian newspaper, Lavender Woman.

Although Shear had little commercial success, she remains an icon in some lesbian circles. Her music and story were featured by JD Doyle in 2001. She was interviewed in the 2002 documentary Radical Harmonies, and she appeared on the breast cancer research benefit CD High Risk. In 2010, she was interviewed by Tracy Baim for her project, Chicago Gay History.

== Personal life ==
In 1974, Shear moved to Northampton, Massachusetts with her former partner Tryna Goldsmith. In 1975, they were involved in a custody battle for Tryna's eleven-year-old daughter, which they ultimately lost.

On September 28, 2008, after 25 years of domestic partnership, Shear married windflower Townley. After living in Northern California for 31 years, in 2024, Linda and windflower moved back to Western Massachusetts with their two dogs, Emma Rose and Skylar Grace.
