= The Lives We Lead =

- Directed by: Davo Hardy
- Written by: Davo Hardy in collaboration with Sally Williams and Georgina Neville.
- Produced by: Davo Hardy
- Starring: Sally Williams; Georgina Neville; Davo Hardy; Josh Wiseman
- Cinematography: Rob Greaves
- Edited by: Davo Hardy
- Music by: Holly Near; Debby Schwartz; Tish Hinojosa
- Production companies: Davo Hardy Productions; McFarlane Production and Design
- Distributed by: www.davohardyfilms.com
- Release date: 13 October 2015
- Running time: 115 minutes
- Country: Australia
- Language: English

The Lives We Lead is an Australian 2015 drama film directed by Davo Hardy in his feature film directorial debut. It stars Sally Williams, Georgina Neville, Davo Hardy and Josh Wiseman.

The plot deals with four characters, as seen over the course of fifty years and through various turns of fortune as they each deal with the attitudes and expectations imposed on them in childhood. Pamela (Williams) and Edith (Neville) are two upper-middle-class sisters, but their widowed father overtly favors one over the other. Gavin (Wiseman) comes from a privileged family, but lacks affection and belonging. And Kerrod (Hardy) is from a working-class family and is the youngest of three, who aspires to provide better for his family than his own father did.

The film was well-received by critics and the general public upon its premiere at the Ritz Cinema, Sydney Australia on 2 August 2015, and its DVD release on 13 October 2015, with worldwide distribution via TLA Releasing. It was included in the Australian database of films OzFlix as of April 2017. Amazon re-released the DVD in September 2019.

== Plot ==
Chronicles the lives of four friends, whose lives are consumed by the unfair attitudes and values imposed upon them as children. The Lives We Lead spans over 50 years, following these distinct characters from childhood to old age, as they grapple with the effects of their very different attitudes towards life, love and fulfillment as circumstance and the actions of others influence their decisions and shape their futures.

The film opens with the assembly of a photo album and transitions to a playground and introduces the characters as children, each developing their personalities amid their strained family dynamics.

Pamela and Edith are two competitive sisters who enjoy taunting each other. Their widower father dotes on Pamela for her confidence and extroverted personality, often shaming Edith for being more introverted and studious. This results in Pamela developing a narcissistic Cinderella complex, while Edith rebels amid strong feelings of inadequacy.

Gavin, the new kid, comes from a very well-to-do family and is amply provided for, but his parents communicate through barbed passive aggression and all but overlook Gavin, their only child. He is to be seen, not heard. Later when his homosexuality is established and his mother runs off to seek her own happiness, Gavin's father rejects him as the greatest disappointment he has ever known, citing his friends the root of Gavin's outspoken need for belonging.

Kerrod, another local boy, is the third of three boys from a working-class family, living adjacent to Pamela and Edith. He is taught to be a provider and a hardworking tradesman.

Upon graduating high school, Pamela and Kerrod are shown to be dating. She is pursuing acting and he has an electrician apprenticeship. 16-year-old Edith has become a rebellious aspiring writer, possessing a distinctly bitter world view, while Gavin is shown attending a gay social event at which he meets Michael, a talent agent.

Gavin and Edith make a pact to be one another's companion safety net, should they be unlucky in love. Edith rejects Gavin's suggestion of someday seeking IVF together; refusing to sacrifice her dream career for family or the needs of others.

Coincidentally, Kerrod and Pamela unexpectedly fall pregnant. The fierce backlash is quickly overshadowed by the sudden death of Kerrod's father, closely followed by their shotgun wedding. Pamela visits a palm reader who points out that she does not appear to have a life purpose. Pamela storms away, infuriated.

Gavin's relationship with Michael turns sour and he stays with Kerrod and Pamela, who is struggling with postpartum depression. Edith's writing career takes off, freeing her from the obligation to her father and the rest of her family. Gavin and Pamela both attend a spiritual retreat, from which they both return to their former lives with a stronger sense of self. Pamela cites time being the main struggle in her life and resolves to live her life to the fullest while she is still young; Gavin cites men as his greatest weakness and promptly returns to Michael for one more try at their relationship.

Two years later, at the birthday party of Kerrod and Pamela's son, Gavin drunkenly kisses them both and Edith defuses the situation by taking him to a private room in the house. Overwhelmed by a sudden rush of inadequacy and jealousy, Edith sexually assaults Gavin and falls pregnant to him.

In a moment of deja vu, the news of Edith's pregnancy coincides with the death of her own father. Stranger still, Pamela also announces she is expecting again. Gavin attempts to mend ties with his father, but is rejected once more. Edith, conflicted with exactly why she wants to have child in the first place, has a chance meeting with a respected publisher and is given a great career opportunity. Her subsequent decision to have an abortion effectively breaks Gavin's heart and their friendship is terminated.

Six years later, Pamela's sense of purpose has begun to wane in the shadow of Edith's success and her marriage to Kerrod begins to fracture under the stress of parenthood. Through a montage, seen primarily from Pamela's point of view, the extent of their financial difficulties is made apparent, as is Pamela's shame at not achieving with her life as she had wanted, made worse still by Edith's ability to lift the family out of debt.

On their 15th anniversary, Kerrod shoves Pamela during another quarrel. Overcome with guilt, Kerrod retreats to Gavin's house. He is distressed and inebriated upon arrival and Michael encourages Kerrod to pursue his own happiness but also indecently assaults him. Kerrod violently defends himself and Gavin breaks up with Michael and leaves with Kerrod.

Struggling with her marriage breakdown, Pamela indulges in some casual sexual encounters before the next leap in time.

Over the next 20 years, Kerrod raises his sons on a country property far away from Pamela. Gavin was there with him for a while but eventually found a new outlet for his acting career, which becomes wildly successful and he moves to the United Kingdom. He is seen calling his father to postpone some social plans, but mentions his new partner and his appreciation at how his parents are working out their differences. Gavin's parents are then seen, well into their 80s or 90s, tenderly holding hands.

Kerrod suffers a heart attack and his acute condition reunites Pamela, who is now a B-grade thespian and cabaret performer, with Edith, a successful best-selling author. Gavin is unable to make it back to Kerrod before he dies, but both Pamela and Edith are able to bury the hatchet with each other at his funeral. They agree that their naivete and sibling rivalry were the root of their poor life choices but also that there is ultimately nothing to forgive. Edith graciously soothes Pamela's bitterness over the sense that her life is without purpose, explaining that this means she can do whatever she wants with her life. She speaks philosophically about wisdom and regrets and the two feuding sisters are able to find peace together.

Many years later, Gavin and Edith have passed away and Pamela reflects on her long and family-oriented life. She sits alone and wistful, closing a photo album and shedding a tear, before we dissolve to a view of the playground at sunset and a clock pointing sharply at 12.

== Cast ==
- Sally Williams - Pamela Keegan
- Georgina Neville - Edith Keegan
- Josh Wiseman - Gavin O'Neill
- Davo Hardy - Kerrod Doyle
- Christopher Price - Michael Fielding
- Bridget Williams - Young Pamela
- Sage Amethyst Matchett - Young Edith
- Alexei Zotos - Young Gavin
- Henry D'Bras - Young Kerrod
- Glenn Groves - Murray Keegan
- Matthew R. Grego - Phillip O'Neill
- Sonya Kerr - Simone O'Neill
- Caroline McQuade - Chantelle Doyle
- Scott Murphy - Ryan Doyle
- Andrew Spencer - Jacob Doyle
- Robert McFarlane - Samuel Whittaker
- Tim Mason Scott - Jace Pascal
- Peita Breese - Alexis
- Kathryn Yuen - Celebrant
- Brett Garland - Leo

== Reception ==
Though well-received, the film did meet with criticism for its somber tone and melodramatic plot, cited also for its theatrical exposition-laced dialogue and inner-monologue "faux-interview" scenes.
