= Margie Adam =

American musician and composer

- Born: 1947 (age 78–79); Lompoc, California, U.S.
- Occupations: Musician; composer
- Website: www.margieadam.com

Margie Adam (born 1947) is an American musician and composer.

== Early life and education ==
Margie Adam was born in 1947 in Lompoc, California. Her father was a newspaper publisher who composed music on the side, and her mother was a classical pianist. Adam began playing the piano as a child. Adam graduated from the University of California, Berkeley in 1971.

In 1973, while attending the Sacramento Women's Music Festival, she performed during the open mic session and began her career as a professional musician. The following year, the first National Women's Music Festival was held in Champaign-Urbana, Illinois. Adam co-headlined the festival, alongside Meg Christian and Cris Williamson. That conference is credited as helping to form the Women's music movement, with Adam at the forefront.

== Music career ==
Her first album, Margie Adam, was promoted with a 50-city tour which concluded with a performance of her song, "We Shall Go Forth" at the National Women's Conference in Houston. The song quickly became an anthem for the lesbian feminist movement and is now part of the Political History archives in the Smithsonian Museum. In 1978, she became an associate of the Women's Institute for Freedom of the Press (WIFP). WIFP is an American nonprofit publishing organization. The organization works to increase communication between women and connect the public with forms of women-based media. Adam During the early 1980s, Adam performed at various concerts and fundraisers for feminist candidates and causes, including representatives for the Equal Rights Amendment, for whom she traveled on a 20-city tour.

Adam composed "Best Friend (The Unicorn Song)", which was later covered by Peter, Paul and Mary. A Cantonese version of the song was also released by Hong Kong singer George Lam in 1984. From 1975 to 1984, Adam worked with manager and music producer Barbara Price, promoting women's music and releasing her own albums on Pleiades Records. Adam challenged conventional management practices by having all-women crews during her performances and tours. After being on a "radical sabbatical," since 1984, Adam returned to writing music in 1991 and went on a national tour in 1992 to support her new album, Another Place. In 1996 she embarked on the Three of Hearts tour with fellow pianists Liz Story and Barbara Higbie. In 1998, she conducted a tour to raise awareness of the service feminist bookstores made to the women's community.

Margie Adam continues to compose and perform at various venues across the U.S. and Canada. More recent work includes The Best of Margie Adam (1990), Avalon (2001), and Portal 2005.

== See also ==
- Women's music
