= Maxine Feldman =

American folk musician and singer-songwriter

- Born: December 26, 1945; Brooklyn, New York City, U.S.
- Died: August 17, 2007 (aged 61); Albuquerque, New Mexico, U.S.
- Education: El Camino College
- Occupations: Singer-songwriter, comedian
- Known for: Contemporary folk Women's music

Maxine "Max" Adele Feldman (December 26, 1945 – August 17, 2007) was an American folk singer-songwriter, comedian and pioneer of women's music. Feldman's song "Angry Atthis," first performed in May 1969 and first recorded in 1972, is considered the first openly distributed out lesbian song of what would become the women's music movement. Feldman identified as a "big loud Jewish butch lesbian."

In later years, Feldman embraced a gender-fluid identity, according to partner Helen Thornton. Thornton described her partner's identity as "both/and" rather than "either/or." Feldman had been comfortable with either gender label and wore men's clothing on stage.

== Early life ==
Feldman was born on December 26, 1945, in Brooklyn, New York. As a child, Feldman had a stutter and requested lessons in acting. Feldman had a bit part as a Girl Scout Brownie on The Goldbergs in 1956. As a student at the High School of Performing Arts, Feldman performed in children's theater productions.

Feldman attended Emerson College in Boston to study theater arts. After being kicked out for being a lesbian, Feldman was sent to psychiatric treatment and refused the electroshock treatment used at the time. In 1963, Feldman began performing on the vibrant Boston music circuit, at Beacon Hill and Cambridge coffeehouses such as the Turk's Head, the Orleans and the Loft. At one point, Feldman introduced a then-unknown José Feliciano. Openly lesbian, Feldman was described as attracting "the wrong crowd" by a local DJ.

In 1968, Feldman moved to Manhattan and then to Los Angeles. Feldman attended El Camino College in Los Angeles County and helped to found the campus women's center.

== Career ==
"Angry Atthis," of course, is a play on words. I was "angry at this" lesbian oppression. My brainy girl side wanted to call my piece "Sappho's Song," but then I read that Atthis was the name of one of Sappho's lovers. And "Atthis" began to appear to me as a better statement of all I felt. The song just spewed out of me.

— Maxine Feldman

Feldman wrote the consciousness raising song "Angry Atthis" on May 13, 1969, prior to the Stonewall Riots. The debut of the song in Los Angeles has been credited as the first performance of an openly lesbian song.

In 1970–1971, Feldman met the feminist comedy duo Harrison and Tyler, who had come to perform at the college. After hearing the performance of "Angry Atthis," Patty Harrison and Robin Tyler invited Feldman to open for them during their tour of the United States. Feldman joined Harrison and Tyler, performing for colleges and once at a state penitentiary, the California Institute for Women. After Feldman was introduced as a lesbian performer during one show at Ventura College, the stage manager insisted on informing the audience that Feldman had not been invited by the college.

A record of "Angry Atthis" was recorded and produced by Harrison & Tyler Productions in January 1972.

Feldman worked off and on at The Back Room for Alice M. Brock, a friend. Other venues included the Village Gate and the Other End, in New York City, and the Ash Grove in Los Angeles.

In 1974, Feldman shared the stage at the Town Hall in Manhattan with Yoko Ono. Variety magazine described the performance as a "smashing success," and said Feldman "proved an impressive spokesman for lesbians with her voice, tunes, interpretation and sense of humor." The conservative National Review magazine, which also covered the show, described Feldman as "Jonathan Winters in drag," which Feldman took as a compliment. The columnist for National Review wrote: "Maxine exits to her personal refrain, 'No longer afraid to be the big word, letter L, Lesbian.'"

Under police protection from Ku Klux Klan protesters, Feldman performed comedy at the 1977 National Women's Conference in Houston, Texas. Feldman later said of the event, "There were three hundred KKK in the audience carrying placards that read, 'Kill all dykes, kikes, commies, and abortionists,' and I was three out of four."

Openly Jewish, Feldman decried antisemitism in the women's movement:

As a kid, I was the only Jew on my block to keep my own nose, and in the Movement's early days, I was the only one to keep my own name. Women were changing their names if they had a 'man' ending. They said it was to deny the patriarchy, but they were also denying their Jewish identities. Feldman is a Jewish name, not a male name. When they asked why I didn't change it, I answered, 'Why don't Margie Adam and Cris Williamson change theirs?'

Feldman performed at the first Michigan Womyn's Music Festival in 1976 and returned to the festival 14 times. Feldman's womyn's anthem, "Amazon," was traditionally performed during the opening festivities of the festival. In 1986, Feldman gave the Michigan Womyn's Music Festival the rights to the song.

Feldman recorded the record album Closet Sale in 1979. The album included the songs "White Mountain Mama," "Holbrook," "Amazon," "Closet Sale," "Angry Atthis," "Everywoman," "Bottom Line," "Objectification" and "Bar One."

Feldman's music was featured in Jan Oxenberg's 1975 film about lesbian stereotypes, A Comedy in Six Unnatural Acts.

== Death ==
Feldman, who did not have health insurance, became ill in 1994 and died on August 17, 2007, in Albuquerque, New Mexico at the age of 61.

== Legacy ==
Feldman was recognized as one of the founders of women's music in Dee Mosbacher's 2002 documentary film, Radical Harmonies.

In 2011, the album Amazon 35 was released in Feldman's honor, on the 35th anniversary of the song "Amazon". The album features the original song, along with reggae, dub, salsa and acoustic versions.
