= Deidre McCalla =

American singer-songwriter

- Origin: New York City, NY
- Occupations: Singer, songwriter
- Labels: Olivia Records, Roulette Records

Deidre McCalla is an American singer-songwriter from New York City. McCalla was raised around the folk music scene of Macdougal Street in New York, where she began her career. In 1983, she moved to northern California. She has released several albums on the women's music label Olivia Records.

She has worked with Teresa Trull, Mike Marshall, Linda Tillery, Bonnie Hayes, and other musicians. She has stated that she is a lesbian.

== Discography ==
- Fur Coats & Blue Jeans (Roulette Records, 1973)
- Don't Doubt It (Olivia Records, 1985)
- With a Little Luck (Olivia, 1987)
- Everyday Heroes & Heroines (Olivia, 1992)
- Playing for Keeps (MaidenRock, 2003)
- Endless Grace (MaidenRock 2023)
