= Bonnie J. Morris =

American scholar of women's studies (born 1961)

- Born: May 14, 1961; Los Angeles, California
- Known for: Research on the feminist movement, women's music, lesbian erasure, and women in Chabad Judaism
- Awards: Lambda Literary Award (finalist); Over the Rainbow Book List (American Library Association)

Academic background
- Education: Binghamton University (PhD)
- Alma mater: Binghamton University

Academic work
- Discipline: Women's studies
- Institutions: Georgetown University; George Washington University; University of California, Berkeley
- Notable works: Eden Built By Eves: The Culture of Women's Music Festivals; Girl Reel; Revenge of the Women's Studies Professor; The Disappearing L: Erasure of Lesbian Spaces and Culture

Bonnie J. Morris (born May 14, 1961; Los Angeles, California) is an American scholar of women's studies. She completed a PhD in women's history at Binghamton University in 1989 and has taught at various universities including Georgetown University, George Washington University, and University of California, Berkeley.

Morris has published research on various subjects, including the feminist movement, women in Chabad Judaism, the history of women's music, and lesbian erasure. In 2017, her archival collection of the women's music movement was exhibited at the Library of Congress, where Morris also presented the lecture "The Sounds of Feminist Revolution". She is a three-time Lambda Literary Award finalist (Eden Built By Eves: The Culture of Women's Music Festivals, Girl Reel, Revenge of the Women's Studies Professor), and winner of two national first-prize chapbooks (The Schoolgirl's Atlas, Sixes and Sevens). In 2018, The Disappearing L: Erasure of Lesbian Spaces and Culture was named an Over the Rainbow nonfiction selection by the American Library Association.

== Works ==
=== Scholarly ===
- Morris, Bonnie J. (1997). The High School Scene in the Fifties: Voices from West L.A. Westport, Connecticut: Bergin & Garvey. ISBN 978-0897894944.
- Morris, Bonnie J. (1998). Lubavitcher Women in America: Identity and Activism in the Postwar Era (1st ed.). Albany, New York: State University of New York Press. ISBN 978-0791437995.
- Morris, Bonnie J. (1999). Eden Built By Eves: The Culture of Women's Music Festivals (1st ed.). Los Angeles, California: Alyson Publications. ISBN 1-55583-477-9. LCCN 98054780.
- Morris, Bonnie J. (2012). Women's History For Beginners. Danbury, Connecticut: For Beginners. ISBN 978-1934389607.
- Morris, Bonnie J. (2016). The Disappearing L: Erasure of Lesbian Spaces and Culture (1st ed.). Albany, New York: State University of New York Press. ISBN 978-1-4384-6177-9. LCCN 2016011561.
- Morris, Bonnie J.; Withers, D-M (2018). The Feminist Revolution: The Struggle for Women's Liberation. Smithsonian Books. ISBN 978-1588346124.

=== Other books ===
- Morris, Bonnie J. (2000). Girl Reel. Minneapolis, Minnesota: Coffee House Press. ISBN 978-1566890946.
- Morris, Bonnie J. (2001). The Question of Sabotage: A Festival Fable. Tallahassee, Florida: Bella Books. ISBN 978-0967775388.
- Morris, Bonnie J.; Casey, E. B. (2005). 52 Pickup. Tallahassee, Florida: Bella Books. ISBN 978-1594930263.
- Morris, Bonnie J. (2009). Revenge of the Women's Studies Professor. Bloomington, Indiana: Indiana University Press. ISBN 978-0253220622.
- Morris, Bonnie J. (2013). The Schoolgirl's Atlas. Georgetown, Kentucky: Finishing Line Press. ISBN 978-1622293636.
- Morris, Bonnie J. (2014). Sixes and Sevens.
- Morris, Bonnie J. (2017). Sappho's Bar and Grill. Ann Arbor, Michigan: Bywater Books. ISBN 978-1612940977.
- Morris, Bonnie J. (2018). Sappho's Overhead Projector. Ann Arbor, Michigan: Bywater Books. ISBN 978-1612941394.

=== Miscellaneous ===
- Soundwaves of Feminism: The Women's Music Movement (Library of Congress, 2017)

== See also ==
- List of feminists
