= Barbara Higbie =

American musician, singer, and songwriter (born 1958)

- Born: 1958 (age 67–68); Michigan, U.S.
- Genres: Folk; jazz; pop; fusion
- Occupations: Musician; songwriter
- Instruments: Piano; violin; vocals
- Years active: 1980s–present
- Labels: Windham Hill; Olivia; Second Wave; Slowbaby
- Member of: Windham Hill Winter Solstice
- Formerly of: Montreux
- Education: Mills College; Sorbonne University
- Website: barbarahigbie.com

Barbara Higbie (born 1958) is an American Grammy-nominated, Bammies Award–winning pianist, composer, violinist, singer-songwriter, and multi-instrumentalist. She has played on over 100 CDs, including songs with Carlos Santana and Bonnie Raitt. The first female instrumentalist signed to Windham Hill Records, she also recorded solo or duo projects for the Olivia, Second Wave, and Slowbaby labels. Higbie is a folk, jazz, pop, and fusion singer-songwriter noted for her highly melodic jazz/folk performances. She has toured nationally and internationally since the early 1980s and has performed with Bonnie Raitt, Terry Riley, Pete Seeger, the Kronos Quartet, Jaron Lanier, Cris Williamson, Holly Near, Teresa Trull, and Ferron.

== Early life and education ==
Born in Michigan and raised in Indiana, she spent several years as a teenager in Ghana with her family, while her father, Nathan B. Higbie III, helped establish the successful nonprofit TechnoServe. She also worked one summer in Honduras, Central America as a medical volunteer with the nonprofit Amigos de Las Américas. Graduating Phi Beta Kappa from Mills College, she the attended Sorbonne University in Paris and was awarded a Thomas J. Watson Fellowship to study traditional music in West Africa.

== Career ==
In Paris, Higbie met Darol Anger, with whom she began a fruitful musical collaboration. Together they recorded the album Tideline (1982), one of the early successful records of Windham Hill.

In 1984, she co-lead a group for a live album recording at the Montreux Jazz Festival, which then became the successful group Montreux, with Darol Anger, Mike Marshall, Todd Phillips, Andy Narrell, and Michael Manring. She recorded a critically acclaimed album titled Unexpected with singer Teresa Trull in 1983, which was included in The Boston Globe's Guide to Best Albums of 1983. Higbie and Trull collaborated again on the 1998 release Playtime. Since 1990, Higbie has released a number of solo albums on the Windham Hill and Slowbaby labels. Her first solo album, 1990's Signs of Life (Windham Hill) was named one of the top ten albums of 1990 by The Washington Post. She is known as a versatile and soulful musician.

Higbie maintains an active touring schedule, both as a solo artist and as a member of the Windham Hill Winter Solstice ensemble. She has performed on all seven continents and in all 50 states. As of 2019, Higbie is co-chair of the nonprofit Board of the Society for the Preservation of Traditional Music (Freight and Salvage) in Berkeley, California. She has served on the board of the Freight on and off since 2005.

== Personal life ==
Higbie resides in the San Francisco Bay Area with her family.

== Selected discography ==
Solo

- 1990: Signs of Life
- 1996: I Surrender
- 2001: Variations on a Happy Ending
- 2003: Barbara Higbie's Interpretation of Carole King
- 2005: Best Of (1982–2000)
- 2007: Alive in Berkeley
- 2014: Scenes from Life
- 2019: Resonance
- 2021: Murmuration

With Darol Anger

- 1982: Tideline
- 1984: Live at Montreux

With Teresa Trull

- 1983: Unexpected
- 1998: Playtime

With Montreux

- 1986: Sign Language
- 1988: Let Them Say
