= Lucie Blue Tremblay =

Canadian singer-songwriter

- Born: 1958 (age 67–68); Montreal, Quebec, Canada
- Genres: Folk
- Occupations: record company owner, singer-songwriter, music producer
- Instruments: Guitar, piano/keyboards, drums
- Website: www.luciebluetremblay.com

Lucie Blue Tremblay (born 1958 in Montreal) is a Canadian folk singer-songwriter.

Tremblay started performing when she was still a child, accompanying her mother's five-piece band as a drummer. Later, she taught herself how to play the guitar, followed by the piano. In 1984, she attended the Festival de la Chanson de Granby and received three awards: the "Singer-songwriter Award", the "Press Award", and the "Public Award". This propelled her onto the Quebec music scene and exposed her to a variety of radio and television media. She continued to appear on Canadian television and CBC radio for the years that followed. Her first appearance in the United States was at the 1985 Michigan Womyn's Music Festival's Day stage singing a duet with another Canadian singer-songwriter, Ferron. Her debut album, released in 1986 by Olivia Records, was voted Top Ten Album of the Year by the Boston Globe.

The "Frank-Tremblay Safe College Scholarship", named for Tremblay and openly gay Congressman Barney Frank, was created at Bridgewater State College in Bridgewater, Massachusetts.

From 2005 through 2010, Tremblay worked in collaboration with Lavender Visions Productions and P.O.P. Productions to promote breast health education in the US and Canada. After travelling over 92,000 miles in a motor coach pulling the Breast Cancer Motorcycle (built on the Discovery Channel), Tremblay produced an educational music video on how to do breast self-examinations.

== Discography ==
- Lucie Blue Tremblay (1986)
- Tendresse (1992)
- Transformations (1993)
- I'm Ready (1998)
- Because of You (2001)
- It's Got to Be About Love (2004)
- Changes (The Breast Exam Project 2011)
- When I Was A Puppy (2015)
- Counting My Blessings (2017)
- So Many Wows (2023)

== See also ==
- Women's music
