= Tret Fure =

American singer-songwriter

- Genres: Folk-rock; Women's music
- Occupations: Singer-songwriter, sound engineer
- Instrument: Guitar
- Years active: 1968–present
- Website: http://www.tretfure.com

Tret Fure is an American singer-songwriter, prominent in the women's music and folk music scene.

The musical career of Tret Fure has spanned six decades. Fure began her career at the age of 16, singing in coffeehouses and campuses in the Midwest. At 19, she moved to Los Angeles in the hope of obtaining a record deal. Within a year she was performing as guitarist and vocalist for Spencer Davis, touring with him and penning the single for his album "Mousetrap". She went on to record her own album in 1973 on MCA/UNI Records. With the success of that release, she opened for such bands as Yes, Poco, and the J Geils Band.

Tret Fure has released 18 albums and CDs over the course of her 56 year career. In addition to being a songwriter, Fure has engineered and produced recordings by a variety of artists, as well as her own work.

In the early 1980s, Fure moved to the independent side of the industry discovering the blossoming genre known as Women's Music. She recorded with and produced some women's music including Meg & Cris at Carnegie Hall (1983). She worked as a duo with Cris Williamson throughout the 1990s, producing, engineering and releasing three CDs together.

Her solo releases include "Tret Fure" (1973), "Terminal Hold" (1984), "Edges of the Heart" (1986), "Time Turns the Moon" (1990), "Back Home" (2001), "My Shoes" (2003), "Anytime Anywhere" (2005) "True Compass" (2007), "The Horizon" (2010), "A Piece of the Sky" (2013), "Stone by Stone" (2021), and "Lavender Moonshine" (2023) "Rembrandt Afternoons" (2015), and "Roses in November" (2018) "Stone by Stone" (2021) and "Lavender Moonshine" (2023).

== Awards ==
2023 Tret was awarded the Phil Ochs Award in recognition of her music and her activism for social and political justice.

2022 - Finalist in the USA Songwriting Competition with Tret’s song, “Home You Go”.

2021 - #1 song “Roses in November” from the CD “Roses in November” (2018) for the month of November in the FAI FOLK CHART.

2021 - #14 Album for the year with “Stone by Stone”. #9 song for the year with “Monuments” and #25 artist of the year.

2021 - 2nd place winner in “A Still Small Voice 4U” songwriting competition with the song “Louder Than the Guns”.

2021 - #1 song “Monuments” from the CD “Stone by Stone” (2020) for the month of February in the FAI FOLK CHART.

2018 - #1 song ”Lessons From Home Plate” from the CD “Roses in November” (2018) for the month of June in the FAI FOLK CHART.

2020 - 1st place winner in “A Still Small Voice 4U” songwriting competition with her song “Monuments”.

2017 - 2nd place winner in the “Musicians United to Protect Bristol Bay” songwriting contest for her song "The Fishermen of Bristol Bay” (2015).

2015 - "Rembrandt Afternoons" (2015) was chosen by the acclaimed folk music show 'Midnight Special' as their album of the week.

2011 - Winner of the Women in the Arts “Phyllis Roark Memorial Award” for Philanthropy.

2009 - Winner of the Women in the Arts “Janine C Rae Award” for the Advancement of Women’s Culture.

2009 -Voted "Pride In The Arts” Favorite Female/Lesbian Musician.

2004 - Winner of the South Florida Folk Festival Singer/Songwriter Competition in 2 out of 3 categories, Best Overall and Best Up-Tempo Song.

2004 - Winner of the Women in the Arts “Jane Schliessman Award” for Outstanding Contributions to Women's Music.

1990 - Voted both Best Guitarist and Best Engineer in a Reader’s Choice poll in “Hot Wire: The Journal of Women’sMusic & Culture”.

== Discography ==
Tret Fure has recorded several albums, including:

- Mousetrap (1972, Spencer Davis album)
- Tret Fure (1973)
- Terminal Hold (1984)
- Edges of the Heart (1986)
- Time Turns the Moon (1990)
- Postcards from Paradise (1993, with Cris Williamson)
- Between the Covers (1999, with Cris Williamson)
- Radio Quiet (1999, with Cris Williamson)
- Back Home (2001)
- My Shoes (2002)
- Anytime Anywhere (2005)
- True Compass (2007)
- The Horizon (2010)
- A Piece of the Sky (2013)
- Rembrandt Afternoons (2015)
- Roses in November (2018)
- Stone By Stone (2020)
- Lavender Moonshine (2023)
