= Alix Dobkin =

American singer-songwriter and activist (1940–2021)

- Born: Alix Cecil Dobkin; August 16, 1940; New York City, New York, U.S.
- Died: May 19, 2021 (aged 80) Woodstock, New York, U.S.
- Genres: Folk, women's music
- Occupation: Singer-songwriter
- Instruments: Vocals, guitar
- Years active: 1973–2021
- Label: Women's Wax Works (Ladyslipper)

Alix Cecil Dobkin (August 16, 1940 – May 19, 2021) was an American folk singer-songwriter, memoirist, and lesbian feminist activist. In 1979, she was the first American lesbian feminist musician to do a European concert tour.

== Early life ==
Dobkin was born in New York City into a Jewish Communist family, named after her uncle Alix who died fighting against the fascists in the Spanish Civil War. She was raised in Philadelphia and Kansas City. Dobkin graduated from Germantown High School in 1958 and the Tyler School of Art with a Bachelor of Fine Arts degree in 1962.

== Career ==
Dobkin began her career by performing on the Greenwich Village coffeehouse scene in 1962. She played with greats like Bob Dylan and Buffy Sainte-Marie.

Starting in 1973, she released a number of albums as well as a songbook and toured throughout the U.S., Canada, England, Scotland, Ireland, Australia, and New Zealand promoting lesbian culture and community through women's music.

Dobkin and Kay Gardner founded the band Lavender Jane in the early 1970s. It was notable for being one of the first openly lesbian bands. They released Lavender Jane Loves Women, which was one of the first albums produced entirely by lesbians.

Dobkin enjoyed a small and devoted audience, has been called a "women's music legend" by Spin Magazine, "pithy" by The Village Voice, "Biting...inventive... imaginative" by New Age Journal, "uncompromising" in the New York Times Magazine, and "a troublemaker" by the FBI. She gained some unexpected fame in the 1980s when comedians such as David Letterman and Howard Stern tracked down her Lavender Jane Loves Women album, and began playing phrases from the song "View From Gay Head" on the air. By the 21st century, Dobkin had ceased writing and recording new material, but continued to tour until her death, stating she had "lost interest" and that writing her memoir had "sucked up all the creativity."

In 1977, she became an associate of the American nonprofit publishing organization Women's Institute for Freedom of the Press (WIFP). Dobkin was a member of the OLOC (Old Lesbians Organizing for Change) Steering Committee.

Her 2009 memoir, My Red Blood, was published by Alyson Books.

== Activism ==
Dobkin spoke about women-only spaces and protections for lesbian women. She was a vocal critic of the inclusion of trans women in women-only spaces. In one letter to the National Center for Lesbian Rights, she asserted, "For over twenty years men have declared themselves 'women,' manipulated their bodies and then demanded the feminist seal of approval from survivors of girlhood.... [My lyrics] are not 'oppressive' but refer to those of us who have a girlhood & a clitoris, & no one else." Her criticisms of postmodernism, sadomasochism, the transgender rights movement, and other movements appeared in several of her written columns, such as "Minstrel Blood." Her article "The Emperor's New Gender" appeared in the feminist journal off our backs in 2000.

== Personal life ==
In 1965 she married Sam Hood, who ran the Gaslight Cafe in Greenwich Village. They moved to Miami and opened The Gaslight South folk club, but moved back to New York in 1968. Their daughter Adrian was born two years later, and the following year the marriage broke up. A few months later, Dobkin came out as a lesbian, which was uncommon for a public personality to do at the time. She met partner Liza Cowan when performing on the latter's radio show in New York. The meeting was subsequently described as "love at first sight" and the two women came out as a couple and moved in together in 1971, residing with Dobkin's daughter Adrian.

Dobkin suffered a brain aneurysm on April 29, 2021, and was subsequently admitted to Westchester Medical Center. She was taken off life support on May 11 and discharged on May 17. She died at home surrounded by family on Wednesday, May 19, 2021. The cause of death was cited as a brain aneurysm and stroke. At the time of her death, Dobkin lived in Woodstock, New York. She is survived by her daughter Adrian, a brother and a sister, three grandchildren, and nieces and nephews. A memorial service was held for her in the summer of 2021.

== Discography ==
=== Albums ===
- Lavender Jane Loves Women (1973)
- Living with Lesbians (1975)
- Xx Alix (1980)
- These Women (1986)
- Yahoo Australia! Live from Sydney (1990)
- Love & Politics (compilation, 1992)
- Living with Lavender Jane (CD re-release of first two albums, 1998)

== Published works ==
- (Not Just A Songbook) (1978)
- Alix Dobkin's Adventures in Women's Music (1979)
- My Red Blood: A Memoir of Growing Up Communist, Coming Onto the Greenwich Village Folk Scene, and Coming Out in the Feminist Movement (2009)
