= Kristin Lems =

American musician, singer-songwriter

Kristin Lems is an American musician, singer-songwriter, feminist, and author/educator in the field of teaching English as a Second Language (ESL).

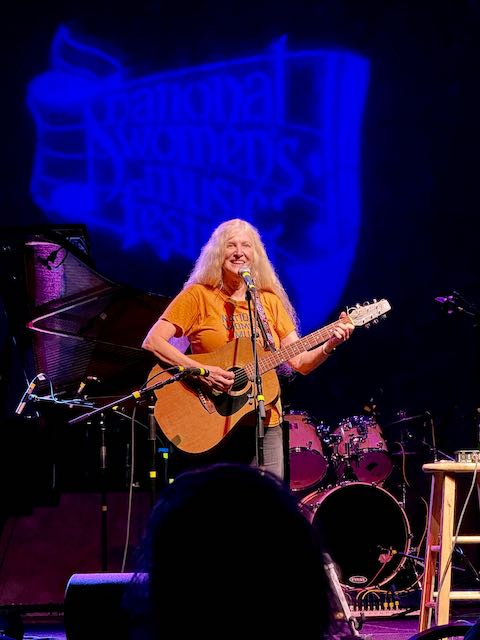
Lems in 2026

== Early life and education ==
Lems grew up in Evanston, Illinois and started singing at a young age. She has an A.B. from The University of Michigan (1972) and earned master's degrees in West Asian Studies (1975) and Teaching English as a Second Language (1983) from the University of Illinois Urbana-Champaign. She also earned a Doctorate of Education in Reading and Language from the National College of Education at National Louis University (2003). She spent time on a Fulbright fellowship training teachers in Algeria. In 1993, Lems joined the faculty of National Louis University, and as of 2022 she is a professor there.

== Biography ==
Lems' is known for her music and musical performances, for advocating for the Equal Rights Amendment, and for her work in the teaching of English as a second language.

Lems organized a local Womenfolk's Festival in Illinois that occurred on November 16, 1973. After that, she became lead organizer for the first National Women's Music Festival that was held on the campus of the University of Illinois in 1974. Lems founded the festival because she wanted to provide more opportunities for women to perform, and she was particularly motivated after attending a folk festival with no women artists. She continued as the lead organizer through 1978.

Lems has performed in concerts around the United States, and is primarily known for singing in support of the Equal Rights Amendment, most notably with her song the Ballad of the ERA. In 1978, she described her goal of bringing music both to people who are politically motivated and women in general.

== Selected works ==
- Lems, Kristin (2005). "Music Works: Music for Adult English Language Learners". New Directions for Adult and Continuing Education. 2005 (107): 13–21. doi:10.1002/ace.185. ISSN 1052-2891.
- Lems, Kristin (2010). Teaching reading to English language learners : insights from linguistics. Leah D. Miller, Tenena M. Soro. New York: Guilford Press. ISBN 978-1-60623-471-6. OCLC 551734926.
- Rasinski, Timothy V.; Blachowicz, Camille L. Z.; Lems, Kristin (2012). Fluency Instruction: Research-based Best Practices. Guilford Press. ISBN 978-1-4625-0441-1.
- Lems, Kristin (2018). "New Ideas for Teaching English Using Songs and Music". English Teaching Forum. 56 (1): 14–21. ISSN 1559-663X.
- "The Social Power of Music". Smithsonian Folkways Recordings. p. Ballad of the ERA.

== Awards and honors ==
Lems received the Humanist Heroine Award from the American Humanist Association in 1994. In 1996 the Freedom from Religion Foundation awarded her with their Freethought Heroine Award. In 2021, the Illinois Teachers of English to Speakers of Other Languages/Bilingual Education awarded Lems the Elliot Judd Outstanding Teacher Award.

== See also ==
- List of feminists
