= Meg Christian =

American folk musician (born 1946)

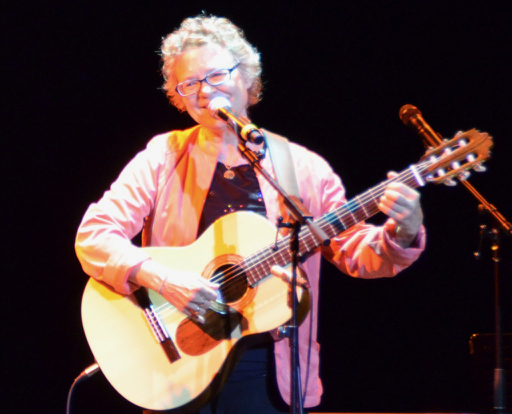
- Christian performing in January 2013

Background information
- Born: Lynchburg, Virginia, U.S.
- Genres: Folk
- Occupations: Singer-songwriter; musician
- Instruments: Vocals; guitar
- Years active: 1969–present
- Labels: Olivia; Syda

Meg Christian (born 1946 in Lynchburg, Virginia) is an American folk singer associated with the women's music movement.

== Early life and career ==
Christian was born in Tennessee in 1946 and raised in Lynchburg, Virginia. She has spoken about being an only child, learning stringed instruments while spending a lot of time alone and later being influenced by Joan Baez, The Kingston Trio and Harry Belafonte to organize folk groups in the '60s. Christian graduated from the University of North Carolina with a double degree in English and music.

She moved to Washington, D.C. in 1969, where she performed in bars covering easy listening material by artists such as Joni Mitchell and Burt Bacharach. Christian has said that her "entrance to sexual politics" began after witnessing the way David Frost showed little respect for two women authors Ti-Grace Atkinson and Robin Morgan,, during an interview. She then began writing material from an explicitly political and feminist perspective. For a time in the 1970s, Christian, who is openly lesbian, embraced women's separatism and sometimes played at women-only venues. She has acknowledged that the "feminist tag...makes women's music seem limited in appeal" but that the common denominator is that "we all make music out of a consciousness of being a woman...some of us would rather play only to an audience of women...some want to play to the universe."

Christian was one of the performers at the second Boston Women's Music Festival in 1977 and agreed with Holly Near, that the purpose of their music was to make women more aware of political issues. She explained how discovering the gay and women's movement in 1969 had resulted in her writing new material, noting "I couldn't believe what was coming out of my mouth...[and]...I started trying to find songs that said something to women."

== Olivia Records ==
Christian, along with other feminist and lesbian activists founded Olivia Records in 1973. The label began by releasing a single of Christian's version of the Gerry Goffin/Carole King song Lady, and the first LP was Christian's debut album, I Know You Know in 1974. A reviewer said [that] "the album's core is found in its romantic woman-to-woman folk-pop ballads, such as Christian's own Valentine Song...[and]...the arrangements, generally keyed to Christian's classical or steel-string guitar, are very much in the singer/songwriter style of James Taylor and Joni Mitchell. Christian's second album Face the Music (1977) was said in one review to reflect [the conflict] "between the value of the music-as-message and the music's value regardless of what it is about lyrically", while in another, as being "worth the attention of anyone interested in women's music and an absolute must for Meg Christian fans. Christian has said that the songs on her third album Turning it Over released in 1981, "had gone places that she had never imagined they would go musically and they are so beautiful that they made me cry." The Washington Post noted of Turning it Over, that "every major performer in women's music (Cris Williamson, Mary Watkins, Teresa Trull, Margie Adam) appeared as a musician or backup singer...[and]...it was a sign of love and respect for Christian, who has been at the cultural heart of the women's movement for more than a decade."

She ceased giving live performances in 1984, and began studying Siddha Yoga with Gurumayi Chidvilasananda. The result of these explorations were the albums The Fire of My Love and Songs of Ecstasy. She changed her first name to Shambhavi during this time and lived in an ashram in New York.

In 2002, Christian restarted her association with Olivia Records, and began performing again for label events; her first appearance since 1984 was on a cruise ship arranged by Olivia. She also performed on two weeklong Caribbean cruises to celebrate Olivia's 40-year anniversary in 2013.

== Personal issues ==
Christian has said that working with Olivia Records assisted her as a recovering alcoholic. She noted that writing songs as a "woman-identified-woman" was not only consistent with her concept of feminism, but had also developed an awareness of how music enabled emotional changes to be made without compromising her art. Christian described the emotions and moods of women's music, as helping women "know all that we are" and it helped her to deal with her anger and "listen to my inner voice, to what I truly want for myself, beyond all the shoulds and oughts." She later shared her experiences about time spent in the Alcoholism Centre for Women in Los Angeles and said that she had been validated by meeting other women dealing with the same issue.

== Discography ==
- I Know You Know (Olivia Records, 1974)
- Face the Music (Olivia, 1977)
- Turning it Over (Olivia, 1981)
- Meg & Cris at Carnegie Hall (live with Cris Williamson, Olivia, 1983)
- From the Heart (Olivia, 1984)
- Scrapbook (Olivia, 1986)
- The Fire of My Love (Syda Records, 1986)
- The Best of Meg Christian (Olivia, 1990)
- Songs of Ecstasy (Syda, 1995)
