= Holly Near =

American singer-songwriter, activist and actress (born 1949)

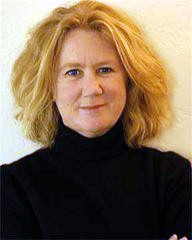
- Near in 2006

Background information
- Born: June 6, 1949 (age 77); Ukiah, California, U.S.
- Genres: Social change music, folk, cabaret
- Occupations: Musician, songwriter, actress, producer, motivational instructor
- Instrument: Vocals
- Years active: 1963–present
- Labels: Calico Tracks Music, Redwood Records, Appleseed Recordings
- Website: hollynear.com

Holly Near (born June 6, 1949) is an American singer-songwriter, actress, teacher, and activist.

== Early life ==
Near was born in Ukiah, California, United States, and was raised on a ranch in Potter Valley, California.

She was eight years old when she first performed publicly, and she auditioned for Columbia Records when she was ten.

After high school, Near enrolled in the Theatre Arts program at UCLA.

== Career ==
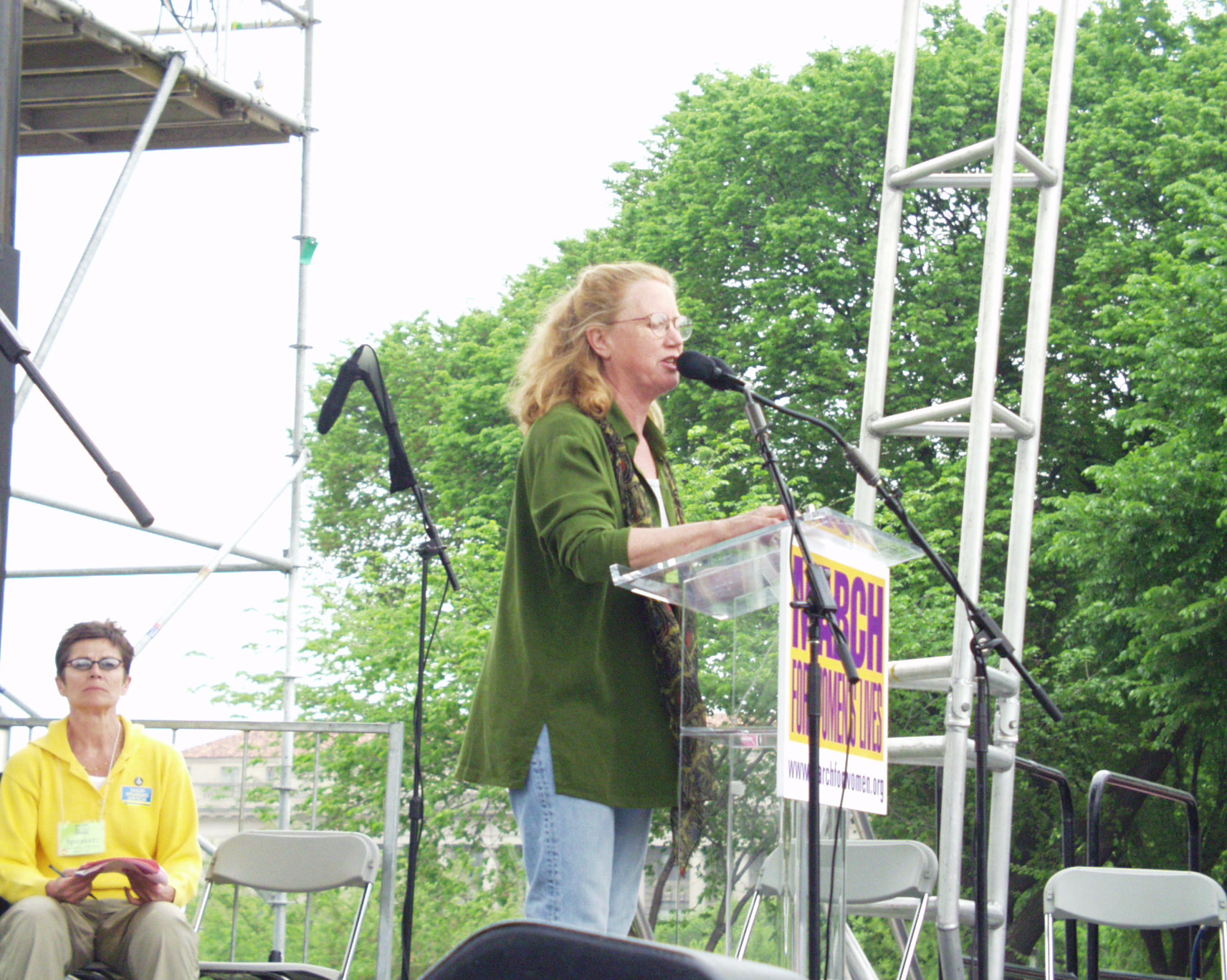
Near performs at the March For Women's Lives in 2004

Near's professional career began in 1969 with a part on the television show The Mod Squad, which was followed by appearances in other shows, such as Room 222, All in the Family, and The Partridge Family. She also appeared in Angel, Angel, Down We Go, Slaughterhouse-Five, and Minnie and Moskowitz. Much later, she had a prominent role in the 1991 film Dogfight.

She was briefly a member of the musical comedy troupe First National Nothing and appeared on the troupe's only album If You Sit Real Still and Hold My Hand, You Will Hear Absolutely Nothing, released in 1970 on Columbia Records.

In 1970, Near was a cast member of the Broadway musical Hair. Following the Kent State shootings in May of that year, the entire cast staged a silent vigil in protest. The song "It Could Have Been Me" (released on A Live Album, 1974) was her response to the shootings. In 1971, she joined the FTA (Free The Army) Tour, an anti-Vietnam War road show of music, comedy, and plays that performed for soldiers, many of whom were resisting war and racism from within the military. The tour was organized by antiwar activist Fred Gardner and actors Jane Fonda and Donald Sutherland. Near was only 21 and the youngest member of the troupe.

In 1972, Near founded an independent record label called Redwood Records to produce and promote music by "politically conscious artists from around the world". She was one of the first women to found an independent record company. Near's record company went out of business in the mid-1990s due to financial difficulties.

During her long career in folk and protest music, Near has worked with a wide array of musicians, including Ronnie Gilbert, Pete Seeger, Arlo Guthrie, Mercedes Sosa, Bernice Johnson Reagon, Bonnie Raitt, Jackson Browne, Meg (Shambhavi) Christian, Cris Williamson, Linda Tillery, Joan Baez, Phil Ochs, Harry Belafonte, and many others, as well as the Chilean exile group Inti-Illimani.

Near wrote an autobiography in the early 1990s titled Fire in the Rain, Singer in the Storm. Later, with her sister Timothy, Near co-wrote a one-woman show based on the stories in the book. The show was presented at The San Jose Rep and in Los Angeles at The Mark Taper Forum, as well as productions in San Francisco and off Broadway in NYC. In April 2004, Near performed at the March for Women's Lives in Washington, DC where she sang "We Are Gentle Angry People" and "Fired Up" a capella.

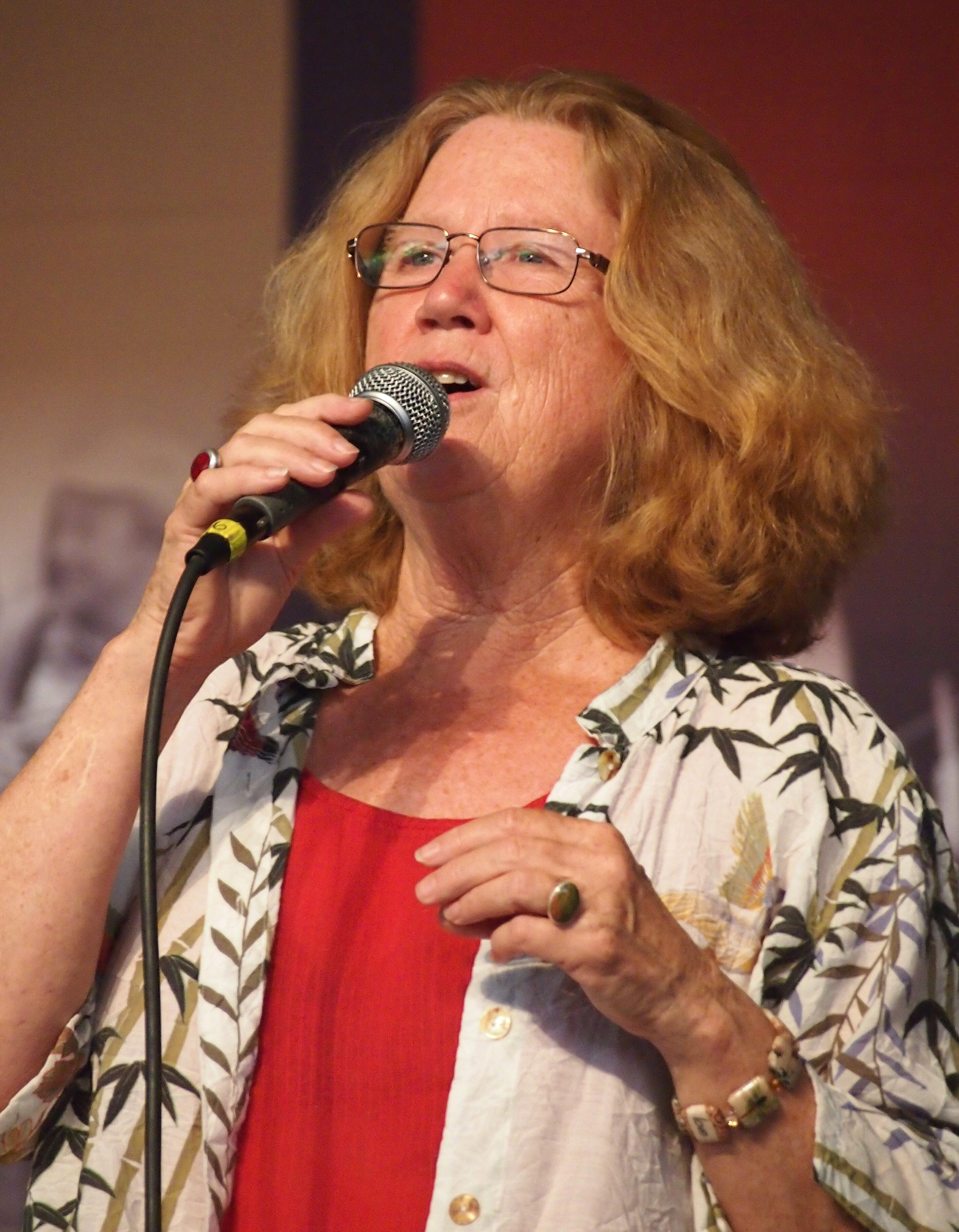
Near at Smithsonian Folkways Tribute to Pete Seeger, 2014

As of 2019, she has a discography of 29 albums. She is still active as a performer and composer, and she has begun issuing CDs available through her website that include tracks from her out-of-print albums. Her song "Singing For Our Lives" appears in Singing the Living Tradition, the official hymnal of the Unitarian Universalist Association, under the title "We Are A Gentle, Angry People" (Hymn #170). The hymn was performed by Quaker Friends in an episode of the TV series Six Feet Under. In 2015, the same song, credited as "Singing for Our Lives" appeared in the Australian independent film The Lives We Lead, alongside its theme song "I Am Willing", another protest song written by Near.

Near hosted many of the tributes to both Pete Seeger and Ronnie Gilbert, two members of the seminal folk group The Weavers.

Near has been an honored guest at several of the GALA Choruses Festivals, a conference of GLBTQ choirs and choruses. She also appears as a soloist with several of the choruses and many of her songs have been arranged for choral singing.

In 2018, Near released a new recording titled 2018, reflecting on issues including the environment, aging, domestic violence and the unresolved storm damage in Puerto Rico as a result of Hurricane Maria. In October 2018, a documentary film titled Holly Near: Singing for Our Lives made by director Jim Brown premiered at the Mill Valley Film Festival, detailing Near's life and work.

== Personal life ==
She has two sisters, Timothy and Laurel Near, and a brother, Fred Near.

As a result of her travels in the Pacific with the FTA show, Near became a feminist, linking international feminism and anti-war activism. In 1976, Near came out as a lesbian.

Near has been in a relationship with a man since 1994. However, she does not identify as bisexual. When asked why in a 2010 interview by JD Doyle for Queer Music Heritage, she replied,

I don't know why. Just isn't a handle I relate to. I include human and civil rights in all that I do. I am monogamous. I relate to that term. I am a feminist. If I am with a woman I am a feminist. If I am alone I am a feminist. If I am with a man I am a feminist. And until the one I am with and I part ways, then I am just what I am in that relationship and I don't much think about what I will do next. I focus more on what I bring to that relationship. It is a full-time job being honest one moment at a time, remembering to love, to honor, to respect. It is a practice, a discipline, worthy of every moment. I think my feminism and my ability to love has been highly informed by having had lesbian relationships. The quality of my life has, without question, been elevated. For a brief moment in time I struggled with sexual identity, somewhere in the mid-'80s. Then I realized it was the wrong question for me. That is not to say it is the wrong question for others. It just wasn't important to me. So I haven't really thought much about it since. I am going to sing lesbian love songs and support gay rights no matter what. The rest is public relations.

== Awards and honors ==
In 1984, Near was one of 11 'Women of the Year' named by Ms. Magazine.

In 1989, Near received a Doctorate of Humane Letters from World College West in California.

Near was named among the "1000 Women for the Nobel Peace Prize".

Near was named as an Honoree for National Women's History Month for 2015.

== Discography ==
- Hang in There, Redwood Records (1973) (Theme: support of the people of Vietnam)
- A Live Album, Redwood Records (1975)
- You Can Know All I AM, Redwood Records (1976)
- Imagine My Surprise, Redwood Records (1978) (with Meg Christian)
- Fire in the Rain, Redwood Records (1981) produced by June Millington
- Speed of Light, Redwood Records (1982)
- Journeys, Redwood Records (1983)
- Lifeline, Redwood Records (1983) (with Ronnie Gilbert)
- Watch Out!, Redwood Records (1984) (with John McCutcheon and Trapezoid)
- Sing to Me the Dream, Redwood Records (1984) (with Inti Illimani)
- HARP, Redwood Records (1985) (with Pete Seeger, Ronnie Gilbert and Arlo Guthrie)
- Singing With You, Redwood Records (1987) (with Ronnie Gilbert)
- Don't Hold Back, Redwood Records (1987)
- Sky Dances, Redwood Records (1989)
- Singer in the Storm, Chameleon Music Group (1990) (with Mercedes Sosa)
- Musical Highlights, Redwood Records/Calico tracks Music (1993) (from the play Fire in the Rain written by Holly Near & Timothy Near)
- This Train Still Runs, Abbe Alice Music (1996) (with Ronnie Gilbert)
- With a Song in My Heart, Calico Tracks Music (1997) (songs from the 30s & 40s) (pianist John Bucchino)
- Edge, Calico Tracks Music (2000)
- Cris & Holly, HC Recordings (2003) (with Cris Williamson, pianist John Bucchino)
- Show Up, Calico Tracks Music (2006)
- Sing to Me the Dream, Calico Tracks Music (2008) (an historic live recording of the 1984 Peace in the Americas Tour with Inti Illimani)
- We Came to Sing, Calico Tracks Music (2009) (with Emma's Revolution)
- Peace Becomes You, Calico Tracks Music (2012)
- 2018, Calico Tracks Music (2018)

=== Re-releases ===
- Simply Love: The Women's Music Collection, Calico Tracks Music (2000) (songs focused on feminism & lesbian issues)
- HARP: A Time to Sing, Appleseed Recordings (2001) (with Pete Seeger, Ronnie Gilbert and Arlo Guthrie, reissued as a 2-CD set from the 1985 HARP recording)
- Early Warnings, Appleseed Recordings (2001) (selections from Sky Dances and Watch Out! combined)
- Lifeline Extended, Appleseed Recordings (2002) (with Ronnie Gilbert)
- And Still We Sing: The Outspoken Collection, Calico Tracks Music (2002) (with Rhiannon, Inti Illimani, Ronnie Gilbert, HARP, Mercedes Sosa, Brian Lane Green—an historic collection of songs from previous recordings focused on social change and activism)
- Crushed: The Love Song Collection, Calico Tracks Music (2002) (a collection of love songs from earlier recordings)
- Hang In There, Redwood Records (1973) . Reissued Calico Tracks Music (2018)
- Imagine My Surprise, Redwood Records, (1978); Reissued Calico Tracks Music (2018)
- Fire In The Rain, Redwood Records, (1981) Reissued on Calico Tracks Music, (2018)
- Speed of Light, Redwood Records, (1982); Reissued Calico Tracks Music (2018)
- Watch Out, Redwood Records, (1984); Reissued Calico Tracks Music (2018)
- Skydances, Redwood Records, (1989); Reissued Calico Tracks Music, (2018)

=== Compilations ===
- Michigan Live '85: 10th Michigan Womyn's Music Festival, August Night Records (1985) "Fight Back" (solo), "Oh Mary Don't You Weep" (with Ronnie Gilbert and Linda Tillery) and "Waterfall" (with Rhiannon)
- Ben & Jerry's Newport Folk Festival, Alcazar Records (1988) "Step it Out Nancy"
- Ben & Jerry's Newport Folk Festival, Vol. 2, Alcazar Records (1988) "Once or Twice"
- Live from El Salvador, Redwood Records (1991) "Hay Una Mujer Desaparecida" (with Barbara Higbie)
- Rainbow Sign, Rounder Records (1992) "Oh, Mary Don't You Weep" (with Ronnie Gilbert, Arlo Guthrie and Pete Seeger)
- Cabaret Noël: A Broadway Cares Christmas, Lockett Palmer Records (1993) "O Holy Night" (with Brian Lane Green)
- The Story of the Chicken Made of Rags, Soul Vibrations, Redwood Records (1993) "Oh Me! Oh My!"
- George & Ira Gershwin: A Musical Celebration, MCA Records (1994) "But Not for Me"
- Lifelines, (Peter Paul & Mary) Warner Brothers (1995) "Home is Where the Heart Is" (duet with Mary Travers)
- Winter Moon: A Celebration of Gay and Lesbian Singers and Songwriters... and Friends, Streeter Music (1995) "Change of Heart"
- Pink Album, The Seattle Men's Chorus (1996) "Ella's Song", "Our Love is Soaring Across the Land" and "The Great Peace March"
- The Gay 90s Musical: Looking Back...Moving On... Varèse Sarabande Records (1997) "Simply Love"
- Folk Live from Mountain Stage, Blue Plate Music (1997) "Sun Won't Stop"
- Fruit Cocktail, Streeter Music (1997) "The Right to Love" (with Adrienne Torf)
- Where Have All the Flowers Gone: The Songs of Pete Seeger, Appleseed Records (1998) "Quiet Early Morning"
- A Love Worth Fighting For: A Celebration of Gay and Lesbian Singers and Songwriters, Streeter Music (2000) "Sit With Me"
- Change of Heart, The Women's Chorus of Dallas (2001) "Change of Heart," "Sun Won't Stop" and "The Great Peace March"
- Seeds: The Songs of Pete Seeger, Vol. 3, Appleseed Recordings (2003) "Precious Friend" (with Ronnie Gilbert, Robin Flower and Libby McLaren)
- Glass Half Full, Grazie Recordings (2006) "Gracias a La Vida" (with John Buccino)
- Needle in the Groove: Women Singing for Social Change (2006) "Fired Up"
- Sowing the Seeds – The 10th Anniversary, Appleseed Recordings (2007) "Somos El Barco" (with Ronnie Gilbert, Arlo Guthrie and Pete Seeger)

== Filmography ==
- Angel, Angel, Down We Go (1969), Tara Nicole Steele
- The Magic Garden of Stanley Sweetheart (1970), Fran
- The Todd Killings (1971), Norma
- Minnie and Moskowitz (1971), Irish
- F.T.A. (1972), Herself
- Slaughterhouse-Five (1972), Barbara Pilgrim
- The Weavers: Wasn't That a Time! (1982), Herself (documentary interview)
- Women of Summer (1985), Herself (documentary; performance at reunion)
- Dogfight (1991), Rose Sr.
- Heartwood (1998), Lucille Burris
- Radical Harmonies (2002) Herself (documentary; includes brief interview and archival performance footage)
- Holly Near: Singing For Our Lives (2018) Herself (documentary by Jim Brown; aired on the PBS American Masters series in 2019)

=== Television movies ===
- Mr. and Mrs. Cop (1974), Mrs. Salmon

=== TV appearances ===
- The Bold Ones: The Senator, Sylvia – in the episode "Power Play" (1970)
- Room 222, Esther – in the episode "The Lincoln Story" (1970)
- All in the Family, Mona – in the episode "Gloria Has a Belly Full" (1971)
- The Partridge Family, Phyllis – in the episode "The Selling of the Partridges" (1973)
- L.A. Law, Lucille Skerritt – in the episode "Spleen It to Me, Lucy" (1991)

== See also ==
- Women's music
