= Mary Watkins =

American pianist and composer (born 1939)

Mary D. Watkins (born 1939, Denver, Colorado) is an American composer and pianist in jazz and classical music.

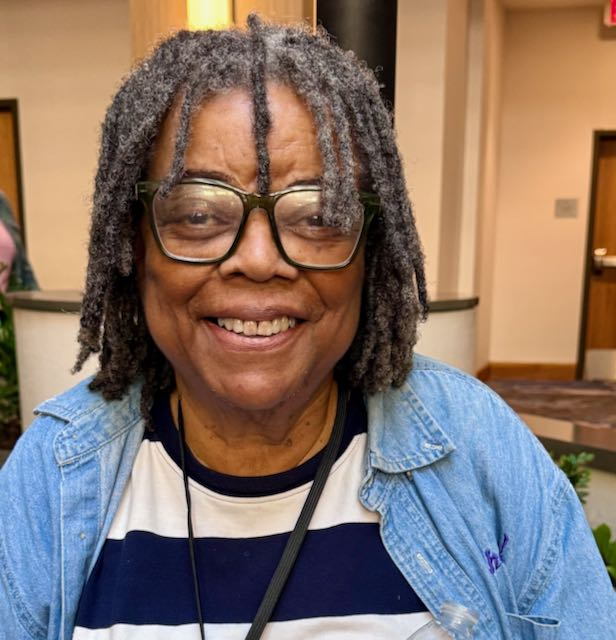
Watkins in 2026

Watkins graduated from Howard University in 1972 and began performing in jazz ensembles in Washington, D.C. shortly after. Watkins released several full-length albums and composed commissioned works for jazz ensembles, including a score for the play Lady Lester Sings the Blues and a jazz version of The Nutcracker ballet.

== Discography ==
- Something Moving (Olivia, 1978)
- Winds of Change (Palo Alto, 1981)
- Spirit Song (Redwood, 1985)
- The Soul Kings (Wenefil, 1992)
- Touch Heal & Deliver (DDS, 1995)
- Watkins' Five Movements in Color and Wilson's Of Visions and Truth: A Song Cycle, performed by the New Black Music Repertory Ensemble. (Center for Black Music Research, and Albany Records, 2010)
