= Women's music =

Movement of popular music for, by, and about women

Women's music is a type of music "by women, for women, and about women."

Women's music focused on topics of feminism, including the unfair treatment of women by society and their families. Its lyrics focused on women's individual power, women's solidarity, and community, including lesbians.

As an offshoot of the feminist movement, the genre was referred to as a musical expression of the second-wave feminist movement and included the women's labor, civil rights, and peace movements. The movement was started by lesbian performers such as Cris Williamson, Meg Christian, and Margie Adam, African-American musicians including Linda Tillery, Mary Watkins, Gwen Avery and activists such as Bernice Johnson Reagon and her group Sweet Honey in the Rock, and peace activist Holly Near. Women's music is not only associated with female performers but also all female workers in the industry, including studio musicians, producers, sound engineers, technicians, cover artists, distributors, promoters, and festival organizers.

== History ==
=== Roots ===
At the beginning of the 1970s, as second-wave feminism began, feminists did not fight for lesbians. While the Stonewall riots in 1969 became the cradle of the gay liberation movement, political feminists felt the danger of their past efforts and that their activities may be negatively labeled. They were often hostile to lesbians. Further fragmentation between straight women and lesbians during the era was caused by the National Organization for Women (NOW)'s rejection of lesbians. The first NOW president Betty Friedan labeled lesbians as the "lavender menace." A series of movements against the gay and lesbian communities began, with the central figures labeling gay liberation as counterrevolutionary and bourgeois. The rejection of lesbians led many politically-concerned women to join lesbian feminist collectives, and it sometimes led to lesbian separatism.

Women's music bands, such as Deadly Nightshade and the Chicago and New Haven Women's Liberation bands, were initially capturing the feminists' central point. They broadcast feminists' positions but did not highlight lesbians' points of view.

=== Origin ===
In 1963, lesbian American singer-songwriter Lesley Gore recorded and published her song "You Don't Own Me" expressing the threat of emancipation, as she says to a lover that they "don't own" her, that they are not to tell her what to do or what to say, and that they are not to put her on display. The song's lyrics became an inspiration for younger women and are sometimes cited as a factor in the second-wave feminist movement.

=== Development ===
In the late 1960s and early 1970s in the United States, some critics and musicians perceived that there were few "positive women's images within popular music" and a "lack of opportunities for female performers". They viewed women as having a disadvantage in the field because of their difference in gender. At the time, major US record labels had only signed a few women's bands, including Fanny, Birtha, The Deadly Nightshade, Goldie and the Gingerbreads, and the band that evolved into Isis. In reaction to this perceived lack of inclusion of women in the mainstream, some feminists decided it was necessary to create a separate space for women to create music. Lesbian and feminist separatism were then used as a "tactic which focused women's energy and would give an enormous boost to the growth and development of women's music."

The genre, which first came to be known as "lesbian music", has its roots in certain musical contributions of the 1960s and is defined by the artists and labels in the 1970s who built upon this foundation in order to foster a lesbian-oriented musical movement.

Out of the separatist movement came the first distributed examples of music created specifically for lesbians or feminists. In 1972, Maxine Feldman, who had been an openly gay performer since 1964, recorded the first overtly lesbian record, "Angry Atthis" (Atthis was a lover of the ancient Greek poet Sappho). Feldman had been performing the song since 1969, and its lyrics were specific to her feelings and experiences as a lesbian. In the same year, the feminist all-woman bands The Chicago Women's Liberation Rock Band and the New Haven Women's Liberation Rock Band released Mountain Moving Day. In 1973, Alix Dobkin, flautist Kay Gardner, and bassist Patches Attom created the group Lavender Jane, and recorded an album entitled Lavender Jane Loves Women, the first full-length album for and by lesbians. These early recordings relied on sales through mail order and in a few lesbian feminist bookstores, like Lambda Rising in Washington, D.C., as well as promotion by word of mouth. In May 1974, the women who would go on to form the first European women's rock band performed at a women's music festival in Berlin. They formed the German women's rock band Flying Lesbians and released one self-titled album in 1975.

=== Social/political impacts ===
Goldenrod Music Distribution, founded by Terry Grant in 1975, has been credited by Lauron Kehrer as a major influence in the launch of the women's music movement. Kehrer noted that although the organization was founded on the premise of helping women and lesbians, it was unable to work around the contradictions surrounding the company's ethics and place in a capitalist society.

In the later period of women's music, the focus became lesbian separatism. Most women's music festivals used either private land or one-time event contracts in order to ensure that they could exclude men from the space. Certain ones either excluded men above a certain age or did not even allow men. The most controversial shows were at the Michigan Womyn's Music Festival. The radical ideas from musicians crossed over into their music and their performances, which contained discrimination against other groups.

=== Purpose and influence ===
There are common European classical semiotic codes that have been used throughout centuries to express femininity. These musical gestures changed over time as the meaning of femininity changed from the image of a beautiful woman gazed at from the male point of view to a woman's view of herself full of strength and inner charm, but they always kept to their purpose: truthful expressionism.

Feminist musicians aimed to show a positive, proactive, and assertive image of women that not only critiqued the rifts in regards to gender, but also demonstrated the goals of the feminist movement in terms of social justice regarding gender and the right of privacy concerning abortion and birth control. With the goal of breaking down the gender divide and level the gender differences, some women in this genre of music "adopt[ed] male dress codes and hair styles". Women also voiced their opinions and the goals of the feminist movement through lyrics. In "I Am Woman", Helen Reddy sings, "I am woman/hear me roar/And I've been down there on the floor/No one's ever gonna keep me down again." Reddy creates a feeling of "girl power" that reflected the ambitions of the feminist movement.

Lesbians found ways to express themselves through music. Ethel Smyth, a composer, encoded her lesbian life experiences in her music. The genders of composers, writers, artists, and more have a lot to do with how music is perceived and interpreted. Cues such as tempo, articulation, and other dynamics signify many different types of meanings – they are not standard. Each musician uses these cues to suit their music and expresses themselves through song.

Additionally, as lesbian musicians expressed themselves through music, they broke the isolation of lesbians in North America. They let lesbians form a group identity and another possible coming-out process, such that they are able to hint about their identity to their families and friends by sending them recordings of lesbian musicians' work.

=== Decline in popularity ===
==== Label on musicians ====
The women's music classification is based on the identity of musicians such as women, feminist, lesbian, etc. This label gave the lesbian community chances to break their isolation from other communities, in that they can use women's music to hint at or show their identities as lesbians to others. However, due to being labeled as women's musicians, they may limit people's imagination about their music abilities. Some musicians are likely to give a more specific classification for their music based on the genre, thus expanding their listener base. Some musicians did not want to show their identity to the public due to the marketing aspect.

==== Fission in the community ====
===== Discrimination =====
During the later period of women's music, white female performers promoted ideas that led to discrimination against other groups, such as people of color, straight women, men, transgender people, even lesbians who had children and who had relationships with men before. The ideas that performers infused into their music caused audiences from those communities to get angry, which limited the listeners.

===== Separation between new and old lesbian separatists =====
Old lesbian separatist ideas, such as the exclusion of transgender women, were often more rigid and tended to dominate later women's music. The new generation of lesbians were more inclusive of transgender and other lesbian identities, leading to division between the two groups. For example, the transgender sound engineer Sandy Stone, was forced to resign from Olivia Records due to a group of women who threatened to boycott the company because of her identity as a transgender woman. This led to a series of movements during the era to protest the exclusion of transgender women from women-only spaces.

==== Financial and social issues ====
Due to the specialty of the purpose of women's music, creating a women-only space, and the shocks to traditional patriarchal society, it is difficult for the companies that focus on women's music to gain any financial success through it under a male-dominated and capitalist society, because male-dominated companies refuse to collaborate with them. Additionally, it appears clear that as women's music record labels tried to finance themselves, rarely anyone took the risk to invest. Thus, most women's music record labels shut down.

== Record labels, distributors, and publications ==
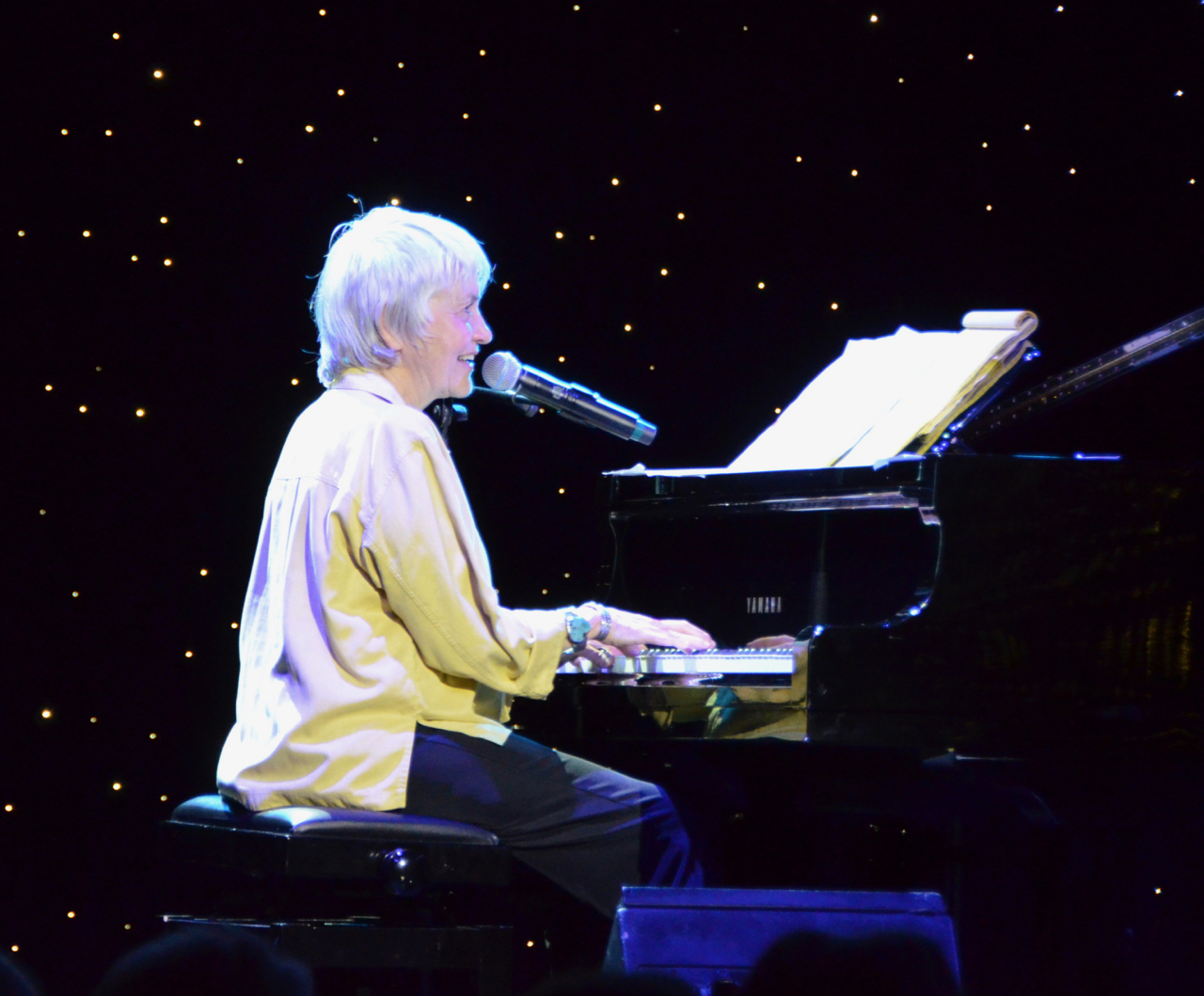
Cris Williamson, whose 1975 album The Changer and The Changed was the best-selling women's music album and one of the best-selling albums by an independent label during the 1970s, in concert in 2013

Olivia Records, the first women's music record label, was created in 1973 by a collective, including artist Meg Christian. Starting with a single that was successfully sold by mail order, Olivia was able to release Meg Christian's I Know You Know and Cris Williamson's The Changer and the Changed. The Changer and the Changed was "one of the all-time best selling albums on any independent label" at that time, and was also the first LP to be entirely produced by women. Changer is the all-time best-selling album to come out of the women's music genre.

Several other independent labels were created by artists, such as Kay Gardner with the record label Wise Woman/Urana, Margie Adam with the record label Pleiades, Ani DiFranco with the record label Righteous Babe Records, and Holly Near with the record label Redwood Records in 1972. Redwood Records expanded the scope of women's music recordings to include women of color by recording Sweet Honey in the Rock, an a cappella group of African-American singers founded by Bernice Reagon in 1978. As these record labels grew, so did the music genres represented, and the ethnic and social diversity of the artists expanded. Several other labels were also formed by artists; Berkeley Women's Music Collective, Woody Simmons, and Teresa Trull were distributed by Olivia through their network.

With the growth of independent record labels and increasing demand for women's music, an organized system for distribution and promotion became necessary. Goldenrod Music was formed in 1975 to distribute for Olivia Records, and later expanded distribution to include other labels. Ladyslipper, a non-profit organization formed in 1976 to promote and distribute women's music. Olivia's informal network formed WILD (Women's Independent Labels Distributors) in 1977 to distribute music into different regions of the United States. The organization had two purposes: to formally network and educate distributors on sales and business issues, and to bargain with Olivia while Olivia's financial pressures in turn pressured the distributors. In 1978, a national booking company, Roadwork Inc. was formed to promote women artists.

All throughout the 1980s and 1990s, many women's bookstores that sold women's records relocated into smaller spaces or shut down. As a result, Olivia Records spread out to different industries to help its music projects become more profitable. With this expansion Olivia Records entered the travel industry, and Olivia Cruises and Resorts was founded in 1990. However, even with this expansion, sales in women's music continued to decline dramatically.

There were many social and economic components that caused the women's music business to start failing in the 1980s and 1990s. In order to solve these different issues, the MIC (Music Industry Conference) came together to figure out what could be done. For an entire week, around 80 women in the music business discussed the prevalent questions and concerns that were affecting women's music at that time. The main topics at the conference were the drop in concert sizes, the unreal pay demands by the female performers, the lack of diversity in female artists, and how Olivia Records, which was initially intended to be a female-ran company, was giving high positions to men.

=== HOT WIRE: The Journal of Women's Music and Culture ===
HOT WIRE: The Journal of Women's Music and Culture was a women's music magazine published three times a year from 1984–1994. It was founded in Chicago by volunteers Toni Armstrong Jr., Michele Gautreaux, Ann Morris and Yvonne Zipter; Armstrong Jr. became the sole publisher in 1985. Tracy Baim of Windy City Times called HOT WIRE "the national voice of the burgeoning women's music movement and a wide-ranging chronicle of lesbian feminist culture." The magazine was a separatist publication named after Zipter's erotic poem "Finding the Hot Wire". The publication focused exclusively on lesbian feminist musicians, festivals, venues, and various topics pertaining to writing, theater, dance, comedy, and the arts. Each 64-page issue included a soundsheet with at least four songs by lesbian and/or feminist artists.

== Women's music festivals ==
The first women's music festival occurred in 1973 at Sacramento State University. In May, 1974 the first National Women's Music Festival was held in Champaign-Urbana, Illinois, founded by University of Illinois student Kristin Lems. It celebrated its fortieth year in Middleton, Wisconsin, from July 2–5, 2015. The Michigan Womyn's Music Festival was created in 1976, and became the largest women's music festival in the United States before ceasing operations after the fortieth festival in August 2015. The first West Coast Women's Musical and Cultural Festival, also known as Women's Music & Comedy Festival, was held in October 1980 in Yosemite. Robin Tyler and Tori Osborne co-produced the festival, which received seed money from an accident settlement. From 1985 to 1995, The West Coast Women's Music and Comedy Festival was held at Camp Tawonga. Every year, the organizers came with an all-female crew to set up an all-female space for a weekend of food and entertainment. On the stage were Melissa Etheridge, Sweet Honey and the Rock, Teresa Trull, Ferron, Casselberry and Dupree, Lucie Blue Tremblay, Holly Near, and Chris Williamson. The last known festival took place on Labor Day Weekend in 1995.

Other festivals are Lilith Fair which toured from 1997–1999 and the Ohio Lesbian Festival, near Columbus, Ohio, which was created in 1988 and continues to be an ongoing celebration of women's music and culture. Many other festivals have been created throughout the United States and Canada since the mid-1970s and vary in size from a few hundred to thousands of attendees. The newest festival is the Los Angeles Women's Music Festival, which kicked off in 2007 with over 2,500 attendees, and which was originally scheduled to return in 2009, but has been on indefinite hiatus after the first event.

Though the festivals are centered on music, they support many other facets of lesbian and feminist culture. Designed to provide a safe space for women's music and culture, many festivals are held on college campuses or in remote rural locations. Many festivals offer workshops on topics concerning the lesbian and feminist community, offer activities such as arts, crafts, fitness classes, and athletic events, and serve to provide opportunities for women to take advantage of resources they often cannot find in mainstream culture. One festival that provides such workshops is the National Women's Music Festival. In 1992, the festival provided workshops covering topics such as "drama", "film and video", "access-abilities", "women's health/sports and fitness", "older women", spirituality", "women's empowerment", "women of color", and a writer's conference in addition to other topics in a "general workshop series".

Bonnie Morris describes in her book Eden Built by Eves, how festivals serve women throughout the stages of their lives. Festivals support a safe space for coming of age rituals for young women, adult romance and commitment ceremonies, the expression of alternative perspectives on motherhood, and the expression of grief and loss. Though historically controversial, The Michigan Womyn's Music Festival is sometimes posed as an example of an environment that celebrates all women, not just those who conform to stereotypes in mainstream media. Morris describes attendees at the festival as "women who are sexy in wheelchairs, women who are sexy at 260 pounds, women who are sexy at age 70, long-term interracial romances – and all the rest of womenkind that television will not show or will tell us does not count." Festivals also help create a sense of community for lesbians. The National Women's Music Festival has in addition to the many lesbian participants and organizers, the festival's music, humor, and crafts promote a "positive lesbian identity". The festival has also been a place where women can openly display their sexuality, including same-sex affections.

Currently, festivals continue to thrive in the United States and other countries.

=== Michigan Womyn's Music Festival transgender exclusion controversy ===
The Michigan Womyn's Music Festival, MWMF or MichFest for short, was a subject of controversy for much of its existence due to its intention to create a space for "womyn-born-womyn". In 1991, Nancy Jean Burkholder was asked to leave MichFest on the basis of her being a trans woman; the festival subsequently implemented its "womyn-born-womyn" policy that faced fierce criticism from trans and LGBTQ+ activists and organizations. In 1995, Camp Trans was established and staged a protest just outside the festival's venue each year until 2010, when it was forced to shut down. Though the incident that happened in 1991 with Burkholder was the only time a trans woman was asked to leave the festival, the controversy became an organizing tool to protest the intention of the festival for 20 years. Petitions and boycotts ensued from notable organizations like GLAAD while MichFest founder Lisa Vogel insisted that it is not transphobic to have a "healthy, whole, loving space" for women who were assigned female at birth to come together. The festival ceased operations after its 2015 rendition.

While this controversy highlighted some of women's music's key issues with inclusivity, it is still notable that the "movement was engineered by an out trans woman" and that "Olivia Records, the radical feminist lesbian separatist music collective, was itself trans inclusive".

== See also ==
- Ladyfest
- Riot Grrl
- Radical Harmonies (2002 documentary about the history of women's music)
- Women in music
- Ruth Dworin, feminist music promoter and concert organizer
