= Cris Williamson =

American musician and activist (born 1947)

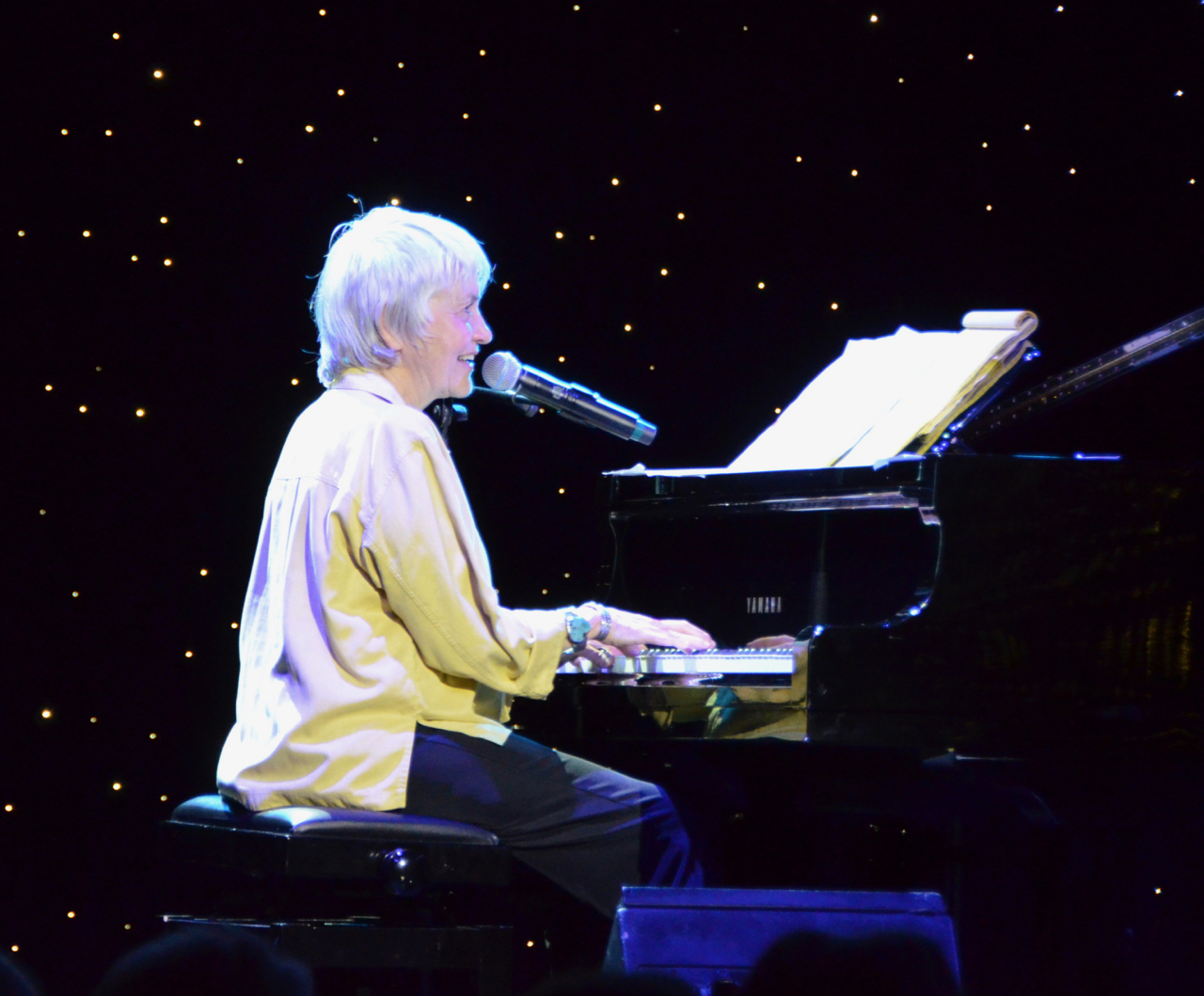
- Williamson performing in 2013

Background information
- Born: February 15, 1947 (age 79); Deadwood, South Dakota, U.S.
- Genres: Folk-rock, rock
- Occupations: Singer-songwriter, political activist
- Instruments: Piano, guitar, vocals
- Years active: 1964–present
- Website: www.criswilliamson.com

Cris Williamson (born February 15, 1947) is an American feminist singer-songwriter and recording artist. She was a visible lesbian political activist during an era when few who were unconnected to the lesbian community were aware of gay and lesbian issues.

Williamson's music and insight have served as a catalyst for change in the creation of women-owned record companies in the 1970s. Using her musical talents, networking with other artists working in women's music, and her willingness to represent those who did not yet feel safe in speaking for themselves, Williamson is credited by many in the LGBTQ community for her contributions, both artistically, and politically, and continues to be a role model for a younger generation hoping to address concerns and obtain recognition for achievements specific to people who have historically been ignored.

Throughout her career, Williamson has released dozens of albums on both Olivia Records and her own Wolf Moon Records label. Her 1975 Olivia album, The Changer and the Changed, became one of the best-selling independent albums of all time and is considered a ground breaking album within the women's music genre.

== Early life ==
Williamson was born in 1947 in Deadwood, South Dakota, although her family moved to Colorado and Wyoming when she was still young. Williamson has recalled that she lived in a small isolated town and at some expense, was taken to piano lessons by her mother from when she was around 5 or 6 years of age. Her mother insisted that "no matter how far out in the mountains or the wilderness we are, my kids are going to have culture." Her musical idol at the time was Judy Collins, and Williamson developed a musical style and sound that was similar to that of Collins.

== Career ==
=== Career beginnings ===
Williamson released her first album, The Artistry of Cris Williamson in 1964, when she was sixteen. She became a local musical sensation in Sheridan, Wyoming, releasing two subsequent LPs. In 1967–68, Williamson played and sang in a local Denver band named The Crystal Palace Guard. Williamson graduated from the University of Denver. She supported herself initially as a school teacher, while at the same time collaborating with other women who were also singer-songwriters and performing artists. She began to network with Holly Near, Meg Christian, and Margie Adam, all musicians who became women artists of stature, forming an entirely new genre of music, primarily about and for women.

=== Olivia Records ===
Williamson became close friends with Meg Christian and during a radio interview in Washington, D.C., in 1973, when Christian was discussing the challenges with her record label, Williamson is recorded as asking "well, why don't you just start a women's record company?" A group, which became the Olivia collective, met two days later and decided to establish a women's record label aimed at gay women. The independent label Olivia Records was founded the next day. The founders of the label saw it as an opportunity to build on the increased awareness of lesbian feminist causes and give gay women a voice in the cultural mainstream that reflected their experiences. The founders also aimed to "keep profits in the pockets of lesbian artists and sound technicians, and power in the hands of female label heads who would create alternative channels for production and distribution in an industry controlled by men." The label was criticised at the time as being discriminatory, but Williamson said they were "for women, not against men...[adding]...why is it like that, the dichotomy? It's a false equivalency. It's a way to dumb it down and take the power out of it."

==== The Changer and the Changed ====
Olivia Records released Williamson's The Changer and the Changed (1975) which became one of the best-selling independent releases of all time. Described as "the cornerstone of the feminist 'women's music' movement", the album was rated in 2017 as number 123 on the NPR (National Public Radio) list of the greatest albums made by women. The Changer and the Changed was also the first LP to be entirely produced by women, and is the all-time best-selling album to come out of the women's music genre. Every aspect of the album was entirely created by women, including the sound engineers, musicians, and the photographer and graphic designer responsible for the album artwork.

William Ruhlmann of AllMusic writes:

"The Changer and the Changed was to women's music what Michael Jackson's Thriller was to the music industry in general in the mid-'80s, an album that sold far beyond the perceived size of the market, more than 100,000 copies in its first year of release. Eventually, it reportedly sold more than 500,000 copies, which would make it a gold album, although it has not been certified as such by the RIAA. (That does not disprove the sales estimate, however. Albums are not certified automatically; a record company must request certification and pay for an audit.)"

Williamson went on to record more than a dozen further albums with Olivia Records, then after its demise formed her own label, Wolf Moon Records. This helped to set the pace for other recording artists who found it difficult to work with the major record labels.

=== Collaborations ===
In 1982, Williamson collaborated with Estonian artist/author Viido Polikarpus on a science fiction/fantasy fable LP and book (with Polikarpos' artwork) entitled Lumiere, which was released on Pacific Cascade Records.

Williamson recorded two albums with her long-time producer and lover at the time, Tret Fure. The first of these, recorded in the fall of 1982, was a children's album called Lumiere ...A Science-Fantasy Fable, which won a Parents' Choice Award. Fure is said to have helped "add a more produced, harder-rocking sound to Williamson's LPs Prairie Fire and Wolf Moon...[and]...with Postcards from Paradise, the two abandoned their solo careers to form a permanent duo act." Williamson and Fure ended their 20-year relationship in 2000, and each now records as a solo artist.

Williamson has worked as a session musician both to support herself and to lend assistance to other fellow artists. She has collaborated with other women's music artists, including Meg Christian and Teresa Trull. Musician Bonnie Raitt has played on some of her albums.

=== Present day ===
As of 2025, Williamson continues to tour and release new albums.

== Political activism and charity work ==
Williamson has been a lesbian feminist and a promoter of women owned music companies.

Writing in the Los Angeles Times in 1984, Steve Pond noted that Williamson was "initially put off by the political stridency of the early Olivia scene" but became more active and in the same article she is quoted as saying: "There are a lot of broken women in the women's movement, women just edged and barbed and ready to go off, and a lot of women who simply do not want Olivia to change."

She has worked on a teaching project with Bonnie Raitt that offered songwriting workshops called 'Catch and Release.'

== Use in hip-hop ==
Williamson's "Shine on Straight Arrow" was sampled by late hip hop producer J Dilla in the song "The Red" from the 2003 album Champion Sound (with Madlib as Jaylib), as well as producer Knxwledge for the instrumental "498" on his 2009 debut EP 3P. Her song "Waterfall" from The Changer and the Changed has also been sampled by various other hip hop artists such as Raekwon on his song "A Rainy Day" from his 2013 album Fly International Luxurious Art. Additionally, various voice clips from Williamson's 1982 storybook LP Lumière were sampled on the 2002 song "Astroboy" by hip-hop and electronic producer Daedelus.

== Awards ==
On September 12, 2018, Williamson and Olivia Records co-founder Judy Dlugacz received the Jack Emerson Lifetime Achievement Award from the Americana Music Association. At the ceremony, Williamson noted: "We've sold out Carnegie Hall three times. This is the first time we've been acknowledged by the industry...[adding]...a woman singing to another woman...it's not such a big deal now, because now love is love is love."

== Discography ==
- 1964 The Artistry of Cris Williamson
- 1965 A Step at a Time
- 1965 The World Around Cris Williamson
- 1971 Cris Williamson
- 1975 The Changer and the Changed
- 1978 Live Dream
- 1980 Strange Paradise
- 1982 Blue Rider
- 1982 Lumière
- 1983 Meg/Cris at Carnegie Hall
- 1985 Prairie Fire
- 1985 Snow Angel
- 1987 Wolf Moon
- 1989 Country Blessed (with Teresa Trull)
- 1990 The Best of Cris Williamson
- 1991 Live in Concert: Circle of Friends
- 1994 Postcards from Paradise
- 1997 Between the Covers
- 1999 Radio Quiet
- 2001 Ashes
- 2003 Cris & Holly (with Holly Near)
- 2003 Replay
- 2005 The Essential Cris Williamson
- 2005 Real Deal
- 2005 The Changer and the Changed: A Record of the Times [30th Anniversary Enhanced]
- 2007 Fringe
- 2008 Winter Hearts
- 2010 Gifthorse
- 2013 Pray Tell
- 2017 Motherland
- 2022 Harbor Street
- 2024 Ravens and the Roses
