= Rock and Roll Survivors =

Studio album by Fanny
- Released: 1974
- Studio: Producers Workshop, Los Angeles; Mama Jo's, Los Angeles
- Genre: Rock
- Length: 36:23
- Label: Casablanca
- Producer: Vini Poncia

Fanny chronology
Mothers Pride (1973)	Rock and Roll Survivors (1974)	Fanny Live (1998)

Singles from Rock and Roll Survivors
- 1. "I've Had It" Released: May 1974; 2. "Butter Boy" Released: November 1974

Rock and Roll Survivors is the fifth and final studio album by American rock band Fanny, released in 1974 on Casablanca Records. The album marked the only appearances by guitarist Patti Quatro and drummer Brie Howard, who replaced original members June Millington and Alice de Buhr (though Howard had been a member of the band in its early days). Produced by Vini Poncia, it was the band's only album for Casablanca. The album features the band's highest charting single "Butter Boy" (US #29).

The album was reissued on CD in 2009 by Cherry Red Records.

== Background ==
Having recorded four studio albums for Reprise Records between 1970 and 1973, Fanny moved to Casablanca Records for Rock and Roll Survivors and worked with the label's house producer Vini Poncia, who succeeded previous Fanny producers Richard Perry and Todd Rundgren. Guitarist Patti Quatro (older sister of Suzi) and drummer Brie Howard had joined Fanny in 1973–1974, making their recording début with the band on Rock and Roll Survivors.

The album was approached by the band as a conceptual piece. "With the addition of Patti into the band, who was very theatrical, that was just the direction it was taking," bassist Jean Millington said in 2009. "It's really about after all that we'd been through, we had still survived. We were rock and roll survivors."

The album's first single, "I've Had It", a cover of the Bell Notes' 1958 song, reached #79 on the Billboard Hot 100. The second single, the doo-wop influenced rocker "Butter Boy", reached #29 on the Billboard Hot 100 in April 1975 and was one of Casablanca's first Billboard Top 40 hits. Written by Jean Millington, the song is partially inspired by her relationship with David Bowie, who she dated for over a year, and is described by Millington as "sort of tongue in cheek."

By the time "Butter Boy" became a hit, the Rock and Roll Survivors lineup had disintegrated. Brie Howard and keyboardist Nickey Barclay had left the band in 1974, soon followed by Patti Quatro in early 1975. In the spring of 1975, a new lineup, including Fanny's original guitarist June Millington and a returning Howard, toured under the name the L.A. All-Stars, but eventually broke up in 1976.

Both Jean Millington and Nickey Barclay have expressed dissatisfaction with the album. "I'm not particularly proud of the album," Millington said in 2003. "Musically, I think it's the weakest album out of all the albums ... but for the time, it was happening. It was a rock and roll glam show." In 2002, Barclay called it "a crock of shit", feeling that producer Vini Poncia tried to make the band sound like "featherweight sugarcoated pop dollies."

== Critical reception ==
Professional ratings
Review scores
Source	Rating
AllMusic	3/5 stars
Get Ready to Rock!	2.5/5 stars

In their December 1974 Top Album Picks, Billboard magazine wrote that with Rock and Roll Survivors, Fanny remains "one of the more powerful and exciting rock bands around," and that the band has "once again put together a set of potential singles and another step forward."

Thom Jurek, writing retrospectively for AllMusic, said that the album is not "as bad as the reviews of the time made it out – specifically in the United States (in the U.K. the album was received quite well, both critically and commercially)." He felt that the album reflected Casablanca Records' desire for "sheeny, tight, slick, studio glitz," adding that "it falls emotionally flat in several places despite excellent songs." Jurek felt that the "pure, hard rock power" of the band's earlier albums was missing with Rock and Roll Survivors' emphasis on keyboards and drums and less on guitars. "Production is the problem here," Jurek wrote, "and in many ways it can't be held against Fanny, who showed up with solid material and the right personnel – Quatro is a killer guitarist." He concluded that, despite its flaws, Rock and Roll Survivors "is a very decent recording, and despite its dated sound, holds up as an accurate reflection of the era in rock music."

Pete Whalley, writing for the Get Ready to Rock! website, felt that the band seemed uncertain of their musical direction, commenting, "Unfortunately, any album with the word 'survivors' in the title usually signals a band in decline." He described the music as "somewhere between hard rock and the rock and roll of the Fonz and the Shangri-Las."

== Track listing ==
Side one
No.	Title	Writer(s)	Lead vocals	Length
1.	"Rock and Roll Survivors"	Nicole Barclay	Barclay	4:27
2.	"Butter Boy"	Jean Millington	Millington	3:22
3.	"Long Distance Lover"	Patti Quatro	Quatro	3:35
4.	"Let's Spend the Night Together"	Mick Jagger, Keith Richards	Millington	3:31
5.	"Rockin' (All Nite Long)"	Quatro	Quatro	2:38

Side two
No.	Title	Writer(s)	Lead vocals	Length
6.	"Get Out of the Jungle"	Quatro	Quatro	3:58
7.	"Beggar Man"	Quatro	Quatro	4:05
8.	"Sally Go 'Round the Roses"	Lona Stevens, Zell Sanders	Howard	3:30
9.	"I've Had It"	Carl Bonura, Ray Ceroni	Barclay	3:02
10.	"From Where I Stand"	Barclay	Howard, Barclay	3:49
Total length:				36:23

== Personnel ==
Adapted from the album's liner notes.

Fanny

- Patti Quatro – guitar, vocals
- Jean Millington – bass, vocals
- Nicole Barclay – keyboards, vocals
- Brie Howard – drums, vocals

Additional musicians

- James Newton Howard – synthesizer, clavinet

Technical personnel

- Vini Poncia – producer
- Bob Schaper – engineer, mixing
- Doug Sax – mastering
- John Bilecky – photography
