= ZOS (disambiguation) =

Zos or ZOS may refer to:

- z/OS, a 64-bit operating system for IBM z/Architecture mainframes
- Radio ZOS, a Bosnian local commercial radio station
- ZOS: Zone of Separation, a Canadian television drama mini-series
- ZOS Messaging Service, a cellular network location communication standard
- IATA code for Cañal Bajo Carlos Hott Siebert Airport

== See also ==
- Zoss, a surname
