= Mothers Pride (album) =

Studio album by Fanny
- Released: February 1973
- Recorded: November 1972, January 1973
- Studio: Secret Sound, New York; Olympic Studios, London
- Genre: Rock
- Length: 45:31
- Label: Reprise
- Producer: Todd Rundgren

Fanny chronology
Fanny Hill (1972)	Mothers Pride (1973)	Rock and Roll Survivors (1974)

Singles from Mothers Pride
- 1. "Summer Song" Released: January 1973 (UK); 2. "All Mine" Released: March 1973 (US); 3. "I Need You Need Me" Released: April 1973 (UK); 4. "Last Night I Had A Dream" Released: June 1973 (US); 5. "Solid Gold" Released: 1973 (US promo)

Mothers Pride (sometimes spelled Mother's Pride) is the fourth studio album by American rock band Fanny, released in February 1973 on Reprise. Produced by Todd Rundgren, it was the band's last album to feature original members June Millington (guitar) and Alice de Buhr (drums), and their final album for Reprise.

The album was reissued on CD in 2016 by Real Gone Music, expanded with eight bonus tracks.

== Background ==
Most of Mothers Pride was recorded in New York City at producer Todd Rundgren's Secret Sound Studio in January 1973. Keyboardist Nickey Barclay said in 1973: "The only person that the four of us could agree on to produce us — that was available to produce us – was Todd, and he was into it. We'd done a few gigs with him, and he liked the idea." In November 1972, Fanny recorded demos for the album at Spot Productions Limited in London, and also recorded the track "Summer Song" at London's Olympic Studios the same month. It would be the only track on the album not recorded at Rundgren's Secret Sound.

Guitarist June Millington and bassist Jean Millington later expressed dissatisfaction with the album, feeling it was overproduced. They had wanted a more raw and live sounding production as well as input in the final mixes. "When it came to mixing the album, [Rundgren] essentially locked us out of the studio," Jean Millington said in 2003.

The album includes two covers: Randy Newman's "Last Night I Had a Dream" and London pub band Uncle Dog's "Old Hat." Nickey Barclay had often performed with Uncle Dog as a "floating member".

Drummer Alice de Buhr's off key lead vocal performance on "Solid Gold" was, according to Fanny's official website, recorded while drunk. The song would later be covered by the Who's Keith Moon on his 1975 album Two Sides of the Moon.

The album takes its title from a line in the album track "I'm Satisfied", and is also a nod to a brand of bread in the UK.

June Millington and Alice de Buhr both left the band in late 1973. The rest of the band continued with replacements and released one more album in 1974, Rock and Roll Survivors.

== Critical reception ==
Professional ratings
Review scores
Source	Rating
AllMusic	4/5 stars
Robert Christgau	C+
New Musical Express	Favorable

Charles Shaar Murray of the New Musical Express called the album "truly excellent", writing that Todd Rundgren's production "has made all the difference." He felt that "teaming him up with Fanny was definitely a masterstroke." Music critic Robert Christgau's one line review said, "In which [former producer] Richard Perry bows to Todd Rundgren, June Millington aims for the balls and shoots some guy through the knee, and Alice de Buhr sings (off key) (best thing here)."

Lindsay Planer, writing retrospectively for AllMusic, called Mothers Pride one of Fanny's "most ambitious efforts" where the band blend "anthem-esque rock with increasingly introspective ballads." Planer felt that the album contains some of the band's best original material, and noted that there is a "darker and more pensive edge pervading much of the album, perhaps suggesting the internal struggles that were beginning to divide and ultimately conquer the group."

Reviewing the 2016 CD reissue, Tony Peters of the Icon Fetch website wrote, "Rundgren chose to scale back the hard rock of their previous album, Fanny Hill, in favor of emphasizing song structure and harmonies. The result, Mothers Pride, sounds more like a Todd solo album than anything Fanny did before." He highlighted "Long Road Home," which he called "another in a long line of Fanny songs that should've been hits," and "All Mine," which was "surprisingly soulful with a fantastic chorus."

== Track listing ==
Adapted from the 2016 reissue liner notes.

Side one
No.	Title	Writer(s)	Lead vocals	Length
1.	"Last Night I Had a Dream"	Randy Newman	Barclay	3:53
2.	"Long Road Home"	June Millington	June Millington	2:53
3.	"Old Hat"	David Skinner	Barclay, Millington, Millington, de Buhr	4:14
4.	"Solid Gold"	Nickey Barclay	de Buhr	2:54
5.	"Is It Really You?"	Barclay	Barclay, Jean Millington	5:18
6.	"All Mine"	June Millington, Jean Millington	Millington, Millington	3:23

Side two
No.	Title	Writer(s)	Lead vocals	Length
7.	"Summer Song"	June Millington	Barclay, Millington, Millington, de Buhr	3:08
8.	"Polecat Blues"	June Millington	June Millington	3:12
9.	"Beside Myself"	Barclay, Jean Millington	Jean Millington	3:54
10.	"Regular Guy"	Barclay	Barclay	2:22
11.	"I Need You Need Me"	Barclay	Jean Millington, Barclay	4:53
12.	"Feelings"	Barclay, June Millington	June Millington	1:59
13.	"I'm Satisfied"	Barclay	Barclay	3:09
Total length:				45:31

2016 expanded edition CD bonus tracks
No.	Title	Writer(s)	Length
14.	"Lonesome Pine" (demo)	Barclay	4:43
15.	"Beside Myself" (demo)	Barclay, Jean Millington	4:06
16.	"I'll Never Be the Same" (demo)	June Millington	4:08
17.	"All Mine" (demo)	Millington, Millington	4:25
18.	"Old Milwaukee" (demo)	Tret Fure	3:11
19.	"Long Road Home" (demo)	June Millington	3:29
20.	"Back in My Arms Again" (unissued recording)	Brian Holland, Lamont Dozier, Eddie Holland	3:43
21.	"'Till Then" (demo)	June Millington	0:18
Total length:			73:24

Notes

- Tracks 14–19, 21 recorded at Spot Productions Limited, London, November 8, 1971. Produced by Alice de Buhr, (Note: Alice de Buhr in 2002: "We got really loaded and just played and played, and the next day I went back and mixed it down. That's why I was given credit for producing. I didn't really actually produce it. It was just us jamming, and nobody else wanted to go back and mix it.") except track 21 by June Millington.
- Track 20 recorded at Mayfair Sound Studio, London, April 1973. Producer unknown, engineered by John Hudson.

== Personnel ==
Adapted from the album's liner notes.

Fanny

- June Millington – guitar, acoustic guitar, lead and backing vocals
- Jean Millington – bass, lead and backing vocals
- Nickey Barclay – piano, organ, keyboards, acoustic guitar, lead and backing vocals
- Alice de Buhr – drums, percussion, lead and backing vocals

Additional musicians

- John Payne – flute (6)
- Barry Rogers – trombone (8)
- The Fannets (Todd, Jocko, Todd) – backing vocals (6)

Technical personnel

- Todd Rundgren – producer, engineer, mixing (except 7), Cauliflower sound effect (6)
- Glyn Johns – engineer, mixing (7)
- Andy Johns – engineer, mixing (7)
- Rod Dyer, Inc. – design
- Leandro Correa – cover photography
- Bob Jenkins – liner photography

Notes

- Horns, Mellotron and synthesizer are listed in the liner notes as "a joint collaboration".
- The production on "Summer Song" (track 7) is credited to Fanny and Mark Hammerman on the label of its UK single release (Reprise – K 14220). In the liner notes of the First Time in a Long Time: The Reprise Recordings box set, the production on "Summer Song" is credited to Paul Buckmaster and June Millington.
