= Fanny Hill (album) =

Studio album by Fanny
- Released: February 1972
- Recorded: December 4–18, 1971
- Studios: Apple Studios, London
- Genre: Rock
- Length: 41:13
- Label: Reprise
- Producer: Richard Perry

Fanny chronology
Charity Ball (1971)	Fanny Hill (1972)	Mothers Pride (1973)

Singles from Fanny Hill
- 1. "Ain't That Peculiar" Released: 1972; 2. "Wonderful Feeling" Released: 1972

Fanny Hill is the third studio album by American rock band Fanny, released in February 1972 by Reprise Records. It was recorded at Apple Studios in London and reached No. 135 on the US Billboard 200 charts. A single from the album, a cover of Marvin Gaye's "Ain't That Peculiar", became a minor hit, peaking at number 85 on the US Billboard Hot 100. It is named after Fanny Hill, a 1748 erotic novel which was, in the 1960s, repeatedly prosecuted and republished.

== Background and recording ==
By late 1971, Fanny had achieved some critical and commercial success, with the title track to the album Charity Ball reaching the Billboard top 40.

Fanny Hill was recorded at Apple Studios in London and produced by Richard Perry. Former Beatles associate Geoff Emerick engineered the album. Regular Rolling Stones sidesmen Bobby Keys and Jim Price performed on several tracks, particularly the Stones-influenced "Borrowed Time".

The opening track was a cover of Marvin Gaye's "Ain't That Peculiar", which was rearranged to include Latin-influenced percussion and a slide guitar solo from June Millington. It was released as a single, reaching No. 85 on the Billboard Hot 100. The group also covered the Beatles' "Hey Bulldog". Their arrangement included different lyrics from the original, which were reportedly approved by the Beatles.

== Release ==
The album was originally released in February 1972 by Reprise Records. It reached No. 135 on the Billboard 200 chart. In 2015, an expanded version was released on CD by Real Gone Records, including out-takes and backing tracks.

== Critical reception ==
Professional ratings
Review scores
Source	Rating
AllMusic	4/5 stars
Robert Christgau	B−
Pitchfork	8.5/10

The album received a good review in Rolling Stone, who said "the number of groups that can inspire affection the way Fanny have with this album, simply from the pure exuberance of their music, are far and few between". Robert Christgau had mixed opinions on the album, saying half of the original material was reasonable but that the group "give themselves away" (sic) by the two covers that opened each side. In a retrospective review, AllMusic's Mark Deming called it the group's "strongest and most exciting work."

== Track listing ==
Side one
No.	Title	Writer(s)	Lead vocals	Length
1.	"Ain't That Peculiar"	Smokey Robinson, Warren "Pete" Moore, Robert Rogers, Marvin Tarplin	June Millington	4:05
2.	"Knock on My Door"	Nickey Barclay	Jean Millington	3:20
3.	"Blind Alley"	Barclay, Alice de Buhr	Barclay, Jean Millington	4:15
4.	"You've Got a Home"	June Millington	June Millington	3:50
5.	"Wonderful Feeling"	Jean Millington	Jean Millington	3:19
6.	"Borrowed Time"	Barclay	Barclay	3:25

Side two
No.	Title	Writer(s)	Lead vocals	Length
7.	"Hey Bulldog"	John Lennon, Paul McCartney	Millington, Millington, Barclay	3:56
8.	"Think About the Children"	June Millington	Millington, Millington	4:02
9.	"Rock Bottom Blues"	Millington, Millington, Barclay, de Buhr	de Buhr (harmony vocal by Barclay)	3:07
10.	"Sound and the Fury"	June Millington	June Millington	3:05
11.	"The First Time"	Barclay	Barclay	4:49
Total length:				41:13

2015 expanded edition CD bonus tracks
No.	Title	Writer(s)	Length
12.	"Tomorrow" (album outtake)	June Millington	2:16
13.	"Young and Dumb" (non-album single, 1972)	Ike Turner	3:33
14.	"No Deposit, No Return" (unissued recording, circa 1971)	Barclay	2:27
15.	"Wonderful Feeling" (single version; remix)	Jean Millington	3:17
16.	"Rock Bottom Blues" (backing track)	Millington, Millington, Barclay, de Buhr	3:08
17.	"Rock Bottom Blues" (original vocal)	Millington, Millington, Barclay, de Buhr	3:14
Total length:			59:50

Notes

- Tracks 12, 15–17 from Fanny Hill sessions; recorded at Apple Studios, December 1971.
- Track 13 produced by Roy Silver, Mark Hammerman and Lord Trenchtown, engineered by Robert Appère.
- Track 14 recorded at Village Recorders, Hollywood. Produced by Richard Perry, engineered by Richard Moore.

== Personnel ==
Taken from the album's sleeve notes.

=== Fanny ===
- June Millington – electric, acoustic and slide guitar, clavinet, percussion, lead and backing vocals
- Jean Millington – bass, lead and backing vocals
- Nickey Barclay – piano, organ, keyboards, lead and backing vocals
- Alice de Buhr – drums, tambourine, lead and backing vocals

=== Additional personnel ===
- Bobby Keys – saxophones (1, 6, 9)
- Jim Price – brass (6, 9, 11)

=== Technical personnel ===
- Richard Perry – production
- Geoff Emerick – engineering
- Phillip MacDonald – engineering
- Andy Johns – engineering
- Alan Harris – engineering
- Doug Sax – mastering
- David Bailey – front cover photo
- Amalie R. Rothschild – rear cover photo
