= Fanny (album) =

1970 debut album by rock band Fanny

Studio album by Fanny
- Released: December 1970
- Studio: The Village Recorder, Los Angeles
- Genre: Rock
- Length: 40:30
- Label: Reprise
- Producer: Richard Perry

Fanny chronology
Fanny (1970)	Charity Ball (1971)

Singles from Fanny
- 1. "Changing Horses" Released: November 1970; 2. "Seven Roads" Released: March 1971 (Germany); 3. "Badge" Released: 1971 (New Zealand)

Professional ratings
Review scores
Source	Rating
AllMusic	4/5 stars
Robert Christgau	C
Spectrum Culture	68%
The Vinyl District	B+

Fanny is the debut album by the American rock group Fanny, released in December 1970 on Reprise.

== Background ==
In 1969, the rock band Wild Honey, featuring sisters Jean and June Millington, bass and guitar, respectively, and drummer Alice de Buhr, were spotted by producer Richard Perry's secretary. Perry arranged a trial session at Wally Heider Studios and concluded, "This is a band that needs to be recorded." The group added keyboardist and singer Nickey Barclay and began recording in early 1970, renaming themselves Fanny. The material included a cover of Cream's single "Badge".

The group were disappointed by Perry's production, feeling it didn't "bring out the best" in the group or reflect their live performances, though this would improve on later albums.

== Release and reception ==
The album was released in December 1970. Robert Christgau gave the album an average review, though he said the cover of "Badge" was "a cute idea". A Canadian pressing of the album used the wrong master tapes, and consequently had a different track listing, including a cover of Maxine Brown's "One Step at a Time".

Real Gone Music re-released the album on CD in 2013. AllMusic's Stephen Thomas Erlewine wrote a favourable review, again singling out the cover of "Badge", and comparing the group's sound and arrangements to Badfinger.

== Track listing ==
Side one
No.	Title	Writer(s)	Length
1.	"Come and Hold Me"	June Millington, Jean Millington	2:46
2.	"I Just Realized"	Nickey Barclay, June Millington	4:00
3.	"Candlelighter Man"	Millington, Millington	3:35
4.	"Conversation with a Cop"	Barclay	3:09
5.	"Badge"	Eric Clapton, George Harrison	3:01

Side two
No.	Title	Writer(s)	Length
6.	"Changing Horses"	Barclay	3:48
7.	"Bitter Wine"	Barclay	3:17
8.	"Take a Message to the Captain"	Barclay	3:31
9.	"It Takes a Lot of Good Lovin'"	Alvertis Isbell, Booker T. Jones	4:25
10.	"Shade Me"	Barclay	4:39
11.	"Seven Roads"	Millington, Millington, Alice de Buhr	4:19

== Personnel ==
Adapted from the album's liner notes.

Fanny

- June Millington – guitar, vocals
- Jean Millington – bass, vocals
- Nickey Barclay – piano, organ, vocals
- Alice de Buhr – drums, percussion, vocals

Technical

- Richard Perry – producer
- Roy Silver – associate producer
- Richard Moore – engineer
- Don Lewis – cover photography
