= Charity Ball =

Studio album by Fanny
- Released: July 1971
- Studio: Village Recorders, Los Angeles Sunset Sound Recorders, Hollywood Larrabee Sound Studios, Hollywood
- Genre: Rock
- Length: 38:52
- Label: Reprise
- Producer: Richard Perry

Fanny chronology
Fanny (1970)	Charity Ball (1971)	Fanny Hill (1972)

Singles from Charity Ball
- 1. "Charity Ball" Released: 1971

Charity Ball is the second studio album by the American rock group Fanny, released in July 1971 on Reprise. The album's title track became the group's first top 40 hit.

Professional ratings
Review scores
Source	Rating
AllMusic	4/5 stars
Robert Christgau	B+

== Background ==
The album was, like the previous year's debut Fanny, produced by Richard Perry. The songs were all written by the group, with the exception of a cover of Buffalo Springfield's "Special Care". The group experimented with a wider range of musical styles than the first album, including ballads and funk in addition to straightforward rock 'n' roll. The photograph of the band used in the front cover artwork was taken by Candice Bergen.

== Critical reception ==
Music critic Robert Christgau wrote, "This record exploits [drummer Alice de Buhr's] chops and presence, sinking the pop harmonies in a harder, funkier frame. The title tune is a pure raver that oughta be a hit, but almost every song has something—or several somethings—to recommend it."

In a retrospective review, AllMusic's Mark Deming said that Charity Ball, in comparison with the group's first album, is a "stronger, more confident, and more enjoyable disc," writing that "the push and pull between June Millington's tough guitar figures and Nickey Barclay's rollicking keyboards yield more exciting results here." He felt that the band has better songs on Charity Ball, but that the production is "sometimes a bit more polished than this music needed."

== Release ==
The album reached No. 150 on the Billboard 200. The title track was released as a single, reaching No. 40 on the Billboard Hot 100.

== Track listing ==
Side one
No.	Title	Writer(s)	Length
1.	"Charity Ball"	June Millington, Jean Millington, Alice de Buhr	2:30
2.	"What Kind of Lover"	Nickey Barclay	2:58
3.	"Cat Fever"	Barclay	3:23
4.	"A Person Like You"	Barclay	2:58
5.	"Special Care"	Stephen Stills	4:23
6.	"What's Wrong With Me"	Jean Millington	1:42

Side two
No.	Title	Writer(s)	Length
7.	"Soul Child"	Barclay, Millington, Millington	3:49
8.	"You're the One"	Millington, Millington	4:09
9.	"Thinking of You"	June Millington	3:24
10.	"Place in the Country"	Barclay	4:04
11.	"A Little While Later"	Barclay	5:39
Total length:			38:52

2014 expanded edition CD bonus tracks
No.	Title	Writer(s)	Length
12.	"Charity Ball" (single version)	Millington, Millington, de Buhr	2:29
13.	"Charity Ball" (live version)	Millington, Millington, de Buhr	5:47
14.	"Place in the Country" (live version)	Barclay	3:39
Total length:			50:54

== Personnel ==
Adapted from the album's liner notes.

Fanny

- June Millington – guitar, vocals
- Jean Millington – bass, vocals
- Nickey Barclay – piano, organ, vocals
- Alice de Buhr – drums, percussion, vocals

Technical

- Richard Perry – producer
- Richard Moore – engineer (Village Recorders), remixing (Wally Heider's)
- Bill Lazarus – engineer, remixing (Sunset Sound)
- Matt Hyde – engineer (Larrabee Sound)
- Tom Harvey – remixing (Sunset Sound)
- Dean O. Torrence – album design
- Candice Bergen – cover photo of Fanny
- Kim Tucker – cover photo
- Layton Huber – prop design
