= ZMS =

ZMS may refer to:

- Zamboanga Master Sardines, a Filipino professional basketball team
- ZMS, a series of processors manufactured by ZiiLABS
- ZMS, a messaging system used by the mobile app Lango
- ZOS Messaging Service, a protocol for exchanging geo coordinates
- Mbesa language, a Bantu language code ISO 639-3
- The Union of Socialist Youth
