= Fanny Walked the Earth =

Studio album by Fanny Walked the Earth
- Released: March 2, 2018
- Recorded: 2017
- Studio: Institute for Musical Arts
- Genre: Rock
- Length: 33:29
- Language: English
- Label: Blue Élan
- Producer: Dave Darling

Fanny chronology
First Time in a Long Time – The Reprise Recordings (2002)	Fanny Walked the Earth (2018)

"They weren't written with a particular approach in mind. It had been 50 years since we first played together. All those years of life experience, time on our instruments, having shared our history together and apart, led to the stories written about on this record. There's a huge difference in what there is to write about now than when we were in our teens and early 20's."

—Drummer Brie Howard-Darling on recording Fanny Walked the Earth

Fanny Walked the Earth is a 2018 studio album by a reformed version of American rock band Fanny named Fanny Walked the Earth. It has received positive reviews from critics.

== Recording and release ==
A Fanny reunion show in 2016 led the band members to decide to record a new album and intended to tour, but health issues kept the band from being able to perform live. The recording process was documented by the 2022 film Fanny: The Right to Rock and it featured a number of women guest musicians who were influenced by Fanny's original run.

== Reception ==
Editors at AllMusic rated this album 3 out of 5 stars, with critic Stephen Thomas Erlewine writing that band "aren't as hard-edged as" they were in the 1970s, "but that's also the appeal of this record" as "there's a warmth in the trio's interplay", good harmony, and "strong, melodic tunes, which makes this an appealingly understated comeback". Writing for NPR's Songs We Love, Ann Powers chose to spotlight "Lured Away" and stated that this album "conveys the same effervescent spirit the 1970s Fanny possessed; these women see no need to sit on stools and wax gentle about their position as rock 'n' roll elders".

== Track listing ==
1. "Lured Away" – 3:05
2. "When We Need Her" – 3:20
3. "Walk the Earth" – 4:10
4. "Girls on the Road" – 3:03
5. "One" – 3:16
6. "It Happened Here" – 1:40
7. "Not My Monkey" – 2:51
8. "Cool Girl" – 2:28
9. "What Are You Waiting For" – 2:49
10. "Storm-Crossed" – 3:29
11. "Love Farmers" – 3:19

== Personnel ==
Fanny Walked the Earth

- Brie Howard-Darling – drums, percussion, vocals, art, album design
- Jean Millington-Adamian – bass guitar, vocals
- June Millington – guitar, vocals

Additional personnel

- "Mustang" Sherry Barnett – backing vocals
- Dave Darling – additional guitar, keyboards, mixing, production
- Zackary Darling – audio engineering
- Alice DeBuhr – double drums
- Wendy Haas-Mull – Hammond B3 organ, backing vocals
- Bobbi Jo Hart – photography
- Susanna Hoffs – backing vocals
- Teresa James – piano, backing vocals
- Naia Kete – backing vocals
- Leah Kunkel – backing vocals
- Emily Lazar – audio mastering
- Lee Madeloni – audio engineering
- Marita Madeloni – photography
- Muhr Design – layout
- Vicki Peterson – backing vocals
- Patti Quatro – backing vocals
- Genya Ravan – backing vocals
- Toshi Reagon – backing vocals
- Sherrah Taylor – piano
- Kathy Valentine – backing vocals
- Linda Wolf – photography

== See also ==
- 2018 in American music
- List of 2018 albums
