= Zoss =

Zoss is a surname. Notable people with the surname include:

- A. O. Zoss, American engineer
- Roland Zoss (born 1951), Swiss songwriter and novelist
- Joel Zoss (born 1944), American singer, guitarist, songwriter, and author

== See also ==
- Moss (surname)
- Ross (name)
