= Barbra Joan Streisand (album) =

Studio album by Barbra Streisand
- Released: August 1971
- Recorded: April–May 1971
- Studio: United (Las Vegas)
- Genre: Pop
- Length: 41:23
- Label: Columbia
- Producer: Richard Perry

Barbra Streisand chronology
Stoney End (1971)	Barbra Joan Streisand (1971)	Live Concert at the Forum (1972)

Singles from Barbra Joan Streisand
- 1. "Where You Lead" / "Since I Fell For You" Released: June 1971; 2. "Mother / "The Summer Knows" Released: 1971; 3. "Space Captain" / "One Less Bell To Answer / A House Is Not A Home" Released: 1971

Barbra Joan Streisand is the thirteenth studio album by American singer Barbra Streisand, released in August 1971 on Columbia Records. It was her second consecutive album produced by Richard Perry and features backing work by members of the female band Fanny. Like the two previous studio albums, the singer continued to opt for a more contemporary repertoire, this time choosing three songs by Carole King, two by John Lennon, two by Burt Bacharach and Hal David in medley form, one each by Laura Nyro and the trio Michel LeGrand, Marilyn Bergman and Alan Bergman, and one by Donald Fagen and Walter Becker, who would go on to form Steely Dan.

Three singles were released from the album, two of which had a moderate performance on the Billboard Hot 100 chart and were a hit on the Adult Contemporary chart. The album was well received by audiences and critics and went gold in the United States, Belgium and Sweden.

== Production and release ==
In the late 1960s, Columbia Records began pressuring Barbra to record albums with more contemporary songs, as her albums until then consisted of big band songs, broadway musicals, and cabarets. The first attempt failed, and the 1969 album What About Today? became the first sales failure in the singer's career. Success would come with the follow-up album Stoney End, which sold over a million copies in the United States alone. With the next album, Barbra Joan Streisand, the singer continued to choose a more current repertoire. The album includes interpretations of many contemporary singer-songwriters of the day, including John Lennon, Laura Nyro, and three selections from Carole King's iconic 1971 album Tapestry. It also includes the first recording of "I Mean to Shine", written by the then-unknown Steely Dan duo of Donald Fagen and Walter Becker (Steely Dan did not issue their first record until the following year).

Three singles were released to promote the album. The first one is from the music "Where You Lead", composed by Carole King and released in the US as a single in June 1971. It charted at number 40 on the Billboard Hot 100 and number 3 on the Adult Contemporary chart. "Mother" was released as the second single; it reached number 79 on the Billboard Hot 100 and number 24 on the AC Chart. The third and final single, "Space Captain", bubbled under the hot 100 at #105.

== Critical reception ==
Professional ratings
Review scores
Source	Rating
AllMusic	4.5/5 stars
The Encyclopedia of Popular Music	3/5 stars

The album received favorable reviews from music critics.

William Ruhlmann from AllMusic website gave the album four and a half star out of five and wrote that although the singer "was not able to make the final transition into the pop/rock realm" thanks to the fact she doesn't compose her songs, she was as effective "making other people's songs her own".

Billboard magazine wrote that the material was "fine" and choose the songs "Where You Lead", "Love", "Space Captain" and "Beautiful" as the album's cuts.

Stephen Holden from Rolling Stone magazine gave the album an unfavorable review and wrote that Streisand "invariably dramatizes and stylizes whatever she sings", he praised the songs "Since I Fell For You" and "The Summer Knows". But regarding the Carole King and John Lennon songs she recorded, he wrote: "god, forbid". The Encyclopedia of Popular Music gave the album three out of five stars.

== Commercial performance ==
The album reached #11 on the Billboard Pop Albums chart and was certified Gold by the RIAA. The album peaked #25 in Canada. It peaked #99 in the 1971's Year-end chart of the Cash Box magazine. According to the liner notes of Barbra's retrospective box set Just for the Record, the album also received a record certification in Belgium and in Sweden.

== Track listing ==
Side one

1. "Beautiful" (Carole King) – 2:15
2. "Love" (John Lennon) – 3:06
3. "Where You Lead" (Carole King, Toni Stern) – 2:58
4. "I Never Meant to Hurt You" (Laura Nyro) – 3:51
5. "Medley: One Less Bell to Answer/A House Is Not a Home" (Burt Bacharach, Hal David) – 6:33

Side two

1. "Space Captain" (Matthew Moore) – 3:22
2. "Since I Fell for You" (Buddy Johnson) – 3:27
3. "Mother" (John Lennon) – 4:40
4. "Theme from Summer of '42 (The Summer Knows)" (Michel LeGrand, Marilyn Bergman, Alan Bergman) – 3:43
5. "I Mean to Shine" (Donald Fagen, Walter Becker) – 2:55
6. "You've Got a Friend" (Carole King) – 4:54

== Charts ==
Weekly chart performance for Barbra Joan Streisand
Chart	Peak position
US Billboard 200	11

== Certifications and sales ==
Region	Certification	Certified units/sales
United States (RIAA)	Gold	500,000^{^}
^{^} Shipments figures based on certification alone.

== Personnel ==
- Guitar: Mike Deasy, Hugh McCracken, June Millington, Louis Shelton, John Uribe, Eric Weissberg
- Bass guitar: Larry Knechtel, Jean Millington, Joe Osborn
- Keyboards: Nickey Barclay, Nick De Caro, Donald Fagen, Lincoln Mayorga, Larry Muhoberac,
  Richard Perry, Billy Preston, Mike Rubini
- Drums: Hal Blaine, Alice de Buhr, Jim Gordon, Jim Keltner
- Percussion: Alice de Buhr, Richard Perry
- Horns: Bobby Keys, Jim Price
- Woodwinds: Gene Cipriano
- Backing Vocals: Oma Drake, Venetta Fields, Clydie King, Shirley Matthews
