= Fanny (band) =

American rock band

- Fanny on the cover of their 1972 album Fanny Hill (clockwise from left: Jean Millington, June Millington, Alice de Buhr, Nickey Barclay)

Background information
- Origin: Los Angeles, California, United States
- Genres: Rock; hard rock
- Years active: 1969–1975; 2007; 2023
- Labels: Reprise; Casablanca
- Spinoffs: Fanny Walked the Earth (2018–2021)
- Past members: June Millington; Jean Millington; Alice de Buhr; Nickey Barclay; Patti Quatro; Brie Brandt; Cam Davis
- Website: www.fannyrocks.com

Fanny was an American rock band, active in the early to mid 1970s. They were one of the first all-female rock groups to achieve critical and commercial success, including two Billboard Hot 100 Top 40 singles.

The group was founded by sisters June and Jean Millington (on guitar and bass respectively), who had been playing music together since they moved from the Philippines to California in the early 1960s. After playing through several variations of the band, they attracted the interest of producer Richard Perry who signed them to Reprise Records in 1969 as Fanny. The band recorded four albums together before June quit the group, leading to the original line-up splitting. Following a final album, Fanny disbanded in 1975. The Millington sisters have continued to play music together since the split, and with a former drummer, Brie Howard-Darling, formed the spin-off group Fanny Walked the Earth in 2018.

The group attracted critical acclaim for rejecting typical girl group styles and expectations of women in the rock industry, instead emphasizing their musical skills. Later groups such as the Go-Go's, the Bangles, and the Runaways cited Fanny as a key influence.

- Fanny billboard, Sunset Boulevard

== Career ==
Sisters June and Jean Millington moved with their family from the Philippines to Sacramento, California, in 1961. They began to play music together on ukuleles, which helped them gain friends. In high school they formed an all-female band called the Svelts with June on guitar, Jean on bass, Addie Lee on guitar, and Brie Brandt on drums. Brandt left to get married and was later replaced by Alice de Buhr.

Lee and de Buhr later formed another all-female band, Wild Honey. The Millington sisters later joined this band as well. Wild Honey played Motown covers and eventually moved to Los Angeles. Frustrated by a lack of success or respect in the male-dominated rock scene, Wild Honey decided to disband after one final open-mic appearance at the Troubadour Club in Los Angeles in 1969. They were spotted at this gig by the secretary of producer Richard Perry, who had been searching for an all-female rock band to mentor.

Perry convinced Warner Bros. Records to sign the band, still known as Wild Honey, to Reprise Records. The group won the contract without the label hearing them play, on the grounds of being a novelty act, despite their genuine musical talent. Warner Bros. installed the band in a rented mansion formerly owned by Hedy Lamarr, on Marmont Lane near Sunset Boulevard. Prior to recording their first album, the band recruited keyboardist Nickey Barclay while bringing in early Svelts member Brie Brandt.

The band was then renamed Fanny, not with a sexual connotation but to denote a female spirit. Of it, June Millington stated: "We didn't know what Fanny meant in England, not at all. I wanted to have a name that had a girl's name in it, plus you know, Fanny Brice, your own Aunt Fanny, that was a legitimate woman and girl's name, and I loved the kind of straight-laced, formidable quality..." The initial lineup consisted of June on guitar, Jean on bass, de Buhr on drums, Barclay on keyboards, and Brandt on lead vocals and percussion. Perry dismissed Brandt because he wanted the group to be a self-contained four-piece band like the Beatles. The Millingtons and Barclay all assumed lead vocal duties on alternating songs, while de Buhr sang lead occasionally on later albums.

Perry produced the band's first three albums, beginning with Fanny in 1970. Because of the connection to Perry and Reprise Records, Barclay was invited to tour with Joe Cocker as a backing singer, and consequently appeared on the album Mad Dogs and Englishmen. The group's cover of Cream's "Badge" from the first album earned significant radio airplay. The follow-up album, Charity Ball, was released the following year and its title track reached number 40 on the Billboard Hot 100. The members of Fanny also worked as session musicians, and played on Barbra Streisand's 1971 albums Stoney End and Barbra Joan Streisand, because Streisand had wanted to record with a small band.

The group continued to pick up well-known fans; David Bowie sent the group a letter admiring their work and invited the band to a post-show party where he showed them mime techniques. With young engineer Leslie Ann Jones as their road manager and live sound mixer, Fanny toured worldwide, opening for Slade, Jethro Tull and Humble Pie, gaining widespread popularity in the United Kingdom. A 1971 article in Sounds remarked that the group "seems that they are the support group to everyone these days". The group made several live television appearances during tours, including The Sonny and Cher Show, American Bandstand, The Old Grey Whistle Test and Beat-Club.

The group's third album, Fanny Hill (1972) featured the Beatles' engineer Geoff Emerick in addition to Perry's production. It included covers of the Beatles' "Hey Bulldog" (with a new verse) and Marvin Gaye's "Ain't That Peculiar". The latter featured regular Rolling Stones saxophonist Bobby Keys, and was released as a single, reaching number 85 on the Billboard Hot 100. Fellow Stones sideman Jim Price also played brass on the album. Rolling Stone wrote a rave review of the album, praising the group's musical skills and particularly June's ability to play both lead and rhythm guitar.

Their fourth album, Mothers Pride (1973), was produced by Todd Rundgren. By the time Mothers Pride was released, June was feeling constrained by the group format. The record label wanted her to wear certain designer clothes and adopt a hard rock image, which she resisted. She decided to quit the group, later saying "I needed to figure out who I was" while she regularly clashed with Barclay due to conflicting personalities. June moved to Woodstock, New York to study Buddhism, but insisted that the group continue without her.

De Buhr also left the band, with a returning Brandt replacing her on drums. Patti Quatro (sister of Suzi Quatro) replaced June on guitar. This lineup signed with Casablanca Records and released the final Fanny album, Rock and Roll Survivors, in 1974. The first single, "I've Had It" reached number 79 on the Billboard Hot 100. Brandt left the band shortly after the album's completion when she married composer James Newton Howard, and was briefly replaced by Cam Davis. During this time, Fanny backed Keith Moon on his cover of their "Solid Gold" for his album Two Sides of the Moon. Another recording they did with Moon, "I Don't Suppose", was not released until a years later reissue of the album. Barclay quit the group at the end of 1974 to pursue other interests. Concurrently, the album's second single, "Butter Boy", written by Jean about Bowie, became their biggest hit, reaching number 29 on the Billboard Hot 100 in April 1975. By the time that single was released, the group had split.

== Post-split activities ==
After the breakup in 1975, the Millington sisters put together a new line-up of Fanny for a short tour, though no older Fanny material was played. This group ultimately morphed into a renamed all-women band called the L.A. All-Stars. Some interest was shown by record labels who stipulated that the band tour as Fanny and play only Fanny songs, which June opposed. This ended the chance of a Fanny reunion.

June subsequently released three solo albums in the 1980s and has had a career as a producer for artists including Holly Near, Cris Williamson and Bitch and Animal. She operates the Institute for Musical Arts, a non-profit organization supporting girls and women in music. Jean was married to Bowie's guitarist Earl Slick for a time and later became an herbalist. The Millingtons continued to record together after Fanny as well, most recently on the 2011 album Play Like a Girl on June's label Fabulous Records. Nickey Barclay released a solo album titled Diamond in a Junkyard in 1976 then withdrew from the music industry. De Buhr later worked in marketing for several major record labels, and promoted the Go-Go's, who cited Fanny as an influence. She collaborated with Real Gone Music in a reissue program for the group's albums.

Patti Quatro continued to work as a session musician for her sister Suzi and was involved in the reissue of material by the Quatro sisters' early band the Pleasure Seekers. Brie Brandt, later known as Brie Howard-Darling and currently as Brie Darling, had an active post-Fanny career, fronting the bands American Girls, which released one album in 1986, and Boxing Gandhis, which has released four albums since the mid-1990s. She has also acted in films such as 1982's Android and is the mother of Playboy Playmate Brandi Brandt. Quatro and Brandt both toured with Electric Light Orchestra and appeared on the album A New World Record in 1976.

In 2002, Rhino Records released the limited edition 4-CD box set First Time in a Long Time, which collected Fanny's first four studio albums along with live recordings, outtakes, and promotional items. A reunion concert featuring the Millington sisters and de Buhr (Barclay declined to appear for health reasons) was held at Berklee College of Music on April 20, 2007, where the band members received the ROCKRGRL Women of Valor award for their achievements. The first four original Fanny albums are available on Real Gone records, with updated liner notes, pictures, and new mixes.

In 2016, Brie Howard joined a live performance by the Millington sisters. This inspired the formation of a new band called Fanny Walked the Earth. An album also titled Fanny Walked the Earth was released in March 2018. The album marks the first time June, Jean, and Brie all recorded at the same time in nearly 50 years.

Fanny were the subject of the documentary film Fanny: The Right to Rock, released in 2021 and directed by Bobbi Jo Hart. Fanny performed at Yerba Buena Gardens on May 20, 2023.

== Musical style and legacy ==
Fanny was not the first all-female rock band to sign with a major label, coming after Goldie and the Gingerbreads and the Pleasure Seekers. However, the earlier groups released only singles, so Fanny were the first all-female ensemble to release a full-length album on a major label and one of the first to achieve top 40 success on the Billboard Hot 100. Fanny's music was influenced by the Beatles and the Funk Brothers, the loose studio musician collective on Motown records.

The band resisted suggestions by the record company to dress in a typical girl group style or emphasize any sex appeal; the band also rehearsed regularly, wanting to acquire a reputation based on their musical talent. Jean later said that Fanny had to have a strong live presence in order to overcome audience's perceptions that women could not play rock music well. June added, "We knew we had to prove we could play and deliver live. Otherwise, no one would believe it."

The group were more successful in the UK and Europe, where audiences appreciated their music and respected their work, than in the US. De Buhr was disappointed to discover that some record company executives merely treated Fanny as a gimmick that should not be taken seriously. Promoter Bill Graham was reluctant to give the group a headlining slot at venues, for fear the group would split up as the members got married and had children, though the group have stressed this was due to business pragmatics and not chauvinism. During tours, female fans would ask the group how to form a band. Later all-female bands such as the Runaways and the Bangles cited Fanny as a key influence.

A retrospective review of the group's career in Rebeat stressed that Fanny were simply a good band, irrespective of gender. June has been praised for her guitar skills, and was described by Guitar Player as the hottest female guitar player in the music industry. During her time in Fanny, she initially favored the Gibson ES-355 and Fender Twin Reverb amp, before acquiring a Gibson Les Paul Junior guitar and Traynor amplifiers. She used the Les Paul primarily for slide guitar playing. Jean's main instrument in Fanny was a 1963 Fender Precision Bass, which is still in her possession.

Little Feat bandleader Lowell George was a fan of Fanny and jammed with the group when they were in Los Angeles. In a 1999 interview with Rolling Stone, David Bowie revealed his respect for the band:

They were one of the finest fucking rock bands of their time, in about 1973. They were extraordinary: they wrote everything, they played like motherfuckers, they were just colossal and wonderful, and nobody's ever mentioned them. They're as important as anybody else who's ever been, ever; it just wasn't their time.

== Personnel ==
=== Original line-up ===
- Jean Millington – bass, vocals (1969–1975)
- June Millington – guitar, vocals (1969–1973)
- Nickey Barclay – keyboards, vocals (1970–1974)
- Alice de Buhr – drums, vocals (1969–1973)

=== Later members ===
- Patti Quatro – guitar, vocals (1974–1975)
- Brie Howard – drums, vocals (1973–1974)
- Cam Davis – drums (1974–1975)

=== Fanny Walked the Earth ===
- Jean Millington-Adamian – percussion, vocals
- June Millington – guitar, vocals
- Patti Quatro – guitar, vocals
- Alice de Buhr – drums, percussion
- Brie Howard-Darling – drums, percussion, vocals
- Mia Huggins – bass
- Lee Madeloni – bass, percussion

== Discography ==
=== Studio albums ===
- Fanny (1970)
- Charity Ball (1971) (No. 150)
- Fanny Hill (1972) (No. 135)
- Mothers Pride (1973)
- Rock and Roll Survivors (1974)
- Fanny Walked the Earth (2018, as Fanny Walked the Earth)

=== Live albums ===
- Fanny Live (1998; recorded 1972) (reissued as Fanny: Live in 1972)
- Live on Beat-Club '71-'72 (2024)

=== Compilation albums ===
- First Time in a Long Time – The Reprise Recordings (4-CD box set, 2002)
- The Reprise Years 1970-1973 (4-CD box set, 2024) (Substantially similar to the previous 4-CD collection but with some notable differences)

=== U.S. singles ===
- "Ladies' Choice" / "New Day" (1970)
- "Nowhere to Run" / "One Step at a Time" (1970)
- "Changing Horses" / "Conversation with a Cop" (January 1971)
- "Charity Ball" / "Place in the Country" (September 1971) (No. 40)
- "Ain't That Peculiar" / "Think About the Children" (March 1972) (No. 85)
- "Wonderful Feeling" / "Rock Bottom Blues" (July 1972)
- "Young and Dumb" / "Knock on My Door" (October 1972)
- "All Mine" / "I Need You Need Me" (January 1973)
- "Last Night I Had a Dream" / "Beside Myself" (April 1973)
- "I've Had It" / "From Where I Stand" (June 1974) (No. 79)
- "Butter Boy" / "Beggar Man" (January 1975) (No. 29)

== See also ==
- List of all-female bands
- List of guests appearing on The Midnight Special
- List of sibling musical groups
