= Dougal Butler =

British author and retired roadie

Peter "Dougal" Butler is a British author and retired roadie. He is best known for being Keith Moon's personal assistant during the 1970s, and for publishing several books about Moon's life, Full Moon and Keith Moon – A Personal Portrait.

== Biography ==
Butler grew up in London at the same time as the Who became successful. He left school at 15 and worked for HM Customs and Excise (as had John Entwistle) before becoming a roadie for the band in 1967 or 1968. According to Butler, one of his early tasks for the band was to provide a getaway car so that Pete Townshend could steal a guitar from Jim Marshall's music shop in Ealing. He quickly became friends with Moon, regularly visiting the Speakeasy Club and after a spell of becoming personal assistant to Entwistle for 18 months, decided to switch to looking after Moon.

Butler later described being Moon's personal assistant as demanding work, recalling "what you learnt was what was going on in his mind and tried to be a step or two ahead but he was very unpredictable." He followed Moon to Los Angeles where they lived in the mid-1970s, but found Moon's ability to attract the wrong crowd increasingly problematic. He recalls regularly throwing people out of their house in Trancas and destroying or disposing of drugs before Moon found them. He recalls making Moon's only solo album, Two Sides of the Moon, as a way of keeping them occupied, later describing it as "the most expensive karaoke album ever made". Butler took the only photo of John Lennon and Paul McCartney together in the 1970s (and the last time they would be photographed together) when Moon attended a party at Lennon's beach house in Malibu in April 1974.

Moon's lifestyle eventually became too much for Butler, who phoned up Who manager Bill Curbishley, stating flatly that Moon needed to leave LA immediately. He recalls telling Curbishley "I can't do this anymore and one of us is going to pop our socks and it fucking ain't going to be me." They moved back to London and Butler promptly left Moon's services. Moon died in September 1978.

Butler left the music industry after Moon's death and began to write Full Moon, his account of life with Moon, in 1980 with some friends to help him copyedit. The book was published in 1981 and was a sell-out success in the US. New Musical Express' Andy Gill gave a positive review of the book, noting the clear affection that Butler had for Moon. The book was republished in the early 2000s by Faber and Faber. Butler's second book, Keith Moon: A Personal Portrait was published in 2001 in a limited edition of 2000 copies.
