= Joel Zoss =

American singer, songwriter and author

Joel R. Zoss (born February 19, 1944) is an American singer, guitarist, songwriter and award-winning prose author.

== Biography ==
=== Early years ===
Zoss was born in Easton, Pennsylvania, and at the age of four he moved to Madison, New Jersey, with his family. He attended Montessori School and public kindergarten in Madison and later moved with his family to Berkeley Heights, New Jersey, where he attended Columbia Public School from grades one through seven. He then moved with his family to St. Paul, Minnesota, where he attended Saint Paul Academy, a military day school, for grades eight through ten. He attended the University of Minnesota High School for the first half of eleventh grade, then moved with his family to Providence, Rhode Island, where he completed eleventh grade at Providence's Classical High School. He attended Moses Brown School in Providence for his twelfth year of high school and graduated from the college at the University of Chicago with a B.A. in English in 1966. Zoss' family moved often because his father's professional skills were much in demand.

From the age of about ten, the family returned every summer to Martha's Vineyard, where Zoss participated in the Folk Revival of the 1950s and 1960s, meeting and playing with many of the seminal influences of the day, and began performing with Alex Taylor and his younger brother James Taylor. He has continued to spend time on Martha's Vineyard since childhood.

In the fall of 1966 Zoss began graduate studies in physical anthropology at Columbia University in New York City. In New York he also began working with psychologist Richard Alpert (later aka Ram Dass). Their collaborations led him to various studies outside academia and marked the end of his formal education. In 1967 he left the United States. Based in Spain, for the next several years he lived in European capitals and points around the Mediterranean while focusing on prose fiction. Zoss sold his first short story to New Worlds Magazine in 1968 in London, and later that year sold his first novel, Chronicle, to Jonathan Cape and Harper & Row.

=== Prose and music ===
Zoss' professional life has always balanced between prose and music, sometimes weighted heavily to one or the other, as during the 1980s into the 1990s, when he authored or co-authored over twenty five non-fiction books. These included, with historian John S. Bowman, Diamonds in the Rough (Macmillan 1989), cited by The New York Times as one of the 50 greatest baseball books of all times. Zoss has won several awards for his prose and is an International PEN short story award winner and a National Endowment for the Arts Fellow of Creative Writing (awarded on the basis of his novel Chronicle, published by Simon & Schuster in 1980).

A versatile musician known for mixing metaphysical themes with strong melodies, Zoss gained a worldwide cult following after Bonnie Raitt began recording his songs in the early 1970s. Because of his broad range of styles, his music does not easily fit into any one genre; Zoss has recorded ballads, reggae, blues and other music for several major record labels. His recordings are currently available in the United States on Catalan Records, Rounder, Critique, DM, and through the Smithsonian Institution; and as imports from BMG Arista Japan. His award-winning songs have been covered by many artists on many labels, have sold millions of copies, and have been acquired and licensed by institutions as diverse as MUZAK and the Smithsonian Institution.

=== Debut album ===
Early in the 1970s Zoss performed at Passim (Club 47) in Cambridge. While he was onstage, Bonnie Raitt's manager, Dick Waterman, was in the club trying to get a booking for Raitt. While Waterman and the club owner were discussing the booking, he heard Zoss sing "Too Long at the Fair." After the show Waterman introduced himself and asked for a tape of the song to play for Raitt, who was about to record her second album for Warner Bros. Two songs, "Too Long at the Fair" and "I Gave My Love a Candle," were subsequently recorded by singer Raitt. Both songs also appear on Zoss' eponymous first album, which was recorded in 1974 for Arista Records.

=== Performing and recording ===
Zoss has performed and recorded with many artists including B.B. King, Etta James, James Taylor, David Bromberg, John Hall and Orleans, John Hartford, Juan-Carlos Formell, Paul Butterfield, Bonnie Raitt, David Sanborn, Vassar Clements, Lowell George and Little Feat, Taj Mahal, Norman Blake, Todd Rundgren, Kate Taylor, Howling Wolf, Ferron, June Millington and The Master Musicians of Jajouka.

During 2008 and 2009 Zoss appeared frequently with B.B. King in theaters across the United States. In addition, he has toured extensively throughout the U.S., performing both as a solo artist and also with the Joel Zoss Trio at such venues as The Henry Miller Library in Big Sur, Philadelphia Folk Festival, Max's Kansas City, The Main Point, The Beacon Theatre, The Bottom Line, The Living Room, Club Helsinki, The Cutting Room, The Cellar Door, Passim, Caffe Lena, The Ashgrove, The Bitter End, Folk City, Johnny D's, The Paradise, The Bushnell, The Hooker-Dunham Theatre, The Iron Horse Music Hall, The Keswick Theater, and the Northampton Academy of Music.

As a solo performer and with his trio, guitarist Zoss (who also plays gimbri and oud) performs original compositions and traditional pieces by roots artists such as Elizabeth Cotten, Lead Belly, Big Bill Broonzy, and Robert Johnson. Bassist Guy DeVito, formerly of FAT, Billy Klock, on drums, and Joel on guitar formed the nucleus for the Lila album. Guy DeVito has recorded and performed with his band FAT (Atlantic Recording Corp.] and [RCA) and with Felix Pappalardi, John Kay and Steppenwolf, Matt "Guitar" Murphy, and Stevie Wonder. Drummer Billy Klock is a graduate of the Hartford Conservatory of Music who has kept time and recorded with many major players, including Greg Piccolo and Heavy Juice, formerly of Roomful of Blues.

=== Lila ===
Lila, released in 2008 on Zoss’ Catalan label, has thirteen tracks, all but one of which are original compositions. The exception is "Oh, Babe It Ain't No Lie" (Elizabeth Cotten). "Sarah's Song," was also on his earlier Arista album. The other eleven tracks were: "Oh, Jerusalem;" "Pushing the River;" "Mother Wanted You Home;" "Cantina Bodega;" "Till I Met You;" "Pretty Flowers;" "Touchstone;" "In My Dreams;" "The Token;" "Junkers Blues;" and "‘Tis of Thee." Lila was produced by June Millington, leader of the all-female rock band Fanny.

== Discography ==
- Joel Zoss (1975) Arista
- Lila (2008) Catalan
- "Florida Blues" (2015) Bluzpik

== Selected bibliography ==
=== Author or co-author ===
1. Diamonds in the Rough: The Untold History of Baseball (revised edition with an epilogue by the authors, with John S. Bowman), Bison Books/University of Nebraska Press, 2004.
2. The Pictorial History of Baseball (revised edition, with John S. Bowman), Thunder Bay Press, World Publications Group, 2002.
3. The Nixons of Westfield and Ireland, Modern Memoirs, 1999.
4. Diamonds in the Rough: The Untold History of Baseball, (revised edition, with John S. Bowman), Contemporary Books, 1996.
5. The History of Major League Baseball, (with John S. Bowman) Random House, 1992.
6. Diamonds in the Rough: The Untold History of Baseball, (with John S. Bowman) Macmillan, 1989.
7. Illustrated History of Baseball, (pseudonymously as Alex Chadwick), Crown, 1988.
8. Greatest Moments in Baseball, Exeter, 1987.
9. Texas, Bison Books, 1986.
10. The Pictorial History of Baseball, (with John S. Bowman), W.H. Smith, 1986.
11. The American League, (with John S. Bowman), Bison, 1986.
12. The National League, (with John S. Bowman), W.H. Smith, 1986.
13. Chronicle, A novel: Simon & Schuster, 1980.

=== Contributor or editor ===
1. New Worlds: An Anthology (Edited by Michael Moorcock), 2004. Fiction, “The Valve Transcript.”
2. Modern Social Theory: Roots and Branches, Roxbury Press, 1999.
3. Questioning the Media, Sage Publications, 1995.
4. American Journey: Westward Expansion (CD-ROM), Research Publications International, 1995.
5. Cambridge Dictionary of American Biography, Cambridge University Press, 1995.
6. Who's Who in African-American History, Smithmark, 1994.
7. On the Vineyard II, Simon Press, 1990. Fiction: "A Floating World."
8. The World Almanac Who's Who of Film, World Almanac, 1987.
9. Great Generals of the American Civil War and their Battles, Hamlyn (England), 1986.
10. New England, Longmeadow Press, 1986.
11. History of the U.S. Cavalry, Hamlyn (England), 1985.
12. American Furniture, Exeter, 1985.
13. The Vietnam War: An Almanac, World Almanac, 1985.
14. The Twentieth Century: An Almanac, World Almanac, 1984.
15. Works in Progress #2, Doubleday, 1971.

=== Periodicals ===
1. Integrative Medicine Communications (IMC), Article: “Ulcerative Colitis,” 1999.
2. Currents, Woods Hole Oceanographic Institution (WHOI), Fall 1996. Article: “Fields of Dreams” (self-replenishing oil fields).
3. Currents, Woods Hole Oceanographic Institution (WHOI), Fall 1995. Article: “Summer Fellows by the Sea (summer student fellowship program.
4. The Beat, Vol. 14 No. 3, 1995. Lyric: “Bob Marley International.”
5. Currents, Woods Hole Oceanographic Institution (WHOI), spring 1995. Article: "A Box of Sound" (marine seismology).
6. Rhythms, spring, 1992. Cover article "James Taylor: An Exclusive Interview."
7. Rhythms, winter, 1991. "The Writers Behind the Stars."
8. Fiction: "The Valve Transcript," PEN short story competition winner, 1985, syndicated nationally.
9. New Worlds Number 216 (London, England), September 1979. Fiction: "Flat Face of the Flowering Wood."
10. New Worlds, edited by Michael Moorcock (London, England), 1968. Fiction: "The New Agent."
