= Rebels on Pointe =

- Directed by: Bobbi Jo Hart
- Written by: Bobbi Jo Hart
- Produced by: Bobbi Jo Hart; Robbie Hart
- Starring: Les Ballets Trockadero de Monte Carlo
- Cinematography: Bobbi Jo Hart
- Edited by: Catherine Legault
- Music by: Jann Arden; Corey Hart
- Distributed by: Icarus Films; Documentary Channel
- Release date: March 15, 2017 (Roze Filmdagen)
- Running time: 90 minutes
- Country: Canada
- Language: English

Rebels on Pointe is a Canadian documentary film, directed by Bobbi Jo Hart and released in 2017. The film centres on the drag ballet troupe Les Ballets Trockadero de Monte Carlo.

The film premiered at the Roze Filmdagen festival in March 2017. It was screened at several other film festivals before being broadcast by the Canadian Broadcasting Corporation's Documentary Channel in 2018.

The film won the award for Best Canadian Feature at the Inside Out Film and Video Festival in 2017. It received a Canadian Screen Award nomination for Best Biography or Arts Documentary Program or Series at the 7th Canadian Screen Awards in 2019.
