= Two Sides of the Moon =

1975 album by Keith Moon

Studio album by Keith Moon
- Released: March 1975
- Recorded: August–December 1974
- Studio: Record Plant Studios (Los Angeles)
- Genres: Rock; pop
- Length: 29:02
- Labels: MCA/Polydor (1975); Repertoire (1997); Sanctuary (2006)
- Producers: Keith Moon; Mal Evans; Skip Taylor; John Stronach; Steve Cropper

Singles from Two Sides of the Moon
- 1. "Don't Worry Baby" Released: 28 September 1974; 2. "Solid Gold" Released: March 1975; 3. "Crazy Like a Fox" Released: 1975

Two Sides of the Moon is the only solo studio album by the English rock musician Keith Moon, drummer for the Who. It peaked at No. 155 on the Billboard 200. The album title was credited to Ringo Starr. Rather than using the album as a chance to showcase his drumming skill, Moon sang lead vocals on all tracks, and played drums only on three of the tracks ("Crazy Like a Fox", "The Kids Are Alright" and "Move Over Ms. L"), although he played percussion on "Don't Worry Baby". The album features contributions from Ringo Starr, Harry Nilsson, Joe Walsh of the Eagles, Jim Keltner, Bobby Keys, Klaus Voormann, John Sebastian, Flo & Eddie (Mark Volman and Howard Kaylan of the Turtles), Spencer Davis, Dick Dale, Suzi Quatro's sister Patti Quatro, Patti's bandmates from Fanny Jean Millington, Cam Davis, and Nickey Barclay, and future actor Miguel Ferrer.

== Background ==
Moon was the last member of the Who to release a solo album. By this point, John Entwistle had released Smash Your Head Against the Wall (1971; with Moon playing percussion and singing backing vocals), Roger Daltrey released his hit album Daltrey (1973), and Pete Townshend had produced several Meher Baba tribute albums and the demo compilation Who Came First (1972).

Moon had moved into the Beverly Wilshire Hotel with assistant Dougal Butler in March 1974, to play on the sessions for Harry Nilsson's Pussy Cats. The album was produced by John Lennon. Lennon and Nilsson had been ejected from the Troubadour for drunkenly heckling a Smothers Brothers performance several days before Moon's arrival. Moon, Lennon and Nilsson, along with Ringo Starr (who also drummed on Pussy Cats), Lennon's girlfriend May Pang, bassist Klaus Voormann, Voormann's girlfriend Cynthia Webb, and Starr's manager Hilary Gerrard, moved together into a Santa Monica beach house for three weeks. The sessions were affected by Lennon, Nilsson, Moon and Starr's excessive lifestyles and drug abuse, ultimately prompting Lennon to relocate the sessions to New York City.

At the time of Moon's arrival, Lennon had made initial recordings for Rock 'n' Roll (1975) with Phil Spector, and David Bowie and Bryan Ferry had also released cover albums; Bowie's Pin Ups (1973) notably included two songs by the Who, "I Can't Explain" and "Anyway, Anyhow, Anywhere". Encountering the Beatles' former road manager Mal Evans on the Sunset Strip, Moon suggested that Evans produce a solo album for him.

== Recording ==
The first song, a cover version of the Beach Boys' "Don't Worry Baby", was recorded in late March at the Record Plant Studios. The musicians included John Sebastian, Howard Kaylan and Mark Volman, Jesse Ed Davis, and Miguel Ferrer playing drums. Kaylan described the album as "a fantasy record for him", allowing him to live out his fantasy to "be a Beach Boy". For this reason, Moon largely avoided playing the drums, as he considered drumming his "job". Moon left Los Angeles on 19 April to begin filming Tommy, and after the filming concluded, unofficially relocated to California in August 1974, to work on the studio album.

The album was funded by a recording contract directly with Los Angeles' MCA Records arranged by Bill Curbishley and Peter Rudge. Funding was unavailable from London due to Track Records' legal problems with former Who managers Kit Lambert and Chris Stamp, and Moon's extravagant spending habits made labels reluctant to fund the sessions. Biographer Tony Fletcher expresses astonishment that MCA approved the album's recording and released the "travesty of a Beach Boys cover" as a single rather than rejecting the master tapes for "Don't Worry Baby".

The sessions for Two Sides of the Moon were affected by the "lazy and decadent self-indulgence" of mid-1970s Los Angeles' "superstar scene". Nickey Barclay of Fanny remembered the sessions fondly, but additionally described the events that transpired as "pure and simple rock and roll anarchy". Inconsistent working hours and substance abuse slowed down the sessions considerably. The atmosphere of the studio resembled that of a club. Engineer Gary Ladinsky recalled: "You'd get something done for an hour, and then it's a party scene. Eventually, you clear out the studio and you might do something for another half an hour, and then people wander out, and you realise, 'I guess the session is over.'"

After "Teenage Idol", with Dick Dale guesting on guitar, was delivered to MCA, Evans was fired. Fletcher attributes this to Moon's realisation that the sessions were largely fruitless and Evans' own drinking problem was worsening. Skip Taylor replaced him as producer. Volman and engineer John Stronach described Taylor as the main provider of drugs for the sessions. Taylor did not dispute the assessment: "I would go in and decide, is this a night where we should have a little brandy, or should we smoke some stuff, or should we put a couple of lines out?"

Most of the musicians involved saw no real difference as a result of the change. Kaylan commented that after recording his parts twice, "Basically it was the same record." Joe Walsh, then recording So What with Stronach at the Record Plant, was brought in to play additional guitar on "The Kids Are Alright" late in the sessions. He described the results as "semi-train wrecks" and expressed surprise that Moon had only used two producers since he would "fry" anyone who worked with him.

Moon's contributions to the album were primarily vocals. He only played drums on three songs, simultaneously accompanied by session drummers. Stronach said that the sessions had two drummers: "One to keep time and then Keith to play over it." The first set of vocals recorded with Evans, done while Moon was drunk, was discarded. Taylor characterised them as "a guy from England trying to sound like a guy from Nashville but having about five belts before he did it." Taylor demanded that Moon abandon the country twang in which he had sung the early songs (and which is noticeable on outtakes such as "I'm Not Angry"), and sing in the posh British accent he regularly mimicked.

Fletcher comments that so many musicians were brought in to try to "salvage" the record (sixty being credited on the final album, with several others such as Brian Wilson having been rumoured to have contributed as well) that it resulted in Moon sounding more like "the guest on someone else's record".

Moon's behaviour during the sessions reflected his self-destructive lifestyle and worsening health. Stronach recalled, "He'd come in, reach into his pockets, and there'd be pills and cocaine falling out." Moon had previously been able to sing adequately on several songs from the A Quick One (1966), Ready Steady Who (1966), The Who Sell Out (1967) and Quadrophenia (1973) sessions. His strained and frequently off-key vocals on Two Sides of the Moon contributed to feelings of inadequacy and depression throughout recording. Recording vocals one night in Studio B under a low ceiling covered in spotlights, he smashed a light bulb with an ashtray every time recording was stopped because he failed to hit a note. He ended up destroying the entire light fixture.

MCA's then-president Mike Maitland told Taylor at their first meeting that a lot of money had been invested before he assumed production duties, and that MCA was "prepared to spend an enormous sum of money in promotion and marketing". This was exactly what happened: Fletcher states that "well over $200,000" was spent for "recording costs alone", and that Moon claimed to receive a non-returnable advance for the same amount.

With the album being prepared for release in 1975, MCA initially refused to pay for the elaborate sleeve designed by Gary Stromberg. Moon, Taylor and Stronach went to meet with Maitland. Moon asked Taylor to stop in front of an Army and Navy store on the way, and returned with a fire axe, which he kept hidden on himself. Maitland once again denied their sleeve request, criticising them for the excessive cost of the album. Moon responded by placing himself directly in front of Maitland and held the fire axe above Maitland's mahogany partners desk, and said, "What's it going to be, dear boy? My album cover or a new desk?"

== Content ==
Originally recorded for his own album, but not released on it, John Lennon gave Moon the track "Move Over Ms. L" and later did his own version. "Solid Gold", written by keyboardist Nickey Barclay, was originally recorded by her band Fanny.

Vinyl pressings of the Two Sides of the Moon had text etched into the run-out groove of side 1 that read "Grown Men Did This". The record itself was contained in an elaborate reversible inner sleeve that, when flipped, changed the front cover to show Moon's buttocks hanging from the limousine window, forming a pun on his name. Upon release, Moon subsequently started work on a second solo studio album, which was never completed. Two Sides of the Moon was re-released by Repertoire Records in 1997, including the finished songs that Moon had made for his second album. Two Sides of the Moon was again re-released by Castle Music and Sanctuary Records in July 2006, as a two-disc Deluxe Edition, featuring the original 10 songs plus 41 bonus tracks. 9788512

== Critical reception ==
Professional ratings
Review scores
Source	Rating
AllMusic	link
Christgau's Record Guide	B
Rolling Stone	(negative) link
PopMatters	5/10 stars

Reviewing in Christgau's Record Guide: Rock Albums of the Seventies (1981), Robert Christgau said "It's hard to imagine the auteur of this alternately vulgar, silly, and tender travesty/tour de force as anyone but Keith Moon; his madness translates not only to film (Stardust, Tommy) but even to the supersolo studio jobs that this parodies so deliciously. I presume they thought it was funny to mix the backup singers (Nilsson, Nelson, Flo & Eddie) up in front of the guy with his name on the cover. And it was."

In a review for AllMusic, Steve Leggett said the album was "so fascinatingly bad that it has assumed a certain cult status" but was nevertheless "a horrible album on all counts".

The album was included in a list of 12 ill-advised solo albums, in an article produced by the NME in 2009.

== Track listing ==
Side one

1. "Crazy Like a Fox" (Al Staehely) – 2:07
2. "Solid Gold" (Nickey Barclay) – 2:48
3. "Don't Worry Baby" (Brian Wilson, Roger Christian) – 3:31
4. "One Night Stand" (Dennis Larden) – 3:36
5. "The Kids Are Alright" (Pete Townshend) – 3:03

Side two

1. "Move Over Ms. L" (John Lennon) – 3:10
2. "Teen Age Idol" (Jack Lewis) – 2:20
3. "Back Door Sally" (John Marascalco) – 2:31
4. "In My Life" (Lennon-McCartney) – 2:43
5. "Together" (Harry Nilsson, Keith Moon, Richard Starkey) – 3:05

1997 bonus tracks

11. "U.S. Radio Spot" (Moon, Richard Starkey)
12. "I Don't Suppose" (Nickey Barclay)
13. "Naked Man" (Randy Newman)
14. "Do Me Good" (Steve Cropper)
15. "Real Emotion" (Steve Cropper)
16. "Don't Worry Baby" - U.S. single A-side (Brian Wilson, Roger Christian)
17. "Teenage Idol" - U.S. single B-side (Jack Lewis)
18. "Together 'Rap'" (Harry Nilsson, Moon, Richard Starkey)

=== 2006 deluxe edition ===
==== Disc one ====
The original 1975 album

1. "Crazy Like a Fox" (Staehely)
2. "Solid Gold" (Barclay)
3. "Don't Worry Baby" (Wilson, Christian)
4. "One Night Stand" (Larden)
5. "The Kids Are Alright" (Townshend)
6. "Move Over Ms. L" (Lennon)
7. "Teenage Idol" (Lewis)
8. "Back Door Sally" (Marascalco)
9. "In My Life" (Lennon–McCartney)
10. "Together" (Nilsson, Moon, Starkey)

Outtakes from the album

11. "Lies" (Buddy Randell, Beau Charles)
12. "I Don't Suppose" (Nickey Barclay)
13. "Hot Rod Queen" (Jimmy Webb)

The original 1974 U.S. single

14. "Don't Worry Baby" (Wilson, Christian)
15. "Teenage Idol" (Lewis)

The Mal Evans mixes

16. "Back Door Sally" (Marascalco)
17. "One Night Stand" (Larden)
18. "Crazy Like a Fox" (Staehely)
19. "In My Life" (Lennon–McCartney)
20. "Move Over Ms. L" (Lennon)
21. "Solid Gold" (Barclay)

The Unreleased Xmas '74 Single

22. "We Wish You a Merry Xmas" (Traditional)

The 1975 Clover masters

23. "Do Me Good" (Cropper)
24. "Real Emotion" (Cropper)
25. "Naked Man" (Randy Newman)

==== Disc two ====
Record Plant, Los Angeles, August – November 1974

1. "Keith & Ringo 'Together' session dialogue #1"
2. "Don't Worry Baby" - John Sebastian guide vocal (Wilson, Christian)
3. "Don't Worry Baby" - Keith lead vocal (Wilson, Christian)
4. "Teenage Idol" (Jack Lewis)
5. "Crazy Like a Fox" (Staehely)
6. "Solid Gold" (Barclay)
7. "A Touch of the Moon Madness" - link piece
8. "Move Over Ms. L" (Lennon)
9. "Lies" (Buddy Randell, Beau Charles)
10. "My Generation" (Townshend)
11. "The Kids Are Alright" (Townshend)
12. "Keith & Ringo 'Together' session dialogue #2"
13. "Together" - take one (Nilsson, Moon, Starkey)
14. "Together" - Keith & Ringo vocals (Nilsson, Moon, Starkey)
15. "Together" - Harry Nilsson ending tag (Nilsson, Moon, Starkey)
16. "I'm Not Angry" (Jimmy Howard)
17. "Hot Rod Queen" (Jimmy Webb)
18. "Solid Gold Ad-libs #1"
19. "Teenage Idol" (Lewis)
20. "Solid Gold Ad-libs #2"

Clover Recorders, Los Angeles, August 1975

21. "Real Emotion" (Cropper)
22. "OK Mr. Starkey" - Do Me Good session chat
23. "Do Me Good" (Cropper)

And finally...

24. "Keith & Ringo – Together (Again)" - Record Plant session (Nilsson, Moon, Starkey)
25. "In My Life" - Record Plant session – Keith solo (Lennon–McCartney)

Hidden tracks:

26a. "U.S. (MCA) radio spot for Two Sides of the Moon" (1:03)
26b. "Polydor radio spot for Two Sides of the Moon" (0:29)
26c. "Generic radio spot for Two Sides of the Moon" (0:46)
26d. "The Kids Are Alright [drum solo]" (Townshend) (1:13)

== Personnel ==
Musicians

- Keith Moon – drums, percussion, vocals
- Ringo Starr, Ricky Nelson, Harry Nilsson – vocals
- Spencer Davis, Jesse Ed Davis, John Staehely, Beau Guss, Patti Quatro, Danny Kortchmar, James Haymer, John Sebastian, Steve Adamick, Al Staehely, Mike Condello, Paul Lenart – guitar
- Joe Walsh – guitar, ARP synthesizer
- Dick Dale – surf guitar on "Teenage Idol"
- Skip Edwards – steel guitar, Fender Rhodes electric piano
- Jimmie Randall, Paul Stallworth, Jean Millington, David Birkett, Klaus Voormann – bass guitar
- Jay Ferguson, Nickey Barclay, Blair Aaronson, David Foster – piano
- Norman Kurban – piano, organ
- William "Curly" Smith, Cam Davis, Miguel Ferrer, Mickey McGee, Ron Grinel, Jim Keltner, Ringo Starr – drums
- Robert Greenidge – steel drums on "Together"
- Steve Douglas, Ollie Mitchell – horns on "Move Over Ms. L" and "Back Door Sally"
- Bobby Keys – saxophone on "Back Door Sally"
- Julia Tillman, Lorna Willard, Sherlie Matthews, Fanny, Clydie King, Howard Kaylan, Jim Gilstrap, Mark Volman, Flo & Eddie, Jay DeWitt White, Dennis Larden, Andra Willis, Augie Johnson, Carolyn Willis, Gerald Garrett, Gregory Matta, Ira Hawkins, Irma Routen, Ron Hicklin, Cam Davis – backing vocals
- David Bowie – vocal contribution on "Real Emotion"
- Jimmie Haskell – string arrangements, conductor
- Mal Evans – horn arrangement on "Move Over Ms. L"

Technical

- Don Wood, Gary Kellgren, Gary Ladinsky, John Stronach, Lee Kiefer, Michael Verdick, Mike Stone – engineer
- Bruce Reiley, Gary Stromberg, John Stronach, Keith Moon, Skip Taylor – cover concept
- George Osaki – art direction
- Jim McCrary, Robert Failla – photography

=== Session information ===
Credits taken from the inner sleeve of the vinyl release.

"Crazy Like a Fox"

- Written by Al Staehely
- Keith Moon - lead vocals, drums
- Curly Smith - drums
- Jimmie Randall - bass
- Spencer Davis and Al Staehely - acoustic guitars
- John Staehely and Jesse Ed Davis - electric guitars
- Jay Ferguson - piano
- Sherlie Matthews, Lorna Willard, Julia Tillman - backing vocals

"Solid Gold"

- Written by Nickey Barclay
- Keith Moon - lead vocals
- Ringo Starr - "announcer"
- Cam Davis - drums
- Paul Stallingworth and Jean Millington - bass
- Nickey Barclay - piano
- Patti Quatro - guitar
- Joe Walsh - guitar, ARP synthesizer
- Beau Guss - guitar solo
- Sherlie Matthews, Lorna Willard, Julia Tillman, Fanny - backing vocals

"Don't Worry Baby"

- Written by Brian Wilson and Roger Christian
- String arrangement and conducting by Jimmy Haskell
- Keith Moon - lead vocals, percussion
- Miguel Ferrer - drums
- Paul Stallingworth - bass
- John Sebastian, Steve Adamick, Danny Kortchmar, Jesse Ed Davis, James Haymer - acoustic guitars
- Norman Kurban - organ
- Blair Aaronson - piano
- Sherlie Matthews, James Gilstrap, Clydie King, Flo & Eddie - backing vocals

"One Night Stand"

- Written by Dennis Larden
- Keith Moon and Rick Nelson - co-lead vocal
- Mickey McGee - drums
- David Birkett - bass
- Mike Condello and Al Staehely - acoustic guitars
- Joe Walsh - electric guitar
- Skip Edwards - Fender Rhodes, pedal steel guitar
- Dennis Larden, Jay White, Flo & Eddie - backing vocals

"The Kids Are Alright"

- Written by Pete Townshend
- String arrangement and conducting by Jimmy Haskell
- Keith Moon - lead vocals, drums, drum solo
- Curly Smith - drums
- Jimmie Randall - bass
- Al Staehely - acoustic guitar
- John Staehely - electric guitar
- Joe Walsh - electric guitar, ARP synthesizer
- Jay Ferguson - piano
- Flo & Eddie - backing vocals

"Move Over Ms. L"

- Written by John Lennon
- Horn arrangement by Mal Evans
- Keith Moon - lead vocals, drums
- Ron Grinel - drums
- Paul Stallingworth - bass
- Joe Walsh - lead guitar
- Jesse Ed Davis - guitar
- David Foster - piano
- Ollie Mitchell, Steve Douglas - horns

"Teenage Idol"

- Written by Jack Lewis
- String arrangement and conducting by Jimmy Haskell
- Keith Moon - lead vocals
- Jim Keltner - drums
- Paul Stallingworth - bass
- Dick Dale - surf guitar and solo
- Dan Kortchmar - acoustic guitar
- Jesse Ed Davis - electric guitar
- Norman Kurban - piano
- Jay White, Dennis Larden - backing vocals

"Back Door Sally"

- Written by John Marascalco
- Keith Moon - lead vocals
- Curly Smith - drums
- Jimmie Randall - bass
- Al Staehely, Joe Walsh - electric guitar
- Jay Ferguson, Blair Aaronson - piano
- Bobby Keys - sax solo
- Ollie Mitchell, Steve Douglas - horns
- Flo & Eddie - backing vocals

"In My Life"

- Written by John Lennon and Paul McCartney
- String arrangement and conducting by Jimmy Haskell
- Keith Moon - lead vocals
- Norman Kurban - piano
- Choir:

Gerald Garrett
James Gilstrap
Ira Hawkins
Ron Hicklin
August Johnson
Clydie King
Greg Matta
Irma Routen
Julia Tillman
Lorna Willard
Andra Willis
Carolyn Willis

"Together"

- Written by Harry Nilsson
- String arrangement and conducting by Jimmy Haskell
- Keith Moon - lead vocals
- Ringo Starr - drums and "rap"
- Jim Keltner - drums
- Klaus Voormann - bass
- Jesse Ed Davis, Danny Kortchmar, Paul Lenart - guitars
- Robert Greenidge - steel drums
- Harry Nilsson - backing vocals
