= Nickey Barclay =

American singer, songwriter and musician

- Born: 1951 (age 74–75)
- Genres: Rock
- Instruments: Piano, Hammond organ
- Years active: 1969–1976
- Labels: Reprise, Casablanca, Ariola
- Website: www.fannyrocks.com/the-way-it-was/nickey/

Nicole Barclay (born 1951) is an American singer, songwriter and musician. She was a member of the all-female rock group Fanny and has collaborated with Joe Cocker, Barbra Streisand and Keith Moon.

== Career ==
In the late 1960s, Barclay joined the collective of session musicians known as the Musicians Contact Service in Los Angeles. In January 1970, she was asked to join the all-female rock group Fanny as a singer and keyboardist. She was one of the main songwriters and lead singers in the group, and appeared on all their albums, adding soul, blues and funk influences to the group's overall sound.

After joining Joe Cocker for a few months on his March 1970 US tour as a backing vocalist, during which she was recorded for the live album Mad Dogs and Englishmen, Barclay returned to Fanny. She played on Barbra Streisand's 1971 album, Stoney End and along with the other members of Fanny, performed on the follow-up Barbra Joan Streisand.

Barclay left Fanny at the end of 1974, shortly before the band split up. Her song "Solid Gold", first appearing on Fanny's 1973 album Mothers Pride, was re-recorded by Keith Moon for his 1975 solo album, Two Sides of the Moon; Barclay also played keyboards on the album. The following year, she released a solo album Diamond in a Junkyard, which was commercially unsuccessful.

After Diamond in a Junkyard, Barclay semi-retired from the music business and moved to the United Kingdom. In the 1980s, she formed the Nickey Barclay Band, performing in venues around London with former Rory Gallagher sidemen Wilgar Campbell on drums, Lou Martin on keyboards, Pete Bingham on bass and ex-Procol Harum guitarist Dave Ball.

Barclay appears in archival footage in the 2021 documentary film Fanny: The Right to Rock, directed by Bobbi Jo Hart. The film presents a history of the band including Barclay's participation.

== Personal life ==
Shortly after leaving Fanny, Barclay came out as bisexual. She is one of three LGBT members of the band's original lineup, as lead guitarist June Millington and drummer Alice de Buhr are both gay.

== Discography ==
- Diamond in a Junkyard (1976)
