= A. O. Zoss =

American engineer

A. O. Zoss was an American engineer, having been elected a Fellow of the American Association for the Advancement of Science in 1951. He worked as a technical advisor to US occupation forces in Germany immediately after World War II.
