= Fanny: The Right to Rock =

2021 Canadian documentary film

- Film poster
- Directed by: Bobbi Jo Hart
- Written by: Bobbi Jo Hart
- Produced by: Bobbi Jo Hart; Robbie Hart
- Starring: Fanny
- Cinematography: Claire Sanford; Sam Trudelle; Naomi Ture
- Edited by: Catherine Legault
- Music by: Daniel Toussaint
- Production company: Adobe Productions International
- Distributed by: Blue Ice Docs
- Release date: April 29, 2021 (Hot Docs)
- Running time: 92 minutes
- Country: Canada
- Language: English

Fanny: The Right to Rock is a Canadian documentary film, directed by Bobbi Jo Hart and released in 2021.

== Outline ==
The film is a profile of Fanny, an all-female rock band from the 1970s whose members included lesbian music pioneer June Millington. Hart uses more than 80 photographs taken by bandmates’ friend Linda Wolf "to illustrate their unbridled woman power — a tangle of hair, bodies, and a baby — under the roof of Fanny Hill, a house in L.A. that Millington calls a sorority with amps.”

The film premiered at the 2021 Hot Docs Canadian International Documentary Festival, where it was named one of five winners of the Rogers Audience Award. It was subsequently screened at the 2021 Inside Out Film and Video Festival, where it won the award for Best Canadian Film.

== Cast ==
- Fanny as themselves
- June Millington as self
- Jean Millington as self
- Brie Howard-Darling as self
- Kirk Pasich as self
- Dave Darling as self
- Lee Madeloni as self
- Scott Millington as self
- Linda Wolf as self

== Reception ==
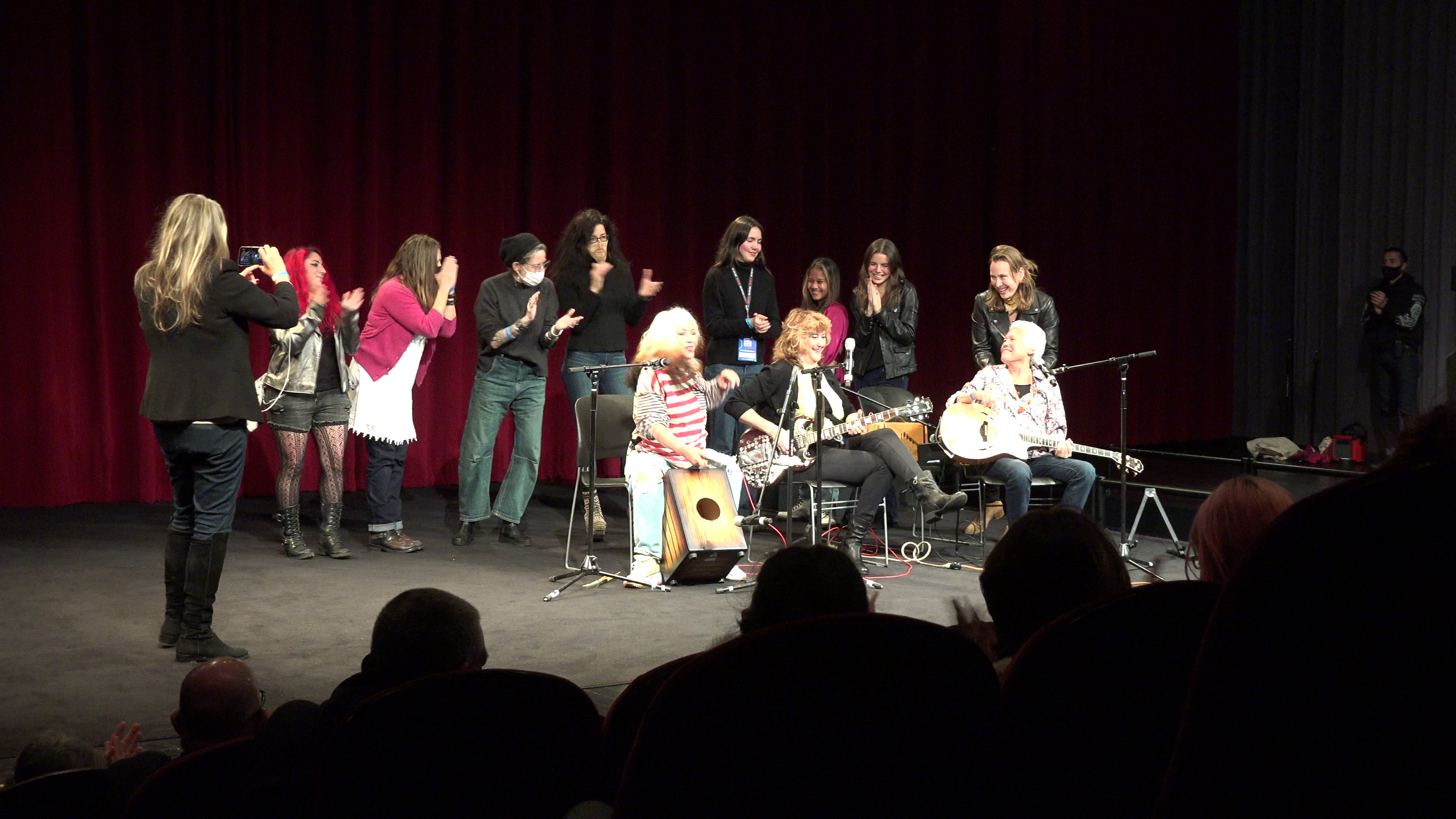
Photo from the film's preview in New York City in 2021

Dennis Harvey of Variety wrote "Fanny: The Right to Rock remains thoroughly engaging thanks to the demonstrable talent and brassy forthrightness of its central personalities". Sydney Urbanek of The Spool said "The beauty of Fanny: The Right to Rock is that it's being released now-long enough since their peak that the band can tell their story on their own terms, and early enough that they're very much around to receive their long-overdue flowers". Susan G. Cole of Point of View magazine generally praised the film but noted some omissions, such as Fanny's collaborations with other musicians or their influence on the Riot grrrl movement. John Doyle of The Globe and Mail called it "terrific and eye-opening".
