= ZOS Messaging Service =

ZOS Messaging Service (ZMS) is a location communication standard that operates over cellular network. ZMS uses standardized communications protocols and IP Networks to allow the exchange of geo coordinates between mobile phones, and between mobile telephone devices and personal computers.

ZMS enables developers of location-based service (LBS) applications to access multiple device platforms. The standard also opens the location-based advertising (LBA) market to create new advertising channels. ZMS was developed by ZOS Communications in 2007. Its first use was in the mobile peer-to-peer location application zhiing.

== End user and enterprise uses ==
=== End user ===
The end user software, known as zhiing manager, works to connect people in three ways. Either people-to-people, people-to-places, or people-to-services.

=== Enterprise ===
The ZMS standard may be implemented outside of the smartphone-based zhiing manager. Organizations may stay aware of a device's location, and dispatch the closest device to a given address. The enterprise software differs from the end user software in that location can be constantly updated to the ZOS servers, and can be shared the client organization. This allows for efficient allocation of resources, whether the solution is focusing on taxis, EMS, Sales and Service organizations, advertising, or other uses.
