= Bobbi Jo Hart =

Canadian documentary filmmaker

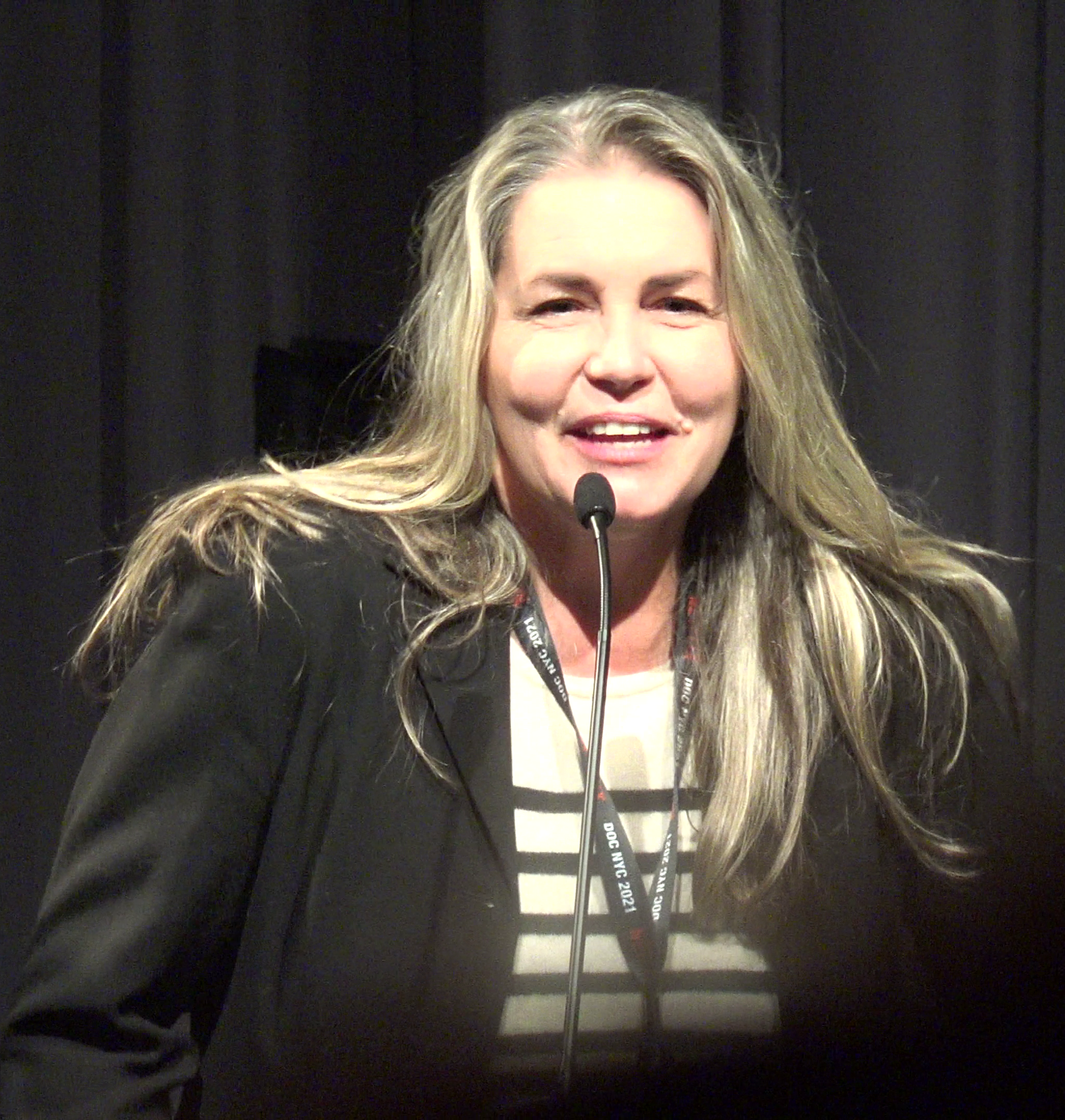
- Born: 22 January 1966 (age 59); Los Angeles, California
- Occupation: Documentary Filmmaker

Bobbi Jo Hart (née Krals) is an American-Canadian documentary filmmaker based in Montreal, Quebec. Hart was born in California and raised in Cottage Grove, Oregon. She is most noted for her films Rebels on Pointe, which won the award for Best Canadian Feature at the Inside Out Film and Video Festival in 2017 and received a Canadian Screen Award nomination for Best Biography or Arts Documentary Program or Series at the 7th Canadian Screen Awards in 2019, and Fanny: The Right to Rock, which won the Rogers Audience Award at the Hot Docs Canadian International Documentary Festival and the award for Best Canadian Film at Inside Out in 2021.

Her other films have included A Calling to Care (2001), She Got Game (2003), I Am Not a Rock Star (2012) and Rise (2015).
