= June Millington =

American musician, songwriter, and producer (born 1948)

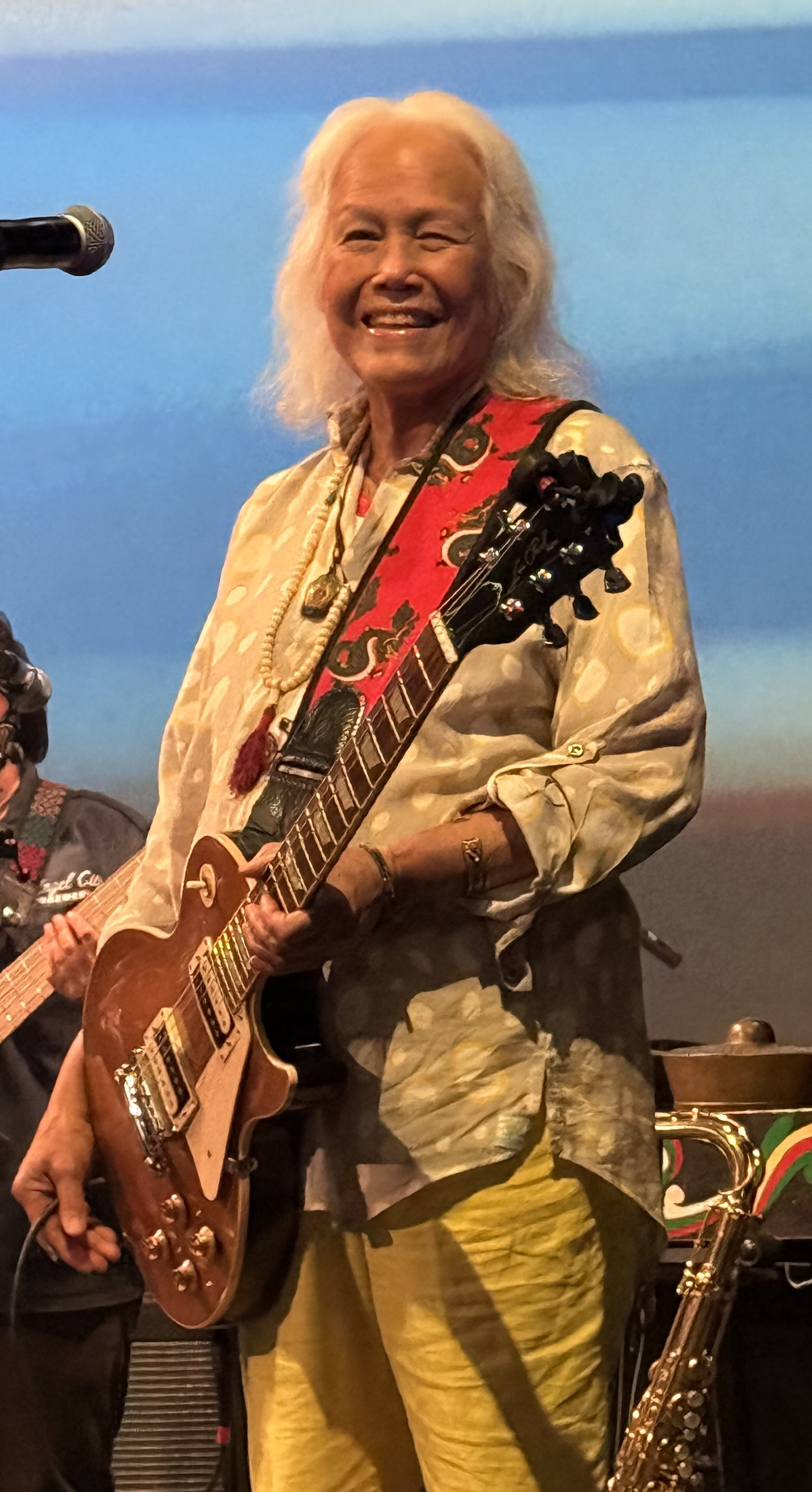
- Millington performing in 2025 at the Howard Theater

Background information
- Born: June Elizabeth Millington; April 14, 1948 (age 78); Manila, Philippines
- Genres: Rock, pop, blues rock
- Occupations: Musician; songwriter; producer; instructor
- Instruments: Guitar, vocals
- Years active: 1965–present
- Labels: Reprise; Olivia; United Artists; Fabulous; Slick Music; Rhino
- Formerly of: The Svelts; Wild Honey; Fanny; Smile

June Elizabeth Millington (born April 14, 1948) is a Filipino-American guitarist, songwriter, producer, educator, and actress.

Millington was the founder of the music groups the Svelts and Wild Honey, before becoming co-founder and lead guitarist of the all-female rock band Fanny, which was active from 1970 to 1974. Millington has been called "a godmother of women's music", and is the co-founder and artistic director of the Institute for the Musical Arts (IMA) in Goshen, Massachusetts.

== Early life ==
June Elizabeth Millington was born in Manila, the Philippines, on April 14, 1948, the eldest of the seven children of Filipina socialite "Yola" Yolanda Leonor Limjoco Millington, and former United States Navy Lt. Commander John "Jack" Howard Millington. He had graduated from the United States Naval Academy in 1939, and was a son of Professor Howard G. Millington, a noted folklorist. June Millington's parents were married in Manila in May 1947, and divorced in California in March 1970. Millington is the older sister of bassist Jean Y. Millington Adamian.

=== Philippines ===
Until they moved to the United States in 1961, Jack and Yola Millington and their children lived luxuriously with Yola's parents Angel Limjoco and Felisa Limjoco (née Lejano) in various Manila locations, including at 56 R. Pascual Street, San Juan (then part of Rizal province); in the Wack Wack Golf and Country Club in Mandaluyong; near the old American School in Pasay; and on N. Domingo Street, San Juan; and for several months just before they emigrated at the Howell Compound in Quezon City. Additionally, during 1953, Millington and her family lived for a year in Baguio with her grandparents.

At the age of eight, Millington began playing piano to entertain her family, and later listened to music on the radio and attempted to play along on ukulele. Her family encouraged her to sing and play ukulele at gatherings.

Millington and her siblings attended the American School, then located in Donada Street in Pasay in Manila. She later recalled: "the racism we encountered at the American School was crushing." By 1960 Millington transferred to the Assumption Convent school located in Makati, Metro Manila. Early in 1961, when Millington was in the seventh grade, she heard a girl play the guitar, which jump-started her interest in the instrument.

On her 13th birthday, Millington was given a small, hand-made, mother-of-pearl inlaid guitar by her mother.

=== United States ===
Three weeks later, in May 1961, the Millington family left the Philippines for the United States on the SS President Cleveland. While on board ship, Millington switched from playing the ukulele to acoustic guitar. On June 22, 1961, the Millington family arrived in the U.S., and then settled in Sacramento, California.

Millington recalled: "We always felt like "other", never quite fitting in, both in Manila and Sacramento. Being both biracial and bicultural was a really really tough slot in the '50s into the '60s, our formative teenage years." In an attempt to become more popular and make friends, in 1962, Millington and her sister Jean wrote their first song "Angel in White", followed by "Miss Wallflower '62", which they sang with two other girls on their ukuleles at their junior high school variety show. Millington recalled that afterwards, "Kids started coming up to us and telling us they liked it. So it dawned on us this was a way to make friends." In 1962, Millington and her sister Jean began to sing folk songs together as an acoustic duo at hootenannies and similar events, including the songs of Peter, Paul and Mary and other artists featured on the television program Hootenanny.

Later in 1962, Millington and her sister Jean enrolled in the class of 1966 at C. K. McClatchy High School. During 1963, Millington was a member of a YWCA conference group of senior high school students chosen to visit the California State Legislature. While students at McClatchy, the Millington sisters formed a band with Zenaida "Zenny" Prodon, an American Field Service exchange student from Meycauayan Institute High School (now Meycauayan College) in Meycauayan, Bulacan, Philippines.

== Musical career and biography ==
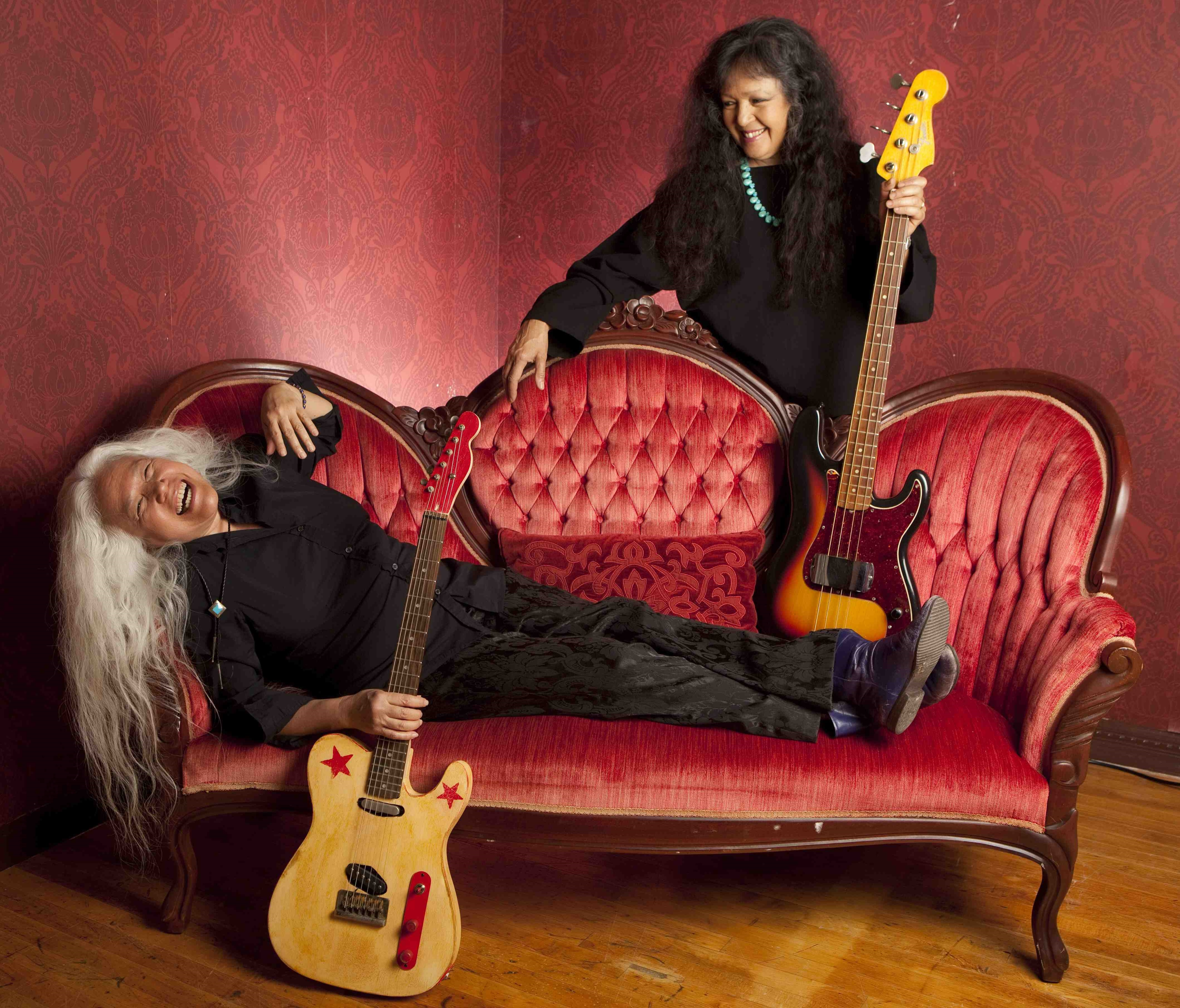
June (pictured left) with Jean Millington in 2011

=== 1965–1968: The Svelts ===
With her mother's assistance, but against her father's wishes, in late 1964, Millington switched from acoustic guitar to electric guitar and bass after a girl from another school who played drums [Kathy Terry] asked if Millington and her sister Jean would like to start a band. Millington recalled in 2013:

We were like, "Yeah, okay!" My dad took me to a pawn shop and got me a Sears Roebuck guitar with a little matching amp. That was my first rig–a complete and total thrill. Jean and I flipped a coin to see who would play bass in the band. (laughs) I won, so I got to stay on guitar. We learned to play by listening to the radio and by hanging out with boys who were in bands. We were 15 or 16 at the time.

By early 1965, Millington and her sister Jean formed the Svelts, an all-female rock band, with June on rhythm guitar, Jean on bass, Kathy Terry on drums, and Cathy Carter on guitar. According to Millington, the band's name, "came from a word my brother had just learned in school. To be svelte: thin, lithe. It sounded like what we wanted to be, kinda classy!" The Svelts rehearsed initially in Terry's living room in Sacramento. Managed and promoted by Richard "Dick" Leventon, the Svelts performed at sock hops, air force bases, and frat parties and gradually built a following. In November 2012, Millington recalled:

Was it hard? Hell, yeah. Girls weren't supposed to go electric, so the resistance was incredible at first. Was it fun? You bet. By keeping our grades up at school, we began to lead successful double lives as Philippine-American girls by day, budding rockers at night, except we didn't do rock as much as we did girl group songs and Motown, which meant "He's So Fine" and "Heatwave," with "The Night Before" and "You Really Got Me" thrown in. If people danced to it, we did it. They were all great songs to cut your teeth on and learn compositionally.

Later, Terry was replaced on drums by Filipino American Brie Berry, who was a student at Folsom High School (class of 1967). Before their senior year, Millington and her sister Jean performed during the summer of 1965 as a duo. In September 1965, they copyrighted their song "Footloose and Fancy-Free".

After graduation from high school in 1966, Millington enrolled at the University of California, Davis, where, hoping to become a surgeon, she majored in premedical studies with a minor in music. However, after a year, Millington decided to suspend her studies to focus on her musical career.

After a number of personnel changes, including five different drummers, the Millington sisters were joined in 1968 by lead guitarist Adrienne "Addie" Lee Clement (from the Palo Alto band California Girls), recent graduate of Cubberley High School; and drummer Alice Monroe de Buhr who had moved to California at age 17, after the divorce of her parents, in search of fame and fortune. In this four-piece configuration, the Svelts gigged around the West in a renovated Greyhound bus, mainly playing cover songs. By early 1967, the Svelts (Millington, Wendy Haas, Brie Berry, and Jean Millington) had a band house in Los Altos, where they lived and rehearsed.

In 1967, Millington enrolled at the University of California, Berkeley, where she continued her premed studies for two quarters. However, after playing in clubs on the US West Coast and Nevada, Berry, who had married Michael Brandt, left the band because of pregnancy, and subsequently became the mother of Brandi Angela Brandt.

=== 1968–1969: Wild Honey ===
While Millington attended classes, Clement and de Buhr toured as the Svelts, but later decided to rename the band Wild Honey, and gigged briefly in the Midwest before returning to California. In 1968, Clement and de Buhr invited Millington and her sister Jean to join Wild Honey. Consequently, Millington decided to terminate her university studies to become a full-time musician. Wild Honey played folk songs, Motown covers, and some of their own songs, and played with Creedence Clearwater Revival, the Youngbloods, and the Turtles at fairs and private parties, and auditioned at the Fillmore West with the Doors.

Hoping to secure a recording contract, in April 1969, Wild Honey relocated from Sacramento to Los Angeles to "either sign with a label or go back to school." However, frustrated by "playing all nasty inappropriate little gigs, suffering all the demeaning little scams", and by a lack of success or respect in the male-dominated rock scene, Wild Honey decided to disband after one final open mic appearance at Doug Weston's Troubadour Club in West Hollywood in 1969. They were spotted at this gig by the secretary of producer Richard Perry, who had been searching for an all-female rock band to mentor. Perry convinced Warner Bros. to sign the band to their Reprise Records subsidiary. After Addie Clement left the band, Millington became the lead guitarist, taking a year to learn to play lead guitar. While searching for a fourth member for the band, Wild Honey recorded in various studios with an assortment of women, including former Svelts drummer Brie Berry Brandt.

=== 1970–1973: Fanny ===
Later in 1969, the band was renamed Fanny to denote a female spirit, although it was a deliberate double entendre. Before recording their first album, In January 1970 keyboardist Nicole "Nickey" Barclay, was added to the Fanny lineup. Millington was the lead guitarist in Fanny with her sister Jean on bass, de Buhr on drums, and Barclay on keyboards. The band lived in a Spanish style house they christened "Fanny Hill" on Marmont Lane overlooking the Sunset Strip in West Hollywood. However, in March 1970, Barclay left Fanny to be a member of Joe Cocker's hastily organized Mad Dogs & Englishmen seven-week tour of the U.S., but rejoined Fanny reluctantly after that tour concluded in May 1970. Their first big gig as Fanny was at the Santa Monica Civic Auditorium with the Kinks and Procol Harum.

Fanny was the first all-female rock band to release an album on a major label. They eventually released five albums and achieved two top-40 singles on the Billboard Hot 100. In 1999 Fanny fan David Bowie said that Fanny was "extraordinary... they're as important as anybody else who's ever been, ever; it just wasn't their time."

Millington and the other members of Fanny also worked as session musicians, most notably in June 1971 on Barbra Streisand's album Barbra Joan Streisand that was produced by Perry. They appeared on national TV programs, including The Tonight Show with Johnny Carson, The Midnight Special, Don Kirshner Presents, and the Sonny & Cher Comedy Hour. Additionally, they appeared on The Kenny Rogers Show in Canada, the BBC's Old Grey Whistle Test, and Germany's Beat-Club.

Because of tensions within the band, including frequent disagreements with Barclay over their conflicting musical preferences, and soon after having a nervous breakdown "because of the pressures of touring, recording, coping with success, maintaining success, and maintaining a certain image in the boy-defined rock world", Millington left Fanny after their fourth album Mothers Pride was released in February 1973. Millington was replaced as lead guitarist in March 1974 by Patti Quatro, sister of Suzi Quatro, and former member of all-female bands the Pleasure Seekers and Cradle. Thirty years after her breakdown, Millington summarized: "Instead of carrying it all, I just fell apart." In 2008, Millington revealed in an interview:

I was just so intent on my mission to do music come hell or high water that I was missing a lot of the subtleties of life—which is why I'd left Hollywood. I had intuited that I was in trouble and I had to leave—which was very difficult. It was hard to leave that whole scene, it was hard to leave rock 'n' roll in that way, it was hard to leave the band that we had worked so hard to establish, it was hard to leave my sister. But I was falling apart.

=== 1973–1975: Smiles and women's music ===
After she left Fanny in 1973, Millington moved to Peconic, New York, on Long Island, and soon after to her recently purchased farm on Mead Mountain, Woodstock, New York, to focus on her songwriting and spiritual development. Soon after, Millington started a solo career in New York, where she eventually became the lover of musician Jacqueline "Jackie" Robbins, who played bass guitar, cello, and bass. Millington and Robbins played together, but she also regularly played with other bands such as Randall's Island and Sha-Na-Na. Millington recalled in November 2012:

I jammed with whomever whenever I could, as that was part of what I'd felt was missing from my life. Most people don't realize how many women players there were in New York at that time. There were a lot, funky too, and serious about playing; they'd be practicing all the time.

About 1973, Millington formed a band called Smiles in New York, which also included percussionist Padi Macheta. In 1975, Millington worked in New Orleans as a guest musician on the Allen Toussaint-produced album Ain't No Stopping Us Now by the all-female jazz fusion band Isis that had been founded by Ginger Bianco and Carol MacDonald, who had both been in pioneer all-female band Goldie & the Gingerbreads.

After a period of rest and renewal, in 1975, Millington began a musical association with Cris Williamson through her friendship with Robbins. Through Williamson's influence, Millington became involved in the burgeoning women's music movement (often code for lesbian music). In the winter of 1975, both Millington and Robbins traveled to Los Angeles to play on Williamson's The Changer and the Changed: A Record of the Times, which would become the definitive work of the genre. Millington headlined major women's music festivals for decades.

=== 1975–1976: Fanny/ L.A. All-Stars ===
Due to the chart success of Fanny's song "Butter Boy", which became their biggest single, reaching number 29 on the Billboard Hot 100 on April 5, 1975, the Millington sisters put together a new line-up of Fanny for a short tour, which also included former Svelts drummer Brie Howard, keyboardist Wendy Haas (formerly of pioneer all-female band the Freudian Slips of Atherton, California), and percussionist Padi Macheta. This incarnation of Fanny played none of the older Fanny songs. This group ultimately morphed into a new all-women band called the L.A. All-Stars, which, by 1976, had generated some interest from record labels (including Arista), but with the stipulation that the band tour as Fanny and play only old Fanny songs, which Millington opposed. In 1976, Millington and the members of the L.A. All-Stars provided backing vocals on Lee Garrett's song "You're My Everything" that reached number 15 in the UK.

In 1976, Millington was part of Cris Williamson's national tour, and toured with Williamson over the next three years, and helped produce seven albums for Williamson. Since then, Millington also produced records for Tret Fure, Meg Christian, Holly Near, Mary Watkins, Bitch and Animal, John Simon, Diane Lincoln, Melanie DeMore, Jamie Anderson, Dorothy Dittrich, Ferron, Ruth Huber, Linq, and Joel Zoss. Additionally, Millington was the audio engineer on records by DeMore, Williamson, Anderson, Dittrich, Sharon Knight, Alice Di Micele, Ferron, Fure, Near, Bitch & Animal, Linq, and Zoss.

=== 1977–1978: Millington ===
In 1977, June and Jean Millington reunited as a duo called Millington, and recorded Ladies on the Stage (1978) for United Artists. June Millington was also featured on the 1977 compilation album Lesbian Concentrate: A Lesbianthology of Songs and Poems (Olivia Records LF 915) that was a response to the antigay Save Our Children campaign of Anita Bryant. In 1978, Millington and Robbins collaborated with Williamson on the album Live Dreams, which was a live album of recorded performances, featuring Millington on drums and guitars and Robbins on bass and cello.

=== 1980–1993: Solo albums, Fabulous Records, and personal life ===
In early 1980, Millington started working on her debut solo album, Heartsong, a soft-rock folk album, and toured to support the album.

By August 1981, Millington had moved to the Bay Area, and had separated from Robbins, with Robbins briefly becoming the partner of Cris Williamson. In 1981 Millington started her own record label, Fabulous Records, a subsidiary of Olivia Records. Through most of the 1980s, Millington toured as a solo artist, promoting her albums released on Fabulous Records: Heartsong (1981), Running (1983), and One World, One Heart (1988).

In 1981 Millington produced activist Holly Near's "Fire in the Rain" album for Redwood Records.

After the collapse of a relationship, in 1982, Millington moved to Milwaukee, Wisconsin, where she wrote the songs for her Running album. At that time, Millington was studying Tibetan Buddhism. Millington recorded Running in San Francisco at the Wally Heider Studios on Hyde Street, with her sister Jean playing on it. Earl Slick, Jean's then husband played on the title cut.

In 1984, Millington moved briefly to Kurtistown, Hawaii, where her youngest brother David lived, and wrote songs for her album One World, One Heart. In an effort to deepen her understanding of Tibetan Buddhism, in the autumn of 1984 Millington started following the Dalai Lama around and received his teachings.

In 1984, Millington began her domestic partnership with education activist Ann F. Hackler. Millington moved to the Amherst, Massachusetts area, where Hackler was director of the Women's Center at Hampshire College. Millington recalled in November 2012:

I lived with her at the college for two years and learned a lot about institutional thinking.

Ticket to Wonderful was released by the Millington sisters in 1993.

=== Since 1999 ===
As of 1999, the Millingtons had formed a six-person band, the Slammin' Babes, that released an album Melting Pot in August 2001. The Slammin' Babes continued to perform until mid-2006.

In 2002, Millington was featured in and was also the associate director of Radical Harmonies, a documentary about the history of women's music directed by Dee Mosbacher. Millington was co-composer (with Lee Madeloni) for the 2009 documentary The Heretics, the inside story of a pivotal force in the "second wave" of the Women's Movement written and directed by Joan Braderman.

Play Like a Girl, Millington and her sister Jean's most recent album, was released in August 2011 on Fabulous Records. Millington explained its purpose:

When we started out in 1965, we 'played like a girl'. With this album, we're reclaiming that phrase and making it a statement of power and vision. It's a gift to still be rockin' out, while teaching the next generation how to find their own voices through music.

Beginning in 2011, Millington was artist-in-residence at the University of Western Ontario in London, Ontario. Since 2011, Millington has been completing her autobiography, Land of a Thousand Bridges, that is funded through Kickstarter, with all proceeds to support the work of the IMA .

In February 2013, Millington and fellow Fanny alumni Alice de Buhr and Jean Millington re-recorded two Fanny classic songs for a documentary entitled Feminist: Stories from the Women's Liberation 1963–1970.

Millington plays Jane Wong, bassist and singer in an all-female band in the 2015 independent feature film SUGAR!, which was written by Leora Kalish and directed by Shari Berman. Starring Alice Ripley and Robert Clohessy, the film tells the story of the housewife of a Republican candidate for U.S. Senate, who secretly forms an all-women rock band.

The 2021 documentary Fanny: The Right to Rock presents a history of Fanny from their origins through Fanny Walked the Earth.

Millington toured with Tiny Desk Contest Winner Ruby Ibarra in 2025.

== Institute for the Musical Arts ==
In 1986, Millington and Hackler founded the Institute for the Musical Arts (IMA) in Bodega, California. The IMA received its nonprofit status in 1987, and operated its studio and programs from the historic Old Creamery in Bodega until 2001, when a 25-acre permanent property was purchased in Goshen, Massachusetts. The IMA's nonprofit mission is to support women and girls in music and music-related businesses. Rooted in the legacy of progressive equal rights movements, IMA's development is guided by the visions, needs, and concerns of women from a diversity of backgrounds. Its programs including a Rock 'n Roll Camp for Girls, and workshops on vocal and instrumental instruction, album production and recording techniques, lyric and music composition, and booking, promotion, and entertainment law.

== Awards and recognition ==
Millington has been highly regarded for her work on behalf of women musicians and the LGBT community. Millington indicates that when she was 20 years old she knew she was a lesbian, and that while "everybody" associated with the band Fanny knew, at that time "you didn't talk about it", and it was not featured in the promotion of Fanny.

In 1996 the Audio Engineering Society honored Millington with its Lifetime Achievement award, and also presented Millington the first AES Women in Audio 'Granny' award along with Suzanne Ciani. In 2000, the Bay Area Career Women gave her their LAVA award for being a "legend of women's music". In 2005, Millington received the Outmusic Heritage Award and in 2007 she, along with the other members of Fanny, received the ROCKRGRL Women of Valor Award from magazine founder Carla DeSantis Black, Berklee College of Music and ROCKRGRL magazine.

In February 2016, there was a pop-up gallery multimedia retrospective of Millington's life and career called "Play Like a Girl". Hosted in an empty storefront in downtown Northampton, Massachusetts, this gallery featured photographs, instruments, records, and other rock n' roll memorabilia from throughout Millington's life. This retrospective was inspired, in part, by the May 2015 publication of Millington's autobiography, Land of a Thousand Bridges: Island Girl in a Rock and Roll World.

In 2025, Millington played alongside Ruby Ibarra in NPR Music’s Tiny Desk Contest. After winning the 2025 contest, Ibarra and Millington toured the United States for the Tiny Desk Contest On The Road Tour.

== Discography ==
=== Albums ===
Albums associated with June Millington
Year	Title	Artist	Record label	Notes
1970	Fanny	Fanny	Reprise Records	Germany: 1971; Reissue: 2013; Real Gone Music
1971	Charity Ball	Fanny	Reprise Records	US Charts #150 7 weeks
1972	Fanny Hill	Fanny	Reprise Records	
1973	Mothers Pride	Fanny	Reprise Records	
1977	Ladies on the Stage	Millington (June and Jean)	United Artists	
1978	Live Dream	Cris Williamson with Jackie Robbins and June Millington	Olivia Records	
1981	Heartsong	June Millington	Fabulous Records	
1983	Running	June Millington	Fabulous Records	
1988	One World, One Heart	June Millington	Fabulous Records	
1993	Ticket to Wonderful	June & Jean Millington	Fabulous Records	
1998	Fanny Live	Fanny	Slick Music	Recorded 1972
2001	Melting Pot	Slammin' Babes (June and Jean Millington)	Fabulous Records	
2002	First Time in a Long Time: The Reprise Recordings	Fanny	Rhino Records	Compilation box set
2011	Play Like a Girl	June & Jean Millington	Fabulous Records	
2018	Fanny Walked the Earth	Fanny Walked the Earth	Blue Elan Records	
2022	Snapshots	June Millington	Fabulous Records	
2024	Live on Beat Club '71-'72	Fanny	Real Gone Music	
2024	The Reprise Years 1970-1973	Fanny	Cherry Red	Compilation Box Set (Substantially similar to the 2002 compilation with notable exceptions)
2026	Home To My Soul	June Millington	Fabulous Records	

=== Singles ===
==== Fanny ====
- "Ladies' Choice" (June & Jean Millington)/ "New Day" (June & Jean Millington) (1970; Reprise Records 0901)
- "Nowhere To Run" (Holland-Dozier-Holland) / "One Step At a Time" (Armstead, Ashford & Simpson) (1970; Reprise Records 0938)
- "Changing Horses" (Barclay) / "Conversation With a Cop" (Barclay) (1971; Reprise Records 0963)
- "Conversations With a Cop" (Barclay) / "Come and Hold Me" (June & Jean Millington) (1971; Reprise Records 963)
- "Charity Ball" (De Buhr, June & Jean Millington) / "Place in the Country" (Barclay) (US: 1971; Reprise Records 1033) (UK: 1971; Reprise Records K 14109) US Charts #40
- "Ain't That Peculiar" (Moore, Robinson, Tarplin, White) / "Think About the Children" (Millington) (US: 1972; Reprise Records REP 1080) (UK: 1972; Reprise Records K 14165) (Germany: 1972: Reprise Records REP 14165)
- "Young & Dumb" (Ike Turner) / "Knock On My Door" (Barclay) (US: 1973; Reprise Records REP 1119) (UK: 1973 Reprise Records K14217) (Germany: 1972 Reprise Records REP 14 207)
- "I Sold My Heart to the Junkman" (Jimmie Thomas) (UK: 1973; Reprise Records)
- "All Mine" (Jean & June Millington) / "I Need You Need Me" (Barclay) (1973 Reprise Records REP 1148)
- "Last Night I Had a Dream" (Randy Newman) / "Beside Myself" (Barclay & Millington) (1973 Reprise Records REP 1162)
- "Summer Song" (Millington) / "Borrowed Time" (Barclay) (UK: January 1973; Reprise Records K 14220)

==== Millington ====
- "Young and in Love" (Millington) (US: 1977; United Artists Records UAXW 1045)
- "Ladies on the Stage" (Millington) / "Fantasy" (Millington) (US: 1978; United Artists Records) (UK; 1979; United Artists Records UP 36367)

== Videography ==
- Associate director and interviewee, Radical Harmonies (Woman Vision, 2002; Wolfe Video, 2004; directed by Dee Mosbacher).
- SUGAR! (independent feature film, 2015)
- Fanny: The Right to Rock (2021; directed by Bobbi Jo Hart).
