= The Pleasure Seekers (band) =

American all-female rock band

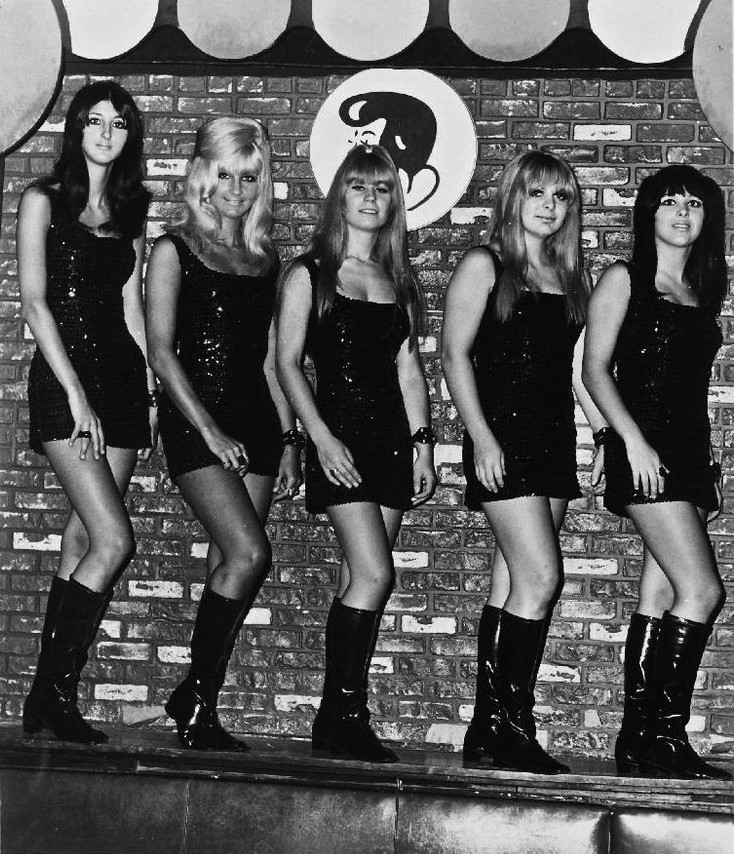
- Patti Quatro, Arlene Quatro, Eileen Biddlingmeier, Diane Baker, Suzi Quatro

Background information
- Also known as: Cradle
- Origin: Detroit, Michigan, U.S.
- Genres: Garage rock
- Years active: 1964–1973
- Labels: Hideout; Mercury; Cradle Rocks
- Past members: Suzi Quatro; Patti Quatro; Nancy Ball; Mary Lou Ball; Diane Baker; Arlene Quatro; Darline Arnone; Nancy Quatro; Pris Wenzell; Sherry Hammerlee; Eileen Biddlingmeier; Pami Benford; Nancy Rogers; Jerry Nolan; Lynne Serridge; Leigh Serridge
- Website: quatrorock.com

The Pleasure Seekers was a 1964-founded, all-female rock band from Detroit, Michigan. The band morphed into Cradle, changing direction musically. They are known in large part due to the later prominence of band member Suzi Quatro.

== Name ==
According to Suzi Quatro in her memoir Unzipped, the Quatro sisters searched a dictionary for a name for their band. Upon encountering "hedonist", they used the definition "pleasure seeker" to create the band's name.

== History ==
=== Biography ===
During May 1964, the Pleasure Seekers were formed by Patti Quatro in Detroit, Michigan. The original lineup included lead singers Suzi Quatro and Patti Quatro, with Nancy Ball on drums, Mary Lou Ball on guitar, and Diane Baker on piano. Leo Fenn, the husband of sister Arlene Quatro, was the band's manager. Patti asked Dave Leone to give them a spot at his teen night club, The Hideout. He put them on stage two weeks later, and they soon became well known at the venue. They gained momentum in the burgeoning Detroit rock community, playing concerts and teen clubs with Ted Nugent, Bob Seger and others.

The band's first record was released on the Hideout Records label in 1965, when Suzi and Patti Quatro were 15 and 17 years old, respectively. Both sides of their first single, "Never Thought You'd Leave Me" b/w "What a Way to Die", have some prominence. The former is included on Highs in the Mid-Sixties, Volume 6, while the latter was covered by the Mummies in the B movie Blood Orgy of the Leather Girls (1988). Both songs, with lyrics by Dave Leone, are included on the compilation album Friday at the Hideout, a Hideout Records retrospective that charted regionally.

During early 1966, Sheryl "Sherry" Hammerlee joined the band on rhythm guitar and Arlene Quatro replaced Diane Baker on piano. In October that year Darline Arnone joined the band. Pami Benford also joined in August 1967, replacing Hammerlee.

In 1968, they became one of the earliest all-female rock bands to sign with a major label, Mercury Records. They released a second single, "Light of Love" b/w "Good Kind of Hurt", with both songs charting. The group matured into a dynamic show band and toured the US. Their show featured a Sgt. Pepper/Magical Mystery Tour revue, as well as a Motown sound revue. The show incorporated one of the earliest light shows.

=== Cradle ===
In 1969, the Pleasure Seekers morphed into Cradle, changing direction musically in writing heavier original material and touring the US. Arlene was now manager and sister Nancy Quatro (born 1953) had joined as vocalist and percussionist. The group toured vigorously, playing concerts and pop festivals throughout the US with popular bands of the day, ending with a tour of Vietnam. In 1971, Suzi was signed by producer Mickie Most to his RAK Records label, leaving for the UK and solo fame as Suzi Quatro. Jerry Nolan later of the New York Dolls drummed with the band in the months leading up to Suzi's departure. Patti continued with sister Nancy in Cradle, then joined brother Mike's MQ Jam Band, co-producing and recording an album, Look Deeply into the Mirror.

=== Current ===
The Quatro sisters have reunited for special TV and concert projects through the years, reminiscent of the early Pleasure Seekers days.

Patti currently runs Cradle Rocks Publishing with sister Nancy, and is involved in restoring the original, never released catalogue of Pleasure Seekers and Cradle music.

The History, a newly remastered album of music from Cradle was released in 2010.

What a Way to Die, a newly remastered album of music from the Pleasure Seekers was released in 2011.

== Personal life ==
Arlene Quatro and Leo Fenn married and have a daughter, actress Sherilyn Fenn. Arlene left the music business, authoring a book on health and becoming involved in environmental issues.

Nancy Quatro turned to music management, forming N. Glass Management and managing the band Overscene.

In 1974, Patti (now Patti Ericson) joined Fanny, appearing on their Rock and Roll Survivors album and two singles, "I've Had It" and "Butter Boy", which reached No. 29 nationally. Patti left Fanny in 1975. She continued to pursue studio work on several albums, musical side projects and modeling.

Suzi Quatro became popular in Europe, enjoying a successful long-lasting music career. She sold over 55 million records and remains active as a touring and recording artist. She also branched out as a TV actress, stage actress, radio DJ and author. She appeared as Leather Tuscadero in the TV show Happy Days.

== Personnel ==
- Suzi Quatro – lead vocals, bass (1964–1969)
- Patti Quatro – lead guitar, backing vocals (1964–1969)
- Mary Lou Ball – rhythm guitar (1964–1966)
- Diane Baker – keyboards (1964–1965)
- Nancy Ball – drums (1964–1966)
- Pris Wensell – keyboards (1965)
- Arlene Quatro – keyboards (1966–1969)
- Eileen Biddlingmeier – rhythm guitar (1966–1967)
- Sheryl "Sherry" Hammerlee – rhythm guitar (1966)
- Pami Benford – rhythm guitar, bass (1967–1969)
- Darline Arnone – drums (1966–1968), also nicknamed "Thumper", the first female drummer sponsored by Slingerland
- Nancy Rogers – drums (1968–1969)

== Discography ==
=== Singles ===
- "Never Thought You'd Leave Me" (1965), Hideout Records
- "Light of Love" (1968), Mercury Records

=== Compilation albums ===
- Highs in the Mid-Sixties, Volume 6 (1984), AIP Records – a picture of the Pleasure Seekers appears on the cover of the album.
- Friday At the Hideout (Boss Detroit Garage 1964–67) (2001), Norton Records
- The History (2010), Cradle – distributed by CD Baby
- What a Way to Die (2011), The Pleasure Seekers – distributed by CD Baby
