= Richard Perry =

American record producer (1942–2024)

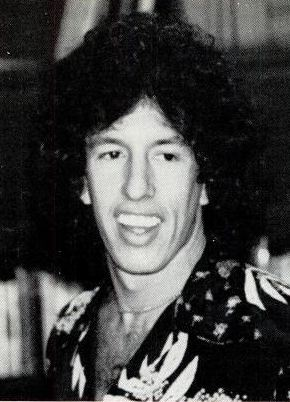
- Perry c. 1975

Background information
- Born: Richard Van Perry; June 18, 1942; New York City, U.S.
- Died: December 24, 2024 (aged 82) Los Angeles, California, U.S.
- Occupation: Record producer
- Years active: 1963–2011
- Labels: Planet; RCA Records
- Spouse: Linda Goldner (1970s) Rebecca Broussard (m. 1987; div. 1988)
- Partner: Jane Fonda (2009–2017)
- Website: richardperrymusic.com

Richard Van Perry (June 18, 1942 – December 24, 2024) was an American record producer. He began his musical career as a performer while attending Poly Prep, his high school in Brooklyn. After graduating from college he rose through the late 1960s and early 1970s to become a successful and popular record producer. He had more than twelve Gold records to his credit by 1982, four of which went Platinum.

From 1978 to 1983 he ran his own record label, Planet Records, which scored a string of hits with the main act on its roster, pop and R&B group the Pointer Sisters. After Planet's sale to RCA Records, Perry continued his work in the music industry as an independent producer. With hit records stretching from the 1960s through the 2000s, his successful modern releases included albums by Rod Stewart and Carly Simon. In 1972 he produced Simon's hit single "You're So Vain".

== Early life ==
Perry was born in Brooklyn, New York City, on June 18, 1942, the eldest of four sons of Mack Perry and Sylvia (nee Haykin). He had Jewish ancestry and his parents were music teachers who ran a business selling musical instruments to schools. Perry was classically trained on piano and oboe from a young age, and added guitar, bass and drums to his repertoire with the arrival of rock 'n' roll. He began his career in rock music as a local performer during his adolescence. In 1955, at the age of 12, he attended the first of Alan Freed's live rock shows at the Paramount Theatre in Brooklyn. He was inspired by seeing Chuck Berry, Little Richard, Jerry Lee Lewis and Buddy Holly perform and met them backstage.

Perry attended Brooklyn's Poly Prep Country Day School, where he sang bass in a doo-wop group called the Legends with three other students. In the early 1960s the group signed to Coral Records and was renamed the Escorts, recording seven singles 1962–63. He took a degree course in music at the University of Michigan (BMus '64), then shifted briefly into songwriting and acting while working at Kama Sutra Records in its marketing division, collaborating with Kenny Vance. He began his career as a producer with early projects including Captain Beefheart's debut Safe as Milk and Fats Domino's Fats Is Back. He formed a production company in New York called Cloud Nine before moving to Los Angeles in 1967. In 1968 he landed a job as a staff producer at Warner Bros and produced God Bless Tiny Tim, the debut album of Reprise Records artist Tiny Tim. The album was Perry's first charting hit, reaching No. 7 on Billboard magazine's Pop Albums chart.

== Career ==
=== 1970s and 1980s ===
Perry went freelance and was established as a producer by 1970. His first independent production was Barbra Streisand's million-selling album Stoney End. His credits during the subsequent decade included albums by Harry Nilsson (Nilsson Schmilsson, Son of Schmilsson), Carly Simon (No Secrets, Hotcakes, Playing Possum), Art Garfunkel (Breakaway), Diana Ross (Baby It's Me), Martha Reeves (Martha Reeves), the Manhattan Transfer (Coming Out), Leo Sayer (Leo Sayer), and Andy Williams (Solitaire).

He was a perfectionist in the studio and "worked his artists hard". He had one of his biggest hits with his production on Carly Simon's song "You're So Vain". Among his other projects was the 1973 album Ringo by former Beatles drummer Ringo Starr. The album featured contributions from the other three ex-Beatles and reached No. 2 on the Pop Albums chart. Another high point was his work with Fanny. Perry produced the group's first three albums, Fanny (1970), Charity Ball, which featured the top 40 title track (1971), and Fanny Hill (1972).

AllMusic's Bruce Eder stated that in the 1970s Perry was "the most renowned producer in the field of popular music", and said that "his mere involvement with a recording project was enough to engender a mention in the music trade papers and even the popular music press, and the array of Gold- and Platinum-selling albums with which he was associated made his name synonymous with success." As early as 1973, Village Voice said of Perry that "the rungs on the ladder of success seem so much closer together when Perry is your guide."

In 1978, Perry played the part of a record producer in the film American Hot Wax, which was based on the life of disc jockey Alan Freed, and launched his own label, Planet Records, which he ran for six years until it was purchased by RCA Records in 1983. He had "huge success" with the Pointer Sisters and produced a string of dance hits for them including "Fire", "I'm So Excited" and "Neutron Dance".

By then Perry had produced throughout his career at least fifteen Gold records, four of which had gone Platinum, and a dozen Gold singles. Among the label's roster during his tenure were acts such as Billy Thermal, Bates Motel, the Plimsouls, the Cretones, Bill Medley, Sue Saad and the Next, and the Pointer Sisters, whose charting album Energy was the label's debut.

After leaving Planet Records Perry continued to produce some of its acts, including the Pointer Sisters, and worked with artists such as Streisand, Donna Summer, Julio Iglesias, Neil Diamond, and Randy Travis. Streisand found working with Perry "fun and musically liberating" and said he "had a knack for matching the right song to the right artist". After his success in reviving Streisand's singing career, he was in demand. His next major success was Nilsson's 1971 album Nilsson Schmilsson, recorded in London, which included the no.1 single "Without You". Nilsson had wanted a simple piano backing for the song, but Perry convinced him that a "theatrical monster ballad, complete with orchestra", would work better.

While pursuing these projects, Perry also spent the later part of the 1980s working on a passion project, 1989's Rock, Rhythm & Blues, which featured contemporary artists such as Elton John, Rick James and Chaka Khan performing classic rock songs by musicians of the 1950s and early 1960s.

=== 1990s and 2000s ===
In the 1990s and the 2000s Perry worked with Ray Charles on 1993's My World which was a minor chart success, reaching No. 145 on Billboard 200. He is credited with helping to craft Rod Stewart's charting pop standards albums in the Great American Songbook series, including It Had to Be You: The Great American Songbook. Perry co-produced the first three records in the series.

In 2004 he was reunited with Carly Simon. The resultant collaboration was 2005's Moonlight Serenade, which reached No. 7 on the Billboard 200 and was also a top Internet download. In 2006 he worked with another previous collaborator, Art Garfunkel, receiving both producer and singing credits on 2007's Some Enchanted Evening. The last credit on the discography page on his website is from 2011 for producing the cast recording of the Broadway production of Baby It's You!.

== Personal life and death ==
Perry was married twice; both marriages ended in divorce. He married Linda Goldner in the 1970s and was married to actress Rebecca Broussard from 1987 to 1988. They had no children together. He was in a relationship with Jane Fonda from 2009 to 2017, and they shared a home in Beverly Hills for eight years.

Perry died from cardiac arrest at a hospital in Los Angeles, on December 24, 2024, at the age of 82. At the time of his death, he also had Parkinson's disease, and had lost his ability to speak due to the disease.
