= Coke Escovedo =

American percussionist (1941–1986)

- Born: Joseph Thomas Escovedo; April 30, 1941; Los Angeles, California, U.S.
- Origin: Oakland, California, U.S.
- Died: July 13, 1986 (aged 45) Montebello, California, U.S.
- Genres: R&B, jazz fusion, soul, disco, funk
- Occupation: Percussionist
- Instruments: Percussions, timbales, congas, bongos, tambourine, vocals
- Years active: 1958–1986
- Label: Mercury
- Formerly of: Santana, Azteca, Pete Escovedo

Joseph Thomas "Coke" Escovedo (April 30, 1941 – July 13, 1986) was an American percussionist, who came from a prominent musical family including five musician brothers and his niece, Sheila E. He played in various genres, including R&B, jazz fusion and soul, with bands including Santana, Malo, Cal Tjader, and Azteca.

== Early life ==
Escovedo was born in Los Angeles, California, the son of Pedro Escovedo, a plumber and amateur musician, who had immigrated from Mexico at age 12, and Anita (née Valenzuela). Escovedo grew up in the East Bay region of the San Francisco Bay Area. He developed an early interest in jazz and Latin music through exposure gained from his father Pedro, an aspiring big band singer, and eventually gravitated to drums and Latin percussion. Coke's older brother, fellow percussionist Pete Escovedo, recruited Escovedo for a local Latin jazz combo led by pianist Carlos Federico. The Federico combo evolved into the Escovedo Brothers Band, which also counted Pete, bassist brother Phil Escovedo, saxophonist-flautist Mel Martin and trombonist Al Bent among its regular members.

== Career ==
Escovedo began to gain some notability in the San Francisco Bay Area Latin jazz scene and worked with jazz vibraphonist Cal Tjader (some of his finest work can be found on Tjader's album Agua Dulce). Escovedo rose to even greater prominence in early 1971 when he first became a member of Santana, initially as a replacement for timbale player Jose "Chepito" Areas, who had been sidelined with medical issues. Escovedo was featured on Santana's Santana III (1971) album. Escovedo co-authored a hit song from that album, "No One to Depend On", which peaked at #36 on the Billboard Hot 100 chart. Years later the song would be covered by Vitamin C as part of her 1999 hit "Me, Myself and I" (#36 on Top 40 Mainstream chart).

While in the Santana band, Escovedo performed at many high-profile concerts, including the historic closing of the Fillmore West (appearing on the live recording and documentary film from that event). Santana drummer Michael Shrieve has credited Escovedo for showing him how to incorporate some Latin percussion figures into his drum set playing during their time together.

During Carlos Santana's transition period between the original and "New" Santana bands, Escovedo also performed with the Carlos Santana/Buddy Miles group, appearing on the 1972 release Carlos Santana & Buddy Miles! Live!

Escovedo and Areas had been pioneering a new style on the traditional Cuban timbales. Though drawing on the influence of timbale virtuosos Tito Puente and Willie Bobo, Escovedo took the explosive power of the Cuban drums even farther, adapting them to rock, soul, and funk recordings by artists such as Boz Scaggs, Cold Blood, It's a Beautiful Day, and Malo (with whom he was a featured soloist on their debut LP), as well as to freer Latin jazz experiments with artists such as trumpeter Luis Gasca.

In early 1972, Escovedo, following his vision of putting together "a band that could play anything", formed Azteca along with his brother Pete Escovedo. The band signed to Columbia Records and released its self-titled debut album in December 1972. It reached No. 38 on the R&B chart in 1973. A second album, Pyramid of the Moon, was released in the fall of 1973. Both albums prominently featured Escovedo's timbale playing and some of his compositions, as leader of an all-star cast of musicians, many of whom would become prominent solo artists. Despite garnering critical acclaim and playing high-profile concert tours, the big-band Azteca lineup was difficult to sustain. Their second release, Pyramid of the Moon failed to chart and by 1974, Escovedo left Azteca.

In 1975, he began work on the first of his three solo albums, simply titled Coke. This 1976 solo debut featured a spare, sophisticated soul/funk/jazz/Latin blend highlighting the talents of vocalist Linda Tillery (formerly of The Loading Zone) and keyboardist-composer Herman Eberitzsch. A Top 100 R&B single, "Make It Sweet", resulted, along with a TV appearance on Don Kirshner's Rock Concert. Escovedo recorded two more albums: the pop-oriented Comin' at Ya! (featuring former Azteca vocalist Errol Knowles) in 1976. 1977's Disco Fantasy proved critically and commercially disappointing and became the last album of solo material he released.

Escovedo continued to perform in the San Francisco Bay Area and beyond at the helm of a band that included former Malo guitarist Abel Zarate in pursuit of a new record deal which never materialized. He also continued to do session work and to tour with the likes of Santana, Herbie Hancock and his niece Sheila E, finally relocating to the Los Angeles area in the 1980s.

== Personal life ==
Coke Escovedo has five musician brothers:

- Phil Escovedo played bass alongside Coke and Pete in the Escovedo Brothers Band, and also on sessions with Latin Jazz vibraphonist Cal Tjader.
- Pete Escovedo also was a percussionist with Santana. His daughter Sheila E. is a well known percussionist.
- Alejandro Escovedo is currently a prominent recording artist working in the Americana style of music. He and Jon Dee Graham formerly led the True Believers.
- Javier Escovedo was a member of the pioneering punk rock band The Zeros, as well as of the True Believers.
- Mario Escovedo fronted critically acclaimed San Diego rockers The Dragons.

Coke Escovedo also has a son, Paris A. Escovedo of the Escovedo Project, and 2 daughters, Sabrina L. Escovedo and Antonia Escovedo.

== Death ==
Escovedo died of cirrhosis at the age of 45 on July 13, 1986.

== Discography ==
=== Studio albums ===
Year	Album	Chart positions		Record label
Year	Album	US	US R&B	Record label
1975	Coke	195	44	Mercury Records
1976	Comin' at Ya!	190	37	Mercury Records
1977	Disco Fantasy	195	—	Mercury Records
