= Disco Fantasy =

Studio album by Coke Escovedo
- Released: 1977
- Recorded: 1977
- Studios: Different Fur Studios, San Francisco, California
- Genre: Soul
- Label: Mercury
- Producer: Patrick Gleeson

Coke Escovedo chronology
Comin' at Ya! (1976)	Disco Fantasy (1977)

Professional ratings
Review scores
Source	Rating
Allmusic	4/5 stars

Disco Fantasy is the third and final album by the former Santana and Azteca band member Coke Escovedo. Produced by Patrick Gleeson, it was released in 1977 on Mercury Records.

== Track listing ==
1. "Doesn't Anybody Want to Hear a Love Song" - (Dennis Geyer) 3:27
2. "Disco Fantasy" - (Mark Phillips) 3:24
3. "Hot Soul Single" - (Mark Phillips) 3:35
4. "Who Do You Want to Love" - (Mark Phillips) 4:04
5. "Won't You Gimme The Funk" - (Mark Phillips) 3:33
6. "Trash Man" - (Herman Eberitzsch) 4:46
7. "Something Special" - (Herman Eberitzsch) 4:12
8. "Your Kind of Loving" - (Mark Phillips) 3:05
9. "Soul Support" - (Herman Eberitzsch) 4:17

== Personnel ==
- Coke Escovedo - Timbales, Congas, Percussion, Vocals
- Harvey Mason - Drums
- Paul Jackson - Bass
- Hugh McCracken, Tom Rotella - Guitar
- Patrick Gleeson, Roger Smith - Keyboards
- Emilio Castillo - Tenor Saxophone
- Stephen Kupka - Baritone Saxophone
- Mic Gillette - Trombone Trumpet
- Lenny Pickett - Alto Saxophone, Tenor Saxophone, Lyricon (Eu-lyricon)
- Greg Adams - Trumpet
- Linda Tillery - Lead Vocals
- Gwen Owens, Julia Tillman, Maxine Willard - Backing Vocals

== Charts ==
Chart (1977)	Peak position
Billboard Top LPs	195
