= Linda Tillery =

American singer and percussionist

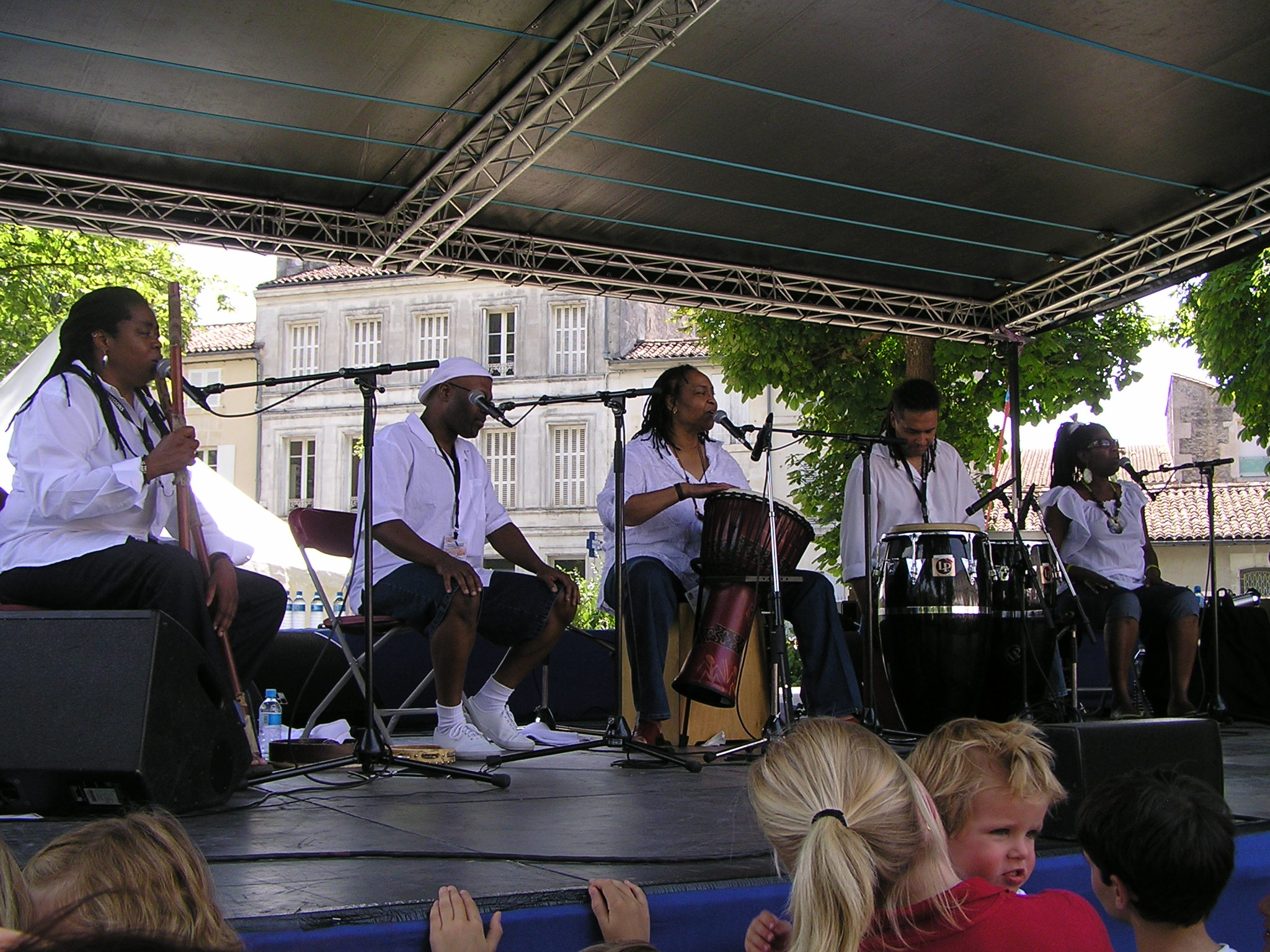
- Tillery (center) performing with The Cultural Heritage Choir in July 2008

Background information
- Born: Linda Joyce Tillery; September 2, 1948 (age 78); San Francisco, California, U.S.
- Genres: R&B; gospel; folk; pop
- Occupations: Singer; musician; producer; songwriter; arranger
- Instruments: Vocals; drums; percussion
- Years active: 1968–present
- Labels: RCA; Umbrella; CBS; Olivia; 411/Redwood; Music for Little People; EarthBeat!; Round Whirled
- Website: Tillery's archived website

Linda "Tui" Tillery (born September 2, 1948) is an American singer, percussionist, producer, songwriter, and music arranger. She began her professional singing career at age 19 with the Bay Area rock band The Loading Zone. She is recognized as a pioneer in women's music, with her second solo album titled Linda Tillery released on Olivia Records in 1977. In addition to performing, she was the producer on three of Olivia's first eight albums. Within the women's music genre, she has collaborated with June Millington, Deidre McCalla, Barbara Higbie, Holly Near, Margie Adam, and others. Tillery was nominated for a Grammy Award in 1997 for Best Musical Album for Children.

Tillery has been a professional musician for her entire adult life and has had a long career as a backing or supporting vocalist for mainstream artists as diverse as Santana, Bobby McFerrin, Huey Lewis and the News and the Turtle Island String Quartet. In the early 1990s, she began exploring the roots music of enslaved Africans and the African diaspora, forming the group The Cultural Heritage Choir.

== Early life ==
Tillery was born in 1948 to parents who migrated from Texas to San Francisco during World War II. She was born on the block of Fell Street where the SFJAZZ Center currently stands. Her father (Horace) was a carpenter whose first job after moving to California was at the Hunters Point Shipyard. Her mother (Eva L.) was a seamstress and later worked at a job pressing garments in a Chinatown sweatshop.

Neither of her parents were musicians, but she had two uncles who played cornet. Tillery says her parents were terrible singers but they loved music and had a large collection of 78 rpm records. The music she heard as a young person in her household ranged from Count Basie and Sarah Vaughan to rural and urban blues. By age 2, her favorite singer was Dinah Washington, whose recording of "That's All I Want From You" was particularly loved by Tillery and was the first song she memorized. Tillery claims that she learned how to read by looking at the labels from her parents' record collection. "Basie was on Verve. Dinah was on Mercury". She had memorized Basie's arrangement of "April in Paris" by age 4. She also admired Ethel Merman's big voice, going into her parents' acoustically-pleasing bathroom and trying to imitate Merman's song "There's No Business Like Show Business".

Tillery is a self-taught singer, but her formal music education began at age 13 when she studied the classical bass at Lowell High School in San Francisco. She was allowed to play the drum kit and other instruments such as the bassoon in school because her teacher recognized her superior musical abilities. Also around age 13, Tillery attended a picnic in Pittsburg, California where she saw Vi Redd playing alto saxophone. Tillery says she was mesmerized by Redd and that experience enlightened her to "be able to play whatever instrument I chose. I wanted to sing, but not just as a centerpiece. I wanted to be a unique voice".

Tillery graduated from high school in 1966 and worked for a year while also attending City College of San Francisco. She says her parents always wanted her to be a business major but she says she "got bored very quickly" with college. She dropped out to begin singing professionally.

== Late 1960s: The Loading Zone ==
Tillery first came to prominence as the lead singer in San Francisco group The Loading Zone starting in 1968. The band had just signed with RCA Records and was looking for a new lead singer, so they placed a classified ad in the San Francisco Chronicle stating "Wanted: One Soul Singer" which was also the title of a Johnnie Taylor album that Tillery enjoyed. At least six singers had auditioned for the job but the 19-year-old Tillery had an edge because she had phoned beforehand to make sure she was what the band was seeking. Years later, Loading Zone founder Paul Fauerso described the hiring of Tillery:

She said, 'I'm kind of big, like Big Mama Thornton, and I play harmonica…. She walked through the door in a post office uniform, with little white cat-eyed glasses, and I said, that's our girl. She just looked right. We evolved as a dance band with a fusion of R&B and rock, and we ended up as a psychedelic soul band once we added Linda. She was singing for us by the time we opened for Cream at Winterland. Her mother made her a floor-length ruffled red leather cape. It was very dramatic.

Tillery recalled her audition day with humor. Loading Zone guitarist Steve Dowler went to Tillery's house to pick her up. "Her mother saw a hippie at the door and refused to let him in".

Linda with the Loading Zone frequently played popular Bay Area Night Clubs like Keystone Berkeley, Frenche's in Hayward and The Odyssey Room in Sunnyvale. While The Loading Zone occasionally performed as headliners in concert venues, they were more well known as a popular opening act for other big-name bands. They toured with Vanilla Fudge and The Jeff Beck Group, and opened Bay Area shows for many other bands and performers including The Who on their first American tour, Jethro Tull, Sam & Dave, Cream at San Francisco's famed Winterland Ballroom and Big Brother and the Holding Company featuring Janis Joplin at Bill Graham's historic venue The Fillmore. Of the gig with Big Brother, Tillery and the Loading Zone won over Joplin's fans so much that Joplin told others after the show that Tillery was never allowed again to be on the same bill with her.

The Loading Zone's style has been described as psychedelic soul, and they have been compared somewhat to Sly and the Family Stone. Another critic called their music "a distinctive blend of garage rock, R&B, and jazz". Their debut album titled The Loading Zone was released on RCA Records in 1968 and sold about 100,000 copies. Critical reception was mixed, with many dismayed that the album "didn't come close to capturing the band's energy in concert".

Tillery's tenure with The Loading Zone marked the beginning of her professional career. "Though it was at the height of the drug-crazed rock era, the members of the band had all turned to Transcendental Meditation, were completely clean and sober, and were dealing with a lot of political issues that other musicians wouldn't tackle, like confronting the American Federation of Musicians which was not doing a very good job at providing benefits and protections for musicians. It was the beginning of a journey through consciousness-raising and political development for me". Tillery stayed with The Loading Zone a few years, but the lifestyle became "too much, too soon …. I kind of crashed after that….The lifestyle can either make or break a human being. There are some people who are destroyed by their early success. At least I can say I'm a survivor". The group broke up and reformed in 1969, and had varying membership for periods of time in the late 1960s and early 1970s. One account shows that Tillery left the group in January 1969, rejoined in March 1970 through 1971, and left The Loading Zone for the final time in 1972.

== 1970-1977: Debut solo album and session work ==
As early as 1968, Tillery was performing as a solo artist around the Bay Area under the name Sweet Linda Divine. She signed with CBS Records and released her debut album titled Sweet Linda Divine in 1970. The album was produced by Al Kooper who also played piano, organ and horns on selected songs. Tillery provided lead vocals and played percussion on the recording, which garnered some enthusiastic reviews but did not sell well. The album earned Tillery two consecutive "Jammies" (Bay Area Jazz Awards) for Outstanding Female Vocalist.

Through much of the 1970s, Tillery worked as a session musician providing backing vocals and occasionally playing drums on albums by Santana, Boz Scaggs, Lenny White, Teresa Trull and others. She sang backing vocals on the Santana III album, including on the hit single "Everybody's Everything" which debuted on the Billboard Hit 100 chart on October 16, 1971, peaked at number 12 and remained on the chart for a total of 10 weeks. She also sang backing vocals on the song "Everything's Coming Our Way" from the same album.

During this time, Tillery was a member of the jazz fusion band Cesar 830, which recorded one album. She was also the lead vocalist for Coke Escovedo's soul/funk/jazz/Latin band, appearing on two albums.

Another group with whom she performed during this period was Jessica Hagedorn's Gangster Choir. The "poet's band" had two distinct incarnations based on Hagedorn's residencies in San Francisco in the 1970s and New York City in the 1980s. Tillery was a member of the West Coast Gangster Choir's vocal trio, the Gangsterettes.

Of this period in her career, Tillery said "Then my education as a hard-working singer began…. I was what I call a '9-to-5 musician' from '70 to '77. Played with a lot of bands, did a lot of club work, only the hours were 9 to 2".

== 1975-1979: Olivia Records and women's music ==
Tillery was introduced to Women's music in 1975 when the Bay Area band BeBe K'Roche submitted her name to Olivia Records to produce their album. Tillery produced, arranged, sang backing vocals and played percussion on the 1976 eponymous LP, which was the fledgling record label's third release. In addition to the LP, two singles were released as well. Like most Olivia recordings, the album contains several songs with overt lesbian and/or feminist lyrics, but unlike other early Olivia projects, the style of the music is R&B/funk/jazz and Latin-influenced rock.

Tillery joined the Olivia collective, which became "the pioneering label run by the lesbian-feminist collective that made a place for female musicians, engineers, and producers". Tillery and Olivia collective member (and later Olivia president) Judy Dlugacz recruited Sandy Stone as recording and mix engineer on the BeBe K'Roche recording. At the time, Stone was in the early stages of transitioning from male to female. Stone's presence as a transsexual in the Olivia collective caused an uproar in the late-1970s within segments of the lesbian-feminist community, and they threatened a boycott of Olivia products as a result. The Olivia collective defended Stone in multiple feminist publications, but after long debate, Stone left the collective in 1979.

Tillery's next job with Olivia Records was producing Teresa Trull's debut album titled The Ways A Woman Can Be. Released in 1977, this album also contained overt lesbian/feminist lyrics. In addition to producing, Tillery played drums and contributed supporting vocals to the recording.

Also in 1977, Olivia released the compilation album Lesbian Concentrate in response to Anita Bryant's anti-gay crusade. Tillery contributed the song "Don't Pray For Me" to the LP, which was composed by Mary Watkins. This song has been recognized by scholars as one of the first songs to directly challenge homophobia.

Later in 1977, Olivia Records released Tillery's second solo album, titled Linda Tillery. Tillery was the lead producer, with co-producer credits to bassist Diane Lindsay and keyboardist/string and horn arranger Mary Watkins. It featured Tillery on lead and supporting vocals, drums and percussion, and marked the first time that Tillery, Watkins, and vocalist/vocal arranger Vicki Randle appeared together on an album. Like all Olivia projects at the time, all of the musicians as well as technical staff were female, including Sandy Stone as recording engineer. The album included a slightly longer version of "Don't Pray For Me", as well as two songs with overt lesbian lyrics: "Womanly Way" and "Wonderful", the latter of which was the first song composed entirely by Tillery. The song "Freedom Time", co-written by Tillery and Watkins, brings attention to the problems of being black and female and gay with the lyrics: "If I could just tell you what it's really like/To live this life of triple jeopardy/I fight the daily battles of all my people/Just to sacrifice my pride and deny my strength". This song has been cited as influential in scholarly studies of black feminism and in feminist journals. In a 1978 review in the radical feminist journal off our backs, the style of the album Linda Tillery is described as "characteristically jazz/rock fusion with her clean, funky drumming and excellent interplay between among bass, drums, and keyboards. Combined with the music is a message of lesbian strength, struggle and pride". The album earned Tillery a Bammie (Bay Area Music Award).

In fall 1978, Olivia Records produced the "Varied Voices of Black Women" national tour in response to an all-white lineup of an earlier "Women on Wheels" tour, as well as to promote Olivia artists. The Varied Voices tour played in eight cities and featured Tillery, Mary Watkins, Gwen Avery, Vicki Randle, and poet Pat Parker and brought poetry as well as jazz and blues to women's music audiences. It also exposed audience members to an empowering lesbian culture that was emerging across the USA and it "demonstrated that white lesbians were not the only ones creating a new women's culture: Though the concert [tour] was first and foremost a celebration of Black lesbian feminist identity and culture, it was also an attempt to broaden the white feminist community's understanding of feminist and lesbian identity…. Varied Voices was a watershed event in the history of black women and women-identified music". The film Radical Harmonies documents the history of women's music, and includes a segment on the Varied Voices tour. In the film, musician June Millington describes seeing the performances at the time: "You've never seen anything like it. They really did present this hot, hot, HOT show. And either you really fell into … the well or some people were repelled … because it was almost too much. But that's the good news, because they were groundbreaking".

Linda Tillery was the only album she released on Olivia Records, and Tillery left the collective in 1979. In an interview years later, Tillery described her Olivia experience: "I was quite happy to be in an environment where I could observe other women in the creative process and also in the administrative process because all of my experience up to that point had been working with men. The Loading Zone was nine: me and eight white men; every other band I was in was me and six men, me and five men, me and four men. I had never worked with any women musicians". In a 2020 interview in The Guardian, Tillery said "I'm so thankful for what Olivia did for me and for other women. Suddenly there was this feeling of hope that our lives could be lived safely in a relationship of our choosing."

Tillery has referred to herself as the "queen mother" to women's music, to both deflect the tendency of some to look upon her as a sex object, as well as to recall the term's honorific association in some African cultures.

== 1980-early 1990s: More women's music, more session work, and club bands ==
Although she ended her formal relationship with Olivia in 1979, Tillery remained an important figure in the women's music scene throughout the 1980s and into the 1990s. She has performed at many women's music festivals including the first Michigan Womyn's Music Festival ("MichFest") in 1976 and several subsequent years, bringing her authentic expression of African American blues and R&B to women's music festival audiences. A favorite project that she initiated at MichFest was called "A Tribute to Black Women in the Blues" which presented Tillery's "respect and gratitude paid to some women who might have been otherwise ignored. Who were otherwise ignored! And it was one of the most satisfying moments in my life". A recording was made of the tenth anniversary of MichFest in 1985 with Tillery contributing her rendition of the Al Green hit song "Love and Happiness" to the LP.

For several years at MichFest, Tillery also lead the festival gospel choir that included both professional musicians and festival attendees, which traditionally performed on Sunday mornings. After a controversy whereby some white choir members changed the gender pronouns from male to female in song selections, the 1992 MichFest program booklet description of the choir, led by Tillery, stated: "The repertoire will draw from spirituals and gospel standards and the workshop will include a discussion of the cultural roots of gospel music. The music will be sung exactly as it is written (no gender substitutions of pronouns or names)".

During the 1980s, Tillery performed annually at NEWMR, the Northeast Women's Music Retreat, of which she said "that was the festival where I felt most at home". She has also performed several times at the National Women's Music Festival, as well as Wiminfest in Albuquerque, New Mexico, Roadwork's Sisterfire festival in 1983, and at the first Southern Women's Music Festival in 1984.

On November 26, 1982 Tillery was a member of the all-female band that performed with Meg Christian and Cris Williamson at Carnegie Hall in New York City, to celebrate the tenth anniversary of Olivia Records. Tickets to the two-show performance were sold-out two months prior to the evening to 5,400 women and 200 men, and Olivia released the concert as an LP in 1983, on their Second Wave subsidiary label.

In 1985, Tillery released her third solo album titled Secrets on her own independent 411 Records label and distributed by Redwood Records. Tillery was the LP's co-Executive producer with Ray Obiedo, but acted as primary producer on only two songs ("I'm So Thankful" and "Fever"), with Obiedo producing all other songs except one. The style of the recording is a blend of R&B, gospel, pop, jazz and soul, and garnered some critical success but failed to gain national recognition. The LP's "Motown-y" style made it hard for the women's music distribution network to categorize and therefore market to the majority white women's music audience, despite some positive reviews in the gay press such as "Linda Tillery's latest album … is one of the best records ever to find its way into the Women's Music section of a record store". Secrets garnered some radio airplay in major metropolitan areas such as San Francisco.

Tillery and band toured during 1985 to support the release of Secrets. The touring band included pianist Julie Homi, who performed in both the mainstream New York jazz scene as well as the women's music circuit. Tillery's May 3, 1985 performance at Boston's Strand Theater was especially significant because the show was opened by a then-little known Tufts University undergraduate singer named Tracy Chapman, who made her major-stage debut that evening.

Throughout the 1980s and early 1990s, in addition to performing, recording, and producing albums within the women's music network, Tillery continued to record with mainstream performers. During this time frame, she provided backing vocals on recordings by artists Pete Escovedo, Tiggi Clay, Bobby McFerrin, and Santana. She was a mainstay in the Bay Area music scene, considered by many to be one of the area's "most revered vocalists since the 1960s". In an interview, musician Country Joe McDonald was asked about his favorite Bay Area musicians and he "instantly replied that Tillery was one of the best in the business".

Also in the 1980s, Tillery began a twelve-year musical partnership with Ray Obiedo, an Oakland-based guitarist. Obiedo was the leader of two soul/jazz ensembles "Kick" (featuring a young Sheila E.) and "Rhythmus 21" that both featured Tillery as a vocalist. During this time period, Linda also shared lead vocals with her younger brother Calvin Tillery in the house band at Slim's nightclub in San Francisco which was co-owned by rock/blues musician Boz Scaggs, who often sat in with the band. She was briefly a member of the ZaSu Pitts Memorial Orchestra and also performed with the Solid Senders.

In the early 1990s, Tillery formed and played with the popular Bay Area all-woman Skin Tight Motown Revue band, an R&B/blues/pop outfit that featured Tillery, Vicki Randle and Teresa Trull as vocalists, along with other instrumentalists recognizable to women's music audiences. Skin Tight's first performance was at the 1990 Association of Women's Music and Culture (AWMAC) conference in San Francisco, and they "brought the house down".

In 1993, Tillery was among the performers who celebrated Olivia's 20th anniversary weekend in San Francisco, which coincided with the city's annual Gay pride festivities. On Friday June 25, Tillery performed for the first time in ten years with Mary Watkins at Zellerbach Hall. The duo performed Tillery's song "Womanly Way", and later in the set Tillery was joined by other Olivia artists Dianne Davidson, Deidre McCalla, Nancy Vogl, Teresa Trull, Cris Williamson, Tret Fure, and Lucie Blue Tremblay. On Saturday, Tillery and Skin Tight performed at a dance called "Puttin' On The Ritz" that was jointly sponsored by Olivia and the Bay Area Career Women organization, to celebrate BACW's tenth anniversary and Olivia's twentieth anniversary. That evening, Skin Tight's membership consisted of Ellen Seeling and Jean Fineberg on horns, Joy Julks on bass, Nancy Wenstrom on electric guitar, Maria Martinez on drums, Bonnie Hayes on keyboards (subbing for regular pianist Julie Homi), with Tillery, Vicki Randle, and Teresa Trull providing the vocals.

== 1992-present: Cultural Heritage Choir ==
In 1991 while Tillery was channel surfing on her television, she came across a PBS special featuring opera singers Jessye Norman and Kathleen Battle singing spirituals. Tillery said of that moment: "It practically lifted me out of my seat. I was thinking 'This is the new road. This is the new path. This is the new journey I'm going to take' ". After the music reduced her to tears, she declared to her cat Mimi that "I am going to pursue this music".

Around the same time, Tillery was in rehearsals for the play "Letters From a New England Negro", and the producer sent her a cassette tape containing traditional black folk songs obtained from the Library of Congress and the Smithsonian Institution. Of that recording, Tillery said "Even though I knew some of the songs and the sound of the music was familiar, I didn't realize there was a source for this…. I loved the music. I felt like I had been reborn".

Her next step was to do more extensive research to gather materials to perform. She started by ordering as many recordings from the Library of Congress and the Smithsonian Institution as she could, but soon extended her research into multiple forms of black roots music, including spirituals, work songs, field hollers, and slave songs. This was the beginning of her career as a self-taught ethnomusicologist. Tillery gathered music from small churches, cotton fields and the "freedom music" of her ancestors. She performed research at the Schomberg Center for Research in Black Culture in New York, and was introduced to the ethnomusicology studies of Eileen Southern and Bernice Johnson Reagon. She also wanted to talk to the musicians themselves, so she travelled to the sea islands of South Carolina and Georgia to find performers of traditional Gullah music.

After that revelatory evening via PBS and gathering initial material, Tillery approached a friend who directed a youth choir, as well as thirteen musician friends, and they put together a concert of spirituals in Oakland, California to test the response. The feedback was overwhelmingly positive, with Tillery being "flooded" with letters from fans saying how much the music had touched them. After that experimental concert in 1991, Tillery decided she would continue on this path and she formed the Cultural Heritage Choir in 1992. The original group consisted of six women, but soon settled into a five-member voice and percussion ensemble featuring Tillery, Rhonda Benin, Elouise Burrell, Melanie DeMore, and Emma Jean Foster-Fiege, who all lived within a 15-mile radius of Tillery's Oakland home.

Cultural Heritage Choir (CHC) performances often feature the musicians wearing colorful robes and hats from Nigeria, Ghana and Sierra Leone, while performing songs, chants, children's play songs, folk tales, field hollers, percussion and dance. The instrumentation often consists of hand drums, tambourines, gourds, bells, and "pounding sticks" to keep the rhythm. The Choir has a repertoire of 60 to 70 songs. The traditional arrangements of many of the songs were for one or two people with perhaps hand claps as percussion. Tillery chooses the material and has arranged about 95 percent of the music for the five-part choir.

Tillery calls the music performed by the CHC "survival music". She says "it helped African-Americans endure Jim Crow, lynchings, rapes. The music carried them forward". Also, Tillery says "These songs and the consciousness of them will actually save me in the end. They don't cost any money, they're interactive, I can do them with other people, they're not violent, they don't express destruction or disrespect of anyone or anything, and that's an unbeatable combination".

Tillery says that the CHC's music is 100 percent black, but "75 percent of the audience is white and 25 percent will be African American or other…. It's a hard thing to explain. We deal with a lot of what is typically called 'slave music.' And I suppose that there are some people who just want to forget that period of time and the events that occurred. However, I have found that the byproduct of slavery, the art that came out of that particularly dreadful time, to be absolutely stimulating and exciting. And sometimes I wonder why it is not as exciting to other African Americans".

Tillery said that from the inception of the CHC, "the educational aspect would be the most important part of this…. A lot of people never knew, or have forgotten, the origin of some of our most important music in this country. Many of the songs we hold near and dear today are actually spirituals".

It was Tillery's intention when she founded the choir that it remain all-female, although men appeared on the group's recordings. But Foster-Fiege left the band in 2002, and after many substitute singers performed with the group, Tillery said she was "looking for a particular kind of voice, a particular kind of singer and someone who had a background in traditional music". She found that voice in 2003 in Lamont Van Hook, the group's first male performer, who brought an Al Green-like falsetto to the group's vocal arsenal. Van Hook had toured for several years as a background singer for Rod Stewart. Tillery had decided by that time that the gender issue was no longer as important as it once was. "What I really wanted was really good singers and good musicians. And folks we could get along with". The second male performer was added in 2005 when Simon Monserrat joined the group, bringing his vast knowledge of Afro-Caribbean rhythms. The group has also added more contemporary music to their repertoire and has become "less myopic". Other men have been members of the choir since 2005 including Bryan Dyer, but the core original members of Tillery, Benin and Burrell have remained in the lineup consistently over the years. DeMore left the choir around 2009, and her chair was filled by Tammi Brown.

The Cultural Heritage Choir has performed all across the United States and in 13 countries. The group has become "an institution at many folk festivals". Tillery has stated that "what I love most of all are international music festivals because they provide me with an opportunity to see and hear what's going on in the rest of the world....It's amazing how much music there is and most people don't get to hear or take the time to hear the stuff that doesn't get played on the radio unless they're tuned into some kind of network".

The Cultural Heritage Choir united with wall dancers Bandaloop to perform I'll Fly Away, a dance piece based on the African-American folk tale of slaves flying back to Africa. CHC provided the soundtrack to the wall dancing of Bandaloop. The performance was a one-night stand at San Francisco's Fort Point. The entrance to the fort was converted to the swaying deck of a slave ship, and the story played out over the fort walls. They only performed it once due to production costs.

From 2005–2007, Linda Tillery & The Cultural Heritage Choir with Black Voices (UK), composed and arranged A Long Way Home: Concertizing the Golden Triangle for San Francisco International Arts Festival.

=== Recordings ===
As of 2009, Linda Tillery and the Cultural Heritage Choir have released six albums, including two children's albums. All were produced or co-produced by Tillery, and she provided the majority of the song arrangements.

Their debut CD Good Time, A Good Time was self-published in 1995, with Carlos Santana describing the recording as "a truly landmark project with historical value".

The Choir's second recording was Front Porch Music, released in 1997 on the EarthBeat! label. Their next release on the same label was a 2001 live recording titled Say Yo' Business that included guest appearances by Wilson Pickett, Laura Love, Richie Havens, Odetta, Kelly Joe Phelps, Eric Bibb and Kitka. In 2009, the Choir returned to self-publishing with the release of Still We Sing, Still We Rise.

The group issued two children's albums on the Music for Little People label. 1997 saw the release of Shakin' a Tailfeather with Taj Mahal and Eric Bibb, which was nominated for a 1998 Grammy Award for Best Musical Album for Children. The recording Hippity Hop with Taj Mahal, Eric Bibb, Sheila E., Maria Muldaur, and Shinehead was released in 1999.

== Expanding collaborations ==
In addition to her solo, session work, women's music, and Cultural Heritage Choir careers, Tillery has collaborated with many other artists in various genres including music, theater, radio, film, and television. She has also taught classes and workshops as part of her role as an "activist educator".

In 1987, Tillery performed with Danny Glover in the live National Public Radio production of the musical Jukebox.

Tillery was a founding member of Bobby McFerrin's 10-person ensemble Voicestra, including performing on the soundtrack of Common Threads: Stories from the Quilt (1989). During her seven-year stint with Voicestra, she appeared on many television shows including The Arsenio Hall Show, Johnny Carson's The Tonight Show, CBS This Morning, The Today Show, and Entertainment Tonight as well as concerts with the Boston Pops, and at the Black Filmmakers Hall of Fame, and the Tokyo Music Festival. Of Tillery's contributions to Voicestra, McFerrin said in 2015: "If I was the heart of Voicestra, Linda was the soul". Tillery formally studied voice with McFerrin for several years, learning about vocal layering and dynamics.

Tillery has appeared in music videos for Bobby McFerrin's The Garden (1990) and Big Bear-Earth Project's Will the Circle Be Unbroken (1990). She was also in a Burger King television commercial in 1990.

In 1992, she recorded the soundtrack for the play Letters from a New England Negro, written by poet/novelist Sherley Anne Williams.

Tillery performed on the soundtracks of several films by director Marlon Riggs: Color Adjustment (1992), Fear of Disclosure (1992), Black is... Black Ain't (1994), and No Regrets (1993).

She also appeared in VH1 specials with Bobby McFerrin and the Kenny Loggins band.

Tillery was hired in 1992 as a special consultant to Redwood Records' New Spirituals Project, which each year commissioned a female composer to create a "new spiritual". Tillery sang with the Project every year in concerts held over the Thanksgiving weekend in Oakland, California. Some of the commissioned works were later performed by other choirs across the country, including the Boys Choir of Harlem and MUSE, The Cincinnati Women's Choir.

She created and performed the music for the dance Invisible Wings, with choreographer Joanna Haigood. The dance was commissioned by Jacob's Pillow in 1998 and was the result of three years of research and collaboration between Haigood, Tillery as musical director, and storyteller Diane Ferlatte. It tells the story of Jacob's Pillow as a stop on the Underground Railroad, and was revived in August 2007 for the finale of Jacob's Pillow Festival's 75th anniversary season. The 2007 performance included Tillery and members of the Cultural Heritage Choir, and portions of the dance were included on a DVD about the festival titled Never Standing Still: Dancing at Jacob's Pillow (2012).

Tillery and Haigood with the Zaccho Dance Theater teamed up again on October 19, 2008 for a one-time performance of It Takes Two To Tango at Miraflores Winery in Pleasant Valley, California. The performance celebrated the history of the tango and its blending of African rhythms with Argentine milonga music, influenced by the intermixing of African, Spanish, Italian, British, Polish, Russian, and native Argentinian cultures in Buenos Aires.

Linda Tillery and the Cultural Heritage Choir were the artists-in-residence at the Cache Valley Arts Festival (Utah) in 2004.

Tillery was the featured vocalist at a March 13, 2005 concert in Sacramento, California to celebrate the 100th anniversary of the birth of composer Harold Arlen. She was accompanied by the 71-piece Sacramento Philharmonic Orchestra on two seldom-sung Arlen songs, "A Sleepin' Bee" and "I Had Myself a True Love".

In May 2005, Tillery and the Cultural Heritage Choir collaborated with Deborah Vaughan, founder and artistic director of Dimensions Dance Theater to create a performance called Spirits Uplifted I, which celebrates the positive aspects of Oakland, California. "The city gets such a bad rap. Not enough is focused on what is positive in Oakland" said Vaughan about the work.

In 2011, Tillery acted as musical director for a Bay Area production of August Wilson's play Seven Guitars.

Also in 2011, multi-instrumentalist musician Barbara Higbie was the first artist-in-residence at the prominent Bay Area music venue Yoshi's, and she invited her friends Laurie Lewis and Linda Tillery to see what would happen if the three musicians from disparate backgrounds performed together. The initial concert was dubbed as "Hills to Hollers", and it was such a success that the three women put together a tour and released a live album in 2012. The main idea behind the project was to get together as a "trio thing exploring roots music from the time when America was a much more rural country and black and white music was much more blended". The collaboration "fuses the bluegrass sounds of the Kentucky rolling hills with the hills and field hollers of the Mississippi Delta".

Tillery collaborated with vocalist Molly Holm to create the music for the play black odyssey, a modern-day retelling of Homer's Odyssey representing "ancient Greek mythology thrust upon the high seas of the African-American experience", written by Marcus Gardley and produced by the California Shakespeare Theater in 2017. The initial run of the play was so successful that Cal Shakes reprised the production in fall 2018.

In July 2017, Tillery reconnected with Mary Watkins, Vicki Randle, Diane Lindsay and other musicians in a "Womanly Way Reunion Band" performance at the National Women's Music Festival. The reunion band then toured to celebrate the 40th anniversary of Tillery's Olivia Records album that featured the song "Womanly Way".

In September 2018, Tillery and former Meters drummer Zigaboo Modeliste teamed up in a "Bay Area funk supergroup" and appeared as festival headliners to celebrate the 50th anniversary of The Freight and Salvage music venue in Berkeley, California.

=== Activist educator ===
Putting her ethnomusicological research to work in educational settings, Tillery was a visiting scholar and taught classes at Stanford University in 2009, as well as at Williams College. In 2011, Tillery was a research assistant at Indiana University Bloomington, as well as a member of the National Advisory Board for the Archives of African American Music & Culture in the Department of Folklore and Ethnomusicology at IU.

She and fellow musician Teresa Trull were guest lecturers at a San Francisco State University class on women's music taught by Angela Davis.

In June 2003, Tillery gave the keynote speech at the Phenomenon of Singing International Symposium IV, in Newfoundland, Canada titled "The Voice as an Instrument of Peace and Motivating Force for Justice".

Tillery was a presenter at the November 2009 "Reclaiming the Right to Rock Conference" at Indiana University.

Tillery wrote the foreword to the scholarly book Songs in Black and Lavender: Race, Sexual Politics, and Women's Music by Eileen M. Hayes (University of Illinois Press, 2010).

From February 2013 to the present, she has been a visiting lecturer and artist at the San Francisco Jazz Center, where she conducts workshops on the Music of the African Diaspora.

== Personal life ==
Tillery is openly lesbian. A 2015 news story identified her partner as Ann Jefferson, director of Community Life and Spiritual Care at Pacific School of Religion.

As she has aged, Tillery has been open about her health problems. She has had a stroke and a malignant abdominal tumor. She has had both knees replaced for which a benefit concert was held in June 2012 at Berkeley's The Freight and Salvage venue to help with her medical expenses, which featured artists Tuck & Patti, the Wayne Wallace Quintet, Faye Carol, and the Ray Obiedo Group. She had bilateral carpal tunnel surgery and has back issues. She has used crutches since her knee surgery but views that with characteristic humor: if Itzhak Perlman can "drag himself onstage on his crutches, sit down and play his ass off", then I can deal with my physical challenges as well. In July 2020, a GoFundMe account was set up to help with Tillery's medical expenses.

On September 2, 2023, Tillery celebrated her 75th birthday with a concert at The Freight and Salvage. Tillery performed two sets, one each with the Freedom Band and the Chocolate Psychedelic Band. The event was also live-streamed. She appeared in a wheelchair, and during a break between songs Tillery discussed her experiences with heart surgery.

Her younger brother Calvin Tillery is also a vocalist. They have recorded together on Coke Escovedo's album Coke (1975), and on Linda Tillery and the Freedom Band's album Celebrate the King (2012).

== Awards and recognition ==
- Jammie (Bay Area Jazz Award) winner, Outstanding Female Vocalist for Sweet Linda Divine (1970)
- Bammie (Bay Area Music Award) winner for Linda Tillery (1977)
- National Association of Independent Record Distributors (NAIRD), Best Independent Music Award (1986)
- Grammy Award nominee, Best Musical Album for Children, Shakin' a Tailfeather, 1998
- American Library Association, Notable Children's Recordings, Shakin' a Tailfeather, 1998
- Parents' Choice "Gold" winner, Shakin' a Tailfeather, 1998
- Parent's Choice "Gold" winner, Hippity Hop, 2000
- California Music Award nominee, Say Yo' Business, 2003
- Community Leadership Award, San Francisco Foundation, 2014 and 2015
- Women's Cancer Resource Center, San Francisco, Compassionate Healer Award 2015
- Arhoolie Award, Arhoolie Foundation, 2019
- "Linda Tillery Day" jointly declared by the cities of San Francisco, Oakland and Berkeley on September 29, 2023

== Discography ==
=== Solo ===
Album title	Record label	Stock number	Release year
Sweet Linda Divine	CBS Records	CS 9771	1970
Linda Tillery	Olivia Records	BLF917	1977
Secrets	411/Redwood Records	BLF 736	1985
Shake It To the One That You Love the Best (with Taj Mahal)	Music for Little People	MLP-661	1989, reissued on CD in 1994 with stock number 2211
Hills to Hollers: Live! (with Barbara Higbie and Laurie Lewis)	Slow Baby	CD8-22203	2012

=== The Loading Zone ===
Album title	Record label	Stock number	Release year
The Loading Zone	RCA Records	LSP 3959	1968, reissued on CD 2001 (UK)
One for All	Umbrella Records	101	1970

=== Linda Tillery and The Cultural Heritage Choir ===
Album title	Record label	Stock number	Release year
Good Time, A Good Time	Tuizer Music	BLHCD746	1995
Front Porch Music	EarthBeat! Records	R2 72881	1997
Shakin' a Tailfeather (with Taj Mahal and Eric Bibb)	Music for Little People	RS72940	1997
Hippity Hop (with Taj Mahal, Eric Bibb, Sheila E., Maria Muldaur, Shinehead)	Music for Little People	R2 75951	1999
Say Yo' Business	EarthBeat! Records	R2 76762	2001
Still We Sing, Still We Rise	Tuizer Music	CHC 09	2009

=== Linda Tillery and the Freedom Band ===
Album title	Record label	Stock number	Release year
Celebrate the King	Round Whirled Records	RWR0042	2012

=== Singles and EPs ===
Song title(s)	Album title	Record label	Stock number	Release year	Note(s)
"Good Day Sunshine"/"Same Time Same Place"	Sweet Linda Divine	Columbia	4-44954	<unknown>	Radio station promo copy 7", 45 RPM
"Womanly Way"/"Markin' Time"	Linda Tillery	Olivia	BLF918	1978	7", 45 RPM
"Secrets" (radio mix)/"Secrets" (extended mix)	Secrets	411/Redwood Records	BLF 777	1985	7", 45 RPM
"Special Kind of Love" (dance remix)/"Special Kind of Love" (radio remix)/"Secrets" (extended mix)	<n/a>	411/Redwood Records	BLF-939	1986	12", 45 RPM

=== Various artist compilation albums ===
Album title	Record label	Stock number	Release year	Song title(s)
Any Woman's Blues	Any Woman's Blues	AWB-415	1976	"Hold It Up" (with Jeanette Lazam, Barbara B.G. Glass, Pat Parker, and Anita Taylor)
Lesbian Concentrate	Olivia	LF915	1977	"Don't Pray for Me"
Michigan Live '85	August Night	MF 010	1986	"Love and Happiness"
That's Timeless Soul	Timeless Records/Stomp Records (Germany)	TLCD 9.00422E	1988	"Secrets"
People Want Music	Timeless Records (UK)	PWM 1	1989	"Secrets"
Music Lovers Choice Vol. 5: Modern Soul & Jazz	Technics (UK)	TCD 005	<unknown>	"Secrets"
Der Sampler 31	Line Records (Germany)	LICD 9.00621 J	1989	"Fever"
Freedom Time	Counterpoint Records (UK)	CDCR004	1997	"Freedom Time"
California Soul	Luv N' Haight/Ubiquity	LHCD039	2002	"Freedom Time"
Soul Divas	Wagram Music (France)	3135302	2008	"Freedom Time"
ESP DJ Classics Vol. 3: Feeling of Freedom	ESP DJ Classics (Japan)	ESP-DJCD-003	2009	"Freedom Time"
A Good Example of What It Is	Higher Learning (Europe)	AVL97276	<unknown>	"Freedom Time"
A Child's Celebration of Lullaby	Music for Little People	R2 72935	1997	"Singin' In My Heart" (with Eric Bibb)
Celebration of Family	Music for Little People	R2 78932	2001	"Singin' In My Heart" (with Eric Bibb)
Singin' In My Heart	Music for Little People	R2 78292	2002	"Singin' In My Heart" (with Eric Bibb)
Sweet Slumbers: Soothing Lullabies for Kids	Music for Little People	R2 524464	2010	"Singin' In My Heart" (with Eric Bibb)
Night Train: Classic Railroad Songs, Volume 3	Rounder Records	CD 1144	1998	"Rock Island Line" (with The Cultural Heritage Choir)
A Child's Celebration of Silliest Songs	Music for Little People	R2 75953	1999	"Beans and Cornbread" (with Taj Mahal)
Giggling & Laughing: Silly Songs for Kids	Music for Little People	R2 524463	2010	"Beans and Cornbread" (with Taj Mahal)
Festival Mundial Live 3	Festival Mundial (Netherlands)	AMR 9099503	1999	"Down the Line (Texas Prison Work Song)" (with The Cultural Heritage Choir)
Musicworks 75: On The Brink Of A New Millennium	Musicworks (Canada)	MW 75	1999	"Boll Weevil Blues" (with The Cultural Heritage Choir)
Simply Soul Flavas Part II	First Experience Records (UK)	FER CD2	1999	"Love For Love" (with Claytoven)
A Child's Celebration of Soul	Music for Little People	R2 79962	2000	"Name Game" (with The Cultural Heritage Choir)
15th Anniversary Collection: Celebrating 15 Years of the Best in Children's Music	Music for Little People	R2 79797	2000	"Shake A Tail Feather" (with Taj Mahal)
Brown Girl in the Ring	Music for Little People	R2 74283	2001	"Follow the Drinking Gourd" (with Eric Bibb and Taj Mahal)
This Land Is Your Land: Songs of Unity	Music for Little People	R2 78142	2002	"Follow the Drinking Gourd" (with Eric Bibb and Taj Mahal)
Sweet Slumbers: Soothing Lullabies for Kids	Music for Little People	R2 524464	2010	"Follow the Drinking Gourd" (with Eric Bibb and Taj Mahal)
Funk 80 Only The Best Rare Tracks Volume 2	U.K Records (France)	<unknown>	2007	"Count On Me"
Love Is The Song We Sing (San Francisco Nuggets 1965-1970)	Rhino Records	R2 165564	2007	"The Bells" (with The Loading Zone)
Rock & Roll Playground	Putumayo Kids	PUT 302-2	2010	"Willie and the Hand Jive" (with Taj Mahal)
Pickin' & Grinnin': Great Folk Songs for Kids	Music for Little People	R2 522898	2010	"Shortnin' Bread" (with The Cultural Heritage Choir)
Volcov Edits	ESP DJ Classics (Japan)	<unknown>	2010	"Makin' Time (Volcov cut)"

=== Producer credits ===
Album title	Album artist(s)	Record label	Stock number	Release year	Note(s)
Be Be K'Roche	Be Be K'Roche	Olivia	LF906	1976	all songs co-arranged by Tillery
The Ways A Woman Can Be	Teresa Trull	Olivia	LF 910	1977	
Linda Tillery	Linda Tillery	Olivia	BLF917	1977	
Secrets	Linda Tillery	411/Redwood Records	BLF 736	1985	Executive co-producer with Ray Obiedo; producer on selected tracks
City Down	Casselberry-DuPreé	Icebergg Records	ICE 215	1986	Executive producer
Good Time, A Good Time	Linda Tillery and the Cultural Heritage Choir	Tuizer Music	BLHCD746	1995	Produced and arranged by Tillery
Front Porch Music	Linda Tillery and the Cultural Heritage Choir	EarthBeat! Records	R2 72881	1997	Produced and arranged by Tillery
Shakin' a Tailfeather	Linda Tillery and the Cultural Heritage Choir, with Taj Mahal and Eric Bibb	Music for Little People	R2 72940	1997	Musical direction and arrangements by Tillery; co-produced with Leib Ostrow
Hippity Hop	Linda Tillery and the Cultural Heritage Choir, with various artists	Music for Little People	R2 75951	1999	Musical direction by Tillery; co-produced with Leib Ostrow
Sugar Mama	Gwen Avery	Sugar Mama Music	ATGASM1	2000	Produced and co-arranged by Tillery
Say Yo' Business	Linda Tillery and the Cultural Heritage Choir	EarthBeat! Records	R2 76762	2001	
The Vine	Kitka	Diaphonica	DPCD2002	2002	Co-produced with Kit Higginson
Still We Sing, Still We Rise	Linda Tillery and the Cultural Heritage Choir	Tuizer Music	CHC 09	2009	Co-produced with Simon Monserrat
Celebrate the King	Linda Tillery and The Freedom Band	Round Whirled Records	RWR0042	2012	Co-produced with Camilo Landau

=== Songwriter credits ===
Song title	Album artist(s)	Album title	Record label	Stock number	Release year
"Celebrate the King"	Linda Tillery and The Freedom Band	Celebrate the King	Round Whirled Records	RWR0042	2012
"Freedom Time" (co-written with Mary Watkins)	Linda Tillery	Linda Tillery	Olivia	BLF917	1977
"Freedom Time" (co-written with Mary Watkins)	Linda Tillery and The Freedom Band	Celebrate the King	Round Whirled Records	RWR0042	2012
"I'm So Thankful"	Linda Tillery	Secrets	411/Redwood Records	BLF 736	1985
"In Praise of Freedom"	Linda Tillery and The Freedom Band	Celebrate the King	Round Whirled Records	RWR0042	2012
"In the Name of Love"	Linda Tillery and The Freedom Band	Celebrate the King	Round Whirled Records	RWR0042	2012
"Maracatú" (co-written with Airto Moreira, Giovanni Hidalgo, Joey Blake, Mickey Hart, and Rhonda Benin)	Kodō	Mondo Head	Red Ink	WK56111	2002
"Remember the Ones" (co-written with Eric Bibb and Ulrika Ponten)	Eric Bibb	Blues People	Stony Plain (Canada)	SPCD 1379	2014
"What Are You Under" (co-written with Joe Rubino)	Coke Escovedo	Coke	Mercury Records	SRM-1-1041	1975
"Womanly Way" (co-written with Mary Watkins and Diane Lindsay)	Linda Tillery	Linda Tillery	Olivia	BLF917	1977
"Wonderful"	Linda Tillery	Linda Tillery	Olivia	BLF917	1977

=== Guest appearance credits ===
Album title	Artist(s)	Record label	Stock number	Release year	Role
Santana III	Santana	Columbia Records	KC 30595	1971	backing vocals
My Time	Boz Scaggs	Columbia Records	PC 31384	1972	background vocals
Lights Out: San Francisco (various artist compilation album)	Tower of Power	Blue Thumb Records	BTS 6004	1972	background vocals
Cesar	Cesar 830	Flying Dutchman Records	BDL 1-0830	1975	vocals
Coke	Coke Escovedo	Mercury Records	SRM-1-1041	1975	lead vocals
Be Be K'Roche	Be Be K'Roche	Olivia Records	LF906	1976	backup vocals/percussion
Songwriter	Margie Adam	Pleiades Records	HB2747	1976	drums
Big City	Lenny White	Nemperor Records	NE 441	1977	vocals
Disco Fantasy	Coke Escovedo	Mercury Records	SRM-1-1132	1977	lead vocals
Face The Music	Meg Christian	Olivia	LF913	1977	drums/backing vocals
The Ways A Woman Can Be	Teresa Trull	Olivia	LF 910	1977	drums/supporting vocals
Giants	Giants (3)	LAX Records	MCA 3188	1978	vocals
Imagine My Surprise	Holly Near	Redwood Records	RR 401	1978	drums
Something Moving	Mary Watkins	Olivia	BLF 919	1978	drums/percussion/backing vocals
Let It Be Known	Teresa Trull	Olivia	LF923	1980	drums/supporting vocals
Heartsong	June Millington	Fabulous Records	LF929	1981	backing vocals
Sneakin' Out	Stacy Lattisaw	Cotillion Records	90002-1	1982	backing vocals
Night Rainbow	Gayle Marie	Gayleo Music	GM 001	1982	backing vocals
At Carnegie Hall	Meg Christian / Cris Williamson	Olivia	LF933	1983	supporting vocals
The Island	Pete Escovedo	EsGo Records	EG 001	1983	vocals
Tiggi Clay	Tiggi Clay	Morocco Records	6067CL	1984	backing vocals
Something To Go On	Nancy Vogl	Redwood	RR 3000	1984	vocals
Open Up	Diane Lindsay	Cityscape Records	CS1111	1984	backing vocals
Restitution (EP)	Rob Banks	Credit Records	credit 001	1984	backing vocals
It's Your Body (EP)	Sonny Padilla JR	Uno Records	UNO-585-12	1985	backing vocals
Don't Doubt It	Deidre McCalla	Olivia	LF 939	1985	backing vocals
City Down	Casselberry-DuPreé	Icebergg Records	ICE 215	1986	vocal support
Harmony	Hunter Davis	Redwood	RR8601	1986	backing vocals
The Power Of My Love For You	Susan Savell	Heartlight Records	HR 325	1986	backing vocals
Understated	The Washington Sisters	SHSAWA Music	SHSA221CD	1987	backing vocals/body percussion/hand claps/tambourine
With A Little Luck	Deidre McCalla	Olivia	LF 953	1987	backing vocals
Don't Hold Back	Holly Near	Redwood	RR 413	1987	vocals
Torn	Hunter Davis	Redwood	RR8803	1988	supporting vocals/hand claps
Medicine Music	Bobby McFerrin	EMI USA	E4-92048	1990	vocals
Singer In The Storm	Holly Near	Chameleon Records	D4-74832	1990	vocals
Milagro	Santana	Polydor Records	314 513 197-2	1992	vocals
Wooden Boat	Keola Beamer	Dancing Cat Records	08022-38024-2	1994	backing vocals
Four Chords & Several Years Ago	Huey Lewis and the News	Elektra Records	61500-2	1994	backing vocals
By The Fireside	Turtle Island String Quartet	Windham Hill Records	01934 11175-2	1995	backing vocals
Round Trip	Rebeca Mauleón	Bembe Records	2023	1999	vocals
Sugar Mama	Gwen Avery	Sugar Mama Music	ATGASM1	2000	backup vocals
The Vine	Kitka	Diaphonica	DPCD2002	2002	percussion/cajon/djembe
Mondo Head	Kodō	Red Ink	WK56111	2002	voice
Songs From The Southland	Hans Theessink	Blue Grove Records (Austria)	BG-0061	2003	backing vocals
Sleep City	Vicki Randle	Wolf Moon	WMR65410	2006	background vocals
Yes We Can!	Maria Muldaur and Women's Voices for Peace Choir	Telarc International	CD-83672	2008	vocals (with Bonnie Raitt)
Chapter Two	HE3 Project	Family Groove Records	FG-4000	2010	backing vocals
Is It True (EP)	The Ruminators	Jackalope Records	JKLP 1266	2011	backing vocals
Winter In America (EP)	Bill Ortiz	Left Angle Records	LAR006	2012	featured vocals
Jericho Road	Eric Bibb	Stony Plain Recordings (Canada)	SPCD 1370	2013	backing vocals
Blues People	Eric Bibb	Stony Plain (Canada)	SPCD 1379	2014	featured vocals
Kindred Lines	T Sisters	Spruce and Maple Music	SMM 1010	2014	percussion
Global Griot	Eric Bibb	Dixiefrog Records	DFGCD 8810	2018	featured vocals

== Films ==
- Roseland (directed by Fredric Hobbs, 1971); Tillery appears as the lead vocalist of The Loading Zone
- Tryin' To Get Home: A History of African American Song (written and performed by Kerrigan Black for Heebie Jeebie Music, 1993, VHS); Tillery is credited with "Narration of biography"
- Black is... Black Ain't (directed by Marlon Riggs, copyright Signifyin' Works, 1995; includes a brief singing scene with Tillery, a brief speaking role for Tillery, and she performs three songs on the soundtrack ("We Shall Overcome", "We Shall Not Be Moved", and "Lift Every Voice and Sing") with the Harriet Tubman Underground Freedom Train Singers. Distributed by California Newsreel.
- Radical Harmonies (directed by Dee Mosbacher, Woman Vision, 2002, DVD); includes multiple interview scenes with Tillery and some performance footage
- Never Stand Still: Dancing at Jacob's Pillow (directed by Ron Honsa, First Run Features, 2012, DVD); Tillery is listed in credits as Featured Artist; includes a few short interview scenes with Tillery and some performance footage of the dance "Invisible Wings" for which Tillery was music director and Cultural Heritage Choir performed the music
