= Woodside High School (California) =

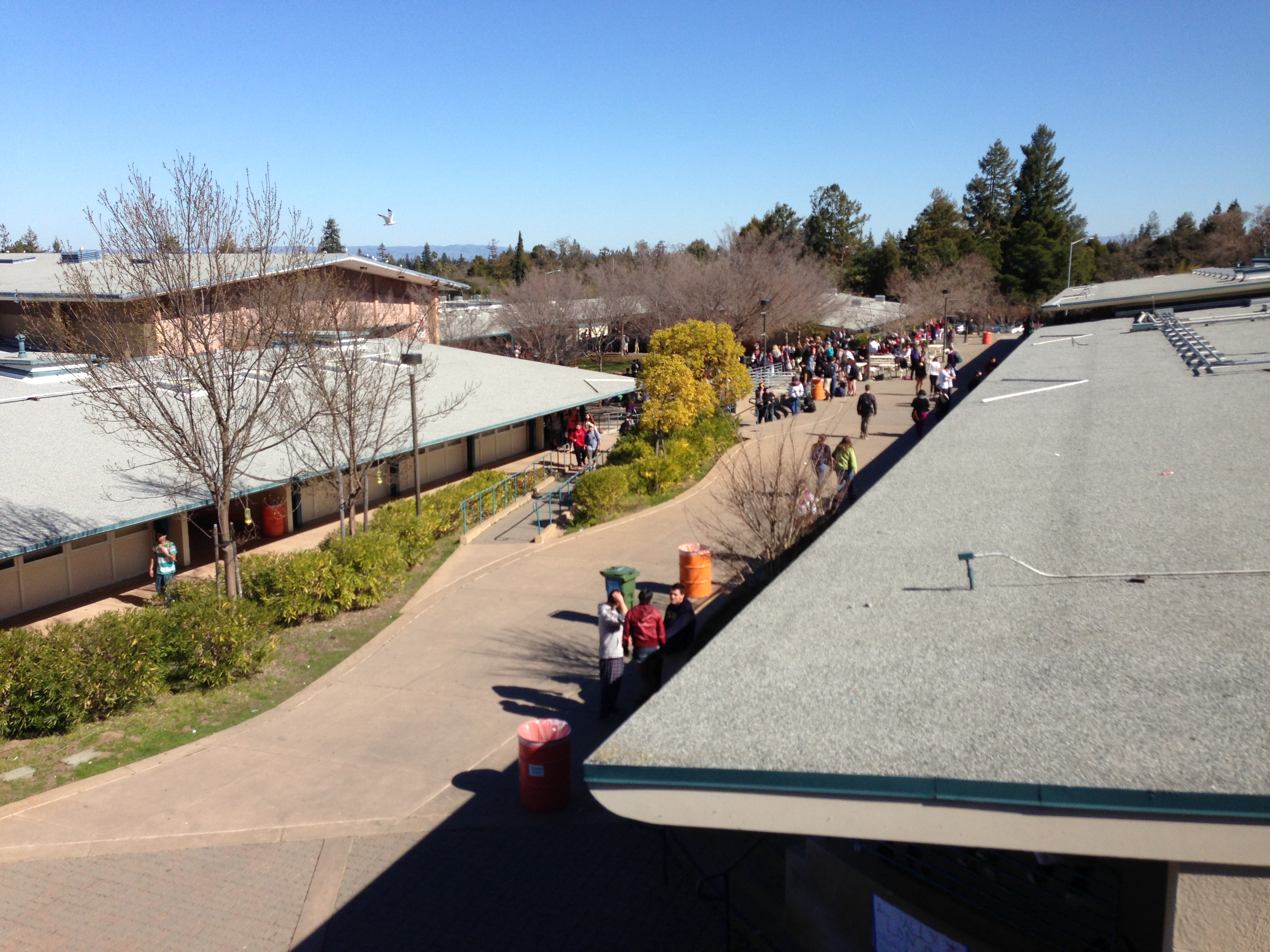
- A view of Woodside looking toward the main quad

Location
- 199 Churchill Rd; Woodside, California 94062; United States; 37°26′40″N 122°13′55″W

Information
- Type: Comprehensive public high school
- Established: 1958
- School district: Sequoia Union High School District
- CEEB code: 053808
- Principal: Karen Van Putten
- Staff: 98.46 (FTE)
- Grades: 9–12
- Enrollment: 1,646 (2023–2024)
- Student to teacher ratio: 16.72
- Campus type: Suburban
- Colors: Orange, black, and white
- Fight song: Sons of Westwood
- Mascot: Wilbur the Wildcat
- Nickname: Wildcats
- Rivals: Sequoia High School
- Newspaper: The Paw Print
- Yearbook: Wildcat
- Website: woodsidehs.org

Woodside High School is a public high school in Woodside, California, United States. It is part of the Sequoia Union High School District (SUHSD). Woodside serves students from the surrounding communities of Portola Valley, Woodside and Redwood City.

== About ==
Woodside High School first opened in September 1958. The school was first designed by Menlo Park architect Peter Kump, and originally included 40 classrooms. The school's first principal was Willard Bradley, who was previously the principal of the Menlo-Atherton Adult Evening School.

Woodside's campus is 34 acres. As of 2024-2025, the school has 1,670 students and offers 83 elective classes and 20 AP or honors classes.

As of 2024-2025, Woodside has 59 student-run clubs, including a Folklórico Club, an AAPI club, and a record label club "1.99 Records".

== Athletics ==
The school's football team won the California Interscholastic Federation's Central Coast Section title in 2004.

More recently, the school's girls' soccer team won the California Interscholastic Federation's Central Coast Section title in 2011 in a 0–0 tie with Santa Teresa High School.

== Statistics ==
=== Demographics ===
2015–2016

- 1,781 students: 862 male (48.4%), 919 female (51.6%)

Hispanic	White	Asian	Two or more races	African American	Pacific Islander	Filipino	American Indian	Not reported
990	579	44	42	36	24	20	6	40
55.6%	32.5%	2.5%	2.4%	2%	1.3%	1.1%	0.3%	2.2%

=== Standardized testing ===
SAT scores for 2014–2015
	Critical Reading average	Math average	Writing average
Woodside High	500	510	499
District	544	563	544
Statewide	489	500	484

2013 Academic Performance Index
2009 base API	2013 growth API	Growth in the API from 2009 to 2013
750	758	8

== Notable alumni ==
- Jill Aguilera, professional footballer who plays as a midfielder
- Donald B. Ayer, (class of 1967), former United States Deputy Attorney General
- Renel Brooks-Moon (class of 1976), San Francisco Giants baseball announcer and radio personality, 1972–76
- Wendy Brown, Olympian
- Don Bunce (class of 1967), Rose Bowl winning quarterback who attended Stanford University
- Julian Edelman (class of 2005), wide receiver for Super Bowl champion New England Patriots
- Elise Evans (class of 2022), professional soccer player
- Wendy Haas, vocalist and keyboardist best known for her work with the bands Santana and Azteca
- Rich Kelley, went on to star in basketball at Stanford University from 1972-1975 and played 11 years in the NBA. Was the seventh selection of 1975 NBA draft by the New Orleans Jazz
- Lars Lyssand, soccer player
- Tyler MacNiven (class of 1998), winner of The Amazing Race 9 and filmmaker
- Sean David Morton (class of 1976), incarcerated self-described psychic
- John Naber, former competition swimmer, five-time Olympic medalist
- Folau Niua, professional rugby union player and Olympian with United States national rugby sevens team
- Mike Nolan, longtime college and professional football coach, served as head coach of the San Francisco 49ers from 2005-2008
- Zack Test (class of 2007), professional rugby union player and Olympian with United States national rugby sevens team
- Lillian "Pokey" Watson, Olympic gold medal swimmer, 1964, 1968, International Swimming Hall of Fame

== See also ==
- San Mateo County High Schools
