= Azteca (album) =

Studio album by Azteca
- Released: December 1972
- Recorded: September 1972
- Genres: Latin, funk
- Length: 46:51
- Label: Columbia
- Producers: Coke Escovedo; Azteca

Azteca chronology
Azteca (1972)	Pyramid of the Moon (1973)

Azteca is the debut album by former Santana band members Coke Escovedo and his brother Pete Escovedo with their new band, Azteca.

The album was released by Columbia Records in December 1972 and debuted at No. 178 on the Billboard 200 albums chart on January 13, 1973, peaking at No. 151 on February 17, 1973, and spending nine weeks on the chart.

== Reception ==
Professional ratings
Review scores
Source	Rating
AllMusic	4/5 stars

On the website AllMusic, music critic Stephen Thomas Erlewine wrote:

"In all likelihood, Azteca never would've had a major-label contract if it weren't for Santana, the trailblazing San Franciscan group that made Latin rhythms acceptable. Azteca had a stronger Latin bent than Santana, particularly on this eponymous 1972 debut that is dense with polyrhythms and horns, dipping occasionally into a Cinemascope presentation of saccharine emotions. That sentimentality and on-the-nose celebrations ('You Can't Take the Funk Out of Me'), along with a general hippie-dippy vibe, give the album a period-piece flavor but there is much to savor here, especially in how all involved enjoy playing with the groove, letting it breathe and expand, sometimes happy to let it ride upwards of seven minutes."

In December 1972, Billboard in its review of the album stated "the seventeen man conglomerate boasts, among other assets four fiery vocalists and a four man horn section that cooks to the boiling point. Especially powerful are 'Mamita Linda', 'You Can't Take the Funk Out of Me' and 'Love Not Then'".

Saturday Review of the Arts described it as an "impressive debut album", "featuring a bold, funky sound supported by an accordingly large batch of esteemed players, including graduates of Santana".

== Track listing ==
Side one
No.	Title	Writer(s)	Length
1.	"La Piedra del Sol"	Lenny White III, Tom Harrell	1:13
2.	"Mamita Linda"	James Vincent (Dondelinger), Tom Dondelinger	3:40
3.	"Ain't Got No Special Woman"	Mark Pearson, Rico Reyes, Tom Harrell	3:28
4.	"Empty Prophet"	James Vincent (Dondelinger), Rick Canoff	5:27
5.	"Can't Take the Funk Out of Me"	Paul Jackson	4:22

Side two
No.	Title	Writer(s)	Length
6.	"Peace Everybody"	George DiQuattro, Pete Escovedo	4:30
7.	"Non Pacem"	Flip Núnez	6:39
8.	"Ah! Ah!"	Pete Escovedo, Tito Puente	3:24
9.	"Love Not Then"	Flip Núnez	5:00
10.	"Azteca"	Al Bent	4:45
11.	"Theme: La Piedra del Sol"	Lenny White III, Tom Harrell	1:52

== Personnel ==
Azteca

- Coke Escovedo – Timbales
- Pete Escovedo – Vocals
- Errol Knowles – Vocals
- Wendy Haas – Vocals
- Rico Reyes – Vocals
- Victor Pantoja – Conga drums, Vocals
- Flip Nuñez – Organ
- George Moribus – Electric piano
- George DiQuattro – Piano, Clavinet
- Paul Jackson – Acoustic bass, Electric bass
- Lenny White III – Drums, Vocals
- Neal Schon – Guitar
- Jules Rowell – Valve trombone
- Tom Harrell – Trumpet
- Melvyn Martin – Soprano saxophone, Tenor saxophone, Baritone saxophone, Flute, Piccolo
- Bob Ferreira – Tenor saxophone, Piccolo
- James Vincent (Dondelinger) – Guitar

Production

- Coke Escovedo, Azteca – Producer
- Pete Escovedo – Arranger
- Tom Harrell – Arranger
- George Engfer – recording engineer
- Glen Kolotkin – Engineer
- George Horn – Mastering
- Bruce Steinberg – Design, Artwork, Photography
- Coke Escovedo – Sleeve Notes
