= The Marbles =

The Marbles may refer to:

- The Marbles (duo), a British/Australian duo
- The Marbles (quartet) (1965–1966), an American rock band from San Francisco
