= Comin' at Ya! (album) =

Studio album by Coke Escovedo
- Released: 1976
- Recorded: 1976
- Studios: Different Fur Studios, San Francisco, California
- Genre: Soul
- Label: Mercury
- Producer: Patrick Gleeson

Coke Escovedo chronology
Coke (1975)	Comin' at Ya! (1976)	Disco Fantasy (1977)

Professional ratings
Review scores
Source	Rating
AllMusic	2.5/5 stars

Comin' at Ya! is the second album by former Santana and Azteca band member Coke Escovedo. It was produced by Patrick Gleeson and released in 1976.

== Track listing ==
1. "Diamond Dust / Vida" - (Brian Holland, Coke Escovedo) - 3:03
2. "Something So Simple" - (Mark Phillips, Glenn Symmonds) - 2:34
3. "Stay with Me" - (José Feliciano) - 3:16
4. "Hangin' On" - (Mark Phillips) - 3:18
5. "Somebody's Callin'" - (Glenn Symmonds) - 3:05
6. "The Breeze and I" - (Al Stillman, Ernesto Lecuona) - 1:42
7. "Runaway" - (Errol Knowles) - 2:44
8. "I Wouldn't Change a Thing" - (Johnny Bristol) - 4:31
9. "Backseat" - (Dewayne Sweet, Glenn Symmonds) - 3:39
10. "Everything Is Coming Our Way" - (Carlos Santana) - 3:59
11. "Fried Neck Bones and Home Fries" - (Melvin Latise, William Correa) - 2:15

== Personnel ==
- Coke Escovedo - Percussion, congas, vocals
- Glenn Symmonds - Drums
- Mark Philipps - Bass
- Gábor Szabó, Abel Zarate - Guitar
- Frank Mercurio - Keyboards
- Joe Henderson - Tenor saxophone
- Nathan Rubin and the San Francisco Soul Strings - Strings
- Errol Knowles - Lead vocals
- The Waters Sisters - Backing vocals

== Charts ==
=== Album ===
Chart	Position
Billboard Top LPs	190
Billboard Top Soul LPs	37

== Sampling ==
A sample of about five seconds of the electric guitar on "Hangin' On" is used prominently in the song "Fastlane" by King Geedorah (MF Doom).
