= The Graveyard Five =

American rock band

- Origin: Lakeport, California, United States
- Genres: Garage rock
- Years active: 1967–1969
- Label: Stanco
- Past members: Louis Shriner; Dave Tempelton; Dennis Roller; Steve Kuppinger

The Graveyard Five were an American garage rock band formed in Lakeport, California, in 1967. Musically, the group possessed a haunting and eerie ambiance that was inspired by the ghostly settings of a cemetery. The band upheld an equally spectral image on stage and are best remembered for the song "The Marble Orchard", which has since received substantial notice among garage rock enthusiasts.

== History ==
The band formed in 1967 after a chance encounter between the group members at a convenience store, with a line-up that consisted of Louis Shriner (lead guitar, vocals), Dave Tempelton (drums), Dennis Roller (rhythm guitar), and Steve Kuppinger (bass guitar, vocals). A decision to name the group the Graveyard Five was made when the bandmates experienced an apparent supernatural encounter with the dead, while playing with a ouija board. The unaccounted "fifth member" of the Graveyard Five was a coffin that the group would ceremoniously carry onto the stage prior to performances. Combine with their elaborate light show, the band developed a dark presence in their live performances, with a repertoire that originally contained surf rock-inspired instrumentals. Kuppinger recalled the Graveyard Five's rise to popularity was met with challenges, noting the struggles of performing at "bars where they just were not ready for us. We had fights on the stage and had beer bottles thrown at us while we played. It was some really hard work for very little pay".

Nonetheless, the band soon became a popular live attraction in the Bay Area, opening for Quicksilver Messenger Service, the Loading Zone, and Jefferson Airplane, among others. As a result of winning a battle of the band's competition against another local rock outfit known as the Fatigues, the Graveyard Five earned a recording contract with record producer Stan Sweeney. The band chose original compositions that reflected upon their self-described "graveyard sound", the songs "The Marble Orchard" and "Graveyard Five Theme", for the group's debut single. "The Marble Orchard", an allusion to a cemetery, was penned by Shriner and Kuppinger, quite literally, on an October night in Lakeport's Hartley Cemetery. Kuppinger detailed the song's conception, saying "It was a very stormy night. Lightning. Thunder. We sat in an old Studebaker station wagon, and wrote that song as it happened. The heartbeat in the beginning is me thumping my bass strings. I put a lot of reverb and echo on it and it came out better than the stock heartbeat they had recorded to use. I seem to remember that when Louis asked for the cigarette I handed him a Lucky Strike non-filter, so if you can picture it then that is about what it looked like that night in the cemetery".

In September 1968, "The Marble Orchard" was released on the Stanco record label. Though the song was highly demanded regionally, many of the pressings were destroyed in a fire or by Shriner, while on a LSD-induced trip. A follow-up single, featuring "Stay By My Grave" and "Out of the Night", was intended to be released in early 1969, furthering the Graveyard Five's dark premise. However, Shriner, who had been dealing with the effects of a bad trip, suffered a mental breakdown while the band was touring in Florida. He destroyed the group's equipment in the incident, and the Graveyard Five disbanded before the single could be released. A whole set of material, fit enough for a complete album, was also composed and recorded, but that too has yet to be distributed.

Since its original release, "The Marble Orchard" has become recognized on several compilation albums, including most prominently on Pebbles, Volume 16. An original copy of the Graveyard Five's single fetches sums of up to $4,500, a testament to its collectivity. Some of the band members themselves have experienced allegedly eerily peculiar events after the Graveyard Five: Tempelton was imprisoned, Roller suffers from the damage caused by severe burns to his arms, and Kuppinger is diagnosed with reflex sympathetic dystrophy, which keeps him in a constant state of pain. Shriner currently resides in California.

== Discography ==
=== Single ===
- "The Graveyard Theme" b/w "Marble Orchard" – Stanco Records (SR-102), 1968
