= Coke (album) =

Studio album by Coke Escovedo
- Released: 1975
- Recorded: June–July 1975
- Studios: Wally Heider Studios, San Francisco, CA
- Genre: Soul
- Label: Mercury
- Producer: Patrick Gleeson

Coke Escovedo chronology
Coke (1975)	Comin' at Ya! (1976)

Professional ratings
Review scores
Source	Rating
Allmusic	4/5 stars

Coke is the debut solo album by American percussionist Coke Escovedo, after his stints in the bands Santana and Azteca. The album was produced by Patrick Gleeson and released in 1975.

== Track listing ==
1. "No One to Depend On"
2. "Why Can't We Be Lovers"
3. "Rebirth"
4. "Easy Come Easy Go"
5. "Love Letters"
6. "Hall's Delight"
7. "If I Ever Lose This Heaven"
8. "What Are You Under"
9. "Make It Sweet"
10. "Life is a Tortured Love Affair"

== Personnel ==
- Coke Escovedo - Percussion
- Harvey Mason, Pete Risso - Drums
- Mark Philipps - Bass
- Joe Rubino - Guitar
- Frank Mercurio - Keyboards
- Vince Denim - Saxophone on "Hall's Delight"
- Forrest Buchtel, Mike Kirkhouse, Ron Smith, Vince Denim - Horns
- Joanna Hervig, Miriam Dye, Nathan Rubin, Roy Malan, Teresa Adams - Strings
- Calvin Tillery, Linda Tillery - Lead Vocals
- Julia Tillman, Maxine Willard - Backing Vocals

== Charts ==
Year	Chart	Position
1976	Billboard Top LPs	195
1975	Billboard Top Soul LPs	44
