= Eric Bibb =

American singer-songwriter

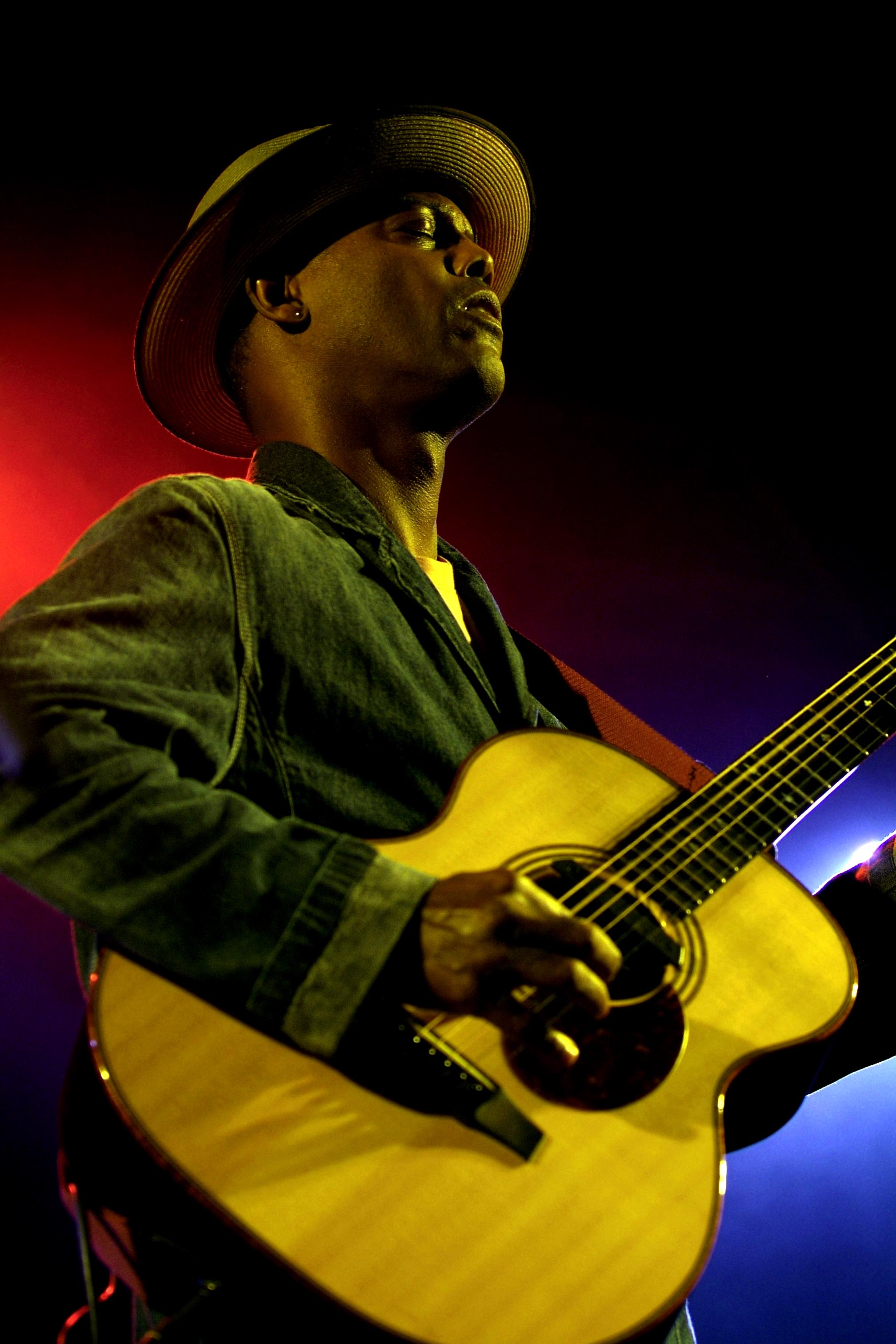
- Eric Bibb in concert

Background information
- Born: Eric Charles Bibb; August 16, 1951 (age 75); New York City, U.S.
- Genres: Americana, folk-blues
- Occupations: Singer, musician
- Instrument: Guitar
- Years active: 1962–present
- Labels: Telarc, ABC, Jericho Beach, Provogue
- Website: ericbibb.com

Eric Charles Bibb (born August 16, 1951) is a Grammy-nominated American-born blues singer and songwriter.

== Early life and education ==
Bibb was born in New York on August 16, 1951. His father, Leon, was a musical theatre singer, who made a name for himself as part of the 1960s New York folk scene; his uncle was the jazz pianist and composer John Lewis, of the Modern Jazz Quartet. Family friends included Pete Seeger, and actor/singer/activist Paul Robeson, Bibb's godfather.

He was given his first steel-string acoustic guitar at the age of eight. Growing up surrounded by talent, he recalls a childhood conversation with Bob Dylan, who, on the subject of guitar playing, advised the 11-year-old Bibb to "Keep it simple, forget all that fancy stuff" (as recounted in "The Transatlantic Sessions 5" program and DVD from the BBC).

Bibb remembers from his early teen years:

I would cut school and claim I was sick. When everyone would leave the house I would whip out all the records and do my own personal DJ thing all day long, playing Odetta, Joan Baez, the New Lost City Ramblers, Josh White.

When Bibb was 16 years old, his father invited him to play guitar in the house band for his TV talent show Someone New. Bill Lee, who played bass in this band, later appeared on Bibb's albums Me To You and Friends. In 1969, Bibb played guitar for the Negro Ensemble Company at St. Mark's Place in New York.

He went on to study psychology and Russian at Columbia University, but did not finish these studies. The next year, aged 19, he left for Paris, where he met guitarist Mickey Baker who focused his interest on blues guitar.

== Career ==
Bibb moved to Stockholm, where he immersed himself in pre-war blues and the newly discovered world music scene, while he continued to write and perform. Good Stuff was released in 1997 on Opus 3 and the American label Earthbeat. Bibb signed to the British-based Code Blue label, but only released one album, Me to You, featuring appearances from some of his personal heroes, Pops and Mavis Staples, and Taj Mahal. This was followed by tours of the UK, US, Canada, France, Sweden and Germany.

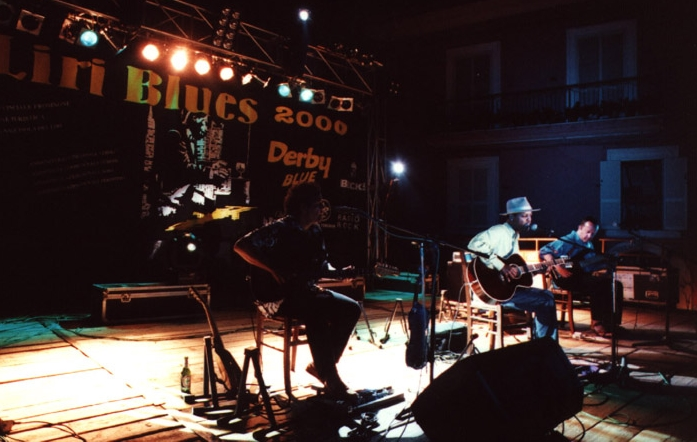
Eric Bibb at the Liri Blues Festival, Italy, in 2000

In the late 1990s Bibb joined forces with his then manager Alan Robinson to form Manhaton Records in Britain. The albums Home to Me (1999), Roadworks (2000) and Painting Signs (2001) followed, as did the 2005 releases for Opus 3, Just Like Love and Spirit & the Blues (Hybrid SACD of 1999 Earthbeat release). After that, he made A Family Affair (2002) with his father, Leon Bibb. This was followed by Natural Light, then Friends, which contained 15 tracks featuring Bibb duetting with friends and musicians he had met on his travels such as Taj Mahal, Odetta, Charlie Musselwhite, Guy Davis, Mamadou Diabate and Djelimady Toukara.

In 2004, Eric Bibb released Friends as his debut release under Telarc International Corporation. Bibb remained with Telarc Records from 2004 until 2011, releasing several additional albums including, A Ship Called Love in 2005, Diamond Days in 2007, and Spirit I Am in 2008. He released Booker's Guitar in January 2010 with music channeled from the Delta blues guitarist, Bukka White. In November 2011, Bibb signed to Stony Plain Records. In 2018, Bibb opened for George Benson on his UK tour.

In March 2021, it was announced that Bibb had signed to Provogue Records. The lead single "Whole World's Got The Blues" featuring Eric Gales from his upcoming album was released on March 19, 2021, with the album Dear America expected on September 10, 2021. Two more singles followed: "Born Of A Woman" with singer Shaneeka Simon on June 10, and "Emmett's Ghost" featuring Ron Carter inspired by the lynching of Emmett Till on July 23, to coincide with what would have been Till's 80th birthday on July 25.

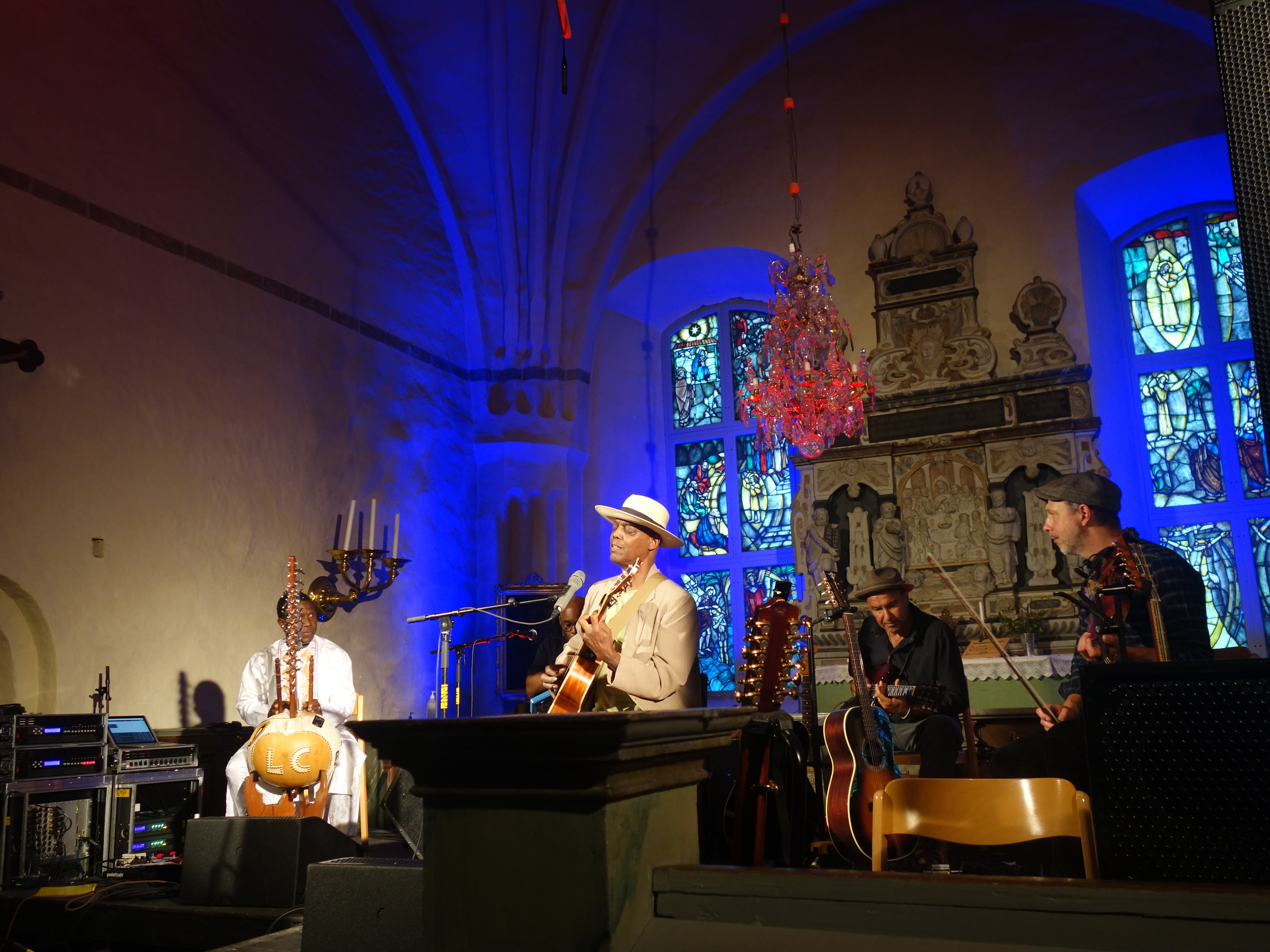
Eric Bibb concert at Rasbo Church, near Uppsala, Sweden, August 14, 2022 (during Rasbo Culture Week)

His 2023 album Ridin' made the Top 10 of several blues and roots charts, and boosted his all-round popularity.

Bibb toured Australia and New Zealand in May and June 2024.

== Awards ==
Bibb received Grammy Award nominations for Shakin' a Tailfeather in 1997 and Migration Blues in 2017.

He has been nominated for several Blues Music Awards (formerly known as the W.C. Handy Awards). He won the award for Acoustic Artist of the Year in 2012 and 2013. In 2017 he won the award for Acoustic Album of the Year for The Happiest Man in the World.

His 2023 album Ridin' was nominated for a Grammy nomination in the Best Traditional Blues Album category.

== Personal life ==
Bibb is married to Ulrika Bibb. Bibb was formerly married to Sari Matinlassi. He lived in Kirkkonummi, Finland, for four years before moving back to Stockholm, Sweden.

== Discography ==
=== Studio albums ===
- Ain't It Grand (MNW, 1972)
- Rainbow People (Opus 3, 1977)
- Golden Apples of the Sun (Opus 3, 1983)
- Me to You (Code Blue, 1997)
- Home to Me (Ruf, 1999)
- Roadworks (Ruf, 2000)
- Just Like Love (Opus 3, 2000)
- Painting Signs (Manhaton/EarthBeat!, 2001)
- Natural Light (Manhaton, 2003)
- A Ship Called Love (Telarc, 2005)
- Diamond Days (Telarc, 2006)
- 12 Gates to the City (Luna, 2006)
- Get On Board (2008)
- Spirit I Am (2008)
- Booker's Guitar (Telarc, 2010)
- Blues Ballads & Work Songs (Opus 3, 2011)
- Deeper in the Well (Stony Plain, 2012)
- Jericho Road (Stony Plain, 2013)
- The Haven (Luna, 2011)
- Blues People (Stony Plain, 2014)
- Migration Blues (2017; nominated for a Grammy as Best Traditional Blues Album)
- Global Griot (double album, 2018)
- Dear America (Provogue, 2021)
- Ridin' (Repute, 2023)
- One Mississippi (Repute, 2026)

=== Collaborative albums ===
- Cyndee Peters & Eric Bibb: Olikalikadant (Caprice, 1978)
- Eric Bibb & Bert Deivert: April Fools (Opus 3, 1979)
- Eric Bibb & Bert Deivert: River Road (Opus 3, 1980)
- Eric Bibb & Friends: Songs for Peace (Opus 3, 1982)
- Eric Bibb & Bert Deivert: Hello Stranger (Opus 3, 1983)
- Cyndee Peters & Eric Bibb: A Collection Of Cyndee Peters & Eric Bibb (Opus 3, 1991)
- Eric Bibb & Needed Time: Spirit & The Blues (Opus 3, 1994)
- Eric Bibb & Needed Time: Good Stuff (Opus 3, 1997)
- Leon & Eric Bibb: A Family Affair (Manhaton, 2002)
- Eric Bibb, Rory Block, & Maria Muldaur: Sisters & Brothers (Telarc, 2004)
- Eric Bibb & Friends: Friends (Telarc, 2004)
- Leon & Eric Bibb: Praising Peace: A Tribute to Paul Robeson (Stony Plain, 2006)
- Habib Koité - Eric Bibb: Brothers in Bamako (Stony Plain, 2012)
- Eric Bibb & Andrew Maxfield: Celebrating Wendell Berry in Music (2013)
- Eric Bibb, Ale Möller & Knut Reiersrud: Blues Detour (2014)
- Eric Bibb & JJ Milteau: Lead Belly's Gold (Dixiefrog, 2015)
- Eric Bibb & North Country Far with Danny Thompson: The Happiest Man In The World (Dixiefrog, 2016)
- Eric Bibb, Ale Möller, Knut Reiersrud, Aly Bain etc.: Jazz At The Berlin Philharmonic - Celtic Roots (ACT, 2016)

=== Live albums ===
- Live at the Basement (2002)
- An Evening with Eric Bibb (2007)
- Live À FIP (a.k.a. Live at FIP) (Dixiefrog, 2009)
- Troubadour Live with Staffan Astner (Telarc, 2011)

=== DVDs ===
- Up Close With Eric Bibb (2008)
- Live At The Basement (2010)
- The Guitar Artistry Of Eric Bibb (2011)

=== Select special appearances and compilations ===
- Cyndee Peters: När Morgonstjärnan Brinner (1987)
- Linda Tillery & The Cultural Heritage Choir, Taj Mahal, & Eric Bibb: Shakin' A Tailfeather (1997)
- Various artists: Jazz FM Presents Absolute Blues (1997)
- Various artists: Bob Harris Presents (Volume 1) (1999)
- Various artists: Hippity Hop (1999)
- Various artists: All You Need Is Love (Beatles Songs For Kids) (1999)
- Various artists: Putumayo Presents Mali To Memphis (An African-American Odyssey) (1999)
- Various artists: Putumayo Presents World Playground (A Musical Adventure For Kids) (1999)
- Various artists: Screamin' & Hollerin' The Blues (2000)
- Various artists: Blue Haze (Songs Of Jimi Hendrix) (2000)
- Jools Holland & His Rhythm & Blues Orchestra: Jools Holland's Big Band Rhythm & Blues (2001)
- Various artists: Putumayo Kids Presents Reggae Playground (2006)
- Eric Bibb: Eric Bibb, A Retrospective ‒ with new studio track, "Trust the Dawn", and live track, "Saucer & Cup" (2006)
- Big Daddy Wilson: Love Is the Key (2009)
