= Painting Signs =

Studio album by Eric Bibb
- Released: 2001
- Genre: Blues
- Label: Manhaton/EarthBeat!
- Producer: Dave Bronze

Eric Bibb chronology
Just Like Love (2000)	Painting Signs (2001)	Natural Light (2003)

Painting Signs is an album by the American-born musician Eric Bibb, released in 2001. It peaked at No. 10 on the UK Jazz & Blues Albums Chart. Bibb supported the album with a UK tour and shows in North America opening for Robert Cray. After the September 11 attacks, "Hope in a Hopeless World" was released as a single, with royalties earmarked for the American Red Cross.

== Production ==
The album was produced by Dave Bronze. "Angel" is a cover of the Jimi Hendrix song. "Honest I Do" was written by Jimmy Reed. "Hope in a Hopeless World" is a version of the Roebuck Staples song; the album is dedicated to him. "Delia's Gone" is an interpretation of the folk song. "I Heard the Angels Singing" was written by Reverend Gary Davis. Wilson Pickett sang on "Don't Ever Let Nobody Drag Your Spirit Down".

== Critical reception ==
Professional ratings
Review scores
Source	Rating
AllMusic	4/5 stars
The Encyclopedia of Popular Music	4/5 stars
The Guardian	4/5 stars
The Penguin Guide to Blues Recordings	3/4 stars
Tucson Citizen	A+

The Guardian wrote: "Blessed with a light, flexible voice that can plumb growling depths when required, Bibb interprets his remit as broadly as possible." The Mirror said that Bibb's "delta blues style is beautifully delicate and detailed, soft curling guitar lines topped off with rich, sweet conversational vocals." The Vancouver Sun noted that Bibb "does some neat finger-picking on 'Delia's Gone', and his 'To Know You' makes good use of mandolin and accordion."

The Sun-Herald stated that "the nimble-fingered Bibb and his supple, skilled band lay on a rootsy buffet that takes in acoustic blues, cruisy R&B, honky tonk and gospel." The Chicago Tribune opined that the album "compares favorably to [Taj] Mahal's and Cray's best." The Gazette listed Painting Signs as the eighth best blues album of 2001.

AllMusic wrote that "Bibb makes a fine case for blues as a music of introspection, warmth, and supreme nuance."

== Track listing ==
No.	Title	Length
1.	"Kokomo"
2.	"Hope in a Hopeless World"
3.	"Five Miles Above"
4.	"I Heard the Angels Singing"
5.	"Delia's Gone"
6.	"Got to Do Better"
7.	"The Light Was Worth the Candle"
8.	"Angel"
9.	"Walkin' Home"
10.	"To Know You"
11.	"Honest I Do"
12.	"Paintin' Signs"
13.	"Don't Ever Let Nobody Drag Your Spirit Down"
