= The Marbles (quartet) =

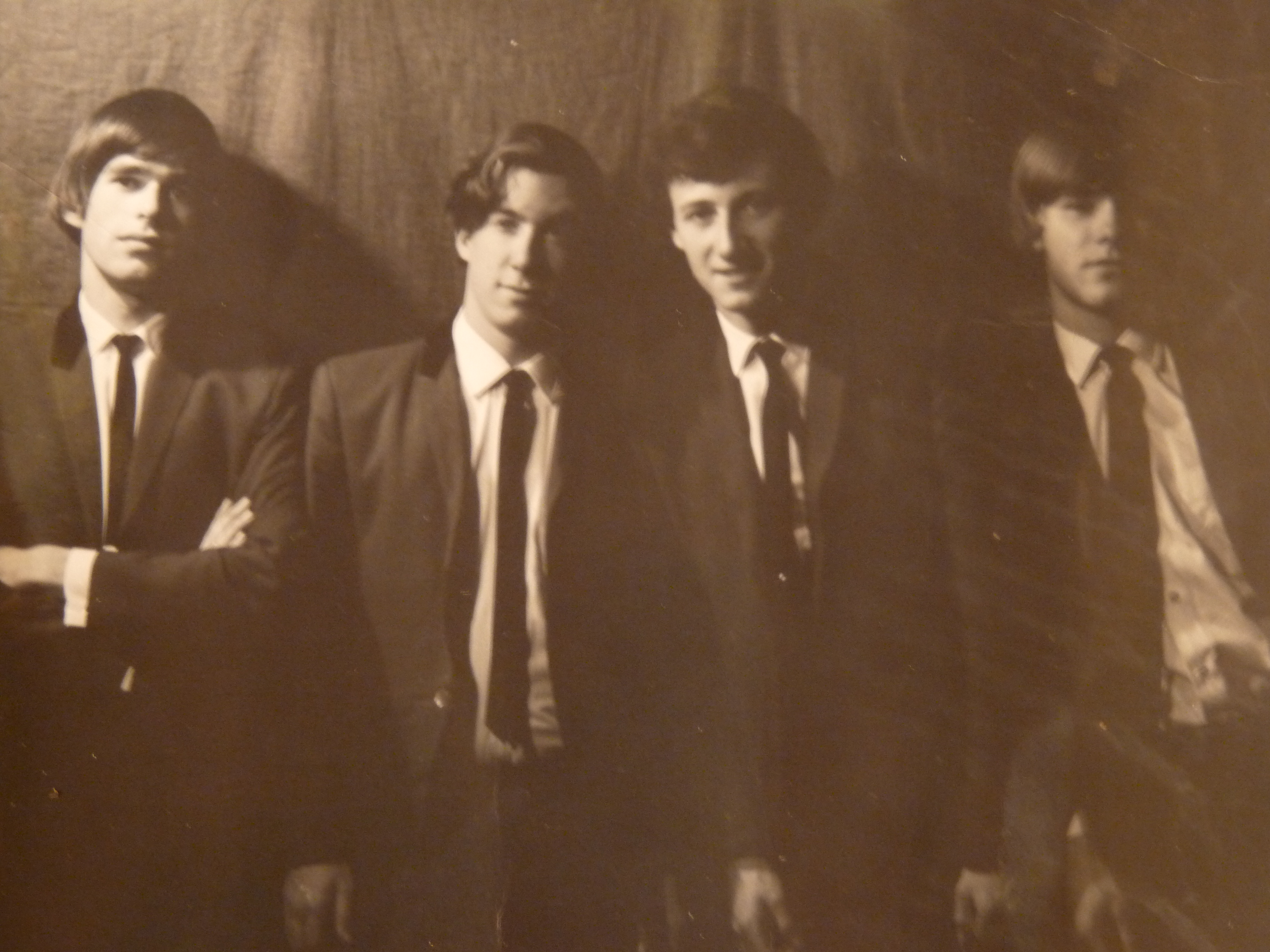
- The Marbles from left to right: Ray Greenleaf on drums, Steve Dowler on rhythm guitar, Peter Shapiro on lead guitar and David Dugdale on bass.

Background information
- Genres: Psychedelic rock
- Years active: 1965-1966

The Marbles were an American rock band active in San Francisco from 1965 to 1966.

== Biography ==
The Marbles had the following members: Peter Shapiro on lead guitar, Steve Dowler on rhythm guitar, David Dugdale on bass and Ray Greenleaf on drums. The Marbles were a psychedelic and rock group whose most notable performances were at the Tribute to Dr. Strange at the Longshoremen's Hall in San Francisco on October 15, 1965, and again at the same venue for The Trips Festival on January 21, 22 and 23 along with Jefferson Airplane, The Charlatans and The Great Society. Both Shapiro and Dowler went on to become members of Paul Fauerso's The Loading Zone.
