= Kitka =

Women's vocal ensemble

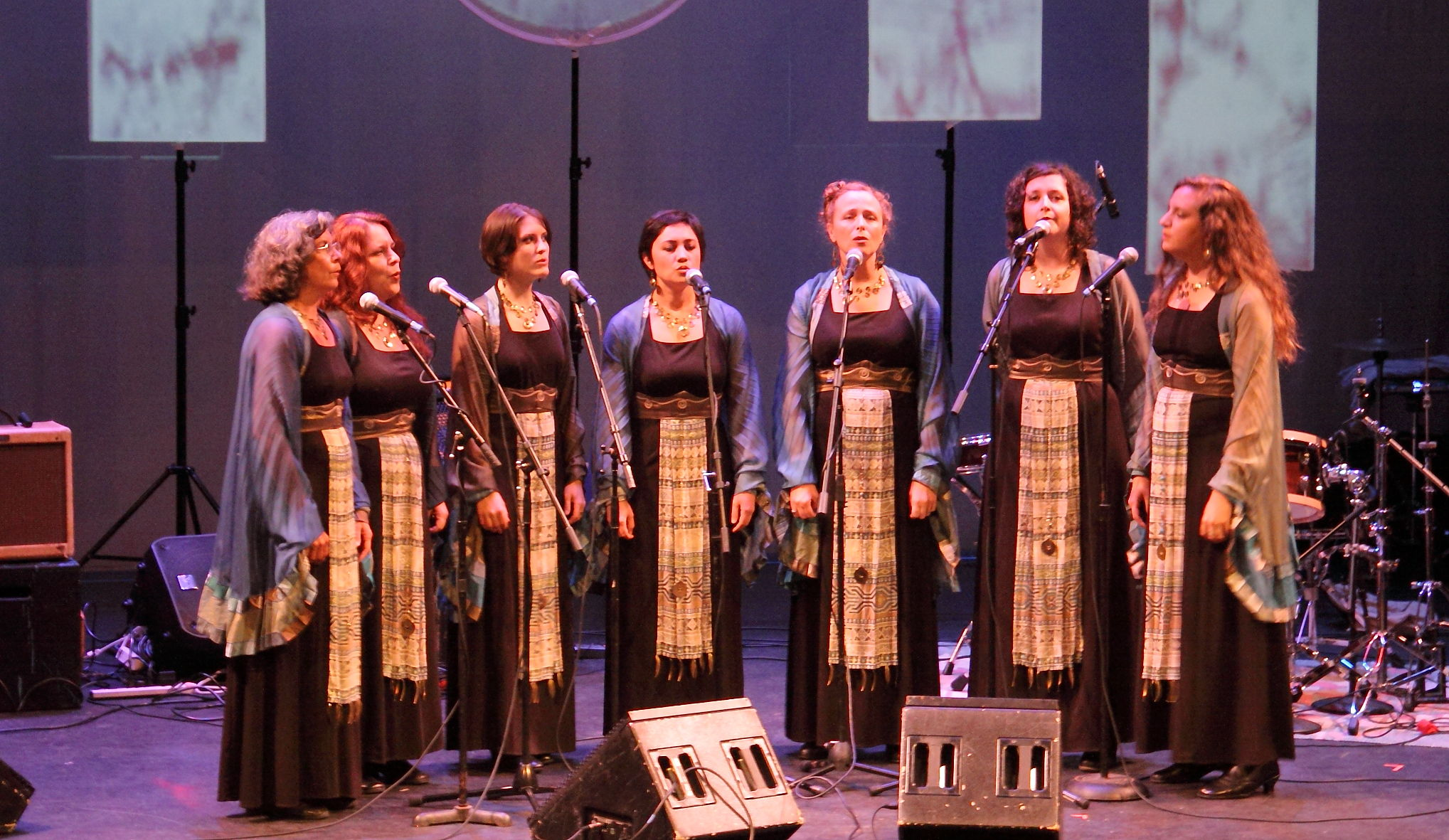
Kitka singing at the Brava Theater, San Francisco, in 2012

Kitka Women's Vocal Ensemble is an all-female professional vocal ensemble based in Oakland, California and focused on Eastern European women’s vocal traditions. It was founded in 1979 as an offshoot of the Westwind International Folk Ensemble. Under the direction of Bon Singer from 1981 to 1996, Kitka became a professional ensemble specializing in the techniques of traditional and contemporary Balkan, Slavic, and Caucasian vocal styling. Under the co-direction of Shira Cion, Janet Kutulas and Juliana Graffagna since 1997, Kitka has been recognized by the National Endowment for the Arts, Chorus America, and the American Choral Directors Association. The group takes its name from the word for "bouquet" in Bulgarian and Macedonian.

== Discography ==
| Album name | Year |
|---|---|
| Kolo | 2025 |
| Evening Star | 2018 |
| Cradle Songs | 2009 |
| The Rusalka Cycle: Songs Between the Worlds | 2006 |
| Wintersongs | 2003 |
| The Vine | 2002 |
| Nectar | 1999 |
| Sacred Voices, Sacred Sounds | 1995 |
| Voices on the Eastern Wind | 1992 |
| Kitka | 1989 |

== External sources ==
- Official website
- Kitka discography at Discogs
