= ZaSu Pitts Memorial Orchestra =

The ZaSu Pitts Memorial Orchestra was formed in San Francisco by Stephen Ashman, a bass-player. They released several LPs in the 1984-1987 time period and continue to be active. The Orchestra did not have any overt connection to ZaSu Pitts beyond the name.

The first version of the band consisted of approximately 15 members (mostly male instrumentalists and female singer-dancers) who performed full band renditions of Motown, soul, R&B and other classic pop songs along with a few original compositions. A mid-1980s New Year's Eve show broadcast by San Francisco PBS station KQED-TV is sometimes shown on public TV in the United States.

The Zasu Pitts Memorial Orchestra won a Bammy Award for Best Independent Album of 1985

On June 23, 2008, the semi-original Zasu Pitts Memorial Orchestra lineup reformed for the first time in nearly 23 years for a one- off concert at the Great American Music Hall in San Francisco to benefit original Zasu Pitts/Big Bang Beat saxophonist Morey Goldstein who had recently been diagnosed with an inoperable brain tumor. Booker T. of Booker T. & the M.G.'s made a guest appearance at this show. Goldstein died on July 5, 2008.

The second iteration of the band, recorded another album and featured musicians like Karl Perazzo and Dave Mathews (who later joined Santana with whom both currently play), Rob Sudduth, Marvin McFadden (both of whom joined Huey Lewis and the News) and many others. The band later re-united and did energetic and long shows, often with multiple musical guests.
