= Wendy Haas =

American vocalist and keyboardist (born 1949)

- Born: August 9, 1949 (age 77)
- Occupations: Vocalist; Keyboardist
- Spouse: Martin Mull (m. 1982; died 2024)
- Children: 1

Wendy Haas-Mull (born August 9, 1949) is an American vocalist and keyboardist best known for her work with the bands Santana and Azteca.

== Biography ==
Growing up in the San Francisco Bay Area, Wendy Haas began her musical career in her mid-teens, playing bass, keyboards and singing. Haas attended Woodside High School in Woodside, California. She was in a high school band in 1966 called The Freudian Slips, and by 1967 the band was playing at The Fillmore.

She worked with a number of local groups, eventually meeting original Santana drummer Michael Shrieve. Shrieve brought her to the attention of Carlos Santana, and Haas subsequently provided piano tracks for the Santana recording Caravanserai (1972) and vocals on the album Welcome (1973). Shrieve also recommended Haas for the Latin Fusion band Azteca, which released two records on Columbia in the early 1970s and toured in North America with Stevie Wonder. Haas was also a member of the all-female band Fanny. Haas also performed and/or recorded with other artists including Alice Cooper, Boz Scaggs, Melissa Manchester, Kenny Rankin, Kiki Dee, and Spencer Davis.

Haas was married to comedian/actor Martin Mull from 1982 until his death in 2024. The couple has a daughter, Maggie Rose Mull.

Haas participated in the Azteca reunion concert in Los Angeles in 2007, which was recorded and released on CD as From the Ruins (2008) and DVD as La piedra del sol (2008).
