= Pete Escovedo =

Mexican-American jazz musician and percussionist (born 1935)

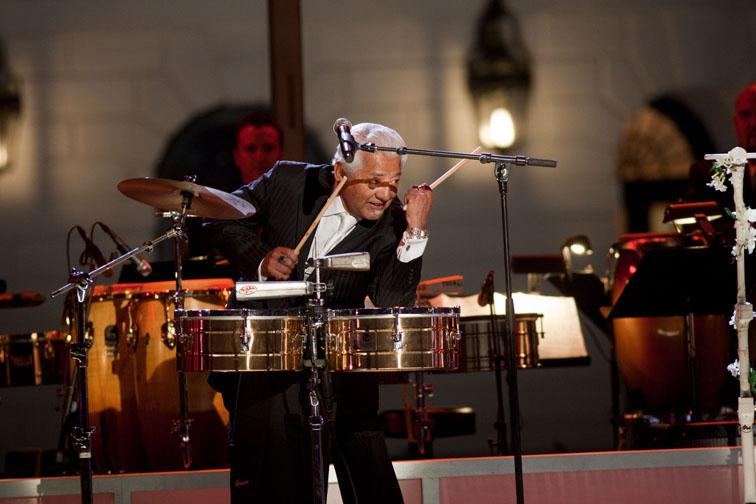
- Escovedo at "In Performance at the White House: Fiesta Latina", October 13, 2009

Background information
- Born: Peter Michael Escovedo; July 13, 1935 (age 91); Pittsburg, California, U.S.
- Genres: Latin jazz
- Occupation: Musician
- Instrument: Percussion

Peter Michael Escovedo Jr. (born July 13, 1935 in Pittsburg, California) is an American percussionist.

== Career ==
With his two brothers, he formed the Escovedo Bros Latin Jazz Sextet, before Carlos Santana hired Pete and Coke Escovedo for his group, Santana. Pete led the 14–24 piece Latin big band Azteca.

He owned a nightclub, Mr. E's, in Berkeley, California in the late 1990s.

== Personal life ==
Escovedo has four children; singer-percussionists Sheila E., Peter Michael Escovedo III, Juan Escovedo, and dancer/choreographer Zina Escovedo.

== Awards ==
Peter "Pete" Escovedo, Jr. and his daughter Sheila were presented with the Latin Grammy Lifetime Achievement Award in 2021.

== Discography ==
- 1972 Azteca (Columbia)
- 1973 Pyramid of the Moon with Azteca (Columbia)
- 1977 Solo Two with Sheila E (Fantasy)
- 1978 Happy Together with Sheila E (Fantasy)
- 1982 Island (EsGo)
- 1985 Yesterday's Memories Tomorrow's Dreams (EsGo)
- 1988 Mister E (Concord Crossover)
- 1995 Flying South (Concord Picante)
- 1997 E Street (Concord Vista)
- 2000 E Music (Concord Picante)
- 2003 Live! (Concord Picante)
- 2013 Live from Stern Grove Festival (Concord Picante)
- 2018 Back to the Bay (Esco)

== See also ==
- List of Austin City Limits performers
