= Azteca (band) =

American latin rock band

- Origin: San Francisco
- Genre: Latin rock
- Years active: 1972–1976; 2007
- Label: Columbia/CBS

Azteca was a Latin rock band formed in 1972 by Coke Escovedo and his brother Pete Escovedo, who had just finished stints with Latin rock pioneering band Santana. Azteca was the first large-scale attempt to combine multiple musical elements in the context of a Latin orchestra setting, and featured horns, woodwinds, multiple keyboards, three vocalists, guitars, drums, and multiple Latin percussionists.

== History ==
On stage, the band consisted of between 15 and 25 members, and toured with acts including Stevie Wonder. Other notable Azteca alumni included vocalists Wendy Haas and Errol Knowles, guitarist Neal Schon, trumpeters Tom Harrell and Eddie Henderson, bassist Paul Jackson, drummers Lenny White and John H. Brinck Jr., and percussionist Victor Pantoja. The group was also a musical starting point for Latin percussionist Sheila E. (the daughter of Pete Escovedo), who appeared with the band as a teenager. Two albums were released on Columbia Records, the self-titled Azteca (1972) and Pyramid of the Moon (1973), before the band split up.

On September 15, 2007, a number of the surviving members of Azteca performed together for the first time in more than thirty years in Hollywood, California. The concert was recorded for an eventual DVD release.

== Discography ==
=== Studio albums ===
- Azteca (1972) U.S. #151
- Pyramid of the Moon (1973)

=== Live albums ===
- From the Ruins (2008)
- La Piedra Del Sol DVD (2008)
