= Tourmaline (activist) =

American artist and activist (born 1983)

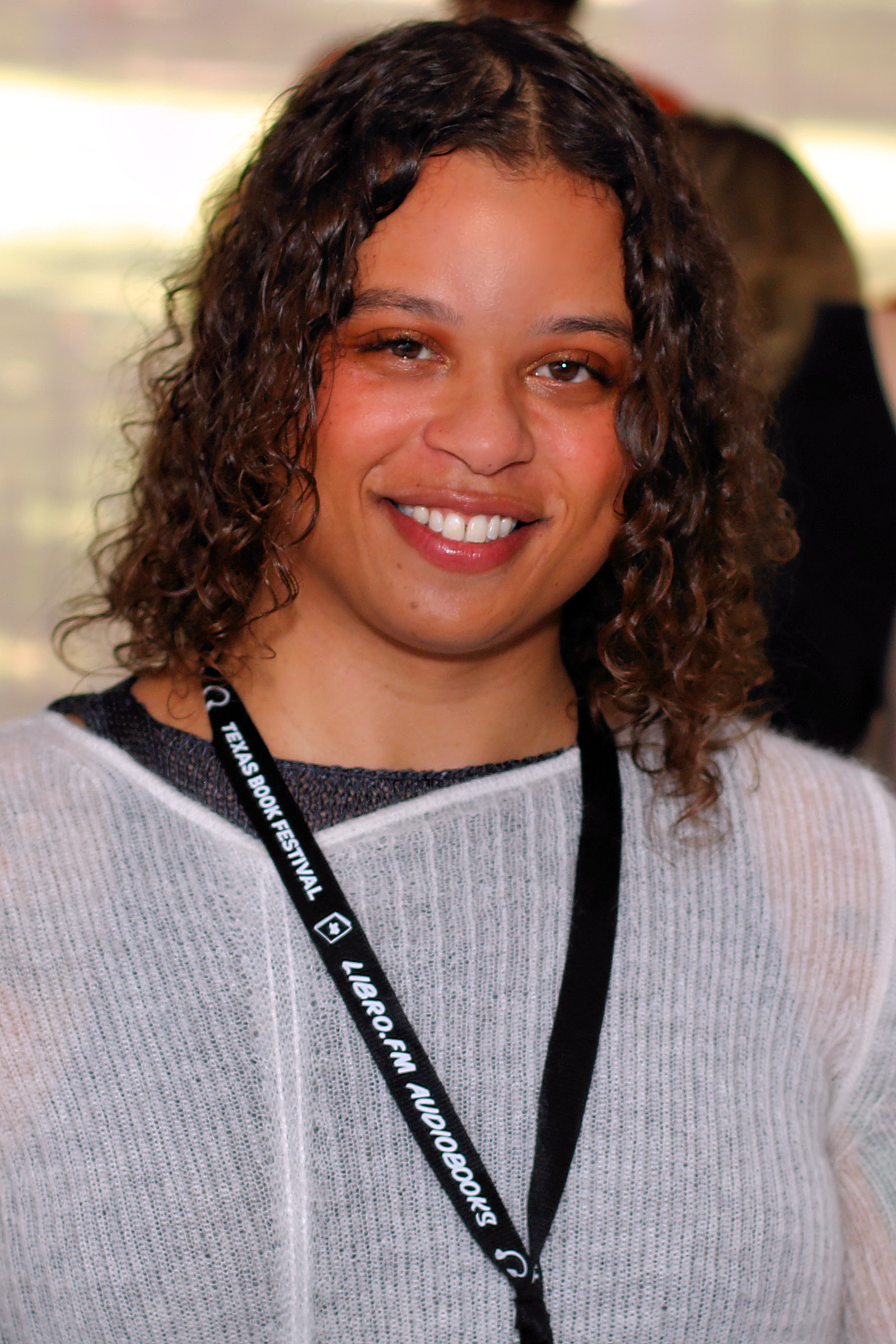
- Tourmaline at the 2025 Texas Book Festival
- Born: July 20, 1983 (age 43); Massachusetts, U.S.
- Other name: Reina Gossett (formerly)
- Education: Columbia University (BA)
- Occupation: Activist • filmmaker • writer • artist • photographer
- Years active: 2010-present
- Relatives: Che Gossett (sibling)

Tourmaline (born 1983; formerly known as Reina Gossett) is an American artist, filmmaker, activist, editor, and writer. She is a transgender woman who identifies as queer. Tourmaline is most notable for her work in transgender activism and economic justice, through her work with the Sylvia Rivera Law Project, Critical Resistance and Queers for Economic Justice. She is based in New York City.

== Early life ==
Tourmaline was born on July 20, 1983, and grew up in a feminist household in Massachusetts. Her mother is a union organizer and her father is a self-defense instructor and anti-imprisonment advocate. Her sibling Che Gossett is involved in AIDS activism and anti HIV criminalization work.

Tourmaline and Che went to a bilingual elementary school in Roxbury where "the teachers were abusive," and later attended suburban schools where they "went from living in poverty to going to school with wealthy people like Mitt Romney's kids."

== Education ==
Tourmaline moved to New York City to attend Columbia University in 2002, and received a Bachelor of Arts in Comparative Ethnic Studies.

Through a school program called Island Academy, she taught creative writing classes at Rikers Island correctional institution.

== Activism ==
Tourmaline has worked at various organizations dealing with transgender activism, economic justice, and prison abolition. She served as the Membership Coordinator for Queers for Economic Justice. At the Sylvia Rivera Law Project, she served as the Director of Membership. She has been a featured speaker about transgender issues at GLAAD.

Along with Critical Resistance, Tourmaline organized a campaign with low income LGBTGNC that prevented the NYC Department of Corrections from building a $375 million jail in the Bronx. Tourmaline has done prison abolition work through a video series titled No One is Disposable: Everyday Practices of Prison Abolition, with Dean Spade.

Tourmaline has also performed work as a community historian for drag queens and transgender individuals around the Stonewall Inn rebellion, observing how archives and repositories rarely prioritize saving transgender artist materials. Instead, Tourmaline has stated that these materials are typically "accidentally archived." Tourmaline has combated this with contemporary trans focused projects, including Tumblr blogs, such as The Spirit Was..., and podcasts.

Tourmaline was featured in Brave Spaces: Perspectives on Faith and LGBT Justice (2015), which was produced by Marc Smolowitz and screened as a Human Rights Campaign event.

In 2017, she edited the book Trap Door: Trans Cultural Production and the Politics of Visibility, with co-editors Eric A. Stanley and Johanna Burton. The book is part of a series called Critical Anthologies in Art and Culture by MIT Press.

In 2013, Tourmaline was awarded the BCRW Activist Fellowship for her work at the intersections of trans justice and prison abolition, and to support her work to document and elevate the histories and legacies of trans women of color. She also served as the 2016–2018 Activist-in-Residence at Barnard Center for Research on Women.

On May 20, 2025, Tourmaline's book, Marsha: The Joy and Defiance of Marsha P. Johnson, the first comprehensive biography of the black trans pioneer, was released.

== Film ==
Tourmaline began her film career in 2010 when she worked on Kagendo Murungi's Taking Freedom Home. For this film she gathered oral histories frorm LGBTQ New Yorkers on the challenges faced accessing affordable housing, medical care, and social services. In 2016 she directed her first film The personal Things which features trans elder Miss Major Griffin-Gracy, who reflects on her life as an activist. In 2017 Tourmaline was awarded a Queer Art Prize for her work on this film. Tourmaline also worked on the Golden Globe nominated film Mudbound as an assistant director to Dee Rees.

Tourmaline has made numerous films about trans activism. STAR People Are Beautiful People (2009), co-produced with Sasha Wortzel, documents the life and work of Sylvia Rivera and STAR (Street Transvestite Action Revolutionaries). Her next work, also co-produced with Wortzel, Happy Birthday, Marsha!, explores the life of activist Marsha P. Johnson. Trans women played every major roles in the film, and queer and trans activists volunteered at the event.

In October 2017, Tourmaline alleged that filmmaker David France plagiarized her grant submission to the Arcus Foundation to create the documentary The Death and Life of Marsha P. Johnson, which debuted on Netflix on October 6. Tourmaline and collaborator Sasha Wortzel were applying for a grant for financial assistance to release their short film, Happy Birthday, Marsha!. This claim was supported by transgender activist Janet Mock. France denied the allegation. Independent investigations launched by both Jezebel and The Advocate concluded that there was mixed evidence, with some claims supported and some not supported. The Jezebel investigation further discussed claims of activist Mariah Lopez, who said to the outlet that "they're both wrong," alleging separate wrongdoing by both Tourmaline and France. A separate investigation by Janet Mock in Allure defended Tourmaline's claims. An article published in the Michigan State University Press journal QED: A Journal in GLBTQ Worldmaking evaluated the available sources at the time, ultimately supporting separate claims by both Lopez and Tourmaline. The debate has brought up questions of artistic integrity, who owns archival footage, and what constitutes a valid accusation.

Also in 2017, Tourmaline's work was featured at the New Museum in New York in an exhibition titled Trigger: Gender as a Tool and a Weapon.

In 2020, the Museum of Modern Art acquired her 2019 film Salacia, about Mary Jones, for its permanent collection.

== Visual Art Projects ==
Tourmaline works in various different mediums in her artwork. In 2020, she created her self-portrait, Summer Azure, which went on display at the Getty Museum in 2021. In Summer Azure, Tourmaline herself is the subject and she's seen up in the blue sky, wearing white clothing in solidarity with Black trans lives. Tiana Reid of 4Columns gives a vivid description of this portrait: "She is holding a helmet on her head, ready for movement. But it’s unclear if her bare feet are perching or springing, if she’s going up or down." Summer Azure comes from a body of five photographs by Tourmaline, all of which are self-portraits and all of which are named after a different kind of butterfly. The photographs were displayed at Tourmaline's first solo show, Pleasure Gardens, at Chapter NY from December 2020 to January 2021. In all of the photos, Summer Azure, Coral Hairstreak, Sleepy Orange Sulphur, Swallowtail, and Morning Cloak, Tourmaline looks directly at the camera. In 2021, The Metropolitan Museum of Art acquired two works by the artist, including Summer Azure, for display in Before Yesterday We Could Fly: An Afrofuturist Period Room.

In summer of 2020, Tourmaline was one of five artists asked to imagine a different kind of monument, one that embodies the current moment of reckoning alongside the crimes of the past, in light of the debate surrounding the removal of confederate monuments and memorials in the United States. To replace The Rikers Island Prison Complex in New York City, Tourmaline drew from two historic New York sites. One site being Nanny Goat Hill, an outcrop of Seneca Village, the autonomous community where Black and Irish people lived and stayed together between 1825 and 1827. The second being Black-owned Pleasure Gardens, havens on the periphery of Lower Manhattan where the Black community went to enjoy fresh air, alcohol, and music in the 1820s given that white-owned pleasure gardens excluded Black patrons. Nanny Goat Hill Pleasure Gardens is a counter-monument that celebrates and amplifies the historic existence of Black space beyond ownership or sovereignty. While this project hasn't come to fruition, Tourmaline wanted to be a part of creating a blueprint for possibility.

== Honors ==
- 2017 Queer Art Prize Finalist
- 2019 Stonewall Community Foundation Honoree
- Soros Justice Fellowship
- Happy Birthday, Marsha! was recognized by filmmaker Ira Sachs and awarded a fellowship with Sach's Queer/Art/Mentorship program for 2012–2013.
- 2020 Time 100
- 2021 Guggenheim Fellowship

== See also ==
- List of transgender film and television directors
