= Victoria Cruz =

American LGBTQ rights activist (1946–2026)

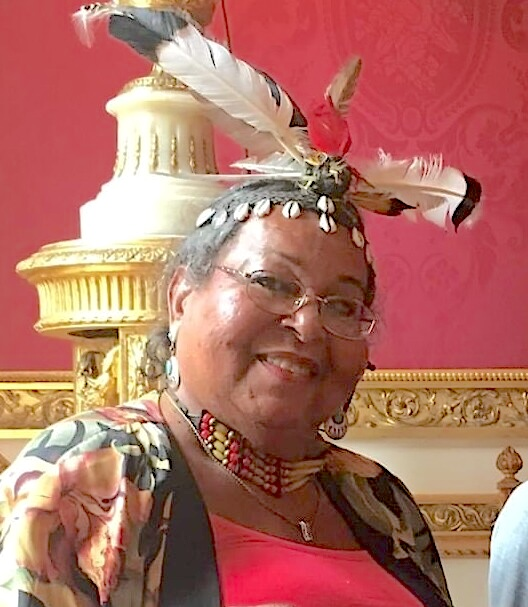
- Victoria Cruz in 2019
- Born: September 19, 1946; Guánica, Puerto Rico
- Died: June 25, 2026 (aged 79); Manhattan, New York, U.S.
- Education: Brooklyn College
- Known for: LGBT rights activism

Victoria Cruz (September 19, 1946 – June 25, 2026) was an American LGBTQ rights and anti-violence activist, and a domestic violence counselor. A contemporary of activists Marsha P. Johnson and Sylvia Rivera, she was featured in the 2017 documentary The Death and Life of Marsha P. Johnson.

== Early life and education ==
Cruz was born in Guánica, Puerto Rico. At the age of four, she moved with her family, which grew to 11 children, to Red Hook, Brooklyn. Cruz came out as transgender at a young age, later stating, "I was born different and I always acted as a female." Her family was supportive of her gender identity.

Cruz graduated from high school with a cosmetology license, and in 1978 enrolled at Brooklyn College, where she majored in theater. After finding a doctor to assist in her gender transition, Cruz performed as a stripper and dancer at clubs in the West Village. She spent time at the Stonewall Inn, where she was dating one of the club's doormen, and was present at the start of the Stonewall riots.

== Career and activism ==
Unable to find work in theater after graduating from Brooklyn College in 1982, Cruz found work as a hairdresser, a drag show performer, and a sex worker. She struggled financially, and became addicted to crack cocaine.

Cruz then began working at the Cobble Hill Nursing Home in Brooklyn. In 1996, four female co-workers groped and sexually harassed her. With the help of the Anti-Violence Project, she reported the assault. Two of the four women were found guilty of harassment; the others were acquitted. Cruz then began working with the Anti-Violence Project in 1997. She dedicated her life to helping victims of domestic violence, police violence and rape in the LGBTQ community.

In 2017, Cruz was featured in the David France documentary The Death and Life of Marsha P. Johnson. In the film, Cruz conducts an investigation into how Johnson, whose 1992 death was initially ruled a suicide, really died. She referred to Johnson as the "Rosa Parks of our community". The documentary premiered at the 2017 Tribeca Film Festival, and was subsequently acquired by Netflix for worldwide distribution, with a release date of October 6. Cruz also appeared in the 2021 documentary Pieces of Us, where she discussed her healing work at the Anti-Violence Project.

== Death ==
Cruz died of liver cancer in Manhattan, on June 25, 2026, at the age of 79.

== Honors and recognition ==
- 2012 – National Crime Victim Service Award (awarded by Attorney General Eric Holder)
