= Marsha P. Johnson =

American LGBTQ activist, sex worker and performer (1945–1992)

- Johnson in 1990
- Born: August 24, 1945; Elizabeth, New Jersey, U.S.
- Body discovered: July 6, 1992 (aged 46); New York City, U.S.
- Known for: Stonewall riots Street Transvestite Action Revolutionaries (STAR); Performance work with the Angels of Light and the Hot Peaches; HIV/AIDS activism
- Movement: LGBTQ movements Gay liberation movement Transgender rights movement

Marsha P. Johnson (August 24, 1945 – July 3, 1992) was an American LGBTQ activist, sex worker and performer. Sometimes known as the "Saint of Christopher Street", she (Note: This article used she/her pronouns for Johnson, as these are the pronouns used by the majority of sources, and, according to Chan and Holder, the pronouns she used most often. This is not meant as a definitive statement on Johnson's identity or the pronouns that she may have preferred. Throughout her life, Johnson at various times identified as a boy, a gay man, a drag queen, a queen, and a "transvestite", in her own words. Some sources, such as Ellison & Hoffman and Teppo, identify Johnson as a trans woman. Holder and Tourmaline speculate that she may have identified with the term gender fluid if it had been commonly used during her lifetime. Tourmaline ultimately considers it a "fool's errand" to try to determine "whether an individual in 1969 was a gay man, versus a drag queen, versus a transvestite, versus a trans woman". According to Cohen, Johnson, when asked whether she saw herself as a man or woman, said, "I think of myself as me". Some members of Johnson's family use he/him pronouns for Johnson. According to her brother, this is "not meant to disrespect her; it is simply how he remembers her".) is considered an important figure in the LGBTQ and transgender rights movements (Note: In line with anthropologist David Valentine's definition of "transgender" as a "useful shorthand in describing non-normative genders; as a way of recognizing and objectifying a group of diverse people who have not always been seen to inhabit the category", this article uses the term broadly to encompass multiple non-normative genders and forms of gender presentation.) due to her involvement in the Stonewall riots, her work with Street Transvestite Action Revolutionaries (STAR), and her advocacy for people with AIDS.

Born in Elizabeth, New Jersey, Johnson wore women's clothing for the first time when she was five years old. After graduating from high school, she moved to Manhattan, where she regularly spent time on 42nd Street in Times Square, working at the local Childs Restaurants and supplementing her income through begging and sex work. Often going out in partial drag, she became well known for her vibrant accessories. She participated in the Stonewall riots in 1969, though her exact role is debated, and afterward, she was active in the Gay Activists Alliance (GAA) and Gay Liberation Front (GLF). In 1970, she participated in the Weinstein Hall occupation and helped found STAR, which provided food and shelter for transgender youth through STAR House, a four-bedroom rental home in the East Village.

After STAR's dissolution in 1973, Johnson began performing with various theatrical troupes around Manhattan, including the Angels of Light and the Hot Peaches. After the beginning of the AIDS pandemic in New York in 1980, she cared for her friends who were dying of AIDS and engaged in AIDS-related activism. She disappeared under mysterious circumstances in 1992, with her body being found floating in the Hudson River on July 6. While police initially ruled her death a suicide, many speculate that she was either murdered, chased into the water, or fell in accidentally. She was 46.

After her death, Johnson became the subject of many tributes and memorials throughout the United States. She is the subject of several films, including the documentaries Pay It No Mind and The Death and Life of Marsha P. Johnson, as well as the short film Happy Birthday, Marsha! Because of her struggles with mental health, as well as her regular interaction with the medical and penal systems, some researchers analyze her life and contributions to the LGBTQ movement through the perspective of mad and disability studies.

== Early life ==
Marsha P. Johnson was born Malcolm Michaels Jr. (Note: While Wikipedia policy specifies that the dead/former names of transgender people should not be featured on the encyclopedia, Johnson continued to use her birth name throughout her life under certain circumstances. Some sources, such as Cohen, consider Malcolm to have been a "male persona" of Johnson's. Others, such as Mary Lou Harris, whom Johnson occasionally babysat, consider Malcolm to have been "Marsha's protector, a different character Marsha conjured up to keep herself safe". Some members of Johnson's family also use the names "Malcolm" and "Mikey" for Johnson. Per Tourmaline, paraphrasing Johnson's brother, "Marsha never asked him to call her by her chosen name and if she did, he would have".) on August 24, 1945, in Elizabeth, New Jersey. Her mother, Alberta Claiborne, was a housekeeper from Elizabeth. Her father, Malcolm Michaels Sr, was a General Motors (GM) assembly line worker who relocated to neighboring Linden, New Jersey, from Virginia during the Second Great Migration. The two separated when Johnson was three years old, with her father returning to Linden to work at the GM plant there. While Johnson lived with her mother in Elizabeth, her father continued to have an active presence in her life. Elizabeth was both a segregated city and an early hub for civil rights activism when Johnson was young, with activists launching a campaign there to protest discrimination at the local Howard Johnson's hotel. She lived in a small house on Washington Avenue in central Elizabeth.

Johnson wore women's clothing for the first time at five years old, against her mother's wishes (Note: Johnson had a complicated relationship with her mother, who struggled to understand aspects of Johnson's LGBTQ identity at times but was generally supportive of her. In one instance, after Marsha's first arrest, she helped her find legal representation, and she also regularly visited Marsha when she was institutionalized. In an interview, Johnson requested that "if anyone should ever write [her] life story" that she would like to "thank all those wonderful people on my way up the hill from Elizabeth, New Jersey... especially [her] mom and [her] dad and sisters and brothers".) and despite hostility from local children. However, after being raped by a 13-year-old boy, she temporarily stopped. (Note: Johnson later claimed that she was sexually inactive until the age of 17. According to her biographer, Tourmaline, she was sexually active as a teenager.) She frequently saw film screenings at the local Little Theater, where she was inspired by actress Billie Burke. She also attended the Mount Teman African Methodist Episcopal (AME) Church, the oldest Black church in Elizabeth. Johnson was deeply religious, attending church every Sunday and performing onstage as part of the church's Christmas program. Her mother sometimes attended drag shows at Billy's Tavern, a local gay bar.

Johnson attended Edison High School (now the Thomas A. Edison Career and Technical Academy) in Elizabeth. She regularly participated in local parades and was the drum major for her school's marching band. In 1962, at the age of 17, she briefly enlisted in the United States Navy. She began receiving military recruit training in Chicago but was honorably discharged after she punched a man who tried to sexually assault her. That same year, she attended her first drag ball in New York City. Soon after, she began waiting tables hoping to raising money to move to Manhattan, finally doing so after graduating from high school.

== Early years in New York ==
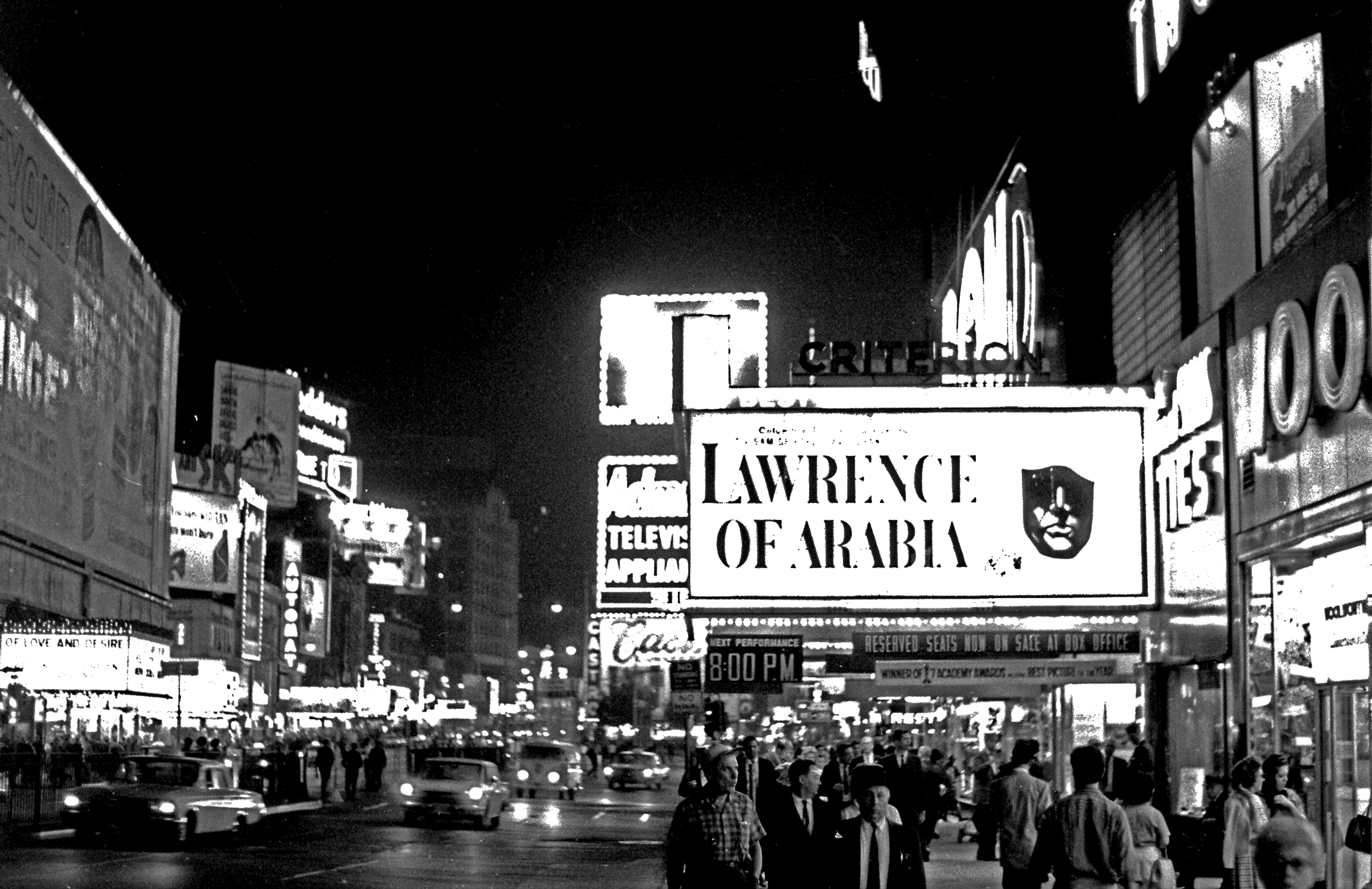
Johnson frequented 42nd Street in Times Square, where she met Sylvia Rivera.

Johnson moved to New York in 1963, allegedly with "$15 and a bag of clothes". She regularly spent time on 42nd Street in Times Square. She began working at the Childs Restaurant there, supplementing her income by begging and through sex work, for which she was frequently arrested. It was in Times Square that she first met Sylvia Rivera, whom she took out to eat at Childs with money she had earned from begging. Activist Randy Wicker later recalled her as "the most generous person [he] ever knew", noting an incident when she stole a loaf of bread to feed an unhoused person. She also met Agosto Machado, with whom she would regularly collaborate on artistic ventures. Lacking stable housing, she regularly slept in friends' apartments, hotels, adult movie theaters, and gay bathhouses.

Johnson frequently went out in partial drag. Initially using the moniker "Black Marsha", she later adopted the name Marsha P. Johnson. According to Tourmaline, the name "Marsha" was a reanalysis derived from a nickname of hers, "Mikey". The name "Johnson" was derived from a local Howard Johnson restaurant in Manhattan. When asked about the meaning of the middle initial "P", Johnson gave various answers. At times, she said that it stood for "pay it no mind", particularly when questioned about her gender. However, she eventually said to Village Voice reporter Steve Watson, a close friend, that it stood for "Piola". Johnson regularly incorporated dresses, high heels, robes, stockings, and wigs into her presentation. While she lacked the financial resources to afford the expensive outfits associated with "high drag", (Note: According to a contemporary study of drag culture written by Esther Newton in 1972, "high drag" at the time would have been characterized by "very formal female attire", often including elaborate wigs, high heels, makeup, and various "formal accessories".) she frequently supplemented her appearance with vibrant improvised accessories such as artificial fruits, Christmas lights, and crowns made from discarded flowers. In a 1970 interview with journalist Liza Cowan, Johnson says that she was wearing women's clothing "full-time" by 1969. At some point, she began undergoing feminizing hormone therapy, saying that "when [she] became a drag queen, [she] started to live [her] life as a woman". In the Cowan interview, she said that her goal was to eventually obtain gender-affirming surgery.

== Stonewall riots ==
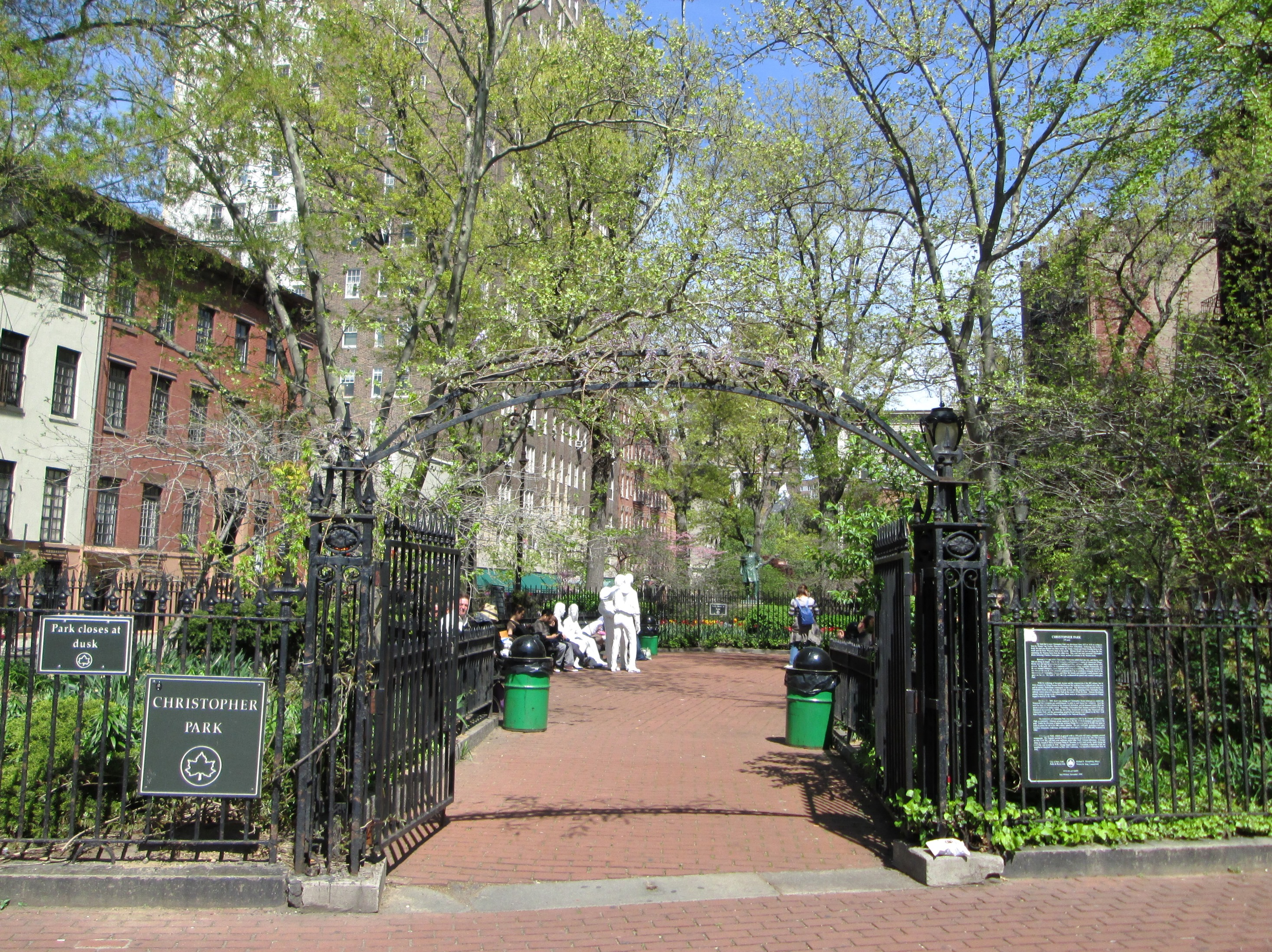
Christopher Park in 2013, now part of the Stonewall National Monument, stands across the street from the Stonewall Inn. George Segal's Gay Liberation statues now stand where Johnson and the other street queens and homeless gay youth spent time in decades past.

Various accounts exist of Johnson's participation in the Stonewall riots. The riots, which took place at the Stonewall Inn in Greenwich Village, were provoked by a police raid and the attempted arrests of several patrons, including cross-dressers and sex workers. Johnson claims to have been one of the first drag queens to frequent the Stonewall, an account corroborated by independent scholars Monica Keller and Jessica Morris. However, Tourmaline notes that Johnson and her associates were frequently denied entry, often opting to spend their time at Sheridan Square across the street instead.

According to historian Martin Duberman, "rumor has it" that Johnson, upset by several "no-shows" at a party she had organized, went to the Stonewall on June 27, 1969, to dance. Johnson remembers it being a birthday party and claimed in a later interview that she remembers the riots as having happened in August, around the time of her birthday. The raids actually began in the early hours of the morning on June 28.

According to writer David Carter, activist Robin Souza reported that after the raids started, fellow Stonewall veterans such as Morty Manford and Marty Robinson witnessed Johnson throw a shot glass at a mirror, screaming, "I got my civil rights!" Members of the Gay Activists Alliance (GAA) later considered this the "shot glass that was heard around the world". Carter notes inconsistencies with this account, observing that in official testimonies given by Manford, he did not mention Johnson. Carter speculates that this may have been an attempt by Manford to censor himself, fearing that crediting Johnson, a mentally ill and transgender person, with the riots would reflect poorly on the gay liberation movement. Carter identifies Johnson as having been "almost indubitably among the first to be violent that night and may possibly even have been the first". Playwright Robert Heide remembers that as the riots were beginning, Johnson shouted at police and threw rocks at them. Johnson herself claims that she did not arrive at the scene of the riots until 2:00 a.m, after they had already started. Historian Marc Stein claims that while she "definitely participated in subsequent developments", it is unlikely that Johnson was present at the beginning of the riots. Mama Jean Devente, a friend of Johnson's, remembers Johnson helping her tend to her wounds after she was beaten by police. Activist Craig Rodwell says that at some point during the second night, Johnson climbed on top of a lamppost and dropped a bag containing a heavy object onto a police car's windshield, destroying it.

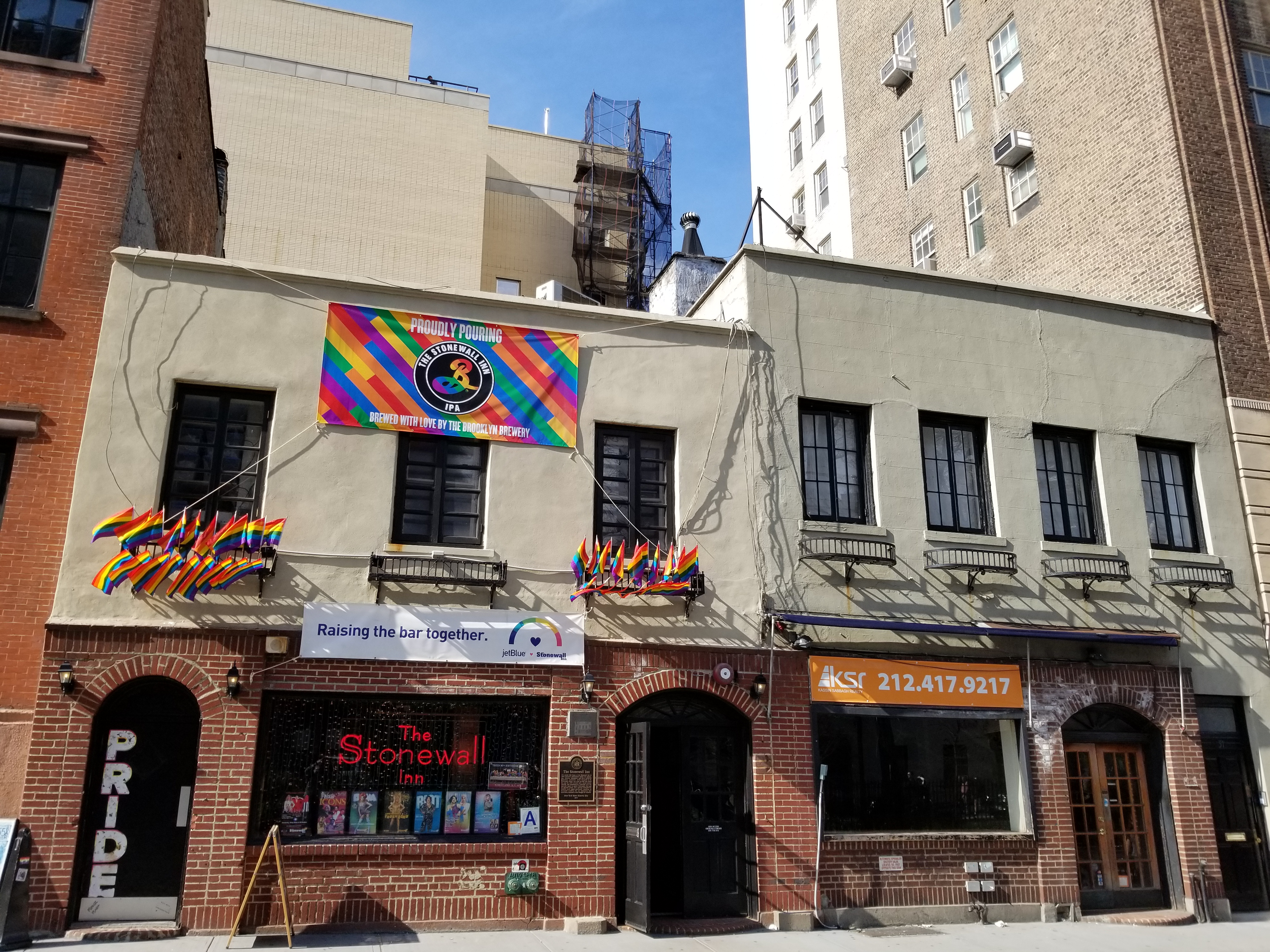
Stonewall Inn, 2016

Stein notes several dimensions to the debates about Johnson's participation at Stonewall. One dimension concerns recognition, with some arguing that proper credit should be accorded to individuals who played an important role in the riots and others arguing that discussions about credit are ahistorical and pertain primarily to modern debates about identity politics rather than the riots themselves. Another dimension concerns the role of structural factors in the riots, with some arguing that the emphasis on individual agency is overstated relative to these "social and structural factors". Amidst these debates, Stein notes that it is "challenging to avoid both minimization and exaggeration".

While researchers Florence Ashley and Sam Sanchinel argue that Johnson was likely not one of the primary instigators of the riots, they say transgender people claim she was present as a way of placing themselves within the broader LGBTQ coalition and of signaling the radical nature of the transgender rights movement. However, they also argue that the mainstream transgender movement uses Johnson's history at Stonewall opportunistically, overlooking her class, race, mental health, and position as a sex worker when convenient.

Tourmaline argues that inconsistencies in Johnson's story "offer another way of remembering—one in which one's emotional memory takes over the facts". She also notes that Johnson periodically became confused and frustrated when asked too many questions about Stonewall, speculating that this may have been the result of trauma and arguing that Johnson's "incoherence" should be respected.

== After Stonewall ==
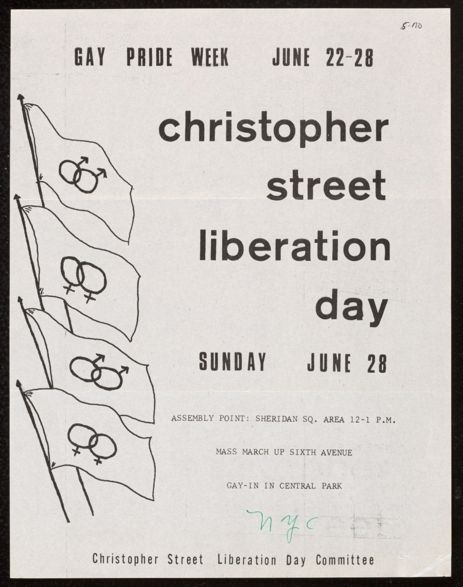
Flyer for the first Christopher Street Liberation Day rally on June 28, 1970. Johnson marched in the rally alongside the Gay Activists Alliance (GAA).

In the aftermath of the Stonewall riots, gay rights activists founded various advocacy organizations, including the GAA and the Gay Liberation Front (GLF). Johnson was active in both organizations. As part of her work with the GAA, she petitioned for a gay and lesbian nondiscrimination bill. In one case, she was arrested while petitioning in Bryant Park during a Vietnam War protest. The GAA widely publicized her arrest and successfully compelled the city to drop the charges against her. Later, on June 28, 1970, the anniversary of the beginning of the Stonewall riots, Johnson marched with the GAA during the first Christopher Street Liberation Day rally.

In September 1970, Johnson participated in the Weinstein Hall occupation to protest the cancellation of gay dances at the Weinstein Hall residential building at New York University (NYU) alongside several other street queens, (Note: A term used to refer to unhoused transgender youths of color.) including Andorra Martin, Bambi L'Amour, and Bubbles Rose Lee. Johnson and the other street queens slept in couches in the back of the basement and were tasked with cooking, cleaning, and fundraising for the occupation. During this time, Johnson suggested the formation of an organization for transgender people, to be called Street Transvestite Action Revolutionaries (STAR). According to Tourmaline, the name may have been partially inspired by an album called STAR by the musician Julianne. After five days, on September 25, the occupation was broken up by a police tactical unit, prompting the occupiers to leave and march throughout Greenwich Village.

A group called Street Transvestites for Gay Power, which included both Johnson and Rivera, later organized protests at NYU's Loeb Student Center and Bellevue Hospital. At NYU, they demanded the creation of a gay community center, open enrollment for gay people, and the right to be openly gay without fear of retaliation. At Bellevue, they demanded an end to psychiatric abuse and compulsory sterilization, as well as free, community-controlled health and dental care. NYU responded by allowing at least one gay dance to take place at Weinstein Hall. Around this time, Johnson and Rivera also managed a shelter for roughly 20 unhoused transgender youths out of a semi-trailer truck. According to Rivera, she and Johnson supported themselves and the shelter by begging and engaging in sex work. They provided meals for the youths who lived at the shelter, assuming a parental role for them. At some point, a group of truck drivers tried to take the trailer away. Johnson and Rivera vigorously protested, fearing that one or more of the youths were still inside. However, their pleas were ignored, and one of the youths was accidentally taken to California.

== STAR activism ==
Location of STAR House in the East Village, Manhattan

The first official STAR meeting, which was prompted by the incident with the truck drivers, was held in late 1970. Attendees included Johnson, Rivera, Martin, Lee, Bebe Scarpi, and Zazu Nova. At the meeting, Rivera nominated Johnson for president of the new organization, but she declined, claiming that she "tend[ed] to go off in other directions". She instead assumed the role of vice president while Rivera became president. The group also made preparations for the creation of a permanent shelter for unhoused youth, to be called STAR House, with either Scarpi or Lee agreeing to secure a rental from the mafia. (Note: Scarpi according to Duberman and Lee according to Cohen. Per Duberman, Lee was friends with a local mafioso named Michael Umbers.)

STAR began renting STAR House, which was located at 213 East 2nd Street, in November 1970. STAR House provided clothing and food for its residents: a rotating group of 15 to 25 individuals. Influenced by ballroom "house" culture, Johnson and Rivera took on the role of "house mothers", engaging in sex work to help pay for the house's rent while the house's "children" obtained food. Johnson also engaged in various types of domestic work to support the residents of STAR House, including sewing banners for STAR to use at events. Someday, she hoped that STAR would be able to provide educational and medical services for its residents.

During this time, Johnson met Thomas Gerald Davis, also known as Candy, at a dance. Davis regularly spent time at STAR House, and the two entered a romantic relationship. At some point, they held a wedding ceremony, though they never formalized their marriage legally. David gifted Johnson a dog to symbolize their relationship, and the dog was pregnant with a litter of puppies who all became residents of STAR House. Tourmaline characterizes Johnson and Davis's relationship as "marked by love, complexity, and a deep desire for self-actualization". However, it was sometimes strained because of Davis's drug addiction and his resistance to Johnson's association with transgender people.

In 1971, while looking for money to buy drugs, Davis tried to rob an off-duty police officer near STAR House, prompting the officer to shoot him in the heart, killing him. Johnson and Rivera attended his funeral together, after which the dog Davis had gifted Johnson died. These events caused Johnson to experience an emotional breakdown, which resulted in her admittance to Wards Island State Hospital. During her stay in the hospital, she allegedly had visions of a spirit named "Oxygen", who encouraged her to remain celibate and instead pursue other forms of celebration and joy. Johnson interpreted this as a call to embrace her identity without pursuing external romantic attachments. STAR participated in a march to the hospital alongside the GAA, where they held a "candle vigil" in Johnson's honor, as well as to protest the treatment of gays in hospitals and prisons.

The residents of STAR House were evicted in July 1971. (Note: Various accounts have been given regarding the end of STAR House. According to Rivera, there was a "confrontation" with Michael Umbers, the mafioso who was renting the house to STAR. However, according to Kohler, no such confrontation occurred.) After its eviction, STAR's headquarters moved throughout Manhattan, including to an apartment rented by Johnson on Eldridge Street and to various hotel rooms on 12th Street. Its focus shifted towards the New York City Gay Rights Bill, which the GAA had introduced in September 1970. The purpose of the bill was to provide protections against sexual orientation discrimination. Johnson supported the bill, stating:

I have no intention of getting a job as long as this country discriminates against homosexuals. There's only homosexuals, bisexuals, and try-sexuals, darling, and there's no straight people!

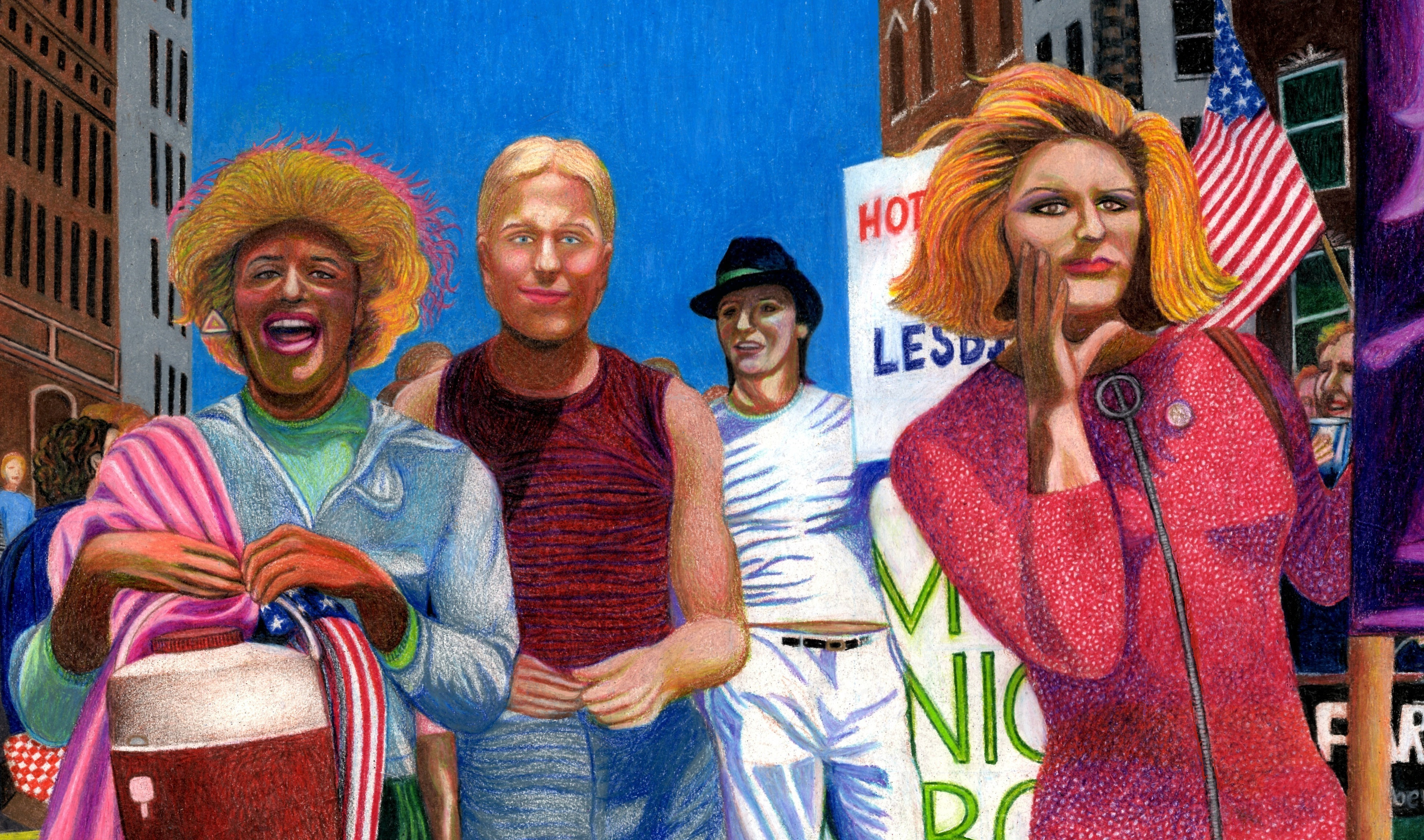
Marsha P. Johnson, Joseph Ratanski and Sylvia Rivera in 1973 by Gary LeGault

Throughout 1972, STAR stopped holding meetings and saw a decline in demonstrations. According to Rivera, the 1973 Christopher Street Liberation Day rally marked the death of STAR. The gay liberation movement had fragmented by that point, with the National LGBTQ Task Force advocating for incremental reforms while many lesbians embraced separatism. STAR was initially slated to march at the front of the parade, but they were ultimately prevented from marching at all. A STAR banner was also removed from the rally's bandstand. Angered, and despite attempts by some gay activists to remove her, Rivera took the stage in tears, criticizing the attendees for excluding transgender people from their activism despite their many contributions to the struggle for LGBTQ rights. After the rally, Johnson sought out Rivera, who had returned to her apartment and slit her wrists in the bathroom. Johnson promptly called an ambulance. Rivera was taken to Bellevue, where she met with Johnson and activist Bob Kohler that evening.

== Performance work ==
After STAR's dissolution, Johnson began starring in theatrical performances as part of the Angels of Light (commonly referred to as "the Angels"), an offshoot from the Cockettes founded by Hibiscus and Rumi Missabu. In 1972, she was cast as a queen in a Lower East Side production of the play The Enchanted Miracle, becoming a crowd favorite. She also began performing with the Hot Peaches, a theatrical troupe founded in 1972 by Jimmy Camicia, who had attended high school with Johnson in Elizabeth. From 1972 to 1973, she performed in four productions by the Hot Peaches, including Sabled Sables, Androgyny in Ostendorf, a revival of The Wonderful Wizard of U.S, and Alice and the Great American Sideshow, and continued to perform with them until 1990.

While members of the Angels pressured Johnson to choose between her work with the Angels and her work with the Hot Peaches, she continued to star in Angels productions such as Gossamer Wings and Camicia's film Dragula. She also starred in a production of the Theatre of the Ridiculous play Caprice, written by Charles Ludlam. In 1975, she played a character named Gypsie Trash in The Divas of Sheridan Square, which was produced by Camicia. That year, she also served as a model for artist Andy Warhol's Ladies and Gentlemen series, for which she was paid US$50 (equivalent to $299 in 2025).

During this time, patrons of the Angels paid for Marsha's living expenses. She experienced many emotional breakdowns. Partway through the run of Alice and the Great American Sideshow, she was arrested after smashing the car window of a group of hecklers. As a result, she was confined to Bellevue and given Thorazine, an anti-psychotic medication that hurt her throat and limited her ability to perform. Kohler says that Johnson was periodically absent for two or three months at a time to receive Thorazine treatment, sometimes prompted by incidents where she was reported walking naked up Christopher Street. Upon returning, the medication would wear off over the course of a month, and she would return to normal.

As of 1979, Johnson was unhoused again, frequently sleeping in gay bathhouses and at friends' houses. Beginning in 1980, Johnson began living with Randy Wicker in Hoboken, New Jersey, who had invited Johnson to stay the night one time when it was "very cold out—about 10 degrees [Fahrenheit]" (−12 °C). Johnson lived with Wicker for the next 12 years. She was also shot in the back by a taxi driver in 1980 while engaging in sex work along the West Side Highway. While medical staff at Saint Vincent's Medical Center attempted to remove the bullet, they were unsuccessful, and it remained lodged in Johnson's back for the rest of her life, causing her discomfort and making it hard for her to sleep. During the early 1980s, she began an intermittent romantic relationship with a man named Joseph Ratanski. She also, with Wicker's assistance, regularly traveled to distant locations like Puerto Rico and Los Angeles, California, where she engaged in sex work during the 1984 Summer Olympics.

== AIDS activism ==
External image
- A Photograph of Marsha P. Johnson and Randy Wicker Holding a Quilt for David Combs, from the Marsha P. Johnson & Sylvia Rivera Collection, hosted by the Digital Transgender Archive.

Several cases of acquired immunodeficiency syndrome (AIDS), originally known as Gay-Related Immune Deficiency (GRID) due to its association with gay men, were noted in New York City in 1980, a year before the disease was officially reported in 1981. By mid-1984, 5,000 Americans were infected with AIDS. At the end of that year, Johnson began regularly spending time with AIDS patients in hospitals, praying for them and lighting candles for them. After being honored in the New York Pride rally in June 1985, she helped to organize the first AIDS Walk in Los Angeles in July. She also participated in AIDS dance-a-thons in New York. When a friend of hers fell terminally ill from AIDS-related complications, she cared for him until his death and held a vigil for him. Throughout this period, she cared for David Combs, Wicker's ex-husband who was infected with AIDS, acting as his "nurse" while Wicker was at work. At some point, the strain of the ongoing pandemic caused Johnson to have a mental breakdown, damaging Wicker's apartment before being temporarily held at St. Mary Hospital. That year, the CDC estimated that between 500,000 and 1 million people were seropositive for AIDS.

In 1987, community activists in New York founded the AIDS Coalition to Unleash Power (ACT UP), which used direct action tactics to advocate for AIDS-related healthcare reforms. Johnson was not an active member of ACT UP but did participate in various ACT UP activities, including marches and at least one meeting. In 1988, she starred as the master of ceremonies in the Hot Peaches musical Heat, a fictionalized account of the formation of the Hot Peaches that discussed the AIDS pandemic. She also starred as the master of ceremonies in the 1990 play Chrysis Heels, working to support the show's star, International Chrysis, while she struggled with cancer. That year, Johnson experienced a personal crisis marked by the AIDS-related deaths of Combs and of Bill Rafford, who had been a performer with the Angels of Light. She herself also tested HIV-positive during this time. This confluence of events caused her to have another mental breakdown, during which she was once again confined at St. Mary's. At the New York Pride rally that year, she and Wicker marched with the People with AIDS Coalition, carrying a banner memorializing Combs.

== Personal life ==
Johnson stated that she was a practicing Catholic who also had ties to Santería.

== Death ==
On July 2, 1992, soon after that year's Pride rally, Johnson left Wicker's apartment. At first, Wicker assumed that she had left for Los Angeles, which she had repeatedly expressed interest in doing after Pride. On July 5, he attempted to file a missing person's report but was turned away by police under the pretext that missing person's reports could only be filed for people under 40 years old. Johnson was 46 at the time. On July 6, Johnson's body was discovered floating in the Hudson River. It was collected by two police boats, which deposited it on the pavement nearby, where it remained for some time before being taken by a city coroner.

Various explanations have been offered for Johnson's death. Police originally ruled the death a suicide. Rivera doubted this explanation, saying that she and Johnson had "made a pact" to "cross the 'River Jordan' together". Journalist Michael Musto similarly denies that Johnson was suicidal at the time of her death. Kohler and activist Jeremiah Newton believe that Johnson may have gone to the river during a mental breakdown and attempted to cross it.

Wicker believes that she may have fallen into the river or been pushed in. According to Wicker, a witness saw four men harassing Johnson on July 4. That witness later saw one of these men fighting with Johnson on a pier. During the fight, he called Johnson a homophobic slur, and he later bragged to someone at a bar that he had killed a drag queen named Marsha. The witness said that when he tried to tell police what he had seen, his story was ignored. Activist Victoria Cruz reportedly heard from witnesses that Johnson was being chased on the night of July 4. New York City Council member Tom Duane suggests Marsha might have jumped into the river to escape harassment, a tactic she had used before. Tourmaline speculates that Marsha may have been experiencing a breakdown and was therefore disoriented.

Johnson's body was discovered with a bruise on the back of her head, leading many to suspect she had been attacked. However, in the 2017 documentary The Death and Life of Marsha P. Johnson, an independent medical examiner reviewed the coroner's report, clarifying that damage to Marsha's body, including missing eyes and a hole in her head, could have occurred after death as police removed her from the river. The examiner also said that Johnson likely "went into the water while still alive and breathing" and that there was "no evidence of violent assault".

Johnson's death occurred during a time when anti-gay violence was at a peak in New York City, including hate crime by police. Johnson was one of several activists who had been drawing attention to the issue, participating in marches and other activities to demand justice for victims and an inquiry into the violence. She was a vocal opponent of the "dirty cops" and organized crime elements that many believed were responsible for these assaults and murders. At one point, she expressed concern that her and Wicker's involvement in these activities "could get you murdered".

Mariah Lopez, Johnson's niece and Sylvia Rivera's daughter, successfully campaigned to have the New York City Police Department (NYPD) re-open Johnson's case in 2012. As a result, the NYPD changed the official cause of death from suicide to "undetermined".

=== Funeral ===
Three separate funerals were held for Johnson, one organized by Wicker in Hoboken, another organized by her family in Elizabeth, and another at the Church of the Village in New York City. The latter service was attended by a representative of Mayor David Dinkins, who read a statement stating that "when it rains on the day of a funeral it is a testimony to the life that person has lived", referencing the weather on the day of the funeral. Other attendees included Rivera, Wicker, Agosto Machado, Bob Kohler, Jeremiah Newton, Marsha's sisters Norma and Jeannie, her brother Bob, and activist Leslie Feinberg. After the service concluded, attendees marched to the Christopher Street Pier, where they held a memorial at the place where Johnson's body was discovered, leaving candles and flowers in the water.

== Legacy ==
=== Tributes ===
When I die, I hope nobody cries, darling... I hope they sing and dance and have a great big party. 'Cause darling I'll just be starting to live my life over again. This old body had just worn out and a new one will just be on its way here!

— Marsha P. Johnson, quoted in Marsha: The Joy and Defiance of Marsha P. Johnson by Tourmaline

Various tributes to Johnson have been produced, some while she was alive and some posthumously. A character named Boom Boom, based on Johnson, is featured in the Hot Peaches play 1982 Street Theater, a comedy based on the Stonewall Riots. In 1996, musician Anohni produced a play titled The Birth of Anne Frank/The Ascension of Marsha P. Johnson. Attendees included prominent drag performers and Stonewall veterans. In 2019, Time created 89 new covers to celebrate women of the year starting from 1920. It chose Johnson for 1969. On June 30, 2020, Google celebrated Marsha P. Johnson with a Google Doodle.

On August 24, 2020, the 75th anniversary of Johnson's birth, East River State Park was renamed the Marsha P. Johnson State Park, becoming the first New York state park named after an openly LGBTQ person. In 2022, Governor Kathy Hochul announced that a new ornamental gate would be constructed at the park in Johnson's honor.

=== Memorialization ===
In May 2019, it was announced that Johnson and Sylvia Rivera would be honored with monuments at Greenwich Village, near the site of the Stonewall. This project was delayed for several years due to the New York City Department of Parks and Recreation's lengthy approval process and the COVID-19 pandemic. On August 24, 2021, without authorization, transgender activists installed their own sculpture, A Love Letter to Marsha, in Christopher Park. The statue, which was created by artist Jesse Pallotta, was given a temporary permit to remain in the park until November and was displayed there until August 24, 2022.

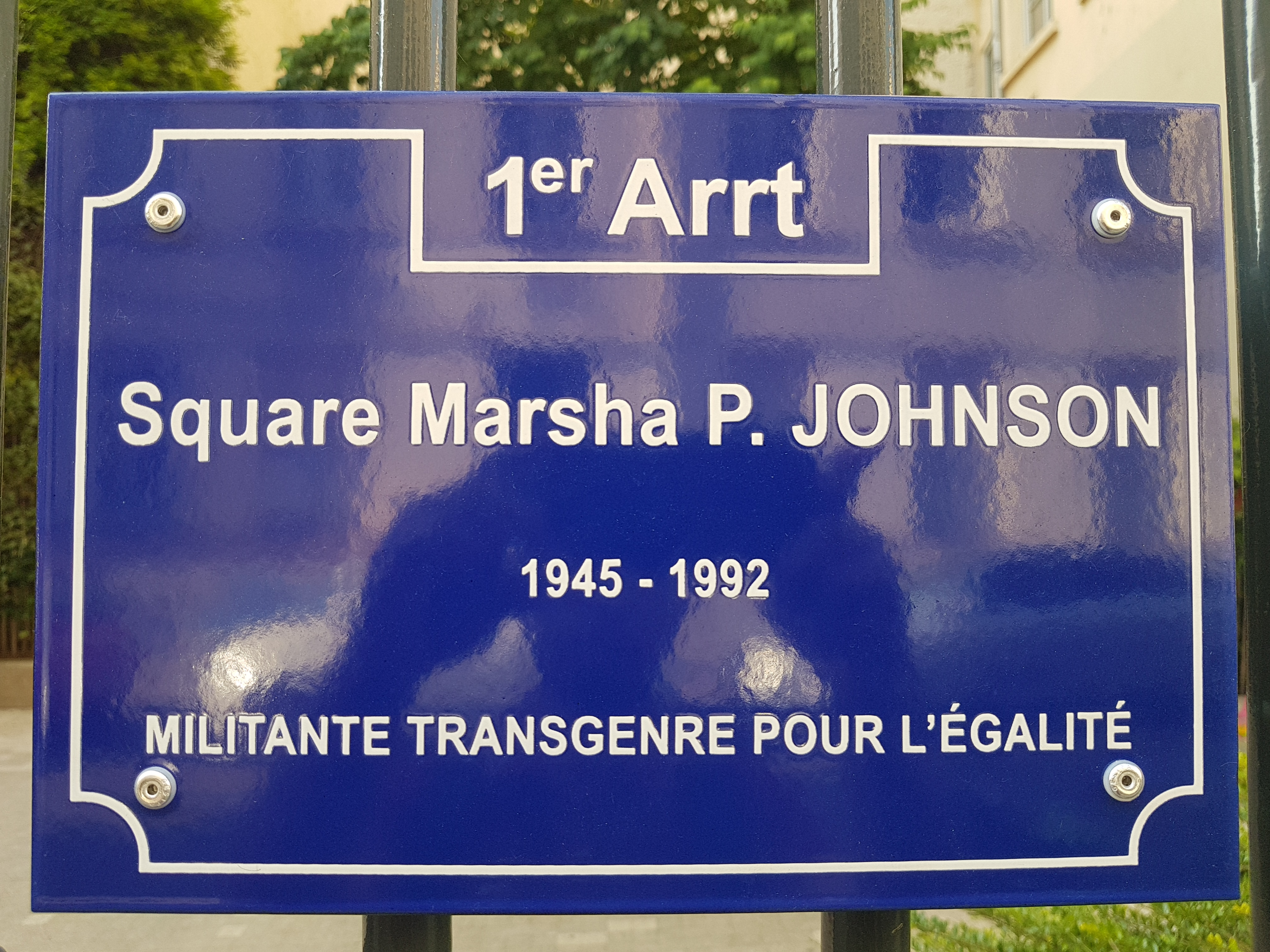
Le square «Marsha P. Johnson» in Lyon

In June 2019, Johnson was one of the inaugural fifty American "pioneers, trailblazers, and heroes" inducted on the National LGBTQ Wall of Honor, which is located at the Stonewall National Monument. A large, painted mural depicting Johnson and Rivera went on display in Dallas, Texas, in August 2019 to commemorate the 50th anniversary of the Stonewall riots. According to journalist Larry Collins, it is the largest mural honoring the transgender community in the United States. In July 2020, a petition to replace a statue of Christopher Columbus in Johnson's hometown, Elizabeth, received 75,000 signatures. In August, the Union County, New Jersey Office of LGBTQ Affairs announced that a monument to Johnson would be erected near Elizabeth city hall. In March 2022 and following proposals to feminize the names of public spaces, a square on Rue Burdeau in Lyon was renamed in honor of Johnson.

=== In popular culture ===
Anohni formed the music ensemble Anohni and the Johnsons, which was named after Johnson, in 2000. A picture of Johnson is featured on the cover of the ensemble's 2023 album, My Back Was a Bridge for You to Cross. A documentary about Johnson's life titled Pay It No Mind, produced by Randy Wicker and directed by Michael Kasino, was released in 2012.

==== The Death and Life of Marsha P. Johnson ====
On October 7, 2017, The Death and Life of Marsha P. Johnson, directed by David France, was released on Netflix. The documentary follows Victoria Cruz as she searches for information about Johnson's death and the death of Islan Nettles, a Black transgender woman who was killed in 2013. The film attracted controversy when Tourmaline accused France of taking ideas and research from a grant application for her then-unreleased film Happy Birthday, Marsha!, starring actress Mya Taylor as Johnson. In an essay published in Teen Vogue, Tourmaline argues that trans women "on the streets" who "fac[e] the kinds of violence Marsha faced" should be the ones to tell Johnson's story and benefit from its telling. In response, France released statements on Twitter and his website denying the accusations, discussing his friendship with Johnson, and calling for people to watch Happy Birthday, Marsha!, which was released in 2018.

Mariah Lopez later released a statement criticizing both Tourmaline and France, stating that Tourmaline had worked to silence Lopez's Strategic Trans Alliance for Radical Reform (STARR) because it competed with the Sylvia Rivera Law Project, where Tourmaline worked. Meanwhile, she accuses France of "predatory, manipulative journalistic tactic[s]" and "jeopardizing her safety and well-being". She cites instances of France's staff stranding her, offering her hard drugs, and recording conversations about transgender murder investigations that STARR was undertaking against her wishes.

==== A Mother of A Revolution! ====
In 2019, American composer Omar Thomas dedicated a wind ensemble piece for Johnson, titled A Mother of A Revolution!. In May 2026, the piece received attention after the Watertown Unified School District board in Watertown, Wisconsin prohibited the performance of the piece by the Watertown High School band. In response, students held a walk-out. The band eventually performed the piece at a concert unaffiliated with the school district, with Omar Thomas as their conductor.

=== Historiography ===
Johnson is often considered foundational to the transgender rights movement and other LGBTQ movements, with many considering her a heroine. Tourmaline states that, because of her role at Stonewall, she "paved the foundation for the modern trans and queer liberation movements". She credits Johnson with inspiring transgender activists and celebrities like Miss Major Griffin-Gracy, Jeanine and Quentin Bell, Raquel Willis, Aariana Rose Philip, Laverne Cox, and Janet Mock, as well as legal reforms and broader cultural change. She is sometimes called the "Saint of Christopher Street".

Scholars have analyzed Johnson's life through the framework of mad and disability studies. According to disability studies scholar Leah Lakshmi Piepzna-Samarasinha, Tourmaline was one of the first writers to discuss Johnson's life using a disability justice framework on her blog, The Spirit Was. Piepzna-Samarasinha argues that Johnson's complex post-traumatic stress disorder, neurodiversity, sadness, and suicidality were both sources of struggle and gifts that allowed them to exhibit radical kindness and openness and to reject respectability politics. Ashley and Sanchinel agree with this assessment and further argue that "trans communities are seeking to narrate Marsha P. Johnson in a context that transcends Stonewall's momentousness by accentuating the radicality of her loving, everyday self". Researcher J. Logan Smilges argues that Johnson's institutionalization and Thorazine treatment show the way that the Diagnostic and Statistical Manual of Mental Disorders medicalized both gender variance and mental illness, an intersection that Smilges calls "neurotrans". They then argue that Johnson's opposition to the medical and penal systems that defined her life was a form of neurotrans politics.

A biography of Johnson by Tourmaline was published in 2025. It was selected as a book club pick by Roxane Gay and received a positive review from Kirkus, which described it as "a warm homage to a pioneering activist".

== See also ==
- Lee Brewster – founder of the Queens Liberation Front
- LGBT culture in New York City
- List of LGBT people from New York City
- NYC Pride March
- Stormé DeLarverie – biracial butch lesbian whose resistance of arrest incited the Stonewall uprising
- Thomas Lanigan-Schmidt – fellow Stonewall veteran, artist, and Union County native
- Paris Is Burning – 1990 film about black drag culture in New York City in the 1980s
- List of unsolved deaths
- Transgender culture of New York City

== Sources ==
- "100 Women of the Year". Time. 2020. Archived from the original on December 23, 2022.
- Town hall of the 1st arrondissement of Lyon (2022). "Féminisation des dénominations des lieux publics" [Feminization of the names of public places] (in French).
- Ashley, Florence; Sanchinel, Sam (2023). "The Saint of Christopher Street: Marsha P. Johnson and the Social Life of a Heroine". Feminist Review. 134 (1): 39–55. doi:10.1177/01417789231166827. ISSN 0141-7789.
- Beemyn, Genny (2021). "History". In Goldberg, Abbie E.; Beemyn, Genny (eds.). The SAGE Encyclopedia of Trans Studies. Vol. 1. Thousand Oaks: SAGE. pp. 389–397. ISBN 978-1-5443-9381-0.
- Bono, Sal (2019). "The Death of Marsha P. Johnson and the Quest for Closure". Inside Edition.
- Brendlen, Kirstyn (2022). "Marsha P. Johnson Park to get new 'ornamental gateway' to cap off renovations, honor park's namesake • Brooklyn Paper". Brooklyn Paper.
- Brier, Jennifer (2004). "AIDS and People with AIDS". In Stein, Marc (ed.). Encyclopedia of Lesbian, Gay, Bisexual and Transgender History in America. Vol. 1. New York: Thomson Gale. pp. 27–34. ISBN 0-684-31427-4.
- Calafell, Bernadette Marie (June 1, 2019). "Narrative Authority, Theory in the Flesh, and the Fight over The Death and Life of Marsha P. Johnson". QED. 6 (2): 26–39. doi:10.14321/qed.6.2.0026. ISSN 2327-1574.
- Carter, David (2010). Stonewall: The Riots That Sparked the Gay Revolution. New York: Macmillan. ISBN 978-0-312-67193-8.
- Chan, Sewell (March 8, 2018). "Marsha P. Johnson, a Transgender Pioneer and Activist". The New York Times.
- Cohen, Stephan (2008). The Gay Liberation Youth Movement in New York: 'An Army of Lovers Cannot Fail'. New York; London: Routledge. ISBN 978-0-203-94057-0.
- Cohen, Stephan (2021). "STAR". In Goldberg, Abbie E.; Beemyn, Genny (eds.). The SAGE Encyclopedia of Trans Studies. Vol. 2. Thousand Oaks: SAGE. pp. 799–801. ISBN 978-1-5443-9381-0.
- Coke, Hope (2020). "The inspiring life of activist and drag queen Marsha P. Johnson". Tatler.
- Collins, Larry (2019). "Transgender Activist Mural Painted in Dallas to Mark Stonewall Riots Anniversary". NBC 5 Dallas-Fort Worth.
- Duberman, Martin B. (1994). Stonewall. New York: Open Road Media. ISBN 978-1-480-42384-8.
- Ellison, Joy; Hoffman, Nicholas (2019). "The Afterward: Sylvia Rivera and Marsha P. Johnson in the Medieval Imaginary". Medieval Feminist Forum. 55 (1): 267–294. doi:10.17077/1536-8742.2140. ISSN 1536-8742.
- France, David (2017). The Death and Life of Marsha P. Johnson (Documentary). Netflix.
- Glasser-Baker, Becca (2019). "National LGBTQ Wall of Honor unveiled at Stonewall Inn". Metro US. Archived from the original on July 26, 2020.
- Gleeson, Jules (2023). "Backlighting the Bleak: Jules Gleeson on Anohni and the Johnsons "My Back Was a Bridge for You to Cross"". TEXTE ZUR KUNST.
- Goodyear, Sheena (2020). "Podcast unearths earliest known recordings of trans icons Marsha P. Johnson and Sylvia Rivera". CBC.
- Gould, Deborah B. (2004). "AIDS Coalition to Unleash Power (ACT UP)". In Stein, Marc (ed.). Encyclopedia of Lesbian, Gay, Bisexual and Transgender History in America. Vol. 1. New York: Thomson Gale. pp. 34–39. ISBN 0-684-31427-4.
- Grmek, Mirko Dražen (1990). History of AIDS: Emergence and Origin of a Modern Pandemic. Princeton: Princeton University Press. ISBN 0-691-08552-8.
- Guyver, Figgy (2019). "Two Transgender Activists to Be Honoured with Statues in New York". Frieze.
- Hickman, Matt (2020). "Brooklyn's East River State Park renamed in honor of late LGBTQ activist and trans icon Marsha P. Johnson". The Architect's Newspaper.
- Holder, Daisy (2024). Queer Disability Through History: The Queer and Disabled Movements Through Their Personalities. Havertown: Pen and Sword History. ISBN 978-1-3990-5057-9.
- Jackson, Jenn M. (2021). "Black feminisms, queer feminisms, trans feminisms: Meditating on Pauli Murray, Shirley Chisholm, and Marsha P. Johnson against the erasure of history". In Hobson, Janell (ed.). The Routledge Companion to Black Women's Cultural Histories. Milton; New York: Routledge. doi:10.4324/9780429243578. ISBN 978-0-429-24357-8.
- Jacobs, Shayna (2012). "EXCLUSIVE: DA reopens unsolved 1992 case involving the 'saint of gay life'". New York Daily News.
- Johnson, Marsha P.; Wicker, Randy (1989). "Marsha P. Johnson & Randy Wicker". Making Gay History (Interview). Interviewed by Marcus, Eric. NOTE: This interview was presented as part of the Making Gay History podcast.
- Kasino, Michael (2012). Pay It No Mind - The Life and Times of Marsha P. Johnson (Documentary). Frameline Films. NOTE: The linked YouTube video is uploaded by the documentary's director, Michael Kasino.
- Keller, Monica; Morris, Jessica (2021). "Johnson, Marsha P.". In Goldberg, Abbie E.; Beemyn, Genny (eds.). The SAGE Encyclopedia of Trans Studies. Vol. 2. Thousand Oaks: SAGE. pp. 802–806. ISBN 978-1-5443-9381-0.
- La Fountain-Stokes, Lawrence (2021). Translocas: The Politics of Puerto Rican Drag and Trans Performance. Ann Arbor: University of Michigan Press. ISBN 978-0-472-12607-1.
- Lee, Benjamin (October 5, 2017). "The Death and Life of Marsha P Johnson review – trans icon inspires stirring documentary". the Guardian.
- Marsha P. Johnson Statue in New York City (Report). Contested Histories. 2025.
- "Marsha P. Johnson". Encycloepdia Britannica. Encyclopædia Britannica, Inc. 2026.
- Maxouris, Christina (2020). "Google Doodle of Marsha P. Johnson, beloved trans-rights activist, will close out Pride month". CNN.
- Newton, Esther (1972). Mother Camp: Female Impersonators in America. Chicago: University of Chicago Press. ISBN 978-0-226-57760-9.
- Ng, Samuel Galen (2013). "Trans Power! Sylvia Lee Rivera's STAR and the Black Panther Party". Left History. 17 (1). doi:10.25071/1913-9632.39213. ISSN 1913-9632.
- Panico, Rebecca (2020). "Marsha P. Johnson, late LGBTQ activist, to get monument in N.J. hometown". NJ.com.
- Pelly, Jenn (2023). "Anohni Isn't Afraid of the Darkness". The New York Times.
- "A Photograph of Marsha P. Johnson and Randy Wicker Holding a Quilt for David Combs". Digital Transgender Archive.
- Piepzna-Samarasinha, Leah Lakshmi (2019). "Disability Justice/Stonewall's Legacy, or: Love Mad Trans Black Women When They Are Alive and Dead, Let Their Revolutions Teach Your Resistance All the Time". QED: A Journal in GLBTQ Worldmaking. 6 (2). Michigan State University Press: 54–62. doi:10.14321/qed.6.2.0054. ISSN 2327-1590.
- "Pride Month: Who was Marsha P. Johnson and why were they so important?". BBC. 2020.
- Rivera, Sylvia; Johnson, Marsha P.; et al. (1970). "Sylvia Rivera & Marsha P. Johnson, 1970". Making Gay History (Interview). Interviewed by Cowan, Liza. NOTE: This interview was uncovered by archivist Brian Ferree and presented by Eric Marcus as part of the Making Gay History podcast.
- Rivera, Sylvia (1973). "Y'all Better Quiet Down". Street Transvestite Action Revolutionaries: Survival, Revolt, and Queer Antagonist Struggle. Untorelli Press. pp. 30–31.
  NOTE: This book is primarily a collection of primary source documents. No editor is credited, but activist and historian Tourmaline claims to have uncovered much of the archival material. See "Street Evangelists and Transgender Saints: Sylvia Rivera, Marsha P. Johnson, and the Religions of the Afro-Americas" by Ahmad Greene-Hayes, p. 46.
- Rivera, Sylvia (2002). "Queens in Exile, the Forgotten Ones". In Nestle, Joan; Howell, Clare; Wilchins, Riki Anne (eds.). GenderQueer: Voices From Beyond the Sexual Binary. Los Angeles; New York: Alyson Books. pp. 67–85. ISBN 978-1-55583-730-3.
- Smilges, J. Logan (2022). "Neurotrans". TSQ: Transgender Studies Quarterly. 9 (4): 634–652. doi:10.1215/23289252-10133831. ISSN 2328-9252.
- Stein, Marc (2019). "Introduction". In Stein, Marc (ed.). The Stonewall Riots: A Documentary History. NYU Press. ISBN 978-1-4798-9571-7.
- Stein, Marc (2021). "Stonewall Riots". In Goldberg, Abbie E.; Beemyn, Genny (eds.). The SAGE Encyclopedia of Trans Studies. Vol. 2. Thousand Oaks: SAGE. pp. 802–806. ISBN 978-1-5443-9381-0.
- Stryker, Susan (2017). Transgender History. Berkeley: Seal Press. ISBN 978-1-58005-690-8.
- "Sylvia Rivera and Marsha P. Johnson: Listen to the Newly Unearthed Interview with Street Transvestite Action Revolutionaries". The New York Historical. 2019.
- Teppo, Sandra (September 19, 2022). "Marsha P. Johnson: Who Creates the Most Impact?". Sankofa Journal of Interdisciplinary Studies. 2. doi:10.15353/sankofa.v2/4745. ISSN 2564-3010.
- Tourmaline (2025). Marsha: The Joy and Defiance of Marsha P. Johnson. New York: Tiny Reparations Books. ISBN 978-0-59318-568-1.
- Venkatraman, Sakshi (July 1, 2020). "Over 75,000 sign petition to have Marsha P. Johnson statue replace Columbus monument". NBC News.
- Watson, Steve (1979). "Stonewall 1979: The Drag of Politics". The Village Voice.
- White, Heather R. (2024). "Coming Out in the Parish Hall: New York's Gay Movement and the Church of the Holy Apostles, 1969–70". QTR. 1 (2). Duke University Press: 149–170. doi:10.1215/29944724-11365529. ISSN 2994-4724.
