= Quentin Bell (disambiguation) =

Quentin Bell (1910–1996) was an English art historian and author.

Quentin Bell may also refer to:

- Bubba Monroe (1960–2022), American professional wrestler and trainer
- Quentin Bell (activist) (born 1987/88), African-American transgender rights activist
