= The Death and Life of Marsha P. Johnson =

2017 American documentary film

- Directed by: David France
- Written by: David France; Mark Blane
- Produced by: David France; L. A. Teodosio; Joy A. Tomchin; Kimberly Reed
- Cinematography: Tom Bergmann; Adam Uhl
- Edited by: Tyler H. Walk
- Music by: Bryce Dessner
- Production company: Public Square Films
- Distributed by: Netflix
- Release dates: April 21, 2017 (Tribeca); October 6, 2017
- Running time: 105 minutes
- Country: United States
- Language: English

The Death and Life of Marsha P. Johnson is a 2017 American documentary film directed by David France. It chronicles Marsha P. Johnson and Sylvia Rivera, prominent figures in gay liberation and transgender rights movement in New York City from the 1960s to the 1990s and co-founders of Street Transvestite Action Revolutionaries. The film centers on activist Victoria Cruz's investigation into Johnson's death in 1992, which was initially ruled a suicide by police despite suspicious circumstances. It is France's second film, following How to Survive a Plague (2012).

== Release ==
The film premiered in the documentary competition section at the Tribeca Film Festival on April 21, 2017. In June 2017, Netflix acquired worldwide rights to the film. The film was released on the streaming service on October 6, 2017.

== Reception ==
On review aggregator website Rotten Tomatoes, the film holds an approval rating of 96%, based on 28 reviews, and an average rating of 7.4/10. The site's critical consensus reads, "The Death and Life of Marsha P. Johnson uses its belated investigation into an activist's murder as the framework for a sobering look at the ongoing battle for equal rights." On Metacritic, the film has a weighted average score of 76 out of 100, based on 11 critics, indicating "generally favorable reviews".

== Controversy ==
On October 7, 2017, transgender filmmaker Tourmaline wrote on Instagram alleging that France appropriated her research from a grant application for her film project (which would become Happy Birthday, Marsha!, a narrative short). France denied the allegation saying that he was already well into the research for his documentary when he first became aware of Tourmaline's work, while acknowledging that he "witnessed the obstacles [Tourmaline] faces as an artist who is also a transgender woman of color, obstacles that have been far less onerous" for him. On October 11, a more detailed account of Tourmaline's allegation was published on the Teen Vogue website. Subsequent investigations by Jezebel and The Advocate found no evidence in support of the allegation.
