= A Love Letter to Marsha =

Monument in New York City, U.S.

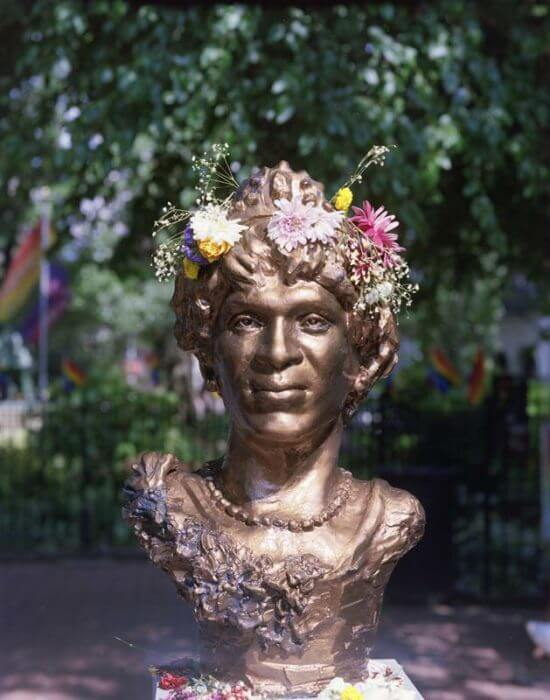
- The sculpture in 2021
- Artist: Julian Prairie
- Year: 2021
- Type: Sculpture
- Medium: Bronze
- Location: New York City

A Love Letter to Marsha is a sculpture featuring the LGBTQ activist Marsha P. Johnson by American artist Julian Prairie. It was originally erected in Christopher Park along Christopher Street in the West Village section of Manhattan, New York. The monument was completed in 2021 and was notably the first statue of a transgender individual in New York City. The sculpture features a life-size bust of Johnson made of bronze with holes to insert flowers. It is a work of guerrilla art but was later approved by New York Park Services, making it the first sculpture of a transgender person in New York City. It currently resides at the Lesbian, Gay, Bisexual & Transgender Community Center.

== Background ==
Transgender activists planned the sculpture following unrealized plans for an official sculpture of Johnson and Sylvia Rivera in 2019. It is the city's first statue of a transgender person and the eighth statue of a woman among New York City's 800 park monuments. The sculpture was placed several feet away from the controversial Stonewall National Monument. In 2015, activists vandalized the statues with brown paint and wigs for "whitewashing" the Stonewall riots.

Artist Julian Prairie used a silicone mold to cast the bronze bust. They then had a team of activists erect the sculpture in Christopher Park on August 24, 2021, what would have been Johnson's 76th birthday. The group used 150 pounds of cement to hold the wooden pedestal in place. The sculpture includes a bronze plaque with a quote by activist and Stonewall participant Thomas Lanigan-Schmidt: "History isn't something you look back at and say it was inevitable, it happens because people make decisions that are sometimes very impulsive and of the moment, but those moments are cumulative realities."

In 2022, A Love Letter to Marsha was moved to the in Lesbian, Gay, Bisexual & Transgender Community Center.
