= Happy Birthday, Marsha! =

- Film poster
- Directed by: Tourmaline; Sasha Wortzel
- Written by: Tourmaline; Sasha Wortzel
- Produced by: Tourmaline; Sasha Wortzel
- Starring: Mya Taylor; Cherno Biko; Eve Lindley; Cyrus Grace Dunham
- Release date: March 11, 2018 (Los Angeles)
- Running time: 14 minutes
- Country: United States
- Language: English

Happy Birthday, Marsha! is a 2018 fictional short film that imagines the gay and transgender rights pioneers Marsha P. Johnson and Sylvia Rivera in the hours that led up to the 1969 Stonewall riots in New York City. The film stars Mya Taylor as Johnson and Eve Lindley as Rivera.

It was written, directed, and produced by Tourmaline and Sasha Wortzel. The filmmakers raised over $25,000 on Kickstarter to fund the film. The film is a sponsored project of Women Make Movies.

The film premiered in Los Angeles at Outfest Fusion in March 2018. The film also showed at the 2018 BFI London Flare LGBTQ+ Film Festival.

The film received some press after Tourmaline accused David France of using some of her labor and footage in his 2017 documentary, The Death and Life of Marsha P. Johnson. France denied the allegations. Subsequent investigative articles in The Advocate and Jezebel found Tourmaline's accusations baseless.

== Synopsis ==
The fictional treatment is inspired by the various, conflicting rumors surrounding the Stonewall uprising of June 1969, including the mistaken belief that the uprising took place on Marsha P. Johnson's birthday.

It begins with Johnson inviting some friends to a birthday party, and preparing for the celebration. However, after a friend turns down the invitation, Johnson decides to go to the Stonewall Inn (a gay bar in Greenwich Village), planning to read poetry to the Stonewall audience.

At the bar, Johnson is confronted by event security, who claim people aren't allowed to perform in drag. Johnson is continually hassled by security and law enforcement throughout the film. After a joyous, drag performance to a supportive audience, Johnson is having a drink at the bar when the two police officers from earlier in the film try to remove Johnson from the bar. An enraged Johnson throws a drink at the officers, immediately inciting chaos in the bar, starting the Stonewall riots.

== Cast ==
- Eve Lindley as Sylvia Rivera
- Cyrus Grace Dunham as Junior
- Ken King as Officer Staggert
- Rios O'Leary-Tagiuri as Bambi
- Silas Howard as Stonewall Manager
- Mya Taylor as Marsha P. Johnson
- Kristen Parker Lovell as Afro Girl

== Historical context ==
The Stonewall uprising was a series of spontaneous protests led by members of the gay community against the police, that took place at the Stonewall Inn, a gay bar in New York City's Greenwich Village, during June, 1969. The first riot began in response to a police raid of the bar in the early hours of June 28. Nine policemen arrived to arrest employees for operating the bar without a liquor license, and the police proceeded to assault and arrest patrons and clear the bar. Police had recently raided two other gay bars in Greenwich Village, but the uprising at the Stonewall Inn marked the first time gay patrons had fought back against the police.

Marsha P. Johnson (August 24, 1945 – July 6, 1992) was an African-American Gay Liberation activist and self-identified drag queen, active from the 1960s through the 1990s in New York City and internationally. Johnson fought on the front lines of the Stonewall riots against the police. Though some mistakenly credit Johnson with starting the riots, Johnson was always open about having arrived at the Stonewall Inn at 3 a.m. after the riot had already begun. Sylvia Rivera (July 2, 1951 – February 19, 2002), a younger drag queen of Puerto Rican and Venezuelan descent who later in life came to identify as a transgender person, was also a gay and transgender rights activist in New York City whose activism began around the time of the Stonewall riots. While Rivera spoke about being at the riots, Marsha P. Johnson and others, including Stonewall historian David Carter, disputed her claims based on contradictory descriptions Rivera gave and eyewitness accounts that deny her presence.

== Historical inaccuracies ==
The film has been described as "ahistorical," as it has major historical discrepancies. Some of these discrepancies include the basic premise that Johnson was throwing a birthday party on June 28, the first night of the Stonewall riots, but that was impossible since Johnson's birthday has been documented to be August 24. The short film claims that Sylvia Rivera was fighting with Marsha P. Johnson in the riots, but Rivera's presence has been denied by many Stonewall veterans, including Johnson. Johnson stated multiple times that Rivera had "fallen asleep in Bryant Park after taking heroin" at the outbreak of the Stonewall riot and that Johnson "woke [Rivera] up to tell her about the riots."

The film depicts Johnson as the first person to fight back against the police, but that account was also denied by Johnson, who gave interviews about arriving at the bar at three in the morning, after "the place was already on fire ... it was a raid already. The riots had already started." Therefore, Johnson could not have been the first person to fight back at the riot.

== Controversy ==
In a 2017 Instagram post, Tourmaline claimed filmmaker David France took inspiration from her grant application video and research to make his documentary, The Death and Life of Marsha P. Johnson. In a tweet addressed to him, she accused, "your film only exists because I put that video online." In a Teen Vogue op-ed, she expressed her concerns that France succeeded in making the film she wanted to make because he is white and cisgender, and has access to resources she does not, while her work is marginalized due to being a trans woman of color. France responded on social media and in interviews where he acknowledged his privileges, but also "flatly denied" all allegations of plagiarism.

Investigative articles in The Advocate and Jezebel found Tourmaline's accusations of plagiarism baseless, stating that France had not seen Tourmaline's grant application and had only been told about the project due to mutual friends knowing he had also spoken, since the 1990s, about making a film about Johnson.

The "video that [Tourmaline] put online", which she accused France of stealing, was of Sylvia Rivera's famous "Gay Power!" speech. It was filmed at NYC Pride in 1973, 10 years before Tourmaline was born, by the Lesbians Organized for Video Experience (LOVE) Collective. It had been shown in the Queer community since 1973, and reached international audiences on PBS in 1995 as part of Arthur Dong's documentary, The Question of Equality: Out Rage '69, as well as on HBO in 2011. France told journalists, "I knew those clips. Those clips were available in multiple places. The majority of the stuff that was on her page she had borrowed from Randy [Wicker]."

Tourmaline had uploaded the "Gay Power!" video clip to Vimeo in 2012. While Tourmaline falsely claimed ownership of the footage in the op-ed, in a tweet on April 17, 2017, Tourmaline admitted she stole the footage: "I stole it and uploaded it in 2012 as a form of direct action against assimilation and historical erasure of trans life". When the LOVE Collective issued a copyright violation claim against Tourmaline and had their footage removed from Tourmaline's Vimeo channel, Tourmaline accused France of being behind the removal. LOVE Collective's Tracy Fitz confirmed to The Advocate that they, as the license holders, took down Tourmaline's illegal usage, and that France had nothing to do with it. They also confirmed that France paid them for all use of their footage in his films (predominantly footage never used by Tourmaline).

In interviews with journalists, France reminded readers that as a gay man who lived through the AIDS pandemic, he not only knew Marsha P. Johnson, but that he used both personal knowledge and footage he already had of Johnson that he had shot at ACT UP and other AIDS-related events for his documentary, How to Survive a Plague. He also provided documents to investigators about his plans to make a film about Johnson, which he had been considering ever since Johnson's death in 1992. Speaking to The Advocate, France did concede one point: He acknowledged that he was present at Cooper Union in November 2015 when Tourmaline exhibited work that included a rare clip of Johnson, speaking in a basement, shot in 1991 by New York University professor Darrell Wilson, previously inaccessible to anyone but New York University film students. France had subsequently obtained a copy of the footage, of which a 14-second excerpt is included in his documentary. While France stated that he had been previously aware of the footage's existence, The Advocate report agreed that in this one instance, "the fact that his film uses this video after he saw it for the first time during Tourmaline's presentation does support her claim that 'clearly France has seen and learned from our work.'"
