= Mariah Lopez =

American activist

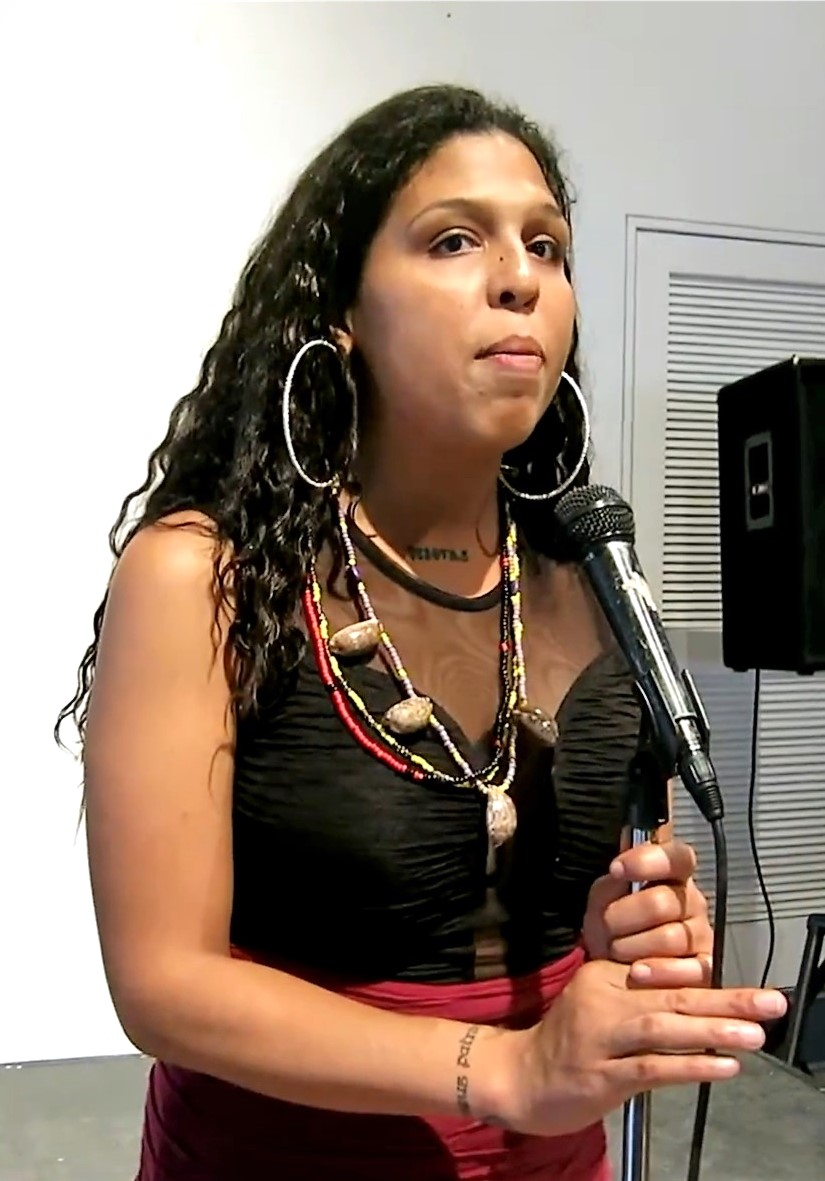
- Lopez speaks at NYC LGBT community center in 2013
- Born: 1985 (age 40–41); New York City, United States
- Occupation: Executive director
- Known for: Transgender rights activism
- Website: strategictransalliance.org

Mariah Lopez (born 1985) is an American activist based in New York City. She has been a plaintiff in multiple lawsuits related to civil and human rights, and has lobbied for legislation and greater policy protections for LGBTQ people. Lopez is the executive director for STARR (Strategic Trans Alliance for Radical Reform), a transgender rights advocacy group.

== Early life and education ==
Lopez was born and raised in the Amsterdam Houses on the Upper West Side of New York City. At age 9, she was placed in foster care after her mother and grandmother died. She resided in a variety of group homes, including group homes for gay and transgender youth. In 2001, Lopez met Sylvia Rivera after she was referred by a social worker to the Transy House for housing. Lopez left high school before graduation and later completed a GED and then attended college.

At age 13, she became the lead plaintiff in a 1999 class action lawsuit that alleged routine violence and psychological abuse was perpetrated against gay and lesbian children in New York foster care. After being placed in an all-male group home at age 16, she sued pursuant to the New York Human Rights Law and at age 17 won the right to wear skirts and dresses. At age 20, she lost a lawsuit she filed to have the cost of her gender affirmation surgery covered by New York City, after winning at the trial court level and losing on appeal. Two years later, New York City changed its policy to begin covering surgery. Before her surgery case was completed, she sued the New York City Police Department, alleging false arrests for loitering and assaults during "gender checks"; the case was settled with a $35,000 payment to Lopez, and she then went to Florida for her surgery.

== Activism ==
In 2006, at age 21, Lopez testified at a New York City Board of Health public hearing in support of a proposal to allow gender to be changed on birth certificates without gender affirmation surgery. In 2012, she lobbied for a reexamination of the 1992 death of Marsha P. Johnson, a Black transgender rights activist. The case was first considered a suicide, then in 2002 changed to "undetermined", and in 2012 the New York Police Department re-opened the case as a possible homicide. In 2013, Lopez protested the misgendering of Islan Nettles during a vigil in honor of Nettles following her death after a violent assault.

In 2014, Lopez started the Strategic Transgender Alliance for Radical Reform (STARR) as a renamed version of the transgender rights group Street Transvestite Action Revolutionaries (STAR), which had been founded by Marsha P. Johnson and Sylvia Rivera. In 2014, she expressed her support as a STARR activist after the New York City Administration for Children's Services (ACS) paid for gender affirmation surgery for a 21-year-old former foster care child pursuant to the ACS policy to cover the costs that began in 2010.

Lopez has also advocated specialized housing units for gay and transgender inmates in jails and prisons, including after the closure of the units at Rikers Island in December 2005. In 2014, she announced the opening of a specialized housing unit at Rikers after advocating for its creation.

Between 2017 and 2018, Lopez filed multiple lawsuits related to her experience with Marsha's House, which was the only shelter for LGBTQ adults in New York City at the time. By 2019, some of the cases resulted in two confidential settlements for Lopez, and in 2022, New York City agreed to increase and improve access to shelters for trans people, to require staff to sign non-discrimination agreements, and to conduct training for staff, after a case was certified as a class action lawsuit and the Center for Constitutional Rights joined in 2019 to represent the plaintiffs. As part of the settlement agreement, the city is required to regularly report to Lopez on its compliance with the settlement terms.

In 2021, Lopez advocated for real flowers to be planted in a park that was named for Marsha P. Johnson in 2020, after the state parks department proposed a plastic installation, and she proposed an additional memorial garden for Johnson, Rivera, and other transgender people at Gansevoort Peninsula. She has filed a lawsuit opposing a proposed beach development at the Christopher Street Pier, seeking an assessment of the historic significance of the area.

By July 2022, she had filed 14 lawsuits against government agencies.

== Personal life ==
Lopez is a Black-Latina trans woman.
