= Ladies and Gentlemen (Warhol series) =

1975 series of portraits by Andy Warhol

- Artist: Andy Warhol
- Year: 1975
- Medium: Acrylic and silkscreen inks on canvas
- Movement: Pop Art

Ladies and Gentlemen is a 1975 series of portraits by American artist Andy Warhol. Commissioned in 1974 by the Italian art dealer Luciano Anselmino, the series comprises 268 silkscreen paintings and a portfolio of ten screenprints issued in an edition of 250. Based on Polaroid photographs taken by Warhol, the portraits depict Black American and Latinx transgender women and drag queens. Although one of Warhol's lesser-known series, it provided early visibility to a marginalized community and marked a departure from his celebrity portraiture, documenting New York's 1970s underground culture while exploring themes of identity, gender performance, and the ethics of representation.

== Background ==
In May 1974, Italian art dealer Luciano Anselmino approached Pop artist Andy Warhol in Turin about commissioning a series of large-edition prints and possibly paintings. Anselmino suggested that Warhol make portraits of drag queens. According to Bob Colacello, then editor of Interview magazine, Warhol initially dismissed the idea, saying that "drag queens were out." Anselmino persisted, proposing portraits of Candy Darling, Jackie Curtis, and Holly Woodlawn. Warhol rejected the suggestions, noting that Darling was dead and that Curtis and Woodlawn would continually ask for more money whenever one of their portraits sold.

Warhol asked Anselmino to suggest another subject, but Anselmino later returned to the idea of drag queens. He specified that the subjects should not be "beautiful transvestites who could pass for women," but rather "funny-looking ones, with beards, who were obviously men trying to pass." Warhol eventually agreed to the project and suggested that Colacello pose in drag for the portraits. Although Warhol offered to give him a portrait, Colacello initially declined, saying that he did not want to be immortalized in drag.

During another trip to Europe in July 1974, Warhol's manager Fred Hughes brought Anselmino along. Anselmino told Warhol that he had secured several hundred thousand dollars in funding for the project, as well as an agreement for the series to be exhibited at the Palazzo dei Diamanti in Ferrara. After returning to New York later that month, Colacello posed in drag for Warhol at the Factory, but Warhol deemed the resulting photographs "unusable."

== Production ==
A set of Ladies and Gentlemen screenprints

Colacello, along with Factory associates Ronnie Cutrone and Vincent Fremont, and makeup artist Corey Tippin, found models for the series at the Gilded Grape, which was a popular nightclub in the queer community, near Times Square in New York. They would ask potential models to pose for "a friend" for $50 per half-hour. The following day, they would show up at the Factory, where Warhol, whom they never named, would take their Polaroids. Some of the models would say, "Tell your friend I do a lot more for fifty bucks" the following time they saw them at the Gilded Grape. While most of the sitters had no idea who they were posing for, Wilhelmina Ross and Marsha P. Johnson were exceptions, as both had performed with the drag troupe Hot Peaches. Founder and director Jimmy Camicia recalled staging the group's first shows in the loft of Warhol superstar Jackie Curtis.

Warhol began creating the silkscreens for the Ladies and Gentlemen series toward the end of the year. On December 28, 1974, he was captured on videotape painting a portrait at the Factory. Shortly after, it was reported that Warhol was working on a series of portraits of transvestites.

He produced 268 vibrantly colored silkscreen paintings. He also created a portfolio of ten screenprints, each a different image, published in 1975 in an edition of 250.

== Subjects ==
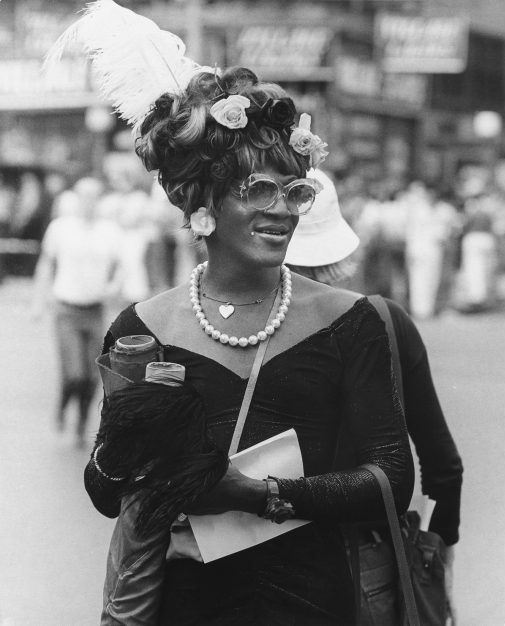
LGBTQ activist Marsha P. Johnson in the 1970s, a subject of Ladies and Gentlemen

Warhol took over 500 photographs of 14 models, though he did not use all for the final series. An official list of the sitters for the Ladies and Gentlemen series was released by the Warhol Foundation in 2014. This included 13 names that they could identify:

- Marsha P. Johnson
- Alphanso Panell
- Iris
- Wilhelmina Ross
- Broadway
- Easha McCleary
- Helen/Harry Morales
- Ivette
- Kim
- Lurdes
- Michele Long
- Monique and Vicki Peters

== Exhibitions ==
A few portraits from the series were included in a major exhibition of Warhol's artwork, Andy Warhol: Paintings 1962-1975, at the Baltimore Museum of Art in Maryland from July 22, 1975 to September 28, 1975. The exhibition was originally scheduled to close on September 14 but was extended for two weeks, allowing Warhol to visit the museum on the original closing date to sign copies of his book The Philosophy of Andy Warhol.

The complete series was exhibited at the Palazzo dei Diamanti in Ferrara from October to December 1975. Warhol attended the opening on October 26, where he participated in a press conference presided over by Signor Farina, director of the Palazzo. The event was filmed by students of the Palazzo's art school, with art critic Janus (Roberto Gianoglio) conducting the interview. An accompanying book, Ladies and Gentlemen was published by Gabriele Mazzotta in Milan.

Warhol attended the opening of Andy Warhol's Ladies and Gentlemen at Galleria Romani Adami in Rome on October 27, 1975. The exhibition featured serigraphs from the series.

Two portraits from the series were included in an exhibition of Warhol's artwork at the Greenberg Gallery in Clayton, Missouri, from October to December 1975. Ladies and Gentlemen was subsequently exhibited at Galerie Bischofberger in Zurich and at the gallery's location in St. Moritz from February to March 1976. From March to April 1976, Ladies and Gentlemen, along with portraits of Mick Jagger, Mao, and gallerist Tina Freeman, was exhibited at the Freeman-Anacker Gallery in New Orleans.

From March 12 to November 15, 2020, the series was included in the exhibition Andy Warhol at the Tate Modern in London.

From March 14 to July 19, 2026, marking the 50th anniversary of the series, Andy Warhol: Ladies and Gentlemen was exhibited at the Palazzo dei Diamanti in Ferrara.

== Critical reception ==
George E. Jordan of The Times-Picayune wrote: "Warhol forces the photographic image to take a second seat to his overlays of lush brushwork and vibrant color. He uses an openess [sic] of form perfected in early years by Picasso, Cezanne and Matisse. An area of color encompasses another area, giving interest and strength without destroying the imagery of the work. In this case, the 'Ladies and Gentlemen' photographed by Warhol are the imagery."

== Collections ==
In 1994, the Baltimore Museum of Art acquired two portraits from the series. The Metropolitan Museum of Art in New York holds one painting from the series. The Museum Brandhorst in Munich holds Ladies and Gentlemen (Wilhelmina Ross). The Andy Warhol Museum in Pittsburgh has several paintings and prints.
