= Sasha Wortzel =

American artist and filmmaker

Sasha Wortzel is an artist, filmmaker, educator, and activist, based in New York City.

In 2017, in collarboration with Tourmaline, she wrote, directed, and produced the short Happy Birthday, Marsha! She and Tourmaline raised over $25,000 on Kickstarter to fund the film.

Wortzel co-created the documentary We Came to Sweat: The Legend of Starlite. The film concerns the community efforts to stop the eviction of the Starlite Lounge, the oldest black gay bar in Brooklyn. It was a highlight of the 2014 New York Lesbian, Gay, Bisexual, & Transgender Film Festival.

Wortzel's interactive artwork 42 Butter Lane (2011) was included in the 2014 exhibition Roaming House at A.I.R. Gallery. The exhibition, curated by Mira Schor, sought to update the 1972 feminist art installation Womanhouse.

Her first feature documentary. River of Grass, premiered in 2025, described as "an ode to the Florida Everglades past and present, told through the prescient writings of Marjory Stoneman Douglas, and those who today call the region home."
