= Che Gossett =

American writer, scholar, and archivist

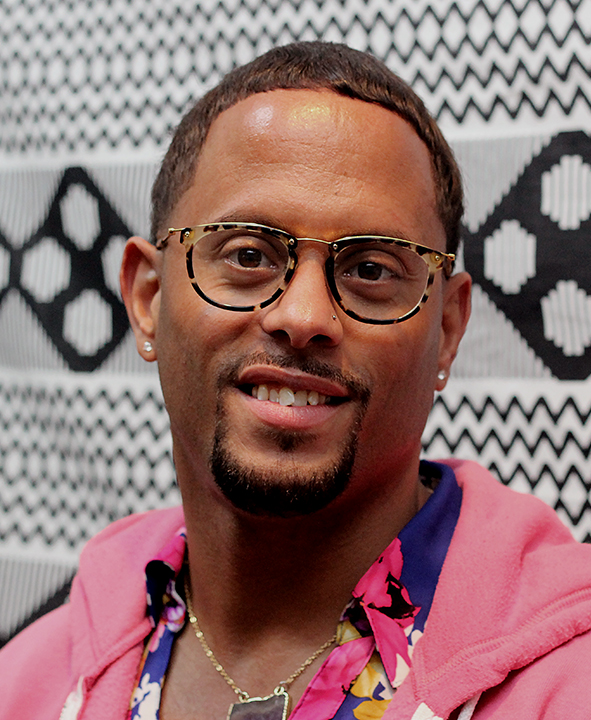
- Gossett in 2019
- Born: Massachusetts, U.S.
- Occupations: Writer and archivist
- Known for: Queer and transgender studies
- Family: Tourmaline (sister)

Che Gossett is an American writer, scholar, and archivist. They have written extensively on black and trans visibility, black trans aesthetics, capitalism, and queer, trans and black radicalism, resistance and abolition.

== Early life and education ==
Gossett grew up in Roxbury, Massachusetts, with their twin, Caitlin, and their sibling, activist and filmmaker Tourmaline. Their mother was a union organizer and their father was a Vietnam War veteran and former member of the Memphis-based activist group, The Invaders.

Gossett attended Rafael Hernandez Elementary School and Nativity Preparatory School as a child, and attended River's Country Day High School before ultimately graduating from New Mission High School. As a teen, Gossett participated in youth conferences and HIV peer education.

After graduating from high school, they attended Morehouse College and graduated with their BA in African American studies in 2003. Gossett also received an MAT from Brown University in 2004, and an MA in History from the University in Pennsylvania in 2010. They received their Doctorate in Women's and Gender Studies from Rutgers University in 2021.

From 2014 to 2019, Gossett served as the Community Archivist and Student Coordinator at the Barnard Center for Research on Women. From 2021 to 2024, Gossett was the racial justice postdoctoral scholar at the Initiative for a Just Society, Columbia Law School. From 2022 to 2024 Gossett was a visiting scholar at Harvard Law School, in the Animal Law and Policy Program. They are currently the Associate Director of the Center for Research in Feminist, Queer, and Transgender Studies at the University of Pennsylvania.

== Publications and Lectures ==
They have published their writing in Trap Door: Trans Cultural Production and the Politics of Visibility, Death and Other Penalties: Continental Philosophers on Prisons and Capital Punishment, Transgender Studies Reader, The Scholar & Feminist Online, Los Angeles Review of Books, and Frieze. Gossett has lectured and performed at The Museum of Modern Art, MoMA PS1, Whitney Museum of American Art, New Museum and A.I.R. Gallery.

In 2023, Gossett joined the Pacific Northwest College of Art at Willamette University as a Scholar in Residence and graduate seminar instructor in critical race theory. Che has co-edited a special issue of TSQ journal "Trans in a Time of HIV/AIDS" with Professor Eva Hayward, and their syllabus on trans and non-binary methods for art and art history co-authored with Professor David Getsy won the College Art Journal Award for Distinction.

== Fellowships and awards ==
- Visiting Scholar, Art History department, Corpus Christi College and Centre for Visual Culture, University of Cambridge (2023)
- Visiting Scholar, Oxford Centre for Life Writing (2023)
- Gloria E. Anzaldúa Award from the American Studies Association (2014)
- Sylvia Rivera Award in Transgender Studies from the Center for Gay and Lesbian Studies at the City University of New York (2014)
- Martin Duberman Research Scholar Award from the New York Public Library (2014)
- 2017-2018 Queer Arts Mentor
- Helena Rubenstein Fellow, Whitney Museum Independent Study Program (2019-2020)
- Racial Justice Postdoctoral Fellowship, Columbia Law School (2021-2024)
- Art Journal Award for Distinction, College Art Association (2022)
- Ruth Stephan Fellow, Beinecke Library, Yale University (2022)
- Animal Law and Policy Program Fellow, Harvard Law School (2022-2024)
