= Quentin Bell (activist) =

American activist

- Born: 1987 or 1988 (age 38–39); Selma, Alabama
- Education: Alabama State University
- Occupation: Activist

Quentin Bell (born 1987/88) is an activist for transgender rights in the African-American LGBT community. He is the co-founder, and from 2012 to February 2024 was the executive director of, The Knights and Orchids Society, a non-profit based in Selma, Alabama that is led by and provides healthcare services to Black trans, queer, and gender non-conforming people.

== Work and activism ==
Bell co-founded The Knights and Orchids Society in 2012 with his wife Jennine. The organization evolved from a fraternity that Bell founded at Alabama State University in 2009. The nonprofit provides free gender-affirming health and wellness services, with priority given to Black trans people.

Bell has spoken out on state bills that affect transgender rights, including access to restrooms and healthcare for trans children.

== Education and personal life ==
Bell received a Bachelor's degree in Business Administration from Alabama State University. He graduated from the Stanford LGBTQ Executive Leadership Program in 2019.

Bell, a trans man, underwent gender transition in his late 20s. He and his wife Jennine live in Selma with their children.

== Awards and honors ==
- 2017: Community Grantmaking Fellow, Trans Justice Funding Project
- 2019: Champion of Pride, The Advocate
- 2020: Victory Empowerment Fellow, Victory Institute
- 2022: Time 100 Next 2022 List, Time magazine
