= David France (writer/filmmaker) =

American journalist and filmmaker (born 1959)

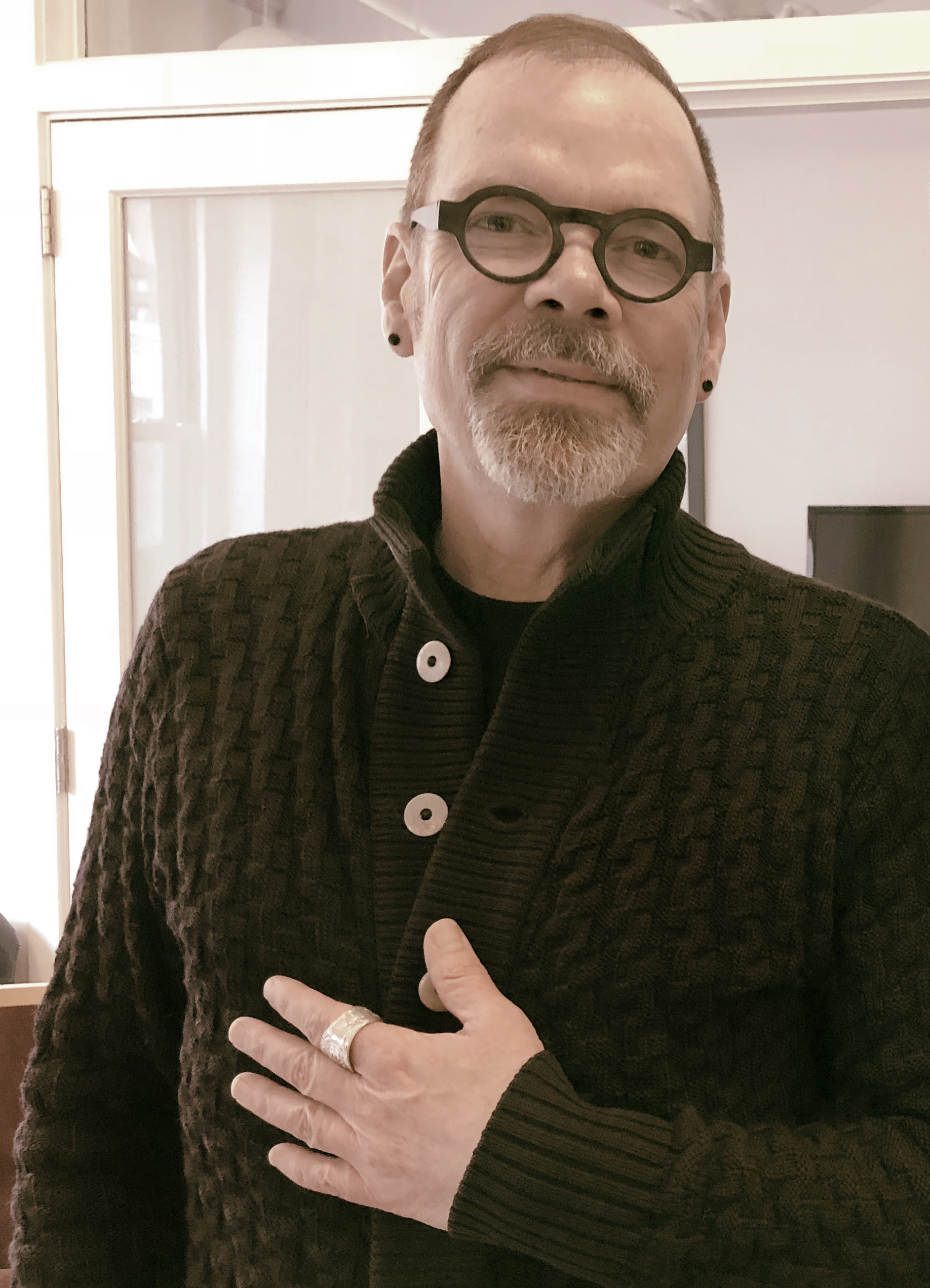
- David France In New York City
- Born: 1959 (age 66–67)
- Occupations: Investigative reporter, non-fiction author, and filmmaker.
- Notable work: How to Survive a Plague (2012 film, 2016 book)
- Website: www.davidfrance.com

David France (born 1959) is an American investigative reporter, non-fiction author, and filmmaker. He is a former Newsweek senior editor, and has published in New York magazine, The New Yorker, The New York Times Magazine, GQ, and others. France, who is gay, is best known for his investigative journalism on LGBTQ topics.

France has been nominated for an Oscar and multiple Emmy Awards. He has also earned a George Foster Peabody Award, a Lambda Literary Award, and the Baillie Gifford Prize for nonfiction.

In June 2007, France appeared on The Colbert Report to discuss the scientific basis that homosexuality is genetic. In 2017, he appeared on Late Night with Seth Meyers to discuss his film about gay liberation activist Marsha P. Johnson.

In 2009, he co-founded Public Square Films with Joy A. Tomchin.

== Early career ==
=== Journalism ===
France published his first pieces of reporting in Gay Community News in the early 1980s, and soon was assistant editor at the New York Native and contributor to the Village Voice. His founding interest in journalism was the HIV/AIDS crisis. France had been reporting on the U.S. AIDS epidemic since its early years, having moved from Kalamazoo, Michigan, to New York City in June 1981, just 2 weeks before the first newspaper report about the disease appeared in The New York Times and living in the epicenter of the East Coast epidemic through its first decade, losing his boyfriend of 5 years to AIDS in 1992.

After a short stint at the New York Post, from which he was fired for being gay, he moved to Central America to work as a war correspondent covering the region's multiple crises in the mid-80s for Religion News Service and others. He spent many years writing for women's magazines, including Glamour, where he was National Affairs Editor, before moving to Newsweek as Senior Editor in 1999 and New York Magazine as Contributing Editor in 2001.

His articles have been collected in a number of books and have won many awards. A 2007 article France wrote for GQ, Dying to Come Out: The War On Gays in Iraq, won a GLAAD Media Award. He spent a year with the family of a boy who committed suicide and undertook a forensic approach in an article about it for the Ladies' Home Journal. The piece, entitled "Broken Promises", which he wrote with Diane Salvatore, won a Mental Health America 'Excellence in Mental Health Journalism' award in 2008.

== Awards and recognition, journalism ==
In 2012, he was named to the "OUT 100," the annual list of 100 LGBTQ "people of the year" published by Out Magazine.

In 2019, he was awarded a MacDowell Fellowship from the MacDowell Colony and the Calderwood Journalism Fellowship for 2019, in support of long-form journalism.

In June 2020, in honor of the 50th anniversary of the first LGBTQ Pride parade, Queerty named him among the fifty heroes "leading the nation toward equality, acceptance, and dignity for all people".

== Books ==
=== Our Fathers ===
France, who covered the Catholic sexual abuse scandal in the United States for Newsweek, turned his work into a well-reviewed and comprehensive history of the issue in the American church. "Stunning in its insight ... France writes with compassion and intelligence," wrote John D. Thomas in the Atlanta Journal & Constitution. Writing in The New York Times, Janet Maslin said: "No matter how thoroughly this material has been presented by other reporters, the effect of this cumulative retelling is devastating."

The book was adapted by Showtime for a film by the same name, which received multiple Emmy Award nominations and one from the Writers Guild of America.

=== The Confession ===
Written with former Governor of New Jersey Jim McGreevey, the book was a New York Times best seller, debuting at #3 in nonfiction hardcover sales and #1 in biography. It chronicles the Governor's rise to power and the lengths to which he went to hide the fact of his gayness.

=== How to Survive a Plague ===
Published in 2016, How to Survive a Plague is considered "the definitive book on AIDS activism."

A blend of academic history and primary accounts, it is considered a sequel to (and correction of) Randy Shilts's And the Band Played On. France weaves the intimate personal narratives of some of the most prominent figures in the era — including Mathilde Krim, Joseph Sonnabend, Larry Kramer, Peter Staley, Michael Callen, Robert Gallo, and Luc Montagnier— into a critically praised narrative of flawed personalities, incompatible politics, human desperation, and resistance. France shows how the arrival of life-saving antiretrovirals in 1996 was only possible due to a group of citizen scientists pushing Big Pharma along.

One of the best-reviewed books of the year, it was named to numerous best-of and top-ten lists, including The New York Times's "100 Notable Books of 2016." Richard Canning described the book as "richly suggestive but also carefully objective" in Literary Review: "[France] readily bridges the chasm between the two types of AIDS storyline to have emerged to date: the epidemiological one, which focuses on disease spread, populations, and political and institutional responses, and the biomedical one, which tells of individual bodily decline, death, grief and a legacy of loss." The Sunday Times wrote: "Powerful...This superbly written chronicle will stand as a towering work in its field, the best book on the pre-treatment years of the epidemic since Randy Shilts's And The Band Played On... Most of the people to whom it bears witness are not around to read it, but millions are alive today thanks to their efforts, and this moving record will ensure their legacy does not die with them."

Entertainment Weekly called it one of the 10 best nonfiction books of the 2010s, Literary Hub said it was one of the 20 best nonfiction works of the decade, and Slate named it one of the 50 best of the past 25 years.

== Awards and recognition, books ==
- The Baillie Gifford Prize
- The Green Carnation Prize
- The Stonewall Book Award (Israel Fishman Nonfiction Award); American Library Association
- The Lambda Literary Award
- Publishers' Triangle Best Nonfiction award
- The National Lesbian and Gay Journalists Association Book Prize
- Longlisted for the Andrew Carnegie Medal for Excellence, and shortlisted for the Wellcome Book Prize.

== Films ==
=== How to Survive a Plague ===
France's documentary film How to Survive a Plague, about the early years of the U.S. AIDS epidemic, was released in 2012, four years before his eponymous book. As director and producer, France made use of a wide range of archive footage from the height of the American AIDS crisis to create a feature documentary Esquire magazine called the Best Documentary of the year.

The film premiered at the Sundance Film Festival in 2012, won numerous festival awards worldwide, and was nominated for an Academy Award, a Directors Guild Award, an Independent Spirit Award, and two Emmys, and it won a Peabody Award a Gotham Award, and a GLAAD award. In addition, France received The John Schlesinger Award (given to a first time documentary or narrative feature filmmaker) from the Provincetown International Film Festival, the Jacqueline Donnet Emerging Documentary Filmmaker Award from the International Documentary Association, and the New York Film Critics Circle award for Best First Film, the group's first time to honor a documentary filmmaker.

=== The Death and Life of Marsha P. Johnson ===
In 2017, France released the documentary, The Death and Life of Marsha P. Johnson, which he directed. The film portrays the life of Marsha P. Johnson, a prominent activist in the late 1960s through the early 1990s, and follows the re-opened investigation into Johnson's suspicious death. It was acquired by Netflix in June 2017.

The film premiered in competition at the Tribeca Film Festival in April 2017, and debuted on Netflix on 6 October 2017. In October 2017, trans activist Tourmaline alleged David France used her work to create The Death and Life of Marsha P. Johnson. France denied the allegation and two independent investigations, published in Jezebel and The Advocate, found Gossett's/Tourmaline's allegations to be baseless. The film went on to win numerous festival awards and earn positive reviews—96% fresh on Rotten Tomatoes. In Vulture, the critic David Edelstein called the film "shattering;" Time Out New York called it "essential for anyone interested in learning how to make a loud-and-proud stink."

=== Welcome to Chechnya ===
France's 2020 film, Welcome to Chechnya, premiered at the 2020 Sundance Film Festival and was released on June 30, 2020, by HBO Films. It follows the work of activists rescuing survivors of torture in the anti-gay pogroms of Chechnya, and features footage that was shot in secret, using hidden cameras, cell phones, GoPros, and handycams. To protect the identities of asylum seekers, deepfake technology was used to replace the faces and voices of subjects with face and voice doubles in a way that allowed viewers to see real faces displaying real emotions.

"Chechnya" was shortlisted for an Oscar in the VFX category, a first for any documentary. Critics hailed the film as "an essential work of documentary," "astonishingly groundbreaking," and "easily one of the most searing and vital documentaries of the year. This masterful documentary from David France weaves high-stakes storytelling and investigative reporting to expose the ongoing situation, resulting in an unforgettable film."

"Welcome to Chechnya further establishes France as America's foremost documentarian on LGBTQ issues,” wrote Guy Lodge in Variety.

=== Queendom ===
David France was an Executive Producer of the acclaimed 2023 film Queendom.

=== Free Leonard Peltier ===
Together with Jesse Short Bull, France made the 2025 documentary Free Leonard Peltier.

== Awards and recognition, films ==
In film, David France has won more than 20 awards including the International Television and Seigenthaler Prize from RFK Human Rights, the George Foster Peabody Award, a Sundance Film Festival Special Jury Award for Editing, and a BAFTA.
