= Sylvia Rivera =

American LGBT rights activist (1951–2002)

- Rivera, in the "gay camp" at the Christopher Street Piers c. 2000
- Born: July 2, 1951; New York City, U.S.
- Died: February 19, 2002 (aged 50); New York City, U.S.
- Occupations: Activist, caterer, drag queen
- Known for: Gay liberation, transgender activist, advocate for the homeless.

Sylvia Rivera (July 2, 1951 – February 19, 2002) was an American gay liberation and transgender rights activist who was also a noted community worker in New York. Rivera, who identified as a drag queen for most of her life and later as a transgender person, participated in demonstrations with the Gay Liberation Front.

With close friend Marsha P. Johnson, Rivera co-founded the Street Transvestite Action Revolutionaries (STAR), a group dedicated to helping homeless young drag queens, gay youth, and trans women.

== Early life ==
Rivera was born and raised in New York City and lived most of her life in or near the city; she was born to a Puerto Rican father and a Venezuelan mother. She was abandoned by her birth father José Rivera early in life, and became an orphan after her mother died by suicide when Rivera was three years old. Rivera was then raised by her Venezuelan grandmother, who disapproved of Rivera's effeminate behavior, particularly after Rivera began to wear makeup in fourth grade.

As a result, in 1962, Rivera left home at ten years old and began living on the streets of New York. Like many other homeless youth in the community, she engaged in survival sex as a child prostitute. She was taken in by the local drag queens, including Marsha P. Johnson, who became Rivera's best friend and protector. In this tightly knit community of drag queens and street hustlers "who hung out on 42nd Street", she was christened with her new name by "an old butch dyke and an old queen (the godfather and godmother of 42nd)" who chose the name for her.

== Early activism ==
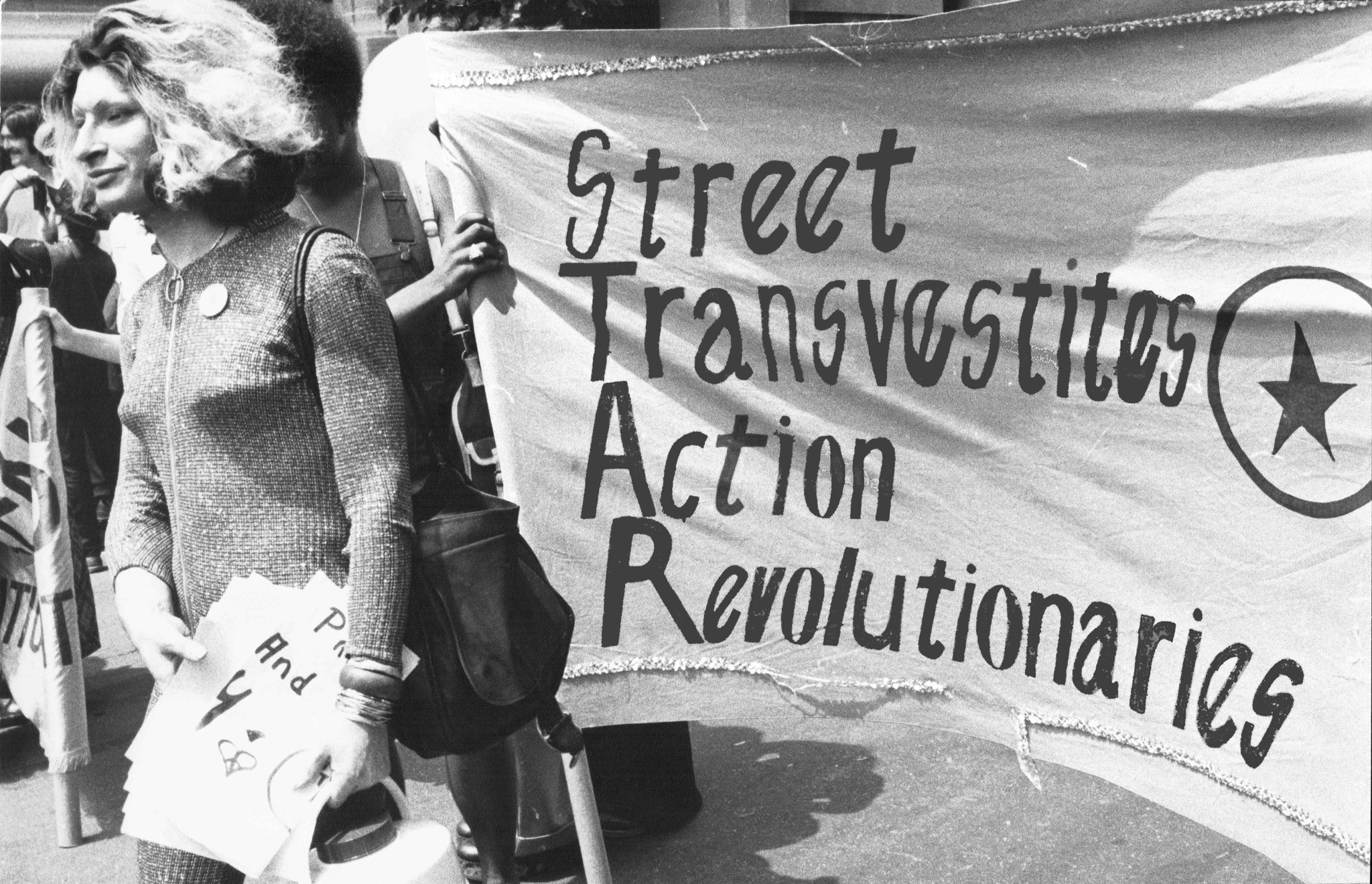
Sylvia Rivera with STAR banner

Rivera's activism began in 1970 after she participated in actions with the Gay Liberation Front's Drag Queen Caucus and later joined the Gay Activists Alliance at 18 years old, where she fought for not only the rights of gay people, but also for the inclusion of drag queens like herself in the movement. Rivera sometimes exaggerated her importance, purporting to have been active during the civil rights movement, the movement against the Vietnam war, second-wave feminist movements, as well as Puerto Rican and African American youth activism, particularly with the Young Lords and the Black Panthers, but she could not prove her claims.

Rivera's older friend Marsha P. Johnson had been Rivera's protector and friend since Rivera arrived in the city, and the two were close friends from 1963 through 1973. In 1970, Rivera and Johnson co-founded Street Transvestite Action Revolutionaries (STAR). STAR offered services and advocacy for homeless queer youth, and fought for the Sexual Orientation Non-Discrimination Act in New York. SONDA prohibits discrimination on the basis of sexual orientation in employment, housing, public accommodations, education, credit, and the exercise of civil rights.

== Stonewall riots and move to Tarrytown ==
While Johnson freely admitted to not being the one to start the Stonewall riots, Johnson is one of the few people who multiple, independent witnesses all agree was instrumental in the week of rioting and "known to have been in the vanguard" of the pushback against police once the rioting peaked late the first night. After Johnson was being praised for being involved in the Stonewall uprising, Rivera began claiming that she (Rivera) was also instrumental in the riots, even going so far as to have claimed to have started the riots herself. Stonewall historian David Carter, however, questioned Rivera's claims of even being at the riots, based on contradictory statements that Rivera made, and on testimony relayed to him by early gay rights activists, such as Marsha P. Johnson, who denied in multiple interviews that Rivera had been there.

When the Stonewall riots occurred, Rivera was only 17 years old, and according to Bob Kohler, who was there on the first two nights of the riots, Rivera "always hung out uptown at Bryant Park" and never came downtown. In 1987, Marsha P. Johnson told gay rights historian Eric Marcus that in the hours prior to Johnson arriving downtown to join the riots, Johnson had attended a party uptown and that "Sylvia Rivera and them were over in [Bryant] park having a cocktail." There are several other statements Johnson made to highly credible witnesses — namely, Randy Wicker, Bob Kohler, and Doric Wilson, all with deep and enduring ties to the LGBTQ rights movement — about Rivera not having been at the Uprising.

Kohler told Carter that although Rivera had not been at the uprising, he hoped that Carter would still portray her as having been there. Another Stonewall veteran, Thomas Lanigan-Schmidt, claimed that he wanted to add her "so that young Puerto Rican transgender people on the street would have a role model." When Kohler and Rivera had a discussion over whether Kohler would back Rivera's claims to Carter for the book, Rivera asked Kohler to say that Rivera threw a Molotov cocktail. Kohler responded, "Sylvia, you didn't throw a Molotov cocktail!" Rivera continued to bargain with him, asking if he'd say she threw the first brick. He replied, "Sylvia, you didn't throw a brick." The first bottle? He still refused. Finally Kohler agreed to lie and say Rivera had been there and had at some point thrown a bottle.

Randy Wicker, who was part of the Mattachine Society and a witness to the riots, said that Marsha Johnson had told him that Sylvia had not been at Stonewall "as she was asleep after taking heroin uptown". At the 1973 Christopher Street Liberation Day Rally in New York City, which was the four-year anniversary of the Stonewall riots, Rivera gave her famous "Gay Power!" speech. Rivera and fellow queen Lee Brewster jumped onstage during feminist activist Jean O'Leary's speech, which was critical in tone towards drag queens, and shouted in reply, "Y'all Better Quiet Down! You go to bars because of what drag queens did for you, and these bitches tell us to quit being ourselves!"(O'Leary later regretted her words and stance.) During this speech from the main stage, Rivera, representing STAR, called out the heterosexual males who were preying on vulnerable members of the community. Rivera espoused what could be seen as a third gender perspective, saying that LGBT prisoners seeking help "do not write women. They do not write men. They write to STAR." After the speech, Rivera was backstage talking to people about having been at the Stonewall uprising. Doric Wilson recalls that Marsha P. Johnson said to Rivera, “You know you weren't there.”

After Marsha Johnson confronted Rivera about lying about Stonewall at the 1973 rally, Rivera left Manhattan in the mid-1970s, relocating to Tarrytown, New York. In these years Rivera lived with her lover and together they ran a catering business. In the documentary The Death and Life of Marsha P. Johnson, Rivera shares footage of the drag shows she hosted at the Music Hall in Tarrytown during this time.

== Return to NYC ==
In early July 1992, shortly after the New York City Pride March, Marsha P. Johnson's body was found floating in the Hudson River off the West Village Piers. Police promptly ruled Johnson's death a suicide, despite the presence of a head wound and multiple witness reports that described her being followed by men the night before her death. Johnson's friends and supporters, Rivera included, insisted Johnson had not been suicidal, and a people's postering campaign later declared that Johnson had earlier been harassed near the spot where Johnson's body was found.

After receiving a telegram with the notification of her friend's death, Rivera returned to the city. Homeless now, she took up residence on the "Gay Piers" at the end of Christopher Street, and became an advocate for homeless members of the gay community. While living at the Christopher Street Piers, she faced frequent battles with law enforcement, who eventually forced her to leave the area.

In May 1995, Rivera tried to end her life by walking into the Hudson River. That year she also appeared in the Arthur Dong documentary episode "Out Rage '69", part of the PBS series The Question of Equality, which featured the 1973 footage of her "Gay Power" speech at Pride and gave an extensive interview to gay journalist Randy Wicker in which she discussed her suicide attempts, Johnson's life and death, and her advocacy for poor and working-class gay people made homeless by the AIDS crisis.

At various times in her life, Rivera battled substance abuse and lived on the streets, largely in the gay homeless community at the Christopher Street docks. Her experiences made her more focused on advocacy for those who, in her view, were left behind by the mainstream society and the assimilationist sectors of the gay community. Rivera fought partly for herself for those reasons but most importantly for the rights of people of color and low-income LGBT people. As someone who suffered from systemic poverty and racism, she used her voice for unity, sharing her stories, pain, and struggles to show her community they are not alone. She amplified the voices of the most vulnerable members of the gay community: drag queens, homeless youth, gay inmates in prison and jail, and transgender people.

In the last five years of her life, Rivera gave a number of speeches about the Stonewall Uprising and the necessity for all transgender people (which Rivera, in this early definition, defined as including drag queens and butch dykes) to fight for their legacy at the forefront of the LGBT movement. She became heavily involved in the AIDS Coalition to Unleash Power (ACT UP) organization in the 1990's during the height of the AIDS crisis in New York City, and participated in community service opportunities with the organization. She traveled to Italy for the Millennium March in 2000, where she was acclaimed as the "mother of all gay people". In early 2001, after a service at the Metropolitan Community Church of New York referring to the Star of Bethlehem announcing the birth of Jesus, she decided to resurrect STAR as an active political organization (now changing "Transvestite" to the more recently coined term "Transgender," which at that time was understood to include all gender-nonconforming people).

STAR fought for the New York City Transgender Rights Bill and for a trans-inclusive New York State Sexual Orientation Non Discrimination Act. STAR also sponsored street pressures for justice for Amanda Milan, a transgender woman murdered in 2000. Rivera attacked Human Rights Campaign and Empire State Pride Agenda as organizations that were standing in the way of transgender rights. On her deathbed she met with Matt Foreman and Joe Grabarz of ESPA to negotiate transgender inclusion in its political structure and agenda.

Rivera was angered that in the late 1990s and early 2000s she perceived the significance of drag queens and drag culture being minimized by the ostensibly assimilationist gay rights agenda, particularly by new would-be "gay leaders" who were focusing on military service (Don't Ask Don't Tell) and marriage equality. Rivera's conflicts with these newer, more mainstream, LGBT groups were emblematic of the mainstream LGBT movement's strained relationship to the radical politics of many earlier gay liberation activists. After Rivera's death, Michael Bronski recalled her anger when she felt that she was being marginalized within the community, in "Hell hath no fury like a drag queen scorned":

After Gay Liberation Front folded and the more reformist Gay Activists Alliance (GAA) became New York's primary gay rights group, Sylvia Rivera worked hard within their ranks in 1971 to promote a citywide gay rights, anti-discrimination ordinance. But for all of her work, when it came time to make deals, GAA dropped the portions in the civil rights bill that dealt with transvestitism and drag — it just wasn't possible to pass it with such "extreme" elements included. As it turned out, it wasn't possible to pass the bill anyway until 1986. But not only was the language of the bill changed, GAA — which was becoming increasingly more conservative, several of its founders and officers had plans to run for public office — even changed its political agenda to exclude issues of transvestitism and drag. It was also not unusual for Sylvia to be urged to "front" possibly dangerous demonstrations, but when the press showed up, she would be pushed aside by the more middle-class, "straight-appearing" leadership. In 1995, Rivera was still hurt: "When things started getting more mainstream, it was like, 'We don't need you no more'". But, she added, "Hell hath no fury like a drag queen scorned".

According to Bronski, Rivera was banned from New York's Gay & Lesbian Community Center for several years in the mid-1990s, because, on a cold winter's night, she aggressively demanded that the Center take care of poor and homeless queer youth. A short time before her death, Bronski reports that she said:

One of our main goals now is to destroy the Human Rights Campaign, because I'm tired of sitting on the back of the bumper. It's not even the back of the bus anymore — it's the back of the bumper. The bitch on wheels is back.

Rivera's struggles did not relate exclusively to gay and trans people, as they intersected with issues of poverty and discrimination faced by people of color, which caused friction in the GAA as it was mainly made up of white middle-class gay people. The transgender person-of-color activist and scholar Jessi Gan discusses how mainstream LGBT groups have routinely dismissed or not paid sufficient attention to Rivera's Latina identity, while Puerto Rican and Latino groups have often not fully acknowledged Rivera's contribution to their struggles for civil rights. Tim Retzloff has discussed this issue with respect to the omission of discussions about race and ethnicity in mainstream U.S. LGBT history, particularly with regard to Rivera's legacy.

== Gender and sexual identity ==
Rivera's gender identity was complex and varied throughout her life. In 1971, she spoke of herself as a "half sister". In her essay "Transvestites: Your Half Sisters and Half Brothers of the Revolution", she specifically claims her use of transvestite as applying to only the queer community: "Transvestites are homosexual men and women who dress in clothes of the opposite sex. Male transvestites dress and live as women. Half sisters like myself are women with the minds of women trapped in male bodies."

In interviews and writings in her later years, notably her 1995 interview with Randy Wicker and her 2002 essay, "Queens In Exile, The Forgotten Ones," she expressed a fluid take on gender and sexuality, referring to herself alternately as a gay man, a "gay girl", and a drag queen/street queen, embodying all of these experiences and seeing none of these identities as excluding the others. About her experiences and identity, she says:

I left home at age 10 in 1961. I hustled on 42nd Street. The early 60s was not a good time for drag queens, effeminate boys or boys that wore makeup like we did. Back then we were beat up by the police, by everybody. I didn't really come out as a drag queen until the late 60s when drag queens were arrested, what degradation there was. I remember the first time I got arrested, I wasn't even in full drag. I was walking down the street and the cops just snatched me. People now want to call me a lesbian because I'm with Julia, (Note: Julia Murray, Rivera's partner in the last years of her life) and I say, "No. I'm just me. I'm not a lesbian." I'm tired of being labeled. I don't even like the label transgender. I'm tired of living with labels. I just want to be who I am. I am Sylvia Rivera. Ray Rivera left home at the age of 10 to become Sylvia. And that's who I am.

As a woman who had relationships with men and with women, she has also been described as bisexual.

Rivera further writes of having considered gender-affirming surgery much earlier in life, but of ultimately choosing to reject it, taking hormone therapy only near the end of her life.

== Death ==
On the day of her death, while bedridden and in declining health, Rivera met with Empire State Pride Agenda delegates to advocate for trans rights in the pending SONDA bill, which they had been excluded from. Rivera died during the dawn hours of February 19, 2002, at St. Vincent's Hospital, of complications from liver cancer. Activist Riki Wilchins said, "In many ways, Sylvia was the Rosa Parks of the modern transgender movement".

== Legacy ==
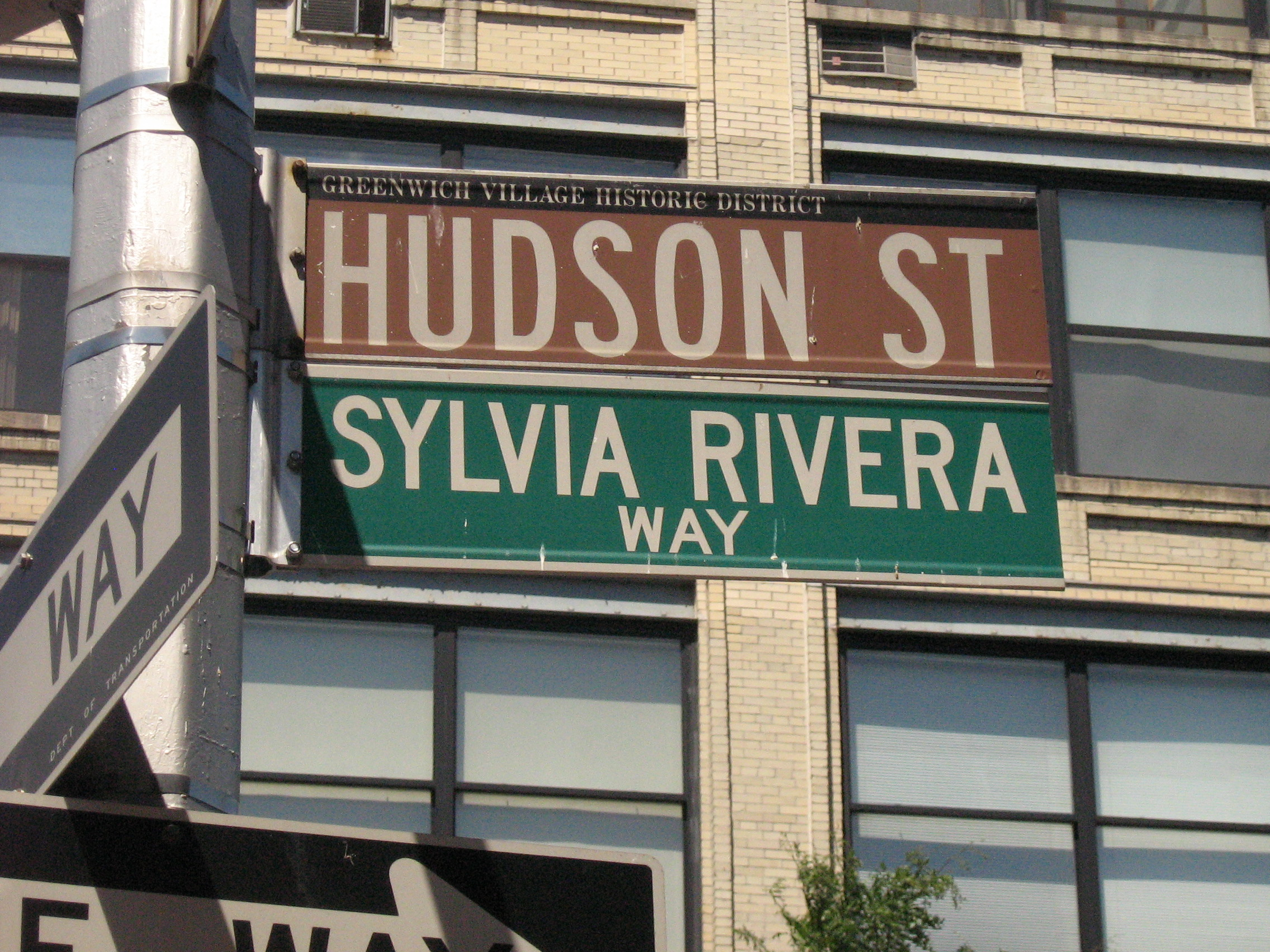
Street sign in New York City's Greenwich Village, named in Rivera's honor

As an active member of the Metropolitan Community Church of New York, Rivera ministered through the Church's food pantry, which provides food to hungry people. As well, recalling her life as a child on the streets, she remained a passionate advocate for queer youth. MCC New York has a food pantry called the Sylvia Rivera Food Pantry, and its queer youth shelter is called Sylvia's Place, both in her honor.

Season 1, episode 1 and Season 3, episode 1 of the podcast Making Gay History are about her.

Founded by attorney and activist Dean Spade in 2002, and named in her honor, the Sylvia Rivera Law Project (SRLP) is dedicated "to guarantee that all people are free to self-determine gender identity and expression, regardless of income or race, and without facing harassment, discrimination or violence". Although Rivera was not personally tied with SRLP, the organizations values are closely aligned and embodies her lifelong commitment to ensuring that transgender, gender non-conforming, and intersex people, specifically those pertaining to communities of color who are at the face of poverty, housing insecurity, and the criminal justice system have free access to legal resources and advocacy while trying to combat systematic oppression.

In 2002, actor/comedian Jade Esteban Estrada portrayed Rivera in the well-received solo musical ICONS: The Lesbian and Gay History of the World, Vol. 1 (directed by Aliza Washabaugh-Durand and produced by Aliza Washabaugh-Durand and Christopher Durand) winning Rivera renewed national attention.

In 2005, the corner of Christopher and Hudson streets was renamed "Sylvia Rivera Way" in her honor. This intersection is in Greenwich Village, the neighborhood in New York City where Rivera started organizing, and is only two blocks from the Stonewall Inn.

In January 2007, a new musical based upon Rivera's life, Sylvia So Far, premiered in New York at La Mama in a production starring Bianca Leigh as Rivera and Peter Proctor as Marsha P. Johnson. The composer and lyricist is Timothy Mathis (Wallflowers, Our Story Too, The Conjuring), a friend of Rivera's in real life. The show moved off-Broadway in the winter of 2007/2008.

The Spring 2007 issue of CENTRO: Journal of the Center for Puerto Rican Studies, which was dedicated to "Puerto Rican Queer Sexualities" and published at Hunter College, included a special dossier on Rivera, including a transcription of a talk by Rivera from 2001 as well as two academic essays exploring the intersections of Rivera's trans and Latina identities. The articles in this journal issue complement other essays by Puerto Rican scholars who have also emphasized Rivera's pioneering role.

In 2014, The Social Justice Hub at The New School’s newly opened University Center was named the Baldwin Rivera Boggs Center after activists James Baldwin, Sylvia Rivera, and Grace Lee Boggs.

In 2015, a portrait of Rivera was added to the National Portrait Gallery, making Rivera the first transgender activist to be featured in the gallery.

In 2016, Rivera was inducted into the Legacy Walk.

In 2018, Happy Birthday, Marsha! a short film about Rivera and Marsha P. Johnson, set in the hours before the 1969 Stonewall riots in New York City, was released.

A large, painted mural depicting Rivera and Marsha P. Johnson went on display in Dallas, Texas, in 2019 to commemorate the 50th anniversary of the Stonewall riots. The painting of the "two pioneers of the gay rights movement" in front of a transgender flag claims to be the world's largest mural honoring the trans community.

In May 2019, it was announced that LGBT rights activists Marsha P. Johnson and Sylvia Rivera would be commemorated with a monument in New York's Greenwich Village, near the epicenter of the historic Stonewall riots. The monument was publicly announced on May 30, in honor of the 50th anniversary of Stonewall and just in time for Pride month. Unfortunately, the construction of the monument was halted in 2020 as a result of the COVID-19 pandemic, but Mayor Adams of New York City announced in 2024 that the project would be revived at a future date.

In June 2019, the Italian city of Livorno dedicated a green area to Rivera, called Parco Sylvia Rivera.

In June 2019, Rivera was one of the inaugural fifty American "pioneers, trailblazers, and heroes" inducted on the National LGBTQ Wall of Honor within the Stonewall National Monument (SNM) in New York City’s Stonewall Inn. The SNM is the first U.S. national monument dedicated to LGBTQ rights and history, and the wall's unveiling was timed to take place during the 50th anniversary of the Stonewall riots.

== See also ==
- Drag culture in New York City
- LGBTQ culture in New York City
- List of LGBTQ people from New York City
- List of Puerto Ricans
- Nuyorican
- NYC Drag March
- NYC Pride March
- Puerto Ricans in New York City
- Stormé DeLarverie
- Christina Hayworth
- Transgender culture of New York City
