= CARE UK =

CARE UK may refer to

- The UK branch of the relief agency CARE International
- Care UK, a UK provider of residential health and social care for older people
- Christian Action Research and Education, a UK pressure group
