= UK Gay Liberation Front 1971 Festival of Light action =

LGBTQ+ rights protest against religious conservatism in 1971 in London

- Part of Gay liberation movement
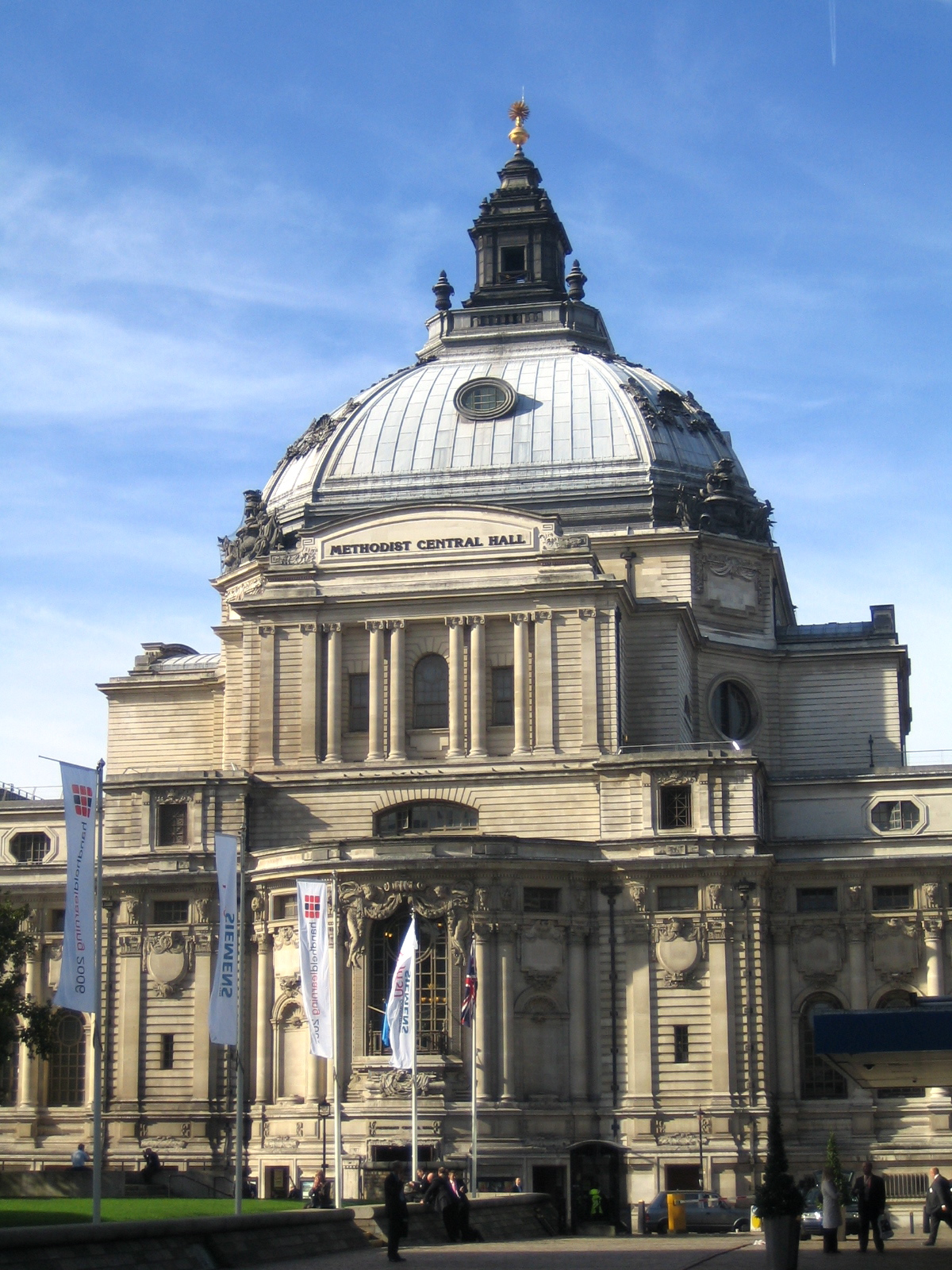
- Methodist Central Hall, Westminster
- Date: 9 September 1971
- Location: Methodist Central Hall, Westminster; 51°30′00″N 0°07′48″W

Parties
Nationwide Festival of Light	Gay Liberation Front

Lead figures
Mary Whitehouse; Malcolm Muggeridge; Lord Longford; Cliff Richard	Bob Mellors; Peter Tatchell

On 9 September 1971 the UK Gay Liberation Front (GLF) undertook an action to disrupt the launch of the Church-based morality campaign Nationwide Festival of Light at the Methodist Central Hall, Westminster. A number of well-known British figures were involved in the disrupted rally, and the action involved the use of "radical drag" drawing on the Stonewall riots and subsequent GLF actions in the US. Peter Tatchell, gay human rights campaigner, was involved in the action which was one of a series which influenced the development of gay activism in the UK, received media attention at the time, and is still discussed by some of those involved.

== Background ==
The Gay Liberation Front in the UK was formed in 1970 in response to the formation of the GLF in the US, which was established after the Stonewall riots in 1969. Prior to the formation of GLF in the UK, the Campaign for Homosexual Equality (CHE) had been the primary focus for the campaign for gay rights; CHE focused on lobbying government for specific legal reforms, while GLF campaigned for systemic changes in society that would lead to wider acceptance of lesbian and gay people. GLF existed for four years in the UK, and this action was one of the best known and controversial actions they undertook, one which featured in the national news at the time. Public figures involved at the time still describe their experience today. This was period when lesbian and gay people were shifting from an approach that was apologetic to one of pride. In 1971 the UK GLF published its Manifesto and held a series of high-profile direct actions, including the one at the Festival of Light.

The Festival of Light included several notable people of that time, such as Cliff Richard, Mary Whitehouse, Malcolm Muggeridge and Lord Longford. It was an organisation which lobbied the UK Government and held public rallies to show support for their lobbying. Muggeridge and Whitehouse identified certain liberalisations in law, and public acceptance of certain phenomena, as moral evil; examples are extra-marital sex, pornography in films, sex on TV, legalisation of abortion, and openly-gay individuals.

== Activism as theatre ==
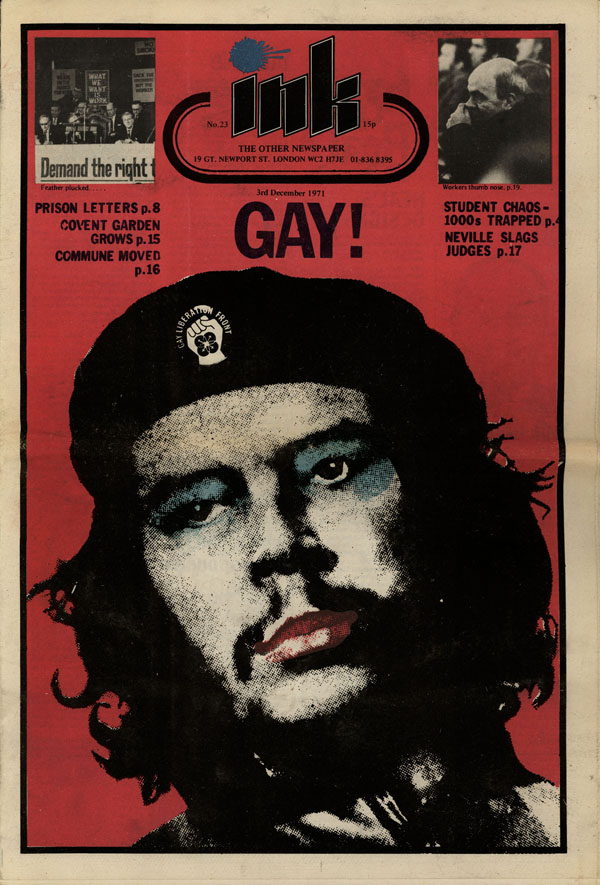
Ink: Gay Liberation Front cover, London, 1971

Drawing on the gay tradition of camp, GLF developed a new style of political campaigning, "protest as performance", where the claim for human rights was projected through creativity, using imagination, daring and wit, rather than marches and rallies. These actions were called "zaps", intended to reduce the rallies to a farcical shambles. The Festival of Light was the most notable of these. One of those who embraced this style of activism was Bette Bourne, the message of gay liberation being couched in comedy, song, tap routines and make-up. "We were finding a new way of doing drag that wasn't offensive to women, that wasn't about false tits and distasteful jokes. We saw ourselves as a new type of man. We could wear frocks and make-up and be silly and funny, but we had a serious message, too." This began a tradition of drag continued through the work of performers like David Hoyle down, a style of drag, separate from the aggressive form of "female impersonation". Another figure who was involved in the disruption was Martin Corbett, who walked into the basement of Westminster Central Hall, ordered the staff to leave with an assumed authority, and plunged the Festival into darkness by disconnecting the electrical and broadcasting cables.

Peter Tatchell described the Festival of Light as being against the "moral darkness" of "pornography, homosexuality and abortion." The GLF counter-protest was code-named "Operation Rupert' after the subversive 'Rupert Bear' cartoon in OZ magazine. He attended the Festival action as part of the GLF Youth Group. "When Malcolm Muggeridge, speaking out about homosexuals, declared: 'I don't like them.' The feeling was mutual," the group he was part of staged a "kiss-in" in the upper balcony of the hall. "Mice were released into the audience; lesbian couples stood up and passionately embraced. A dozen GLF nuns in immaculate blue and white habits charged the platform shouting gay liberation slogans, and a GLF bishop began preaching an impromptu sermon which urged people to 'keep on sinning.'"

== Radical Drag ==
The theme known as "radical drag" was a central element to the Festival of Light and subsequent GLF actions. In response to ideas about the 'wrong-sex', gay people distanced themselves from stereotypes of effeminate gay men and butch lesbians, in a way in which gay people were supposed to appear like anybody else. Within the Gay Liberation Movement there was also a deeper questioning of the validity of gender roles. The philosophy underlying radical drag rejected the concepts of masculinity and femininity, which correlated to ideas of dominance and submission. The idea of men who are really women, or of 'real men' dissolves in this deconstruction. In dissociating from the stigma of effeminacy in order to gain acceptance in heterosexual society, gay men tacitly supported the rigidity of gender roles, a definition of men from which they were excluded because of their sexuality. Gay men were complicit in the oppression of the effeminate gay men who adopted that stereotype, often denouncing the camp queens and diesel dykes who had 'come out' and born the brunt of homophobia before those who were more discreet themselves felt comfortable enough to come out. In 1974, to counteract this, the GLF stated that it had developed "a strong section of opinion which claims that the only way for gay people to come out that will make any real impact on the gender role definitions which underlie gay oppression is by adopting a life-style and appearance that explicitly reject the masculine/feminine distinction and all that it implies."

== Subsequent campaigns and other actions ==
The work of GLF in this and other actions and demonstrations helped inspire more people towards open activism. Following the style of campaign and public demonstration, CHE changed its own style of campaigning, and interest in GLF waned. After the demise of GLF, Peter Tatchell went on to form OutRage!, which still performs strategic actions in which individuals, organisations and countries identified as homophobic are openly confronted in provocative ways, such as at the 2009 Eurovision Song Contest.

Other actions and acts of civil disobedience confronting discrimination and homophobia at the time included a picket at Pan Books in protest at the publication of a book by David Reuben, which claimed that gay men were obsessed with the anal insertion of vegetables, freedom rides and sit-ins at pubs that refused to serve 'poofs' and 'dykes', the occupation of Coutts Bank because of their holding the Maudsley Hospital account (where aversion therapy was still being practiced in the early 1970s) and the confrontation of Professor Hans Eysenck during a lecture in which he advocated electric-shock and aversion therapy to "cure" homosexuality. Tatchell talks of this time, "As well as being politics with fun, this activism helped banish our internalised shame, repairing much of the damage that homophobia had done to us. Through GLF, we became happier, more confident queers, unafraid to challenge even the most powerful homophobes."

== See also ==
- Gay liberation
- Socialism and LGBT rights
- Gay Activists Alliance
- USA GLF: N. A. Diaman, Brenda Howard, Sylvia Rivera
- London GLF: Bob Mellors, Peter Tatchell
- Hall–Carpenter Archives
- List of LGBT rights organizations
- Nationwide Festival of Light

== References and further reading ==
- Material relating to the Festival of Light, [1971–1975], mainly concerning the disinformation campaign by the GLF, is held at the Hall–Carpenter Archives.
- "Today in London religious history, 1971: the Gay Liberation Front mash up reactionary christian Festival of Light". Past Tense: London radical histories and possibilities. 9 September 2019.
- Power, Lisa (1995). No Bath But Plenty of Bubbles: An Oral History of the Gay Liberation Front, 1970–1973. Cassell. ISBN 978-0-304-33195-6.
- Whipple, Amy C. (13 July 2010). "Speaking for Whom? The 1971 Festival of Light and the Search for the 'Silent Majority'". Contemporary British History. 24 (3): 319–339. doi:10.1080/13619462.2010.497254. S2CID 144839277.
