= Bob Mellors =

British gay rights activist

- Born: 28 October 1949
- Died: 24 March 1996 (aged 46); Warsaw, Poland
- Occupations: Writer, gay rights activist

Bob Mellors (28 October 1949 – 24 March 1996) was a British gay rights activist.

== Biography ==
In 1970 Mellors went to New York and became involved with the Gay Liberation Front (GLF) becoming friends with Aubrey Walter during demos outside the Women's House of Correction in New York. Meeting up with the Black Panthers helped to crystallize their ideas on gay liberation and they decided to create a London version of the GLF.

As Mellors was working in the London School of Economics (LSE) he booked the room for the first meeting of the London GLF in the Clare Market building owned by the LSE, on 13 October 1970. Also taking part in that meeting were David Fernbach] (author and Aubrey's partner), Richard Dipple (involved in the Albany Trust), Bill Halstead (LSE student) and Bev Jackson (later running for college office with the slogan "Bev the Lez for Prez"), Tom Gowling (language student at Central School London) & Fernley Thompson (architecture student at NE London Poly)

A tiny spark can cause a prairie fire.

— Bob Mellors, unveiling a plaque at the London School of Economics for the 20th anniversary of the founding of the Gay Liberation Front

During the 1970s Mellors came to know Charlotte Bach, a writer and teacher. Charlotte left Bob her library and Bob wrote her biography but never had it published.

When the British GLF faltered in 1974 Bob Mellors helped in the formation of more specialized lesbian and gay community groups.

Mellors never made any money from his writing and in London survived by art school modelling and working in the box office of the Electric and other cinemas.

In 1991 Mellors moved to Warsaw "for the company of Polish youth". He taught English to Polish telecommunications staff. He was preparing an article on young Polish sexual identity for the gay journal Perversions just before his death.

Mellors was found stabbed to death at his home in Warsaw on 24 March 1996. This was the result of a burglary at his flat. He is buried in Nottinghamshire.

== See also ==
- Hall-Carpenter archives

== Bibliography ==
- Mellors, Bob (1978). "Clint Eastwood loves Jeff Bridges, true! : "homosexuality", androgyny & evolution : a simple introduction". Quantum Jump Publications: Another-Orbit Press. OCLC 16477157. Archived from the original (pamphlet) on 15 May 2003.
- Mellors, Bob (1980). "We Are All Androgynous Yellow". Another-Orbit Press. OCLC 16605861. Archived from the original on 15 May 2003.
- Bach, Charlotte M.; Mellors, Bob (c. 1985). "An outline of human ethology". Another-Orbit Press. OCLC 33346846. Archived from the original (4 volumes) on 15 May 2003.
