= CareConfidential =

UK charity

CareConfidential is a charity which provides information and counselling independent of the NHS on pregnancy choices, and post-abortion support. They do this through their website, helpline and online chat. Information on their website and leaflets has been certified by the information Standard. They formerly supported a network of crisis pregnancy centers, but as of 2014, no longer do so. CareConfidential was founded as a programme of the anti-abortion organisation Christian Action Research and Education (CARE), and became an independent charity in 2011. Since becoming independent CareConfidential do not explicitly state whether they are support or oppose abortion rights but seek to acknowledge the freedom of choice, respecting all clients' decisions.

Investigations by BBC Newsnight and by the pro-choice charity Education for Choice found that false medical information about the supposed physical and mental health risks of abortion was given during counselling at some centres affiliated with CareConfidential and that the counselling was not impartial, with counsellors pushing women to carry their pregnancies to term. Other centres were impartial, offering clients the time, space and accurate information to talk though their choices.
