= Hall–Carpenter Archives =

LGBT archive in Britain

Hall-Carpenter Archives logo

The Hall–Carpenter Archives (HCA), founded in 1982, are the largest source for the study of gay activism in Britain, following the publication of the Wolfenden Report in 1957. The archives are named after the authors Marguerite Radclyffe Hall (1880–1943) and Edward Carpenter (1844–1929). They are housed at the London School of Economics, at Bishopsgate Library – (press cuttings), and in the British Library (Sound Archive) (oral history tapes).

== Projects ==
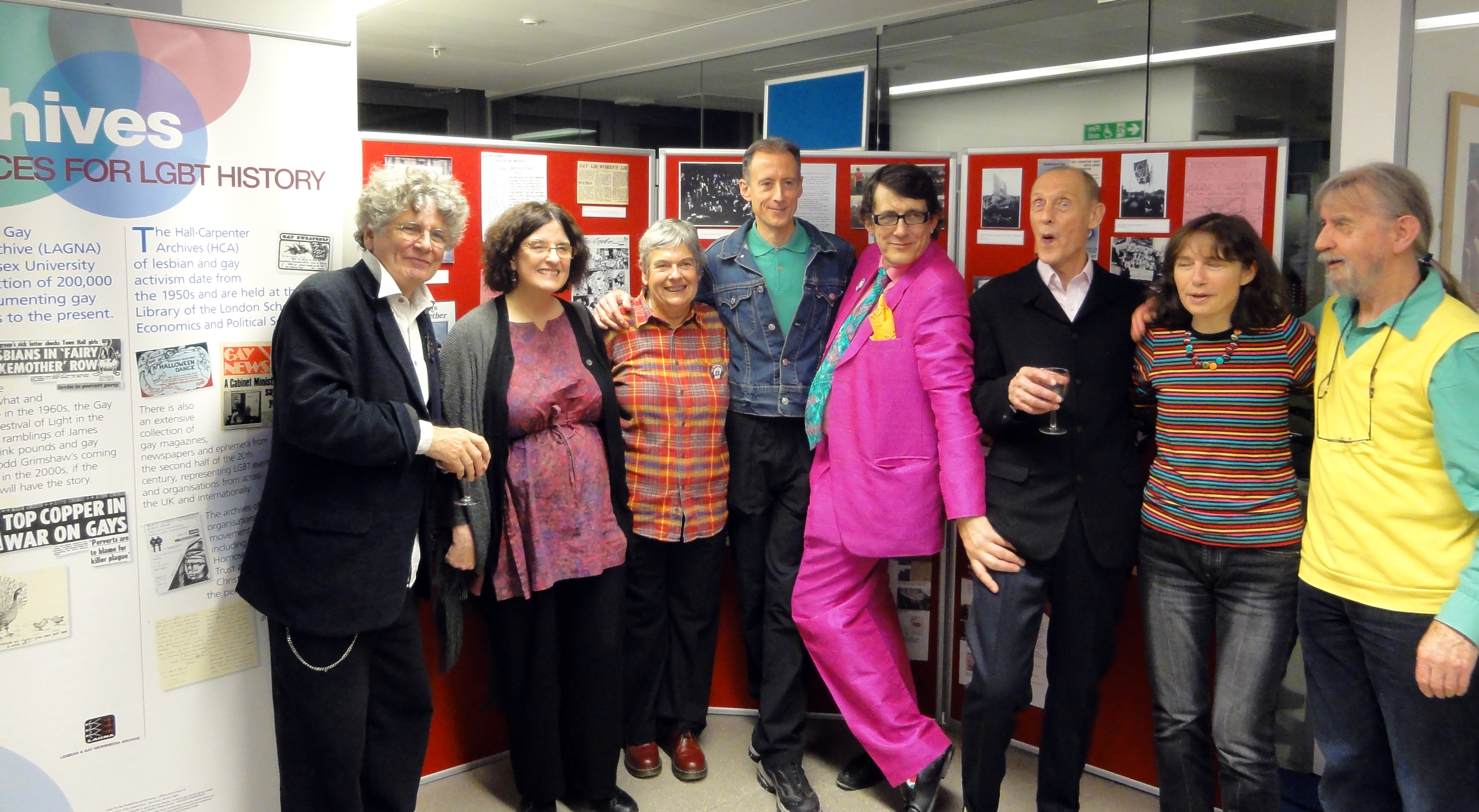
HCA exhibition with original GLF activists at a 40th anniversary celebration at the LSE.

These projects in partnership with the Lesbian and Gay Newsmedia Archive.

- 1967 and All That; The Sexual Offences Act and the Gay Community

- To produce a touring exhibition throughout 2007 to raise awareness of gay history and the significance of the 1967 Act.
- Provide access to previously inaccessible historical material by cataloguing archives of the Homosexual Law Reform Society, the Albany Trust, the Campaign for Homosexual Equality, plus the papers of Peter Tatchell and Bob Mellors.
- Research at the British Library Newspaper Collection to identify newspaper articles in the British press in the period leading up to the 1967 Sexual Offences Act, and beyond.
- Run a programme of outreach work to include illustrated talks on the 1967 and All That project across the London boroughs and to interested community groups.

- Queer Britain 1953–1988; The Gay Community and the Straight Press

- Outreach and cataloguing project completed 2005

== History of the archives ==
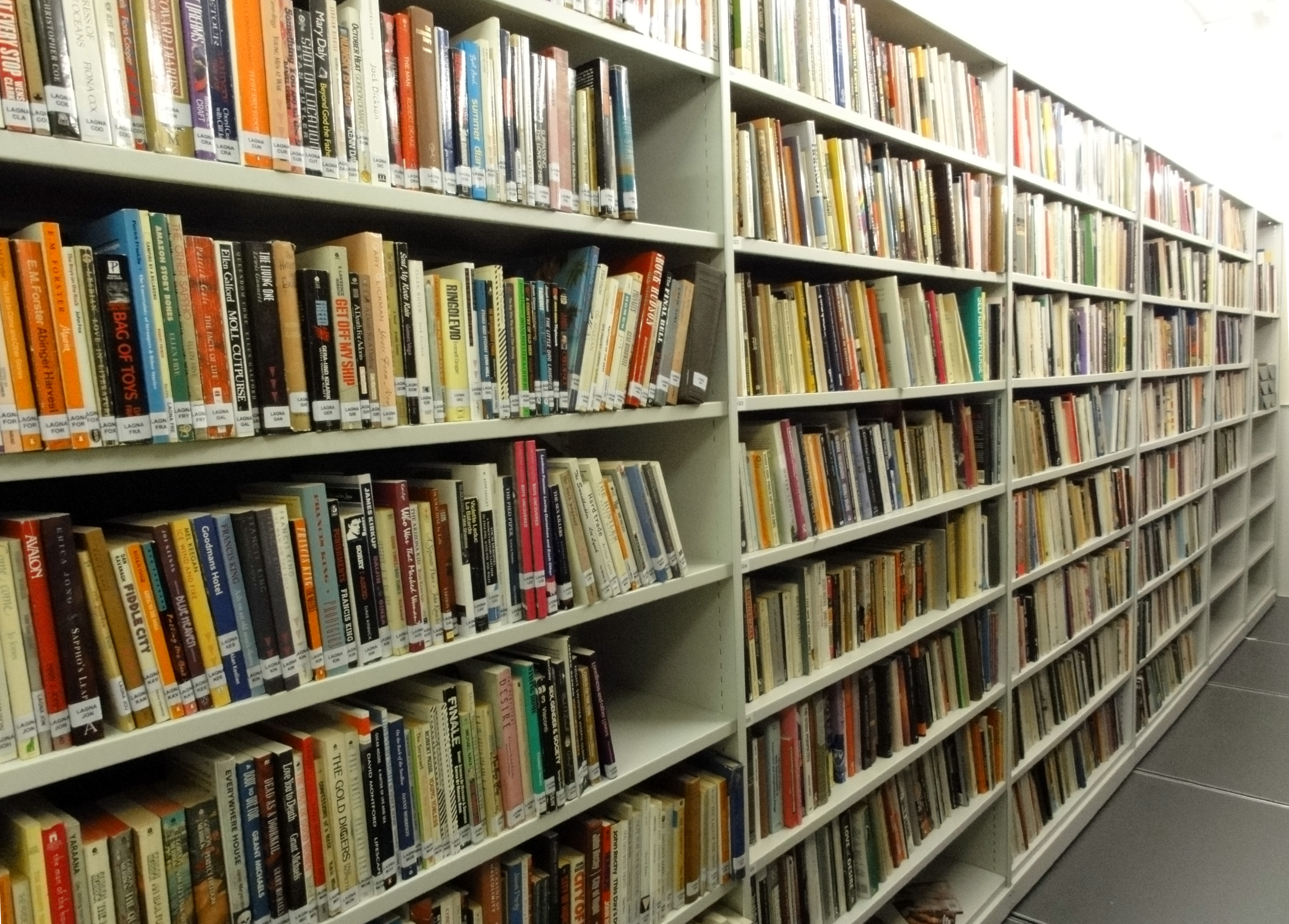
Part of the HCA book collection held at the Bishopsgate Institute library.

=== 1980 ===
The Campaign for Homosexual Equality (CHE) established the Gay Monitoring & Archive Project (GMAP) to collect evidence of discrimination and police arrests from all parts of the United Kingdom. It received agency press cuttings and collected other newspaper clippings sent in by its members.

GMAP later became separate from CHE and one its founders, Julian Meldrum, moved all the papers into his London flat. Its first funding was a grant made to the National Council for Civil Liberties (NCCL) from the Manpower Services Commission.

=== 1982 ===
Julian, with others, set up a limited company called the Hall–Carpenter Memorial Archives Ltd and in 1983 registered as a charity. Trustees included Oliver Merrington (Chair of the archive) and Michael Mason, publisher of Capital Gay. The Albany Trust, donated its archives and press cuttings, and the NCCL provided essential meeting and working space in Southwark, with financial assistance from the Lyndhurst Settlement. It also received personal donations from members of the lesbian and gay community.

=== 1984 ===
The archives moved to its first rented office accommodation in Mount Pleasant, London.

A major funding bid resulted in a grant of £32,000 from the Greater London Council (GLC). Part of this was to set up a Media Project to monitor television and radio broadcasts, and Lorraine Trenchard and Mark Finch were employed to run this. The archives moved to the new London Lesbian & Gay Centre (LLGC) in Cowcross Street, Farringdon (at that time the largest lesbian & gay centre in Europe). Early publications included The Gay News Index (1982); ‘Declaring an Interest’ – a projected catalogue of gay images on television in Britain, (1982–83); and A.I.D.S. through the Media (1984). Work started on indexing the "News Library" of press cuttings, the records of gay organisations and a "Pink Thesaurus" was created by volunteers.

=== 1985 ===
The archives employed Margot Farnham (until 1988) to coordinate a volunteer group for an Oral History project. Thirty-five interviews were carried out using new sound recording/transcribing equipment. The tapes and transcriptions are now in the British Library Sound Archive, part of the British Library. The Oral History project culminated in two books "Inventing Ourselves" and "Walking After Midnight" (see References).

Around this time Kenneth Barrow had established the "National Lesbian & Gay Survey" within HCA. This was a Mass-Observation style survey engaging the opinions of "ordinary" lesbians and gay men on various vital or controversial contemporary issues, anthologies from which were later published by Routledge.

=== 1986 ===
The archives’ GLC funding terminated and the Lyndhurst Settlement helped with funding.

1987

A fundraiser was employed who wrote to around thirty charitable trusts – but none replied favourably. It looked unlikely that the London Lesbian & Gay Centre would receive funding and its closure was imminent, the Directors made a deliberate choice to try to house the Archives in a university, preferably in London.

=== 1988 ===
Core collections were moved to the Archives at the London School of Economics (LSE) with the active support of the Archivist, Angela Raspin. A number of gay activists, such as Peter Tatchell and John Chesterman, donated personal collections. The HCA at LSE have continued to grow with new accessions, and have been extensively sorted and indexed by Sue Donnelly and other professional archivists in her team.

=== 1989 ===
The Hall–Carpenter Archives Management Committee was in abeyance.

1991

Oliver Merrington, one of the original Directors, took over as the Honorary Secretary/Treasurer, arranging meetings, dissolving the Limited Company, issuing occasional newsletters and drawing up formal agreements with the repositories. He arranged a regular donation of press cuttings from the monthly Gay Times.

The Press Cuttings Collection proved much more difficult to house, as the LSE archive had a policy of not taking newspaper cuttings, the collection remained in the LLGC building in Cowcross Street, although the early cuttings relating to the start of the AIDS epidemic were moved to the Terence Higgins Trust. The cuttings then moved to SIGMA (an organisation conducting sexual research in relation to HIV) in Brixton. A professional archivist, Mark Collins, joined the volunteer team and started a re-sort of the cuttings collection which had not been touched for a decade. With his then partner Michael Anthony Chan arranged their transfer in 1995 to the Greenwich Lesbian and Gay Centre, in South East London.

=== 1997 ===
Simon Bradford, the librarian of the Cat Hill campus of Middlesex University was at this time creating a new Collections Room for a number of historical archives, and offered space to HCA.

In February the transfer was arranged and a formal ten-year loan agreement signed with Middlesex University. Oliver Merrington was appointed Honorary Research Archivist by the university, and held weekly volunteer sessions there to organise the cuttings.

=== 1998 ===
On 2 June the collection was opened by a Member of Parliament, Evan Harris (standing in for Stephen Twigg MP). The photograph collection from Gay News is also at Cat Hill, as well as a growing collection of lapel badges, T-shirts, printed carrier bags and banners from marches and demonstrations.

=== 2001 ===
The collection at Cat Hill was renamed The Lesbian and Gay Newsmedia Archive (LAGNA).

=== 2011 ===
LAGNA (press cuttings and book collection) moves to the Bishopsgate Library.

== See also ==
- Gay Liberation Front
- Queer studies

== Key sources ==
=== Books ===
- Howes, Keith; Meldrum, Julian (1983). Declaring an interest : a projected catalogue of gay images on television in Britain. Hall-Carpenter Archives. ISBN 978-0-946243-02-0. OCLC 12454691.
- Hall–Carpenter Archives. Lesbian Oral History Group (1989). Inventing Ourselves: Lesbian Life Stories. Routledge. pp. 228 pages. ISBN 0-415-02959-7.
- Hall–Carpenter Archives. Gay Men's Oral History Group (1989). Walking After Midnight: Gay Men's Life Stories. Routledge. pp. 238 pages. ISBN 0-415-02957-0.
- Hall Carpenter Archives; London School of Economics and Political Science (2001). Gay activism in Britain from 1958 : the Hall-Carpenter archives : [guide]. Gale Group. OCLC 60847551.

=== Articles ===
- Trenchard, Lorraine; Finch, Mark; Cairncross, Catherine (1987). Are we being served : lesbians, gays and broadcasting : project report. Hall-Carpenter Memorial Archives. OCLC 315643373.
- Joan Beveridge, Gay & Lesbian Arts and Media (GLAM) (10 January 2003). "Lottery helps gay seniors share their history". M2 Presswire. "Oral history workers based in London, Brighton, Manchester, Cardiff, Bristol and the South-west are hoping to record videotaped interviews with around 250 participants aged 55 years and over. The interview tapes will then be archived by the South East Film and Video Archive and at the Hall Carpenter Archive so that future generations of researchers can benefit from them." Note: South East Film and Video Archive is now called Screen Archive South East. Viewing copies of the tapes are available at the British Library Sound Archive Oral History Collections.
- Tatchell, Peter (8 June 2004). "Inside the gay museum: London's mayoral candidates agree on one thing: the need for an institution that chronicles our homosexual past. Its proposer, Peter Tatchell, explains what he'd put in it". The Guardian.
- Donnelly, Sue (2008). "Coming Out in the Archives: the Hall–Carpenter Archives at the London School of Economics". History Workshop Journal. 66 (1). Oxford University Press: 180–184. doi:10.1093/hwj/dbn042. ISSN 1363-3554. OCLC 362132963. "Abstract: The archive and journal collections of the Hall–Carpenter Archives (HCA) have been housed at the LSE since 1988. The archive, named in honour of novelist Radclyffe Hall and socialist writer, Edward Carpenter, was founded in 1982 to document the development of gay activism in the UK since the publication of the Wolfenden Report in 1958. The archive operated as an independent archive based at the London Lesbian and Gay Centre for several years before being transferred to the Archives of the London School of Economics. The archive is now a rich resource of archives, ephemera and printed materials documenting the development of gay activism and community in the United Kingdom since the 1950s."
