= Nationwide Festival of Light =

British grassroots movement

The Nationwide Festival of Light was a short-lived grassroots movement formed by British Christians concerned about the rise of the permissive society and social changes in English society by the late 1960s.

The movement was opposed to what they saw as the growing trends in the mass media for the explicit depiction of sexual and violent themes. Its culmination was a pair of mass rallies in Trafalgar Square and Hyde Park, London in September 1971.

It encouraged a number of other campaigns on similar themes, including the continuing Festival of Light movement in Australia, although it did not persist as a high-profile campaign in the UK, and the subsequent growth in the availability of sexually explicit and violent material would suggest that it had little effect on the media or on consumers.

== History ==
According to the NFOL's official history as written by John Capon, the organisation's genesis was in November 1970, when a young couple, Peter and Janet Hill, returned to England after four years as evangelical Baptist missionaries in India. The Hills experienced a sense of culture shock when they discovered that sexually explicit content was more prevalent in the mass media, in mid-July 1971 the NFOL was founded to oppose "pornography and moral pollution".

Founded by the journalist and author Malcolm Muggeridge alongside "clean-up TV" campaigner Mary Whitehouse, Labour cabinet member Lord Longford and Peter and Janet Hill, the movement was opposed to what they saw as the growing trends in the mass media for the explicit depiction of sexual and violent themes and for the restoration of conservative Christian morality in the UK. The British pop star Cliff Richard and actress Dora Bryan were key supporters of the NFOL from its onset.

Peter Hill imagined tens of thousands of young people marching on London to take a stand for Christian moral principles. The idea took root when he heard of 10,000 men engaged in a March of Witness through Blackburn calling for Christian moral standards to be restored to the nation.

Soon, Hill was in contact with a wide network of people, who shared his concern, and offered their encouragement. Among these were Malcolm Muggeridge, Mary Whitehouse, Lord Longford, Bishop Trevor Huddleston and Cliff Richard. Grassroots support came from Anglicans, Baptists, Plymouth Brethren and Pentecostal church denominations.

A working committee was established by Hill with Colonel Orde Dobbie (a Social Services administrator), Eddie Stride (a former shop steward and trade unionist, later the Rector of Christ Church, Spitalfields), Gordon Landreth (general secretary of the Evangelical Alliance), Rev. Jean Darnall (Pentecostal evangelist), Nigel Goodwin (a professional Christian actor) and Steve Stevens (a missionary aviator). Additional input was received from a larger Council of Reference which included well-known politicians, lawyers, doctors, trades unionists, bishops, ministers, and other public figures such as Dora Bryan and David Kossoff from the acting profession. The name "Festival of Light" was suggested by Malcolm Muggeridge, and Prince Charles sent "every good wish for the success of the Festival".

The movement had two expressed aims: to protest against "sexploitation" in the media and the arts, and to offer the teaching of Christ as the key to recovering moral stability in the nation. Some supporters naturally emphasized the first, and others the second. Plans were made for major public events, including the lighting of beacons on hilltops throughout the United Kingdom, and culminating in a massed march to a public rally in Trafalgar Square and an open-air concert of Christian music in Hyde Park.

The administrative task of enlisting the support of Christian churches and denominations throughout the UK was a colossal one, as indeed was the necessity for public relations with the press and the general public. The committee and many local volunteers were occupied with this throughout the first half of 1971. Then on 9 September, an initial rally was held in Westminster Central Hall, where the exploitation of sex and violence in the entertainment industry was denounced; the Gay Liberation Front (GLF) invaded this meeting in drag, releasing mice, sounding horns, and turning off all the lights.

Around the country more than seventy regional rallies followed. In Bristol the cathedral was filled to capacity, largely in reaction to the opening of a "sex supermarket" in the city. A "nationwide day of prayer" was observed on 19 September. Then on the night of 23 September bonfires and torches were lit on hilltops throughout Britain. In Sheffield a Calor gas flare was lit by Cliff Richard. Local authorities were generally co-operative, and individual opposition muted. There were probably about 300 such beacons, and one estimate claimed that 100,000 people took part in local events.

On 25 September, approximately 45,000 of the 100,000 predicted people assembled in Trafalgar Square for the NFOL rally. A platform and amplification equipment had been set up, and more than a dozen speakers took the microphone, among them Malcolm Muggeridge, Bill Davidson of the Salvation Army, and Mary Whitehouse.

A number of statements and proclamations were read out and received with applause by the crowd. Some called for a halt to the commercial exploitation of sex and violence. They warned that the "positive values" of love and respect for the individual and the family were under serious threat, and that once these were overthrown a safe and stable society could not long survive. They challenged the nation to recover "the pure idealism of Christ, the Light of the world, who taught that real love always wants what is best for others and defends the weak against exploitation by the corrupt". The speakers were of mixed ages and backgrounds. Some of the crowd heckled, but most cheered enthusiastically. Two-thirds of those present were said to be aged under twenty-five.

At the conclusion of the speeches, the crowd began to wind through the streets to Hyde Park, singing Christian songs as they went. In Hyde Park they joined those unable to get into Trafalgar Square. The Hyde Park rally started at 4 p.m., where a number of Christian music groups proclaimed the same message. Among the performers were Cliff Richard, Dana and Graham Kendrick. Reverend Jean Darnall led the rally. The main speaker in the park was Hollywood street evangelist Arthur Blessitt, later famous for travelling all over the globe carrying a 12-foot (3.7 m) wooden cross. He said it was only by having "a personal relationship with Jesus" that the desire for "immoral entertainment and illicit behaviour" would be eliminated, and invited the crowd to kneel in Hyde Park and make a personal acceptance of Jesus Christ as their Lord and Saviour.

== Response ==
In the days that followed, newspaper reports were mixed. Perhaps the warmest support came from Roman Catholic periodicals. Vast quantities of mail continued to pour into the organisers' office, but once they had recovered from the effort entailed in the public events, there seemed a large measure of uncertainty about the next stage, if any.

Within the movement itself there had always been diverse emphases and agendas. Those involved had frequently asked whether the Festival of Light should have an overtly Christian identity, or alternatively seek a wider constituency embracing all who would oppose "moral pollution". In the event it received support from many who had no initial Christian commitment, and some who were drawn to Christianity through the experience.

There was also uncertainty whether the intention of the organisers was to demand stricter censorship by law, or to seek a voluntary agreement on standards with the professional regulating bodies in the broadcasting and publishing industries, or simply to persuade individuals and families that they would benefit from opting out of a culture they could not control.

The Festival stimulated some inter-denominational contact among evangelical Christians, and is considered to be, along with the Billy Graham campaigns, the Keswick Convention, and the university "Christian unions" a significant expression of twentieth-century evangelical co-operation in the UK. Proponents claim that many Christians were persuaded to shun violent and sexually explicit films, magazines and television programmes, and to prefer newspapers lacking salacious content. For a decade or more, evangelicals generally held to this position.

In the nation as a whole, however, the impact of the Festival was much less evident than supporters had hoped, and it is thought that the openly evangelical positions espoused by the Festival's leaders had alienated a number of people who would otherwise have supported its aims. A much greater range of explicit material became available in the years which followed. Commercial, political and artistic pressures worked against any attempt at a stricter censorship, either by law or by voluntary agreement.

== Later developments ==
After 1971 the NFL committee continued to meet and gradually evolved into the Christian organisation Christian Action Research and Education (CARE), changing its name in 1983. The high-profile confrontational style of the original Festival gave way to a more discreet range of initiatives assisting individuals who have suffered the consequences of the perceived moral and social breakdown in British society, and encouraging a measure of political engagement on some issues.

== Media ==
In September 2022, The Nationwide Festival of Light was the subject of a BBC World Service Witness History radio documentary, presented by academic and writer Katie Edwards.

== Bibliography ==
- Capon, John (1972). And There Was Light: The Story of the Nationwide Festival of Light. London: Lutterworth. ISBN 0-7188-1936-5.
- Shepley, Nick; Sanders, Vivienne; Clements, Peter; Bunce, Robin (25 September 2015). History+ for Edexcel A Level: Democracies in change: Britain and the USA in the twentieth century. Hodder Education. ISBN 978-1-4718-3769-2.
- Ezard, John (16 March 1972). "Then there was light". The Guardian. London.
- Power, Lisa (1995). No Bath But Plenty of Bubbles: An Oral History of the Gay Liberation Front, 1970–1973. Cassell. ISBN 978-0-304-33195-6.
- Whipple, Amy C. (September 2010). "Speaking for Whom? The 1971 Festival of Light and the Search for the 'Silent Majority'". Contemporary British History. 24 (3): 319–339. doi:10.1080/13619462.2010.497254. S2CID 144839277.
- Willetts, Paul (4 April 2013). The Look of Love: The Life and Times of Paul Raymond, Soho's King of Clubs. Profile Books. ISBN 978-1-84765-994-1.
