= Charlotte Bach =

Hungarian-British impostor and fringe evolutionary theorist

- Charlotte Bach towards the end of her life
- Born: Karoly Hajdu; 1920 near Budapest, Hungary
- Died: 1981 (aged 60–61)
- Other names: Charlotte Bach, Karoly Hajdu, Baron Carl Hajdu
- Known for: Evolutionary Theorist

Charlotte Bach (born Karoly Hajdu; 1920–1981) was a Hungarian-British impostor and fringe evolutionary theorist. Her alternative theory of evolution acquired a cult following among prominent writers and scientists in London during the 1970s, who remained ignorant of her original identity until after her death.

== Early life ==
Hajdu was born near Budapest in 1920. In the wake of World War II she moved to England and in 1948 began to use the name Baron Carl Hajdu. In 1956 she collected money for Hungarian freedom fighters resisting the then Soviet occupation. The People, which specialised in lurid exposés, alleged that Hajdu had pocketed the proceeds. She was found guilty of fraud in 1957, and was forced into bankruptcy.

Hajdu then adopted the persona of writer and society hypnotherapist Michel Karoly. She rented an apartment in Mayfair. She began to acquire a following in polite society, and wrote an advice column in a mass-selling magazine of the day. Karoly continued in this role until 1965, when both her wife and stepson suddenly died. She was declared bankrupt again, and in 1966 was sentenced to two months in jail for acquiring a loan whilst bankrupt.

By her own account, the sudden deaths had precipitated a profound identity crisis.

== Lectures ==
In 1968, Hajdu adopted the new identity of Dr Charlotte Bach, a supposed former lecturer at Budapest's Eötvös Loránd University, whose alumni included the philosophers Michael and Karl Polanyi and the mathematician John von Neumann.

'Dr Bach' would openly tell lecture audiences how at first, putting ads in the windows of local newsagents, she had worked as a dominatrix. This experience had provided invaluable research data, she said, for the purpose of compiling a dictionary of psychology. These researches had in turn led to the all-embracing theory. She lived as Charlotte Bach until she died in 1981.

=== Human ethology ===
In 1971 Bach unveiled her transformative, as she would insist, theory of evolution. Among other things, she argued, it correctly displaced Darwinism in favour of Lamarckism. Drawing heavily on the work of animal ethologists such as Tinbergen and Konrad Lorenz, she argued that humans experience in varying degrees a pull towards becoming the opposite sex. This urge could either be denied or asseverated: gays and femme lesbians, for example, are women in men's bodies or vice versa, but transvestites and butch lesbians are not. This gave rise to eight possible permutations.

This deep-seated and ineradicable phenomenon, she argued, was the true engine of evolutionary change. It was also the key to the proper understanding of culture—including science, politics and religion. Upon such reasoning, backed up by a polymathic accumulation of supporting evidence and a forceful lecturing style, she elaborated what she called the science of Human Ethology.

Eminent scientists who sought to engage with the apparent challenges of Bach's theory included the biologist Brian Goodwin and W. Grey Walter, a pioneer of cybernetics and former head of the Burden Neurological Institute in Bristol.

Bach attracted the interest in particular of the English writer Colin Wilson, as well as of a number of eminent British scientists and academics. Wilson began to write about her theory. Bach became a cult figure. A small group of followers would gather at her home at Holly Lodge in Highgate, while weekly lectures would take place elsewhere. An Institute of Human Ethology was set up to promote her ideas and stimulate further research. Her literary executors included the then professor of educational technology at Britain's Open University. She was invited to speak at Sussex University and, ironically, at Darwin College, Cambridge.

In due course, leading members of London's then burgeoning Gay Liberation movement took up human ethology and started publishing pamphlets of their own, much attracted by the tantalising notion of homosexuals as the vanguard of evolutionary change.

Bach continued to elaborate upon her original thesis up to the time of her death in 1981.
