= Christian Action, Research and Education =

UK charity

- Predecessor: Nationwide Festival of Light
- Type: Christian lobby group
- Headquarters: 53 Romney Street; Westminster; London SW1P 3RF; United Kingdom
- Executive Chairman: Lyndon Bowring
- Chief Executive: Ross Hendry
- Website: www.care.org.uk

Christian Action, Research and Education (CARE) is a social policy charity based in the United Kingdom, with offices in England, Scotland and Northern Ireland.

== Founding and programmes ==
CARE began in 1971 as the Nationwide Festival of Light, but was renamed in 1983 to reflect a substantial shift in emphasis. Over the following decades it established the following departments, in the belief that Christians should show active care as well as campaigning for moral standards in society:

- Care for the Family, a registered charity now independent of CARE, initially established in 1988.
- Care Confidential, which runs pregnancy counselling centres and became independent in July 2011.
- Caring Services (defunct).
- Care for Education (defunct).
- Fostering, long term and remand care (defunct).
- Evaluate, CARE's sex and relationships education programme.
- Leadership Programme, an internship programme securing placements for graduates. Some work as researchers for MPs, and MSPs, and members of the House of Lords while others work in Christian NGOs.

== Charity registration ==
Christian Action Research and Education (CARE) Trust (registered charity number 288485, registered 12 January 1984) ceased to exist on 30 September 2008. CARE (Christian Action Research and Education) (registered charity number 1066963, registered 18 December 1997) is still operational.

== Leadership ==
Ross Hendry has been CEO of CARE since 2021 when he took over from co-founder of the organisation Lyndon Bowring who moved into the role of Chairman.

== Finance ==
CARE's annual income to March 2021 was over £2 million, mostly from voluntary donations.

== Causes ==
CARE has been described as "an evangelical charity that promotes traditional family values". The organisation has actively campaigned against LGBT rights, abortion, stem cell research and assisted dying bills.

=== Campaigns on sexual ethics ===
Labour Party insiders credited CARE with significant influence in support of Section 28 regarding education and homosexuality.

CARE is listed in the UK Parliament's register of all-party groups as the secretariat of the All-party parliamentary group (APPG) on Prostitution and the Global Sex Trade, a pressure group to encourage 'government action to tackle individuals who create demand for sexual services'.

In 2015, CARE backed a private member's bill to prohibit the advertising of prostitution, the Advertising of Prostitution (Prohibition) Bill 2015–16, which was introduced by Lord McColl of Dulwich in the House of Lords.

=== Other campaigns ===
CARE's 2010 report on taxation claimed that the tax burden had moved from single people with no dependants into families with two adults but only a single earner in them.

== Criticisms ==
CARE's work has been described as "propaganda" in the House of Lords.

In 2000, MP Ben Bradshaw accused CARE of being "a bunch of homophobic bigots". CARE has also been criticised for its opposition to abortion and gay rights.

In 2009, CARE had a stall at an event run by Anglican Mainstream called 'Sex in the City'. The organisers claimed the event was "about the plethora of sexual issues confronting us in today's society, including mentoring the sexually broken, the sexualisation of culture, pornography, the Bible and sex, and marriage, the family and sex". Speakers included founder of National Association for Research and Therapy of Homosexuality (NARTH), Joseph Nicolosi, and co-founder of Jews Offering New Alternatives to Homosexuality, Arthur Goldberg, both of whom have been described as advocates of harmful conversion therapies. CARE subsequently stated that it opposes abusive conversion therapy practices, while wanting to make sure that prospective laws do not impede religious liberty.

CARE's funding of political research assistants by a "right-wing Christian" lobby group has attracted controversy, although CARE has stated that its graduates are not permitted to lobby on behalf of CARE, and that it is a purely educational programme. In 2022, an investigation by openDemocracy revealed that 20 British MPs had taken staff members from CARE since 2012.

CARE has funded the network of CareConfidential crisis pregnancy centres in the UK, some of which came under criticism in a 2014 investigation by The Daily Telegraph when counsellors were filmed undercover claiming abortions would increase chances of breast cancer and could predispose women to becoming child sexual abusers.
