= Weinstein Hall occupation =

Building occupation in New York City

- Date: September 20–25, 1970
- Location: Weinstein Hall, Greenwich Village, New York City, New York, U.S. 40°42′45.821″N 74°0′21.654″W
- Caused by: Refusal to allow gay dances
- Result: Occupiers evicted; Gay dances allowed after further protests; Founding of Street Transvestite Action Revolutionaries (STAR)

Parties
Gay Liberation Front (GLF); Gay Youth; Transcendental Students; Christopher Street Liberation Day Committee; Gay Student Liberation; Red Butterfly; NYU Women's Liberation; NYU Liberation Front; Gay Activists Alliance (GAA, joined later)	New York University administration; New York City Police Department (NYPD)

The Weinstein Hall occupation was organized by gay liberation activists from September 20 to 25, 1970, to protest the cancellation of gay dances at a residence building at New York University in Greenwich Village. The building occupation, which occurred in the wake of the 1969 Stonewall riots, saw the takeover of the sub-basement of Weinstein Hall, where the dances were set to take place. Occupiers discussed various topics, chanted, danced, sang folk songs, and played games, with lesbians and street queens (Note: A term used to refer to unhoused transgender youths of color.) forming connections.

The occupation ended when members of a police tactical unit confronted the occupiers, threatening to shoot them if they did not vacate the premises. A march through Greenwich Village ensued, after which the occupiers dispersed. After the occupation, further protests took place at NYU's Loeb Student Center, leading the university to eventually permit gay dances at Weinstein Hall. Later, several participants founded Street Transvestite Action Revolutionaries (STAR), which provided shelter for unhoused transgender (Note: In line with anthropologist David Valentine's definition of "transgender" as a "useful shorthand in describing non-normative genders; as a way of recognizing and objectifying a group of diverse people who have not always been seen to inhabit the category", this article uses the term broadly to encompass multiple non-normative genders and forms of gender presentation.) youth through its STAR House initiative.

== Background ==
Between 1890 and 1940, a distinct gay culture emerged in New York City. Gays in New York organized male beauty pageants in Coney Island and drag balls in Harlem. They also founded gay bars in Greenwich Village, which were often the targets of police raids. Among these was the Stonewall Inn, which was founded on Christopher Street in the 1930s and had established a reputation as a gay bar by 1967. At the time, Greenwich Village was home to a diverse community of artists, bohemians, immigrants, and LGBTQ people. On June 28, 1969, police raided the Stonewall Inn and attempted to arrest several patrons, including cross-dressers and sex workers. In response, several patrons of the bar began pelting the police with various objects, including bricks, marking the beginning of the Stonewall riots. Marsha P. Johnson and Sylvia Rivera are often credited with starting the riots, though their actual role is debated. (Note: According to Duberman, "rumor has it" that Johnson, upset by several "no-shows" at a party she had organized, went to the Stonewall on June 27, 1969, to dance. He also claims that Rivera went to Stonewall that night with her lover, a many named Gary, and Tammy Novak. Stonewall veteran Morty Manford claims that Johnson threw a shot glass at a mirror when police arrived, shouting "I got my civil rights!" Carter identifies Johnson as having been "almost indubitably among the first to be violent that night and may possibly even have been the first". However, he notes that several "highly credible witnesses" claim that Rivera was not present at Stonewall at all. Playwright Robert Heide claims that Johnson shouted at police and threw rocks at them. Mama Jean Devente, a friend of Johnson's, remembers Johnson helping her tend to her wounds after she was beaten by police. Johnson herself claims that she did not arrive at the scene of the riots until 2:00 a.m, after they had already started. Stein claims that while they "definitely participated in subsequent developments", it is unlikely that Johnson or Rivera were present at the beginning of the riots.) Soon after, gay rights activists founded various advocacy organizations, including the Gay Liberation Front (GLF) and the Gay Activists Alliance (GAA).

== Occupation ==
In September 1970, the administration at New York University, which is located in Greenwich Village, canceled several upcoming dances organized by the Christopher Street Liberation Day Committee at Weinstein Hall after learning that they would be "homosexual" events. According to Rivera, several wealthy families were offended at the idea of queer dances and feared that their "impressionable children were going to be harmed". In response, beginning on September 20, members of several activist organizations occupied the hall's sub-basement. These included the GLF, the Christopher Street Liberation Day Committee, Gay Student Liberation, Gay Youth, Red Butterfly, NYU Women's Liberation, NYU Liberation Front, and Transcendental Students. Johnson and Rivera also participated. The occupiers discussed various topics together, chanted, danced, sang folk songs, and played games such as charades and spin the bottle. The contemporary publication Gay Flames estimates that 80 people were present for the initial occupation. After this, the number of occupiers varied throughout, from 10 during the morning hours to hundreds during the day.

According to occupier Karla Jay, most residents were initially "horrified" because "they had been in New York for less than a week and they were being overrun by radical faggots and dykes". However, after the occupiers canvassed in the dorms, the residents came to support them, bringing them food from the university cafeteria, among other things. Residents of the hall voted to support the protesters by a 2–1 margin, and all residents unanimously agreed to prevent police intervention. Straight students occasionally interacted with occupiers in the hall's laundry room, with the occupiers explaining their lifestyles and distributing literature.

Initially, occupiers slept in various places depending on their sexuality and gender presentation: street queens on couches in the back of the basement and lesbians on pool tables in the front. The street queens were tasked with cooking, cleaning, and fundraising. On the night of September 21, several of the occupiers showered in the hall matron's bathroom. By the night of September 24, the street queens and lesbians had begun mingling, playing cards together, and exchanging makeup tips. At some point during the occupation, activist Arthur Bell suggested that the occupiers seek the assistance of the relatively conservative GAA. This suggestion was "loudly booed". However, several members of the GAA did eventually join the occupation.

On September 25, a police tactical unit armed with riot control gear confronted the occupiers, threatening to shoot them if they did not vacate the building. While Rivera attempted to initiate a chant in response, the occupiers were ultimately evicted to the steps outside the hall. Some occupiers, including Rivera, initially wanted to start a riot. They ultimately led a march down 8th Street towards Sheridan Square, then to the site of the Stonewall riots, then back to Weinstein Hall before finally dispersing.

== Aftermath and legacy ==
Soon after the occupation's end, Rivera published a flyer titled "GAY POWER—WHEN DO WE WANT IT? OR DO WE?" The flyer was published under the alias "Street Transvestites for Gay Power" and discussed the Weinstein Hall occupation, claiming that it was "lost when we left on request of the pigs" and that the "next demonstration" was going to be more difficult. Some argue that the publication of this flyer represented the founding of a new organization called Street Transvestites for Gay Power. Others, such as Bebe Scarpi, claim that Rivera was "defining herself as a street transvestite gay liberation advocate", not declaring the foundation of a new organization.

A group called Street Transvestites for Gay Power later organized protests at NYU's Loeb Student Center and Bellevue Hospital. At NYU, they demanded the creation of a gay community center, open enrollment for gay people, and the right to be openly gay with fear of retaliation. At Bellevue, they demanded an end to psychiatric abuse and compulsory sterilization, as well as free, community-controlled health and dental care. NYU responded by allowing at least one gay dance to take place at Weinstein Hall. Later that year, Johnson and Rivera founded Street Transvestite Action Revolutionaries (STAR), which academic Samuel Galen Ng claims emerged from Street Transvestites for Gay Power. With the assistance of the GLF and Gay Youth, STAR created STAR House, a free shelter for transgender youth in the East Village, Manhattan.

During Stonewall 50 in 2019, NYU acknowledged its cancellation of queer dances on its website, as well as in a press release, which discussed the police's role in ending the occupation. An event was also held at NYU on its 50th anniversary. The event was attended by several activists who were present for the occupation and featured an anniversary ceremony, as well as a panel discussing the occupation. Later, a commemorative plaque was placed at Weinstein Hall.

== Sources ==
- "Battles Go On". Gay Flames. New York. 1970 – via JSTOR.
- Carter, David (2010). Stonewall: The Riots That Sparked the Gay Revolution. New York: Macmillan. ISBN 978-0-312-67193-8.
- Carter, David (2019). "Exploding the Myths of Stonewall". Gay City News.
- Chauncey, George (1994). Gay New York: Gender, Urban Culture, and the Making of the Gay Male World, 1890-1940. New York: Basic Books. ISBN 0-465-02633-8.
- Cohen, Stephan (2008). The Gay Liberation Youth Movement in New York: 'An Army of Lovers Cannot Fail'. New York; London: Routledge. ISBN 978-0-203-94057-0.
- Duberman, Martin B. (1994). Stonewall. New York: Open Road Media. ISBN 978-1-480-42384-8.
- Johnson, Marsha P.; Wicker, Randy (1989). "Marsha P. Johnson & Randy Wicker". Making Gay History (Interview). Interviewed by Marcus, Eric. NOTE: This interview was presented as part of the Making Gay History podcast.
- La Fountain-Stokes, Lawrence (2021). Translocas: The Politics of Puerto Rican Drag and Trans Performance. Ann Arbor: University of Michigan Press. ISBN 978-0-472-12607-1.
- Raj, Roshni (2020). "NYU Remembers 50th Anniversary of Weinstein Occupation Today". Washington Square News.
- Ng, Samuel Galen (2013). "Trans Power! Sylvia Lee Rivera's STAR and the Black Panther Party". Left History. 17 (1). doi:10.25071/1913-9632.39213. ISSN 1913-9632.
- Nothing, Ehn (2013). "Queens Against Society". Street Transvestite Action Revolutionaries: Survival, Revolt, and Queer Antagonist Struggle. Untorelli Press. pp. 3–11.
  NOTE: This book is primarily a collection of primary source documents. No editor is credited, but activist Tourmaline claims to have uncovered much of the archival material. See "Street Evangelists and Transgender Saints: Sylvia Rivera, Marsha P. Johnson, and the Religions of the Afro-Americas" by Ahmad Greene-Hayes, p. 46.
- Rivera, Sylvia (2013). "GAY POWER—WHEN DO WE WANT IT? OR DO WE?". Street Transvestite Action Revolutionaries: Survival, Revolt, and Queer Antagonist Struggle. Untorelli Press. p. 18.
  NOTE: See previous note about Street Transvestite Action Revolutionaries: Survival, Revolt, and Queer Antagonist Struggle.
- Rivera, Sylvia (2013). "Queens in Exile, the Forgotten Ones". Street Transvestite Action Revolutionaries: Survival, Revolt, and Queer Antagonist Struggle. Untorelli Press. pp. 40–55.
  NOTE: See previous note about Street Transvestite Action Revolutionaries: Survival, Revolt, and Queer Antagonist Struggle.
- Segal, Mark (2022). "Remembering Gay Liberation Front's NYU protest". Philadelphia Gay News.
- Stein, Marc (2021). "Stonewall Riots". In Goldberg, Abbie E.; Beemyn, Genny (eds.). The SAGE Encyclopedia of Trans Studies. Vol. 2. Thousand Oaks: SAGE. pp. 802–806.
- Stryker, Susan (2017). Transgender History. Berkeley: Seal Press. ISBN 978-1-58005-690-8.
- Tourmaline (2025). Marsha: The Joy and Defiance of Marsha P. Johnson. New York: Tiny Reparations Books. ISBN 978-0-59318-568-1.
