= Gay Youth =

LGBTQ activist organization

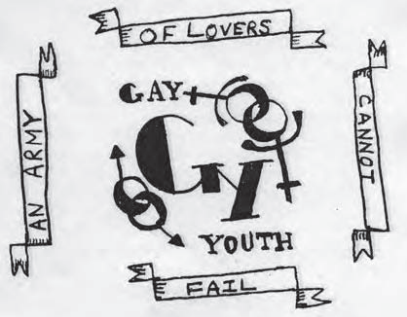
- Pen drawing by Marc Wald, 1973
- Abbreviation: GY
- Formation: February 1970; 56 years ago
- Founder: Mark Segal
- Purpose: LGBTQ youth advocacy
- Affiliations: Gay Liberation Front (GLF)

Gay Youth (GY), later known as Bisexual, Lesbian and Gay Youth of New York (BiGLTYNY), was an organization founded by Stonewall veteran Mark Segal in 1970 to advocate for LGBTQ youth. Originally a cell of the Gay Liberation Front (GLF), GY's primary goal was to meet the needs of youth that were not adequately served by other LGBTQ advocacy organizations. Additional goals included combating ageism within the gay liberation movement and fostering connections between young activists. Its headquarters and leadership shifted numerous times throughout its existence. GY chapters were founded throughout the United States and parts of Canada.

GY offered various services for LGBTQ youth. In addition to publishing a newsletter, it also hosted a youth hotline, gave talks at schools, and held regular dances and movie nights. It participated in several notable demonstrations, including the first Christopher Street Liberation Day rally on the anniversary of the Stonewall riots and the Weinstein Hall occupation, both in 1970. It also, at various times, engaged in leafleting and radio call-in campaigns.

In 1983, the organization was integrated into the Lesbian, Gay, Bisexual & Transgender Community Center (also known as The Center) on 13th Street, where it continued to offer services for LGBTQ youth. At the time of its integration, it was considered "the largest and oldest gay and lesbian youth organization in the world". In 2000, it withdrew from The Center and joined the Empire State Coalition of Youth and Family Services, going defunct some time in the early-to-mid 2000s. Segal, GY's founder, later became the publisher of the Philadelphia Gay News.

== Background ==
One of the policemen came up to me and asked for ID. I was eighteen, which was the legal drinking age in New York in those days. I rustled through my wallet, very frightened, and quickly handed him my ID... I was relieved to be among the first to get out of the bar.

— Mark Segal discussing the Stonewall riots, quoted in "'They’ve lost that wounded look': Stonewall and the struggle for LGBT+ rights" by Nicola Field

Between 1890 and 1940, a distinct gay culture emerged in New York City. Gays in New York organized male beauty pageants in Coney Island and drag balls in Harlem. They also founded gay bars in Greenwich Village, which were often the targets of police raids. Among these was the Stonewall Inn, which was founded on Christopher Street in Greenwich Village in the 1930s and had established a reputation as a gay bar by 1967. At the time, Greenwich Village was home to a diverse community of artists, bohemians, immigrants, and LGBTQ people.

On June 28, 1969, police raided the Stonewall and attempted to arrest several patrons, including cross-dressers and sex workers. In response, several patrons of the bar began pelting the police with various objects, including bricks, marking the beginning of the Stonewall riots. Among those present when the riots began was Mark Segal, an eighteen-year-old native of Philadelphia, Pennsylvania and member of the Mattachine Action Committee. That night, Segal and several associates from the committee left messages in chalk on the sidewalk to encourage people to return to the Stonewall the following night. In the aftermath of the riots, older members of the committee expressed skepticism about Segal's ability to contribute to the group due to his age. Believing it to be too conservative, Segal and his associates left the committee to join the Gay Liberation Front (GLF).

== History ==
=== Organizational development ===
Gay Youth was founded in February 1970 as a cell of the GLF. At the time of its formation, it had 11-12 members, including Zazu Nova. While there were Black and female members, the majority were white men and boys. There was also an age limit, with members required to be under 21. Segal was GY's first president. It was founded for the benefit of young gay rights activists whose needs were not fully met by other organizations, such as the GLF, the Gay Activists Alliance (GAA), or Radicalesbians. Its primary goals were to oppose ageism within the gay liberation movement, to create connections between otherwise isolated youth activists, and to "catalyze" a broader "national movement". From 1970 to 1971, it was unofficially headquartered out of Segal's apartment in the East Village, Manhattan, which hosted its files, its youth hotline, and the office for its newsletter: GY: Gay Youth’s Gay Journal. The newsletter, which was published from 1970 to 1971, featured commentary, poetry, short stories, and comics.

Soon after GY's establishment, its members left the GLF, believing they were in a better position to relate to people their own age. It held meetings in various places, including Alternate U, a leftist education center in Greenwich Village that commonly hosted GLF events at the time; the Church of the Holy Apostles, another regular meeting place for LGBTQ organizations; the Gay Community Center on 3rd Street; the GAA headquarters on Wooster Street; and Segal's apartment, which hosted regular movie nights. According to one of its former members, Tony Russomanno, GY's meetings avoided "substantive discussion". Per Russomanno:

The important thing was that there were people there talking. It didn’t really matter what they were talking about.

Members of GY solicited funds during GLF meetings at the Church of the Holy Apostles. They also held dances at Alternate U, attended demonstrations, called into radio shows, distributed leaflets, participated in television interviews, and gave talks at schools. Decisions for the organization were made by consensus during its early years. Its ideological platform began to develop in 1970. That year, in an edition of GY, member Ian Edelstein argued that the oppression of gays stems from internalized homophobia within society and that this homophobia will eventually need to be confronted.

=== Early actions ===
On June 28, 1970, GY marched in the first Christopher Street Liberation Day rally on the anniversary of the Stonewall riots. Members also participated in demonstrations against the Vietnam War. The group publicly endorsed Jane Fonda and Donald Sutherland's FTA Show, which was put on for the benefit of anti-war American soldiers. However, it withdrew its endorsement after Fonda reacted negatively to a kiss between two lesbians at a benefit event held in New York. (Note: According to Cohen, she later apologized for her reaction.) It also participated in a 1970 protest against the harassment of LGBTQ people by police. Aside from GY, the protest was also attended by the GAA, the GLF, and Radicalesbians.

In September 1970, GY participated in the occupation of Weinstein Hall to protest New York University (NYU)'s decision to cancel several upcoming dances after learning that they would be "homosexual" events. GY, along with several other activist organizations, took over the Weinstein Hall sub-basement, where they discussed various topics, chanted, danced, sang folk songs, and played games for several days. On September 25, the occupation was broken up by a police tactical unit, prompting the occupiers to leave and march throughout Greenwich Village.

While Segal was president, GY staged a protest against the preaching of Troy Perry, a gay man who served as the reverend of the Metropolitan Community Church on 36th Street. According to academic Stephan L. Cohen, GY initially saw Perry's preaching as "counter-revolutionary". However, the protest came to an end after Segal attended an address given by Perry. Segal later recalled that while his approach was different, Perry's overall message resonated with him, and they eventually became friends. GY also protested the adverse conditions faced by LGBTQ youth in suburban areas.

=== Expansion ===
Under Segal's leadership, GY chapters were established in Baltimore, Maryland; Chicago, Illinois; Columbus, Ohio; Denver, Colorado; Los Angeles, California; Louisville, Kentucky; Syracuse, New York; Toronto, Ontario; Valley Stream, New York; Washington, D.C.; and Worcester, Massachusetts. Many of these chapters offered peer support groups where LGBTQ youth could come together and discuss their experiences. The Los Angeles chapter was particularly active, offering peer support groups, family therapy referrals, and a telephone hotline. The group also gave talks at high schools; organized dances, parties, and picnics; and worked with the Gay Community Services Center to advocate for imprisoned LGBTQ youth. In addition to establishing new chapters nationwide, GY also formed affiliations with GLF activists in Philadelphia; Detroit, Michigan; and Tampa, Florida.

After 1971, GY experienced several significant changes. Segal returned to Philadelphia in 1971, prompting Mark Horn to become GY's president. With the loss of Segal's apartment, GY headquarters moved to the GAA offices. Some time in 1973, Marc Wald became president. As of 1974, voting had replaced GY's consensus-based decision-making model. That year, a majority of GY members voted to move the GY headquarters to the Church of the Beloved Disciple, an LGBTQ-friendly Catholic church on 14th Street. Michael Wolcott also became president in 1974. GY discussed various topics at its meetings during this time, including age disparity in sexual relationships and youth isolation. By the mid-1970s, its headquarters moved to the offices of the Mattachine Society, which were located on Christopher Street. On April 29, 1980, GY president Mark Moffett gave a speech criticizing homophobia within the gay rights movement, as well as its close ties to the Democratic Party.

=== Integration into The Center ===
By 1983, GY had changed its name to Bisexual, Lesbian and Gay Youth of New York (BiGLTYNY). That year, it was integrated into the Lesbian, Gay, Bisexual & Transgender Community Center (also known as The Center) on 13th Street. While there, it offered peer support groups and counseling. It also provided referrals to other organizations and organized social activities for LGBTQ youth. It remained at The Center until roughly 2000, when it withdrew and joined the Empire State Coalition of Youth and Family Services. As of 2008, the organization was no longer active.

== Legacy ==
At the time of its integration into The Center, GY was recognized as "the largest and oldest gay and lesbian youth organization in the world". GY is discussed at length in the book The Gay Liberation Youth Movement in New York by Stephan L. Cohen. Cohen posits that GY implemented all three of the major accomplishments of the gay liberation movement as defined by historian John D'Emilio: liberation, affirmation, and organization. He further argues that GY provided specific benefits for gay youth by giving them a social outlet, fostering communal resources and social networks, and countering the pressures imposed on them by heterosexual society. He concludes by noting the continued activism of many former GY members, including Segal, who became the publisher of Philadelphia Gay News; Russomanno, who became a journalist; and Horn, who became an advertiser.

== Sources ==
- Chauncey, George (1994). Gay New York: Gender, Urban Culture, and the Making of the Gay Male World, 1890-1940. New York: Basic Books. ISBN 0-465-02633-8.
- Cohen, Stephan (2008). The Gay Liberation Youth Movement in New York: 'An Army of Lovers Cannot Fail'. New York; London: Routledge. ISBN 978-0-203-94057-0.
- Davis, Amanda (2017). "LGBT Community Center". NYC LGBT Historic Sites Project.
- Dolkart, Andrew S. (2017). "Metropolitan Community Church of New York". NYC LGBT Historic Sites Project.
- Field, Nicola (2018). "'They've lost that wounded look': Stonewall and the struggle for LGBT+ rights". Critical and Radical Social Work. 6 (1): 35–50. doi:10.1332/204986018X15199226335132. ISSN 2049-8608.
- King, Sarah (2021). "The FTA Show: Jane Fonda, the GI Movement, and Celebrity Activism in the Late Vietnam War". Peace & Change. 46 (2): 119–141. doi:10.1111/pech.12458. ISSN 0149-0508.
- Ng, Samuel Galen (2013). "Trans Power! Sylvia Lee Rivera's STAR and the Black Panther Party". Left History. 17 (1). doi:10.25071/1913-9632.39213. ISSN 1913-9632.
- Shockley, Jay (2017). "Church of the Holy Apostles – NYC LGBT Historic Sites Project". NYC LGBT Historic Sites Project.
- Shockley, Jay (2017). "Gay Activists Alliance Firehouse". NYC LGBT Historic Sites Project.
- Shockley, Jay (2017). "Tony Pastor's Downtown / Gay Community Center". NYC LGBT Historic Sites Project.
- Shockley, Jay (2023). "Gay Liberation Front at Alternate U." NYC LGBT Historic Sites Project.
- Shockley, Jay (2023). "Mark Segal Residence / Gay Youth Headquarters". NYC LGBT Historic Sites Project.
- Stein, Marc (2021). "Stonewall Riots". In Goldberg, Abbie E.; Beemyn, Genny (eds.). The SAGE Encyclopedia of Trans Studies. Vol. 2. Thousand Oaks: Sage Publishing. pp. 802–806. ISBN 978-1-5443-9381-0.
- "Troy Perry". LGBTQ Religious Archives Network.
- White, Heather R. (2024). "Coming Out in the Parish Hall: New York's Gay Movement and the Church of the Holy Apostles, 1969–70". QTR. 1 (2). Duke University Press: 149–170. doi:10.1215/29944724-11365529. ISSN 2994-4724.
