= T&S =

T&S may refer to:

- Trust and safety in online platforms
- T&S Stores, a former UK convenience store chain
- T&S Communications, a Chinese telecommunications company

== See also ==
- TS (disambiguation)
