= Street Transvestite Action Revolutionaries =

American LGBTQ activist organization

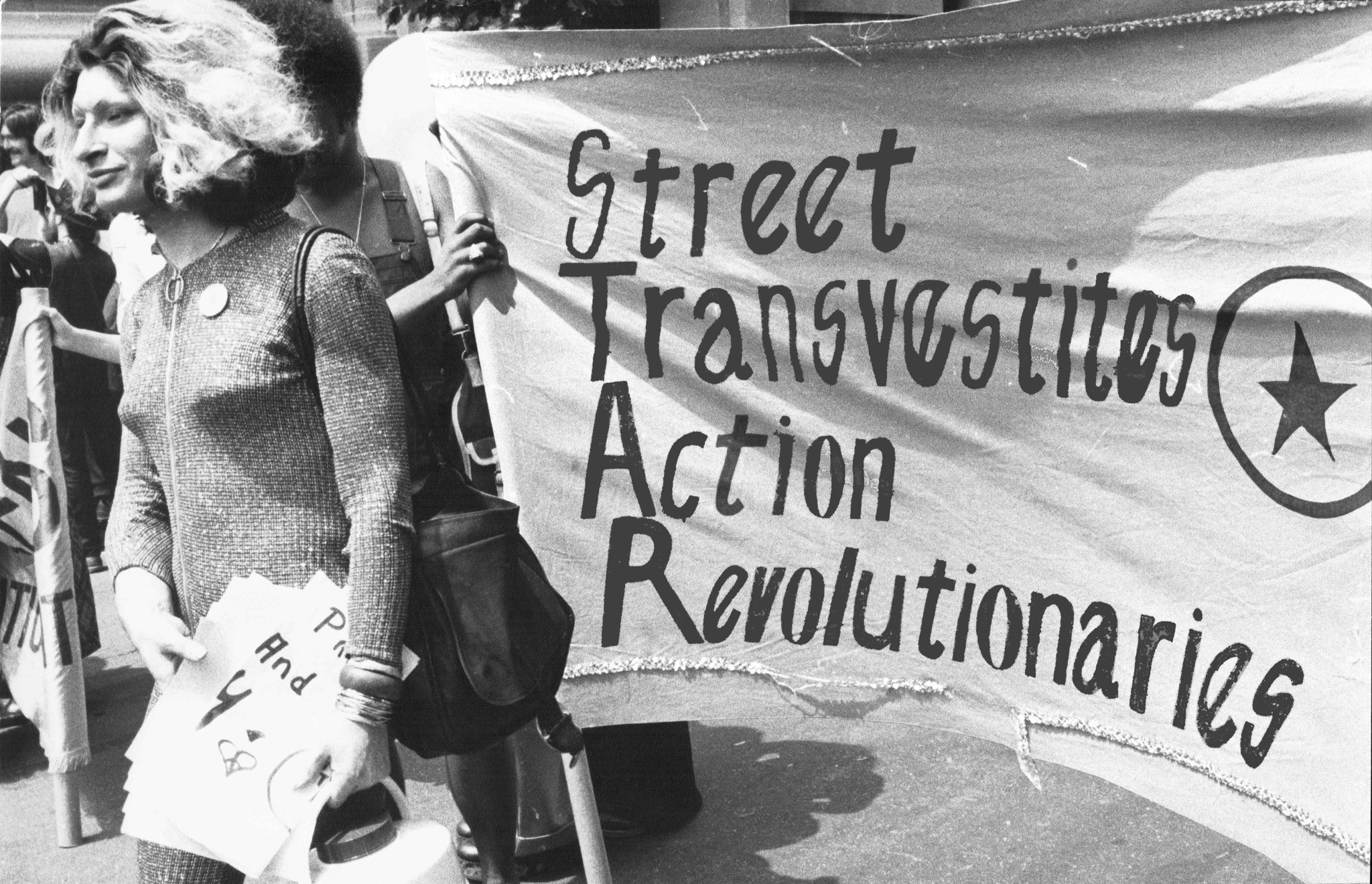
- Sylvia Rivera standing in front of a STAR banner in 1970
- Abbreviation: STAR
- Formation: 1970; 56 years ago
- Founders: Sylvia Rivera; Marsha P. Johnson
- Dissolved: 1973; 53 years ago (reformed 2000–2002)
- Purpose: To provide shelter and food to homeless LGBTQ youth; Transgender rights
- Headquarters: STAR House; 213 East 2nd Street; New York, New York 10009; US
- Location: East Village, Manhattan
- Coordinates: 40.721743°N 73.983125°W
- Affiliations: Gay Activists Alliance; Gay Liberation Front

Street Transvestite Action Revolutionaries (STAR) was an organization founded by Stonewall veterans Sylvia Rivera and Marsha P. Johnson in the wake of the Weinstein Hall occupation to advocate for LGBTQ rights. Taking influence from contemporary gay advocacy groups such as the Gay Activists Alliance (GAA) and the Gay Liberation Front (GLF), as well as from revolutionary nationalist groups like the Black Panther Party, STAR advocated for bodily autonomy, in addition to free clothing, education, food, healthcare, housing, and transportation. It also condemned transphobic abuse and discrimination, both in and out of the LGBTQ community.

In 1970, STAR founded STAR House in the East Village, Manhattan. The house, which was open from November 1970 to July 1971, provided food and shelter for transgender (Note: In line with anthropologist David Valentine's definition of "transgender" as a "useful shorthand in describing non-normative genders; as a way of recognizing and objectifying a group of diverse people who have not always been seen to inhabit the category", this article uses the term broadly to encompass multiple non-normative genders and forms of gender presentation.) youth. During that time, STAR also advocated for prison reform and worked with various organizations, including the GAA, the GLF, and the Mattachine Society to support LGBTQ rights. After the closure of STAR House, STAR participated in discussions regarding the New York City Gay Rights Bill proposed by the GAA in 1970, attending several hearings about the bill to advocate for the inclusion of transgender rights.

STAR's activity began to decline in 1972. According to Rivera, the group "died" in 1973 after attempts to exclude transgender people during the Christopher Street Liberation Day rally that year. However, it was temporarily revived in 2000 after the murder of Amanda Milan. STAR has been commemorated in museum exhibits and documentaries. Academic Benjamin Shepard credits STAR as "[America]'s first trans political organization". Others, such as Stephan Cohen and Abram J. Lewis, argue that STAR prefigured later developments in queer theory and transgender activism.

== Background ==
Between 1890 and 1940, a distinct gay culture emerged in New York City. Gays in New York organized male beauty pageants in Coney Island and drag balls in Harlem. They also founded gay bars in Greenwich Village, which were often the targets of police raids. Among these was the Stonewall Inn, which was founded on Christopher Street in Greenwich Village in the 1930s and had established a reputation as a gay bar by 1967. At the time, Greenwich Village was home to a diverse community of artists, bohemians, immigrants, and LGBTQ people. On June 28, 1969, police raided the Stonewall Inn and attempted to arrest several patrons, including cross-dressers and sex workers. In response, several patrons of the bar began pelting the police with various objects, including bricks, marking the beginning of the Stonewall riots. Marsha P. Johnson and Sylvia Rivera are often credited with starting the riots, though their actual role in the riots is debated. (Note: According to Duberman, "rumor has it" that Johnson, upset by several "no-shows" at a party she had organized, went to the Stonewall on June 27, 1969, to dance. He also claims that Rivera went to Stonewall that night with her lover, a man named Gary, and Tammy Novak. Stonewall veteran Morty Manford claims that Johnson threw a shot glass at a mirror when police arrived, shouting "I got my civil rights!" Carter identifies Johnson as having been "almost indubitably among the first to be violent that night and may possibly even have been the first". However, he notes that several "highly credible witnesses" claim that Rivera was not present at Stonewall at all. Playwright Robert Heide claims that Johnson shouted at police and threw rocks at them. Mama Jean Devente, a friend of Johnson's, remembers Johnson helping her tend to her wounds after she was beaten by police. Johnson herself claims that she did not arrive at the scene of the riots until 2:00 a.m, after they had already started. Stein claims that while they "definitely participated in subsequent developments", it is unlikely that Johnson or Rivera were present at the beginning of the riots.) The riots lasted for six days, resulting in the arrests of 20 people. Although this sit-in was about the rights of queer and trans people, the actual inspiration from sit-ins comes from the idea of taking ownership of spaces that were not designed for certain minorities. For example in this case, Weinstein hall was designed for “formal” uses. However, sit-ins are about occupying spaces and creating space for all, showing the intersectionality of the birth of STAR.

Soon after the riots, gay rights activists founded various organizations, including the Gay Liberation Front (GLF) and the Gay Activists Alliance (GAA). Both Johnson and Rivera were active in the GAA and GLF at different times. In September 1970, the administration at New York University (NYU) canceled several upcoming dances to be held at the Weinstein Hall residential building after learning that they would be "homosexual" events. In response, beginning on September 20, 1970, members of several activist organizations took over the hall, beginning the Weinstein Hall occupation. During this time, Johnson suggested the formation of an organization for transgender people, to be called Street Transvestite Action Revolutionaries (STAR). According to Johnson biographer Tourmaline, the name may have been partially inspired by an album called STAR by the musician Julianne. On September 25, the occupation was broken up by a police tactical unit, prompting the occupiers to leave and march throughout Greenwich Village.

=== Street Transvestites for Gay Power ===
If you want gay power then youre going to have to fight for it. And youre going to have to fight until you win. Because [striked through] once you start youre not going to be able to stop because if you do youll lose everything. You wont just lose this fight, but all the other fights all over the country. All our brothers and sisters all over the world will return to their closets in shame. So if you want to fight for your rights, then fight till the end.

— Sylvia Rivera, excerpt from "GAY POWER—WHEN DO WE WANT IT? OR DO WE?"

Soon after the occupation's end, Rivera published a flyer titled "GAY POWER—WHEN DO WE WANT IT? OR DO WE?" The flyer, published under the alias "Street Transvestites for Gay Power", discussed the Weinstein Hall Occupation, condemned the abuse inflicted on gay people by police, and urged immediate action for gay rights. Some argue that the publication of this flyer represented the founding of a new organization called Street Transvestites for Gay Power. Others, such as Bebe Scarpi, claim that Rivera was "defining herself as a street transvestite gay liberation advocate", not declaring the foundation of a new organization. In either case, a group called Street Transvestites for Gay Power, which included both Johnson and Rivera, later organized protests at NYU's Loeb Student Center and Bellevue Hospital. At NYU, they demanded the creation of a gay community center, open enrollment for gay people, and the right to be openly gay without fear of retaliation. At Bellevue, they demanded an end to psychiatric abuse and compulsory sterilization, as well as free, community-controlled health and dental care. NYU responded by allowing gay dances to take place at Weinstein Hall.

Around this time, Johnson and Rivera also managed a shelter for roughly 20 unhoused transgender youths out of a semi-truck trailer. Both Johnson and Rivera had themselves experienced houselessness, having met each other while hustling as teenagers on 42nd Street. According to Rivera, she and Johnson supported themselves and the shelter by begging and engaging in sex work. They provided meals for the youths who lived at the shelter, assuming a parental role for them. At some point, a group of truck drivers attempted to take the trailer away. Johnson and Rivera vigorously protested, fearing that one or more of the youths was still inside. However, their pleas were ignored, and one of the youths was accidentally taken to California.

== History ==
=== Official formation ===
According to academic Samuel Galen Ng, STAR emerged from Street Transvestites for Gay Power. The first STAR meeting, which was prompted by the incident with the truck drivers, was held in late 1970. Attendees included Johnson, Rivera, Andorra Martin, Bebe Scarpi, Bubbles Rose Lee, and Zazu Nova. Both Lee and Scarpi had previously participated in the Weinstein Hall occupation, Scarpi as a representative of the GAA. Lee had also been one of the youths who lived in the trailer. At the meeting, Rivera nominated Johnson for president of the new organization, but Johnson declined. She instead assumed the role of vice president, while Rivera became president. They also made preparations for the creation of a permanent shelter for unhoused youth, to be called STAR House, with either Scarpi or Lee agreeing to secure a rental from the mafia. (Note: Scarpi according to Duberman and Lee according to Cohen. Per Duberman, Lee was friends with a local mafioso named Michael Umbers.)

On October 30, 1970, STAR participated in a 10,000-person march organized by the Young Lords Party, a predominantly Puerto Rican radical group, to the Headquarters of the United Nations. While the primary purpose of the march was to demand self-determination for Puerto Rican people, the reason for STAR's involvement was to protest police violence. According to Rivera, this was one of STAR's first public appearances.

=== STAR House and early activism ===
Location of STAR House in the East Village, Manhattan

STAR began renting STAR House, which was located at 213 East 2nd Street, in November 1970. The four-bedroom house was in poor condition, with no electricity or heat, inadequate plumbing, and piles of rubble littered across the premises. Andorra, Lee, Rivera, and Bambi L'Amour worked to restore the house together. While the GAA and GLF initially agreed to support their efforts, only one activist, Bob Kohler of the GLF, actually did so. The mafia set rent for the house at $200 (equivalent to roughly $1,600 in 2024), and STAR members used various approaches to raise money. On November 21, 1970, STAR hosted a joint dance with the GLF at Alternate U, a leftist education center in Greenwich Village that commonly hosted GLF events at the time. Rivera collected money at the door. In total, the event raised between $600 and $700 (roughly equivalent to $4,800 and $5,700 in 2024), some of which Rivera kept for personal use. Some members also raised money through begging and sex work.

STAR provided food for its residents: a rotating group of 15 to 25 individuals whom Rivera referred to as her "STAR House kids". The house was decorated with posters advocating for political prisoners, including Angela Davis. There were no membership rolls, as at a formal shelter. Drug use was also common, particularly alcohol, cocaine, heroin, and methadone. STAR members continued to raise money through begging, sex work, and theft, as well as a bake sale. Many residents of the house were Latino and practiced a distinctive form of santería characterized by the veneration of Saint Barbara, who was envisioned as the patron saint of homosexuality, as well as Our Lady of Charity, Saint Michael, and Saint Martha, envisioned as the patron saint of transformation. Rivera set up an altar to Saint Barbara in the house, where residents could pay tribute to her before going out. Johnson also brought several puppies to live there.

While STAR House was active, STAR advocated for prison reform in New York. At Rikers Island, New York City's largest prison, gay youths lived in segregated facilities characterized by unsanitary conditions and abuse, both by prison officers and other inmates. On January 17, 1971, representatives from STAR, the GAA, the GLF, and the Mattachine Society formed the Gay Community Prison Committee to investigate instances of abuse, ensure visitation rights, raise bail money, and potentially sponsor protests. They also worked to raise awareness of the case of Raymond Lavon Moore, who had been killed by prison guards in the Tombs, a men's prison in Manhattan. After receiving death threats for her work on the Moore case, Rivera sought the assistance of the Young Lords, who assigned two members to work as Rivera's bodyguards. According to Tourmaline, several members of STAR considered blowing up the walls of a jail located in Chinatown, Manhattan, to free the inmates there, but decided against it due to the high volume of people.

In March 1971, Johnson's husband was killed while trying to rob an off-duty police officer near STAR House. Johnson and Rivera attended his funeral together, after which Johnson's dog died. The dog had been a gift from her husband, and after its death, Marsha experienced an emotional breakdown. As a result, she was admitted to Wards Island State Hospital. STAR participated in a march to the hospital alongside the GAA, where they held a "candle vigil" in Johnson's honor, as well as to protest the treatment of gays in hospitals and prisons. That same month, it also participated in a march organized by the GAA in Albany, New York, to protest state laws that prohibited loitering, sodomy, and solicitation, as well as to advocate for employment and housing protections. In April 1971, STAR endorsed an open letter written by feminist activist Ti-Grace Atkinson that criticized the Catholic Church for its opposition to abortion, birth control, sexual law reform, and, according to Atkinson, "human dignity". Sometime in early 1971, STAR also attended the "Conference on Gay Liberation" held at Rutgers University alongside the GAA, the GLF, the Mattachine Society, Daughters of Bilitis, Fight Repression of Erotic Expression (FREE), Radicalesbians, and an organization called Third World Gay Revolution. From 1971 to 1973, STAR was a participant in the Christopher Street Liberation Day rallies to commemorate the anniversary of the Stonewall riots.

Various accounts have been given regarding the end of STAR House in July 1971. According to Rivera, there was a "confrontation" with Michael Umbers, the mafioso who was renting the house to STAR. Historian Martin Duberman reports that during this confrontation, Umbers demanded rent from Rivera, which he claimed had not been paid for three months. Per Duberman, when Rivera asked Lee, who was tasked with paying rent, what had happened, Lee attributed the issue to the cost of repairs. Duberman then claims that Umbers arrived and threatened to kill Lee if rent was not paid, prompting Rivera to threaten to involve the police, and that after a heated exchange, Umbers left. After that, Duberman claims that Lee left the city. However, according to Kohler, no such confrontation occurred. In either case, at some point, Rivera asked the GAA for a loan to keep the house open, but her request was denied. She was instead permitted to leave a box at the GAA offices soliciting donations, but was unable to raise sufficient money to pay the rent. Other members of STAR also attempted to raise money by engaging in sex work in Times Square. Despite their efforts, soon after the confrontation, Umbers evicted the residents of STAR House.

=== New York City Gay Rights Bill ===
After STAR's eviction, its headquarters moved throughout Manhattan, including to an apartment rented by Johnson on Eldridge Street and to various hotel rooms on 12th Street. Its focus shifted towards achieving recognition for transgender individuals within the gay liberation movement and society at large. STAR members participated in discussions regarding the New York City Gay Rights Bill, which the GAA had introduced in September 1970. The purpose of the bill was to provide protections against sexual orientation discrimination. At the first public hearing on the bill on October 18, 1971, several members of STAR criticized it for providing what they saw as inadequate protections for transgender individuals.

At the second hearing on November 15, 1971, a group of gay men successfully prevented police officers from removing transgender attendees. Subsequently, after a contentious exchange between a city councilor and a transgender attendee named June Bartel, a tactical unit was deployed. However, after Scarpi and several other members of STAR confronted them, the police withdrew. Scarpi then testified, rebutting common arguments against the inclusion of transgender people in public life and discussing various problems faced by the transgender community

At the third hearing, which was held on December 17, 1971, transgender attendees were barred from using the facility's restrooms. However, gay power advocates blocked the police from making any arrests. Rivera read a statement concerning the physical abuse and housing discrimination faced by transgender people. The bathroom ban proved controversial within the gay community, with the newspaper Come Out! criticizing the ban, while the New York Mattachine Times criticized the transgender attendees for what they saw as "misguided" bathroom use. The bill was defeated in January 1970, but a similar bill without protections for transgender people was passed in 1986. In 2002, the bill was amended to incorporate transgender rights.

=== Decline ===
You all tell me, go and hide my tail between my legs. I will no longer put up with this shit. I have been beaten. I have had my nose broken. I have been thrown in jail. I have lost my job. I have lost my apartment for gay liberation, and you all treat me this way? What the fuck's wrong with you all? Think about that!

— Sylvia Rivera, speech at the 1973 Christopher Street Liberation Day rally (Note: This quote is presented in the source with line breaks between sentences. For legibility, they have been removed here.)

Throughout 1972, STAR stopped holding meetings and saw a decline in demonstrations. In July 1972, Rivera was arrested for carrying a knife for use in self-defense, spending several weeks at Rikers Island. While there, she instigated various acts of sabotage, such as flooding toilets and setting mattresses on fire, in protest of the harsh conditions faced by prisoners. She was arrested again in April 1973 during a protest following the third defeat of the New York City Gay Rights Bill and once again at another protest several days later, during which she scaled New York City Hall.

According to Rivera, the 1973 Christopher Street Liberation Day rally marked the death of STAR. The gay liberation movement had fragmented by that point, with the National Gay Task Force advocating for incremental reforms while many lesbians embraced separatism. The organization Lesbian Feminist Liberation (LFL) was particularly opposed to transgender individuals speaking at the parade, distributing flyers that referred to transgender women as "female impersonators". STAR was initially slated to march at the front of the parade, but they were ultimately prevented from marching at all. A STAR banner was also removed from the rally's bandstand. Angered, and despite attempts by some gay activists to remove her, Rivera took the stage in tears, criticizing the attendees for excluding transgender people from their activism despite their many contributions to the struggle for LGBTQ rights. She then led a chant for "gay power".

After Rivera's speech, Jean O'Leary of LFL spoke, accusing Rivera of being a "genital male" and criticizing drag entertainment as demeaning and misogynistic. (Note: According to Cohen, O'Leary later "expressed regret for maintaining a rigid politically correct anti-drag stance".) She was booed by the audience. After O'Leary's address, Lee Brewster of the Queens Liberation Front spoke, criticizing lesbians who sought to exclude transgender individuals from the gay liberation movement. After the rally, Johnson sought out Rivera, who had returned to her apartment and slit her wrists in the bathroom. Johnson promptly called an ambulance. Rivera was taken to Bellevue, where she met with Johnson and Kohler that evening. Soon after, she retired from public activism for many years.

The 1973 rally was part of a larger discussion. S.T.A.R. began to experience tension within the gay liberation movement over whose needs and identities the movement itself represented. A big part of the gay liberation movement consisted of transgender activists who contributed to organizing and participating in these movements, yet they often did not receive equal treatment within the movement. Scholar Roderick A. Ferguson discusses Rivera’s recollections of the movement and how undervalued transgender activists were as a whole. Transgender activists were only valued by the gay liberation movement when they took risks in protests, worked on the front lines, or brought in different struggles involving oppression, racism, and poverty. At the same time, their transgender expression was rejected, and they were not seen as equals within the movement. The gay liberation movement focused on a narrower set of gay rights that excluded people within the movement, even though they were equally involved in the fight.

=== Revival ===
Rivera revived STAR as "Street Transgender Action Revolutionaries" after the murder of Amanda Milan in Times Square on June 20, 2000. She and Kohler organized a demonstration before the trials of the three men involved in Milan's murder. (Note: According to Nina Siegal, writing for Salon, there were three simultaneous trials: one for her murderer, Dwayne McCuller, one for Eugene Celestine, who supplied McCuller with the knife used to kill Milan, and one for David Anderson, who was accused of helping McCuller evade police capture after the killing.) The crowd met at Sheridan Square, where they called for "justice for Amanda". According to Dareh Gregorian, writing for the New York Post, Milan's killer, Dwayne McCuller, pleaded guilty and was sentenced to 17 and a half years in prison. Later, in early 2001, STAR, along with several other groups, organized a picket outside a local club after it dismissed a transgender dancer, resulting in the club's closure. The revived STAR disbanded after Rivera's death from liver cancer in 2002.

== Ideology ==
STAR's platform, which was probably published sometime in 1971 according to academic Stephan Cohen, criticizes the "oppression against Transvestites of either sex", which it claims is a result of sexism. In its first point, it calls for bodily autonomy for transgender people. In subsequent points, it calls for the end of job discrimination, police harassment, and medical abuse against transgender people, as well as for free clothing, education, food, healthcare, housing, and transportation. It concludes by calling for equal rights for transgender and "gay street people", an end to the "exploitation and discrimination" against transgender people in the gay community, and the establishment of a "revolutionary peoples' government". According to Cohen, STAR's platform was influenced by both the GLF's "revolutionary anti-capitalist" politics and the GAA's demands for free expression and employment protections. Meanwhile, Ng traces STAR's ideological roots, particularly its call for a "revolutionary peoples' government", to Maoism, as well as the Ten-Point Program of the Black Panther Party.

== Legacy ==
STAR has inspired other transgender activists over time. In 1995, Rusty Mae Moore and Chelsea Goodwin, inspired by STAR House, created a community living space called Transy House, where Rivera lived from 1997 until her death in 2002. In 2013, Untorelli Press published Street Transvestite Action Revolutionaries: Survival, Revolt, and Queer Antagonist Struggle. Much of the archival material presented in the book was allegedly uncovered by activist and historian Tourmaline and used without her consent. Since 2019, the Museum of the City of New York has shown an exhibit titled "When Existence is Resistance", which features STAR as its primary focus. STAR's activities are also covered in the fourth episode of the 2020 documentary series Equal, produced by HBO.

=== Historiography ===
Various sources have discussed STAR's historical impact. Academic Benjamin Shepard refers to STAR as "[America]'s first trans political organization". Cohen argues that STAR lent the struggle for transgender rights political legitimacy. Per Cohen, STAR "enacted themes of survival, family, communal interdependence, and gay power", demonstrating what gay liberation might look like in practice and anticipating later developments in queer theory by rejecting the conflation between biological sex and gender. Academic Abam J. Lewis similarly argues that the STAR platforms prefigured later efforts by transgender activists regarding gender-affirming medical care and ID documents. Meanwhile, Ng places STAR House within the context of the LGBTQ "house" culture, where transgender youth of color were provided with safe spaces to eat and sleep. Tourmaline, along with academics Eric A. Stanley and art historian Johanna Burton, posit that STAR addressed issues that were generally overlooked by the mainstream gay rights movement, which was primarily white and middle-class.

Scholars also discuss the similarities between STAR and other contemporary political organizations. Ng discusses the "popular front" alliance formed by the Black Panthers with gay liberation organizations like STAR and the GLF. Specifically, he compares STAR's activism and the Black Panthers', observing that they both called for political revolution on behalf of oppressed people as a whole while simultaneously working to meet their community's specific material needs—food and shelter, in STAR's case. Academic Abram J. Lewis similarly notes STAR's connections to other contemporary organizations, including the Black Panthers, the Young Lords, and the various communist parties active in the United States.

== See also ==
- LGBT culture in New York City
- LGBT history
- LGBT rights in the United States
- List of LGBT rights organizations
- Transgender culture of New York City

== Sources ==
- Carter, David (2010). Stonewall: The Riots That Sparked the Gay Revolution. New York: Macmillan. ISBN 978-0-312-67193-8.
- Carter, David (2019). "Exploding the Myths of Stonewall". Gay City News.
- Chauncey, George (1994). Gay New York: Gender, Urban Culture, and the Making of the Gay Male World, 1890-1940. New York: Basic Books. ISBN 0-465-02633-8.
- Cohen, Stephan (2008). The Gay Liberation Youth Movement in New York: 'An Army of Lovers Cannot Fail'. New York; London: Routledge. ISBN 978-0-203-94057-0.
- Cohen, Stephan (2021). "STAR". In Goldberg, Abbie E.; Beemyn, Genny (eds.). The SAGE Encyclopedia of Trans Studies. Vol. 2. Thousand Oaks: SAGE. pp. 799–801. ISBN 978-1-5443-9381-0.
- Davis, Amanda (2017). "Transy House". NYC LGBT Historic Sites Project.
- Duberman, Martin B. (1994). Stonewall. New York: Open Road Media. ISBN 978-1-480-42384-8.
- Fernández, Johanna (2020). The Young Lords: A Radical History. Chapel Hill: University of North Carolina Press. ISBN 978-1-4696-5345-7.
- Fernández, Lilia (2018). "Founding of the Young Lords, 1968-1972". In Fernández, Lilia (ed.). 50 Events That Shaped Latino History: An Encyclopedia of the American Mosaic. Vol. 2. Santa Barbara: ABC-CLIO. pp. 625–641.
- Gilchrist, Tracy E. (2020). "See Cheyenne Jackson, Samira Wiley as LGBTQ+ Icons in HBO Max's EQUAL". Advocate.com.
- Gossett, Reina; Stanley, Eric A.; Burton, Johanna (2017). "Known Unknowns: An Introduction to Trap Door". In Gossett, Reina; Stanley, Eric A.; Burton, Johanna (eds.). Trap Door: Trans Cultural Production and the Politics of Visibility. Cambridge: MIT Press. ISBN 978-0-262-03660-3.
- Greene-Hayes, Ahmad (2024). "Street Evangelists and Transgender Saints". QTR: A Journal of Trans and Queer Studies in Religion. 1 (1). Duke University Press: 32–52. doi:10.1215/29944724-11208911. ISSN 2994-4724.
- Gregorian, Dareh (2002). "BX. MAN GUILTY IN SLAYING OF TRANSSEXUAL". New York Post.
- Johnson, Marsha P.; Wicker, Randy (1989). "Marsha P. Johnson & Randy Wicker". Making Gay History (Interview). Interviewed by Marcus, Eric. NOTE: This interview was presented as part of the Making Gay History podcast.
- Keller, Monica; Morris, Jessica (2021). "Johnson, Marsha P.". In Goldberg, Abbie E.; Beemyn, Genny (eds.). The SAGE Encyclopedia of Trans Studies. Vol. 2. Thousand Oaks: SAGE. pp. 466–467. ISBN 978-1-5443-9381-0.
- Lewis, Abram J. (2017). "Trans History in a Moment of Danger: Organizing in and Beyond 'Visibility' in the 1970s". In Gossett, Reina; Stanley, Eric A.; Burton, Johanna (eds.). Trap Door: Trans Cultural Production and the Politics of Visibility. Cambridge: MIT Press. ISBN 978-0-262-03660-3.
- Negrón-Muntaner, Frances (2015). "The Look of Sovereignty: Style and Politics in the Young Lords". Centro Journal. 27 (1): 4–33. ProQuest 1704739824.
- Ng, Samuel Galen (2013). "Trans Power! Sylvia Lee Rivera's STAR and the Black Panther Party". Left History. 17 (1). doi:10.25071/1913-9632.39213. ISSN 1913-9632.
- Rivera, Sylvia (1970). "GAY POWER: WHEN DO WE WANT IT? OR DO WE?". Marsha: The Joy and Defiance of Marsha P. Johnson. By Tourmaline. New York: Tiny Reparations Books. ISBN 978-0-59318-568-1.
- Rivera, Sylvia (1973). "Y'all Better Quiet Down". Street Transvestite Action Revolutionaries: Survival, Revolt, and Queer Antagonist Struggle. Untorelli Press. pp. 30–31.
  NOTE: This book is primarily a collection of primary source documents. No editor is credited, but activist and historian Tourmaline claims to have uncovered much of the archival material. See "Street Evangelists and Transgender Saints: Sylvia Rivera, Marsha P. Johnson, and the Religions of the Afro-Americas" by Ahmad Greene-Hayes, p. 46.
- Rivera, Sylvia (2002). "Queens in Exile, the Forgotten Ones". In Nestle, Joan; Howell, Clare; Wilchins, Riki Anne (eds.). GenderQueer: Voices From Beyond the Sexual Binary. Los Angeles; New York: Alyson Books. pp. 67–85. ISBN 978-1-55583-730-3.
- Roth, Michael P. (2006). "Rikers Island". Prisons and Prison Systems: A Global Encyclopedia. Westport; London: Greenwood. pp. 226–227. ISBN 0-313-32856-0.
- Seidman, Sarah (2019). "When Existence is Resistance". Museum of the City of New York.
- Shepard, Benjamin (2002). "Amanda Milan and the rebirth of the Street Trans Action Revolutionaries". In Shepard, Ronald; Hayduk, Ronald (eds.). From ACT UP to the WTO: Urban Protest and Community Building in the Era of Globalization. London: Verso. ISBN 1-85984-653-X.
- Shockley, Jay (2023). "Gay Liberation Front at Alternate U." NYC LGBT Historic Sites Project.
- Siegal, Nina (2001). "The crying game". Salon. Archived from the original on January 11, 2012.
- Stein, Marc (2021). "Stonewall Riots". In Goldberg, Abbie E.; Beemyn, Genny (eds.). The SAGE Encyclopedia of Trans Studies. Vol. 2. Thousand Oaks: SAGE. pp. 802–806. ISBN 978-1-5443-9381-0.
- Stryker, Susan (2017). Transgender History. Berkeley: Seal Press. ISBN 978-1-58005-690-8.
- "Sylvia Rivera and Marsha P. Johnson: Listen to the Newly Unearthed Interview with Street Transvestite Action Revolutionaries". The New York Historical. 2019.
- Tourmaline (2025). Marsha: The Joy and Defiance of Marsha P. Johnson. New York: Tiny Reparations Books. ISBN 978-0-59318-568-1.
- Wanzer-Serrano, Darrel (2015). The New York Young Lords and the Struggle for Liberation. Philadelphia: Temple University Press. ISBN 978-1-4399-1204-1.
- "When Existence is Resistance". Museum of the City of New York. Archived from the original on June 5, 2025.
- White, Heather R. (2024). "Coming Out in the Parish Hall: New York's Gay Movement and the Church of the Holy Apostles, 1969–70". QTR. 1 (2). Duke University Press: 149–170. doi:10.1215/29944724-11365529. ISSN 2994-4724.
