= TS =

TS or Ts may refer to:

== Businesses and organizations ==
- Air Transat (IATA code TS), a Canadian airline
- Tenaris (NYSE symbol), a global manufacturer of steel pipe products
- Theosophical Society, religious philosophy
- Tidewater Southern Railway (reporting mark TS), a former US railroad
- Trabzonspor, a Turkish Football Club
- Transcendental Students, a former radical student group at NYU
- TS Ferries, an Estonian ferry line

== Linguistics ==
- Ts (digraph), a digraph in the Latin alphabet
- Voiceless alveolar sibilant affricate (⟨t͡s⟩, ⟨t͜s⟩, or ⟨ʦ⟩), a type of consonantal sound
  - Tse (Cyrillic) (Ц ц), the Cyrillic letter representing the voiceless alveolar affricate
- Tsonga language (ISO 639 code: ts), of southern Africa

== Science and technology ==
- Tensile strength, in materials science
- Terasecond, symbol Ts, =10^{12} seconds

=== Biology and medicine ===
- Transverse section, a term used in microscopy when prepared slide has a sample transversely dissected.
- Thymidylate synthase, the enzyme used to generate thymidine monophosphate
- Tourette syndrome, a neurological condition involving involuntary tics
- Turner syndrome, a condition in which a female is partly or completely missing an X chromosome

=== Chemistry ===
- Tennessine, symbol Ts, a chemical element
- Tosyl, a group in organic chemistry
- Transition state, of a chemical reaction

=== Electronics and computing ===
- Adobe Technical Communication Suite, an Adobe software family
- MPEG transport stream (file extension .ts), a digital media container format
- Telesync, a bootleg recording of a film recorded in a movie theater
- Terminal Services, a component of Microsoft Windows operating systems
- Tip-Sleeve, a standard monaural phone connector
- TypeScript (file extension .ts), a Microsoft programming language

=== Mathematics ===
- Tabu search, a search method
- Tate–Shafarevich group, in arithmetic geometry
- Transition system, a directed graph model

== Transportation ==
- Twin Spark, an Alfa Romeo car engine technology
- Turbine Steamship (ship prefix)
- Turn and slip indicator, an avionics instrument
- Training Ship (ship prefix)
- Telangana State (vehicle registration code TS), India
- Tunisia (aircraft registration prefix TS)
- Tobu Skytree Line, Kameido Line, and Daishi Line (railway line prefix TS)

== Other uses ==
- Teaspoon (ts.), a measure in cooking
- ISO Technical Specification, e.g. ISO/TS 16949:2009
- Top Secret, a security classification
- TeamSpeak, a proprietary voice-over-Internet Protocol application for audio communication
- TS postcode area, UK
- Transition School, a one-year program at the University of Washington; see Transition School and Early Entrance Program

== See also ==
- T&S (disambiguation)
- Models of Ibanez Tube Screamer guitar overdrive pedal, e.g. TS7
