= Rusty Mae Moore =

American transgender rights activist and educator (1941–2022)

- Born: October 25, 1941; Sewickley, Pennsylvania
- Died: February 23, 2022 (aged 80); Pine Hill, New York
- Occupations: Business professor and trans activist
- Known for: Operating the Transy House

Rusty Mae Moore (October 25, 1941 – February 23, 2022) was an American transgender rights activist and educator. She ran a de facto homeless shelter for transgender people in the 1990s and 2000s, known as the Transy House. One such resident was Sylvia Rivera, one of the most prominent voices in trans and queer activism, who lived at Transy House until her death in 2002.

== Early life ==
Moore was born on October 25, 1941, in Sewickley, Pennsylvania (near Pittsburgh), and she grew up in nearby Aliquippa. She transferred to West Nottingham Academy in her junior year of high school where she would become class valedictorian.

In 1963, she married Nancy Voigt, and in 1970 they had a daughter, Jonica Melanie Moore, in São Paulo, Brazil; the couple later divorced. In 1978, Moore married Sara Lee Zug; that same year they had a daughter, Amanda Lee Zug Moore, and in 1983 a son, Colin McGeorge Zug-Moore. Moore and Zug separated then divorced in the early 1990s; she subsequently came out as transgender to her family. Moore then met her partner Chelsea Goodwin, a meeting she described as "love at first sight" in an interview with the Transgender Oral History Project. She would live and work with Goodwin for the rest of her life.

== Academic career ==
Moore attended Northwestern University in the late 1950s, where she majored in business and minored in Russian studies. She received her doctoral degree from the Fletcher School of Law and Diplomacy in 1969. Afterwards, she taught a semester at Arizona State University and then got a position as a business professor at the University of Texas at Austin. She then got a job as a business professor at New York University in 1974.

In 1979, Moore began teaching at Hofstra University. She was a fellow at the Federal University of Rio de Janeiro from 1986-87, and taught several semesters in Russia and the Netherlands.

== Transy House ==
In 1994, Moore and Goodwin purchased the Park Slope rowhouse that would later become the Transy House, a unofficial shelter for homeless queer and trans people. Government shelters in New York often discriminated against transgender people, so social workers often brought trans people in need directly to The Transy House. The house was modeled on the STAR house run by Sylvia Rivera and Marsha P. Johnson in the 1970s. Notable residents of the Transy House include activists Sylvia Rivera and Mariah Lopez.

Moore and Goodwin would close Transy House in 2008 due to Moore's upcoming retirement. The story of Transy House was the subject of a short film titled Changing House, the thesis film of Zavé Martohardjono.

== Later life ==
Moore retired from teaching in 2011 and opened Pine Hill Books, a sci-fi and horror focused bookstore in Pine Hill, New York, with Goodwin. The pair were featured in the Netflix documentary The Death and Life of Marsha P. Johnson.

Moore died as a result of cardiovascular complications due to advanced Alzheimer's disease on February 23, 2022, in Pine Hill, New York.
