= Bob Kohler =

American gay rights activist (1926–2007)

- Born: May 17, 1926; Queens, New York
- Died: December 5, 2007 (aged 81); West Village, New York City
- Known for: LGBT rights activism

Robert Andrew "Bob" Kohler (17 May 1926 – 5 December 2007) was a gay rights pioneer. Born and raised in Queens, New York, Kohler was a lifelong activist in New York City. He was at the Stonewall riots, and was a friend to many of the activists in groups like the Gay Liberation Front and Street Transvestite Action Revolutionaries.

== Life ==
Kohler served in the U.S. Navy in the South Pacific Theater during World War II, but after being wounded in the military, Kohler began working in the entertainment industry. He worked as a CBS-TV producer before owning and operating his own talent agency, The Bob Kohler Agency, which was notable for representing a number of black actors throughout the 1960s. In December of 1967, United Talent Agency acquired Kohler’s agency to add to the firm’s expansion plan where Kohler became VP in charge of talent (actors, directors, composers for musicals).

Throughout the 1970s, Kohler was the manager of the New York gay bathhouse, Club Baths, located in the East Village. He also owned and ran the popular gay store The Loft on Christopher Street.

== Activism ==
Kohler was on the front lines during the Stonewall rebellion of 1969, which was widely regarded as the demonstration against the police which served as a new beginning for the gays rights movement in the United States. Many who knew Kohler said that he emerged from the Stonewall uprising as a leader and militant activist in the gay community. Being active in political protests and demonstrations, he was arrested approximately thirty times and successfully sued the City of New York over these arrests on more than one occasion.

In 1969, Kohler also met and became best friends with activist Sylvia Rivera. Their friendship spanned decades and when needed, Kohler helped her with money and places to stay.

Kohler was also an ally and friend to many homeless LGBT youth, many of which congregated at Christopher Park. He would walk his schnauzer named Magoo through the park and listen to the stories of the gay street youths, often giving them small amounts of money to buy food.

He continued his work with the homeless, namely those living with HIV/AIDS. This work included an 18 month period where he would wait outside of the Division of AIDS Services and Income Support (DASIS) office each evening to make certain that no one was turned away without shelter.

Kohler remained an activist and organizer well into his 70s. In 1999, at the age of 72, Kohler was one of the demonstrators seized in a mass arrest outside of 1 Police Plaza after the killing of Amadou Diallo, an unarmed African immigrant shot 41 times by the police.

Kohler belonged to several activist groups and was one of the founders of the Gay Liberation Front, where he wrote for their newsletter Come Out!. He was active with many movements and groups, including the Congress of Racial Equality (CORE), the Student Nonviolent Coordinating Committee (SNCC), the Black Panther Party, Act Up, Sex Panic!, the Neutral Zone, the New York City AIDS Housing Network (NYCAHN), Irish Queers, Fed Up Queers, animal rights groups, and FIERCE!

== Death ==
Kohler died of lung cancer on December 5, 2007, at the age of 81, in the Charles Street (West Village) apartment that he had lived in for 45 years.

After Kohler died in 2007, his friends, colleagues, and admirers took to the streets of the West Village to honor his lifelong commitment to gay activism. They walked down West 13th Street, Seventh Avenue and Christopher Street to Sheridan Square, and ended at the Hudson River piers. Some mourners chanted “Wash Your Ass” during the street memorial rally as homage to Kohler’s singular piece of advice to patrons of his 1970s-era bathhouse. Friends of Kohler’s honored him by placing his ashes in front of his old store The Loft and spreading the rest in the Hudson River.
