= Fed Up Queers =

U.S. queer activist direct action group

Fed Up Queers, or FUQ, was a queer activist direct action group that began in New York City. The group was made up mostly of lesbians such as Jennifer Flynn (who later co-founded the New York City AIDS Housing Network as well as Health GAP), though notable participants also included gay rights pioneer and Stonewall riots veteran Bob Kohler, and writer Mattilda Bernstein Sycamore. The activists who formed FUQ came together loosely for a few actions in 1998, but the first action attributed to Fed Up Queers was on World AIDS Day, December 1, 1998, when they visited New York State Assemblywoman Nettie Mayersohn's house in Queens at midnight to protest her stance on names reporting.

The group grew out of the AIDS Coalition to Unleash Power (Act Up), Sex Panic!, and the October 19th Coalition. As co-founder Mattilda Bernstein Sycamore wrote, after the success of the political funeral for Matthew Shepard,

we tried to create a large-scale radical queer activist group, but we got stuck in endless process and the meetings got smaller and smaller, [so] some of us formed an affinity group called Fed Up Queers to do smaller, targeted actions. ... Originally the idea was that we would only meet when someone had an idea for an action, we wouldn't get bogged down in process, but then we mostly went from one action to the next, since someone always had an idea.

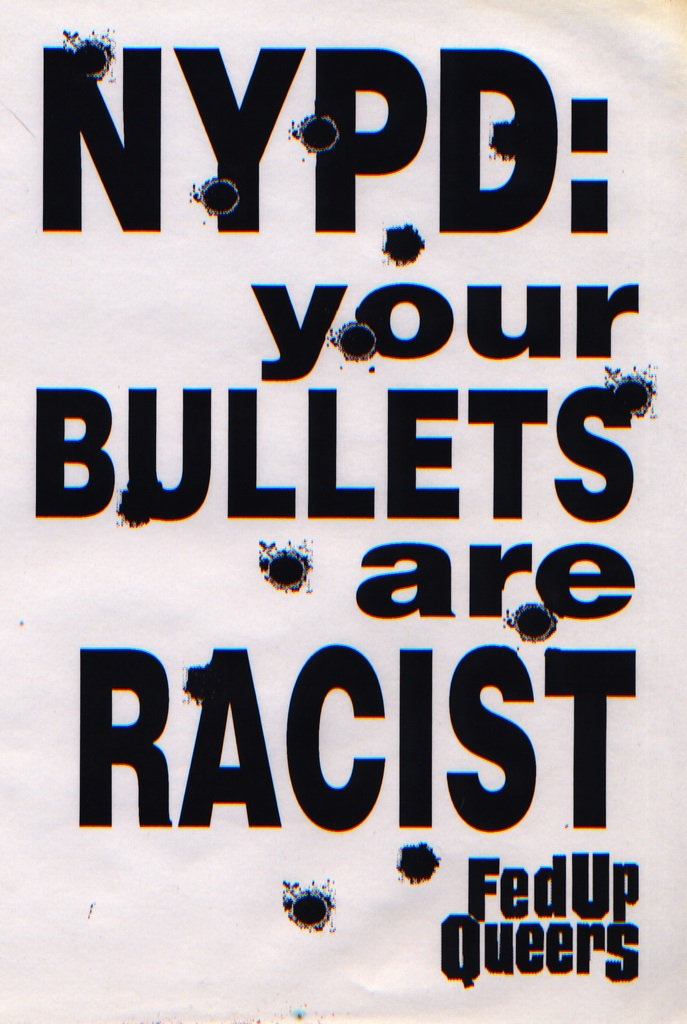
Sticker created after the murder of Amadou Diallo

Fed Up Queers held political funerals for murdered transgender and queer people, and fought restrictive AIDS policies, but focused much of their work on then mayor Rudy Giuliani and the New York City Police Department (NYPD). Fed Up Queers gained notoriety in the media for three actions:

They were the first of the more than 1,200 people arrested protesting the murder of Amadou Diallo by NYPD officers. As one participant wrote, there had already been "protests, but no one was getting arrested and we wanted to raise the stakes. We wanted to block the Brooklyn Bridge, but we only had eight people who could risk arrest, so we said okay, we'll block the bridge with eight people. That's how desperate and angry and empowered we felt." Arrestees eventually included Al Sharpton, Jesse Jackson, former mayor David Dinkins, and actors Susan Sarandon, Ruby Dee, Ossie Davis, and Dick Gregory.

Later, Fed Up Queers stormed Giuliani's keynote speech to the Log Cabin Republicans at the Roosevelt Hotel in Manhattan. This action made the news because security guards beat and bloodied several activists, and clips of both the beatings and Giuliani making a joke about "his activists" played on all city television stations. The activists won a civil suit against the hotel, and were represented by well known radical lawyer Susan Tipograph.

Fed Up Queers, with the support of Act Up and Health GAP, disrupted kick-off events of Vice President Al Gore's Presidential campaign in three cities, denouncing his role in the threat of trade sanctions against Nelson Mandela's South Africa if it did not repeal the Medicines Act. Ultimately, pressure from Jesse Jackson and activists resulted in the United States adjusting its trade policies to enable poor countries, such as South Africa, to gain access to essential medicines.

The group lasted two and half years. Some claim the group disbanded due to tactical disagreements. Others claim the breakup was due to one activist pushing his agenda of cross-generational sex. Various members of the group continued to stage actions using the name, or occasionally reuniting in response to particular events.

A new group called Fed Up Queers formed in 2009, in Arkansas.

== Notable actions ==
- Stop the Parade, activists attempted to stop Rudy Giuliani from marching in the Gay Pride Parade by chaining themselves across Fifth Avenue in New York City, June 28, 1998
- Queers Bash Back, march to bring attention to the knife attack of a lesbian in Brooklyn, and murders of gay men and trans people in the city, Brooklyn, NY, September 27, 1998
- Matthew Shepard Political Funeral, New York City, October 19, 1998
- Wake Up for World AIDS Day, midnight "wake up call" to New York State Assemblywoman Nettie Mayersohn's house in Flushing, Queens, NY. December 1, 1998
- Your Bullets are Racist, protesting the NYPD's murder of Amadou Diallo, New York City, February 22, 1999
- Political funeral for Billy Jack Gaither, March 15, 1999
- Gore's Greed Kills, Carthage, TN; New York, NY; Manchester, NH, June–July 1999
- Protesting Rudy Giuliani's keynote speech to the Log Cabin Republicans at the Roosevelt Hotel, August 28, 1999.
- Activists chained themselves to the Christmas tree in Rockefeller Center before it was lit (and were promptly arrested), to protest lighting ceremonies being held on World AIDS Day. December 1, 1999
- Political funeral for Sakia Gunn, July 11, 2003

== Publications ==
- Splayed, a spoof on the straight-owned gay newspaper The Gay Blade, otherwise known as The New York Blade, after it fired one of its employees for their "gay bias" in an article.
