= Gay Liberation Front =

Gay liberation groups in major US, UK, and Canadian cities during the 1960s-70s

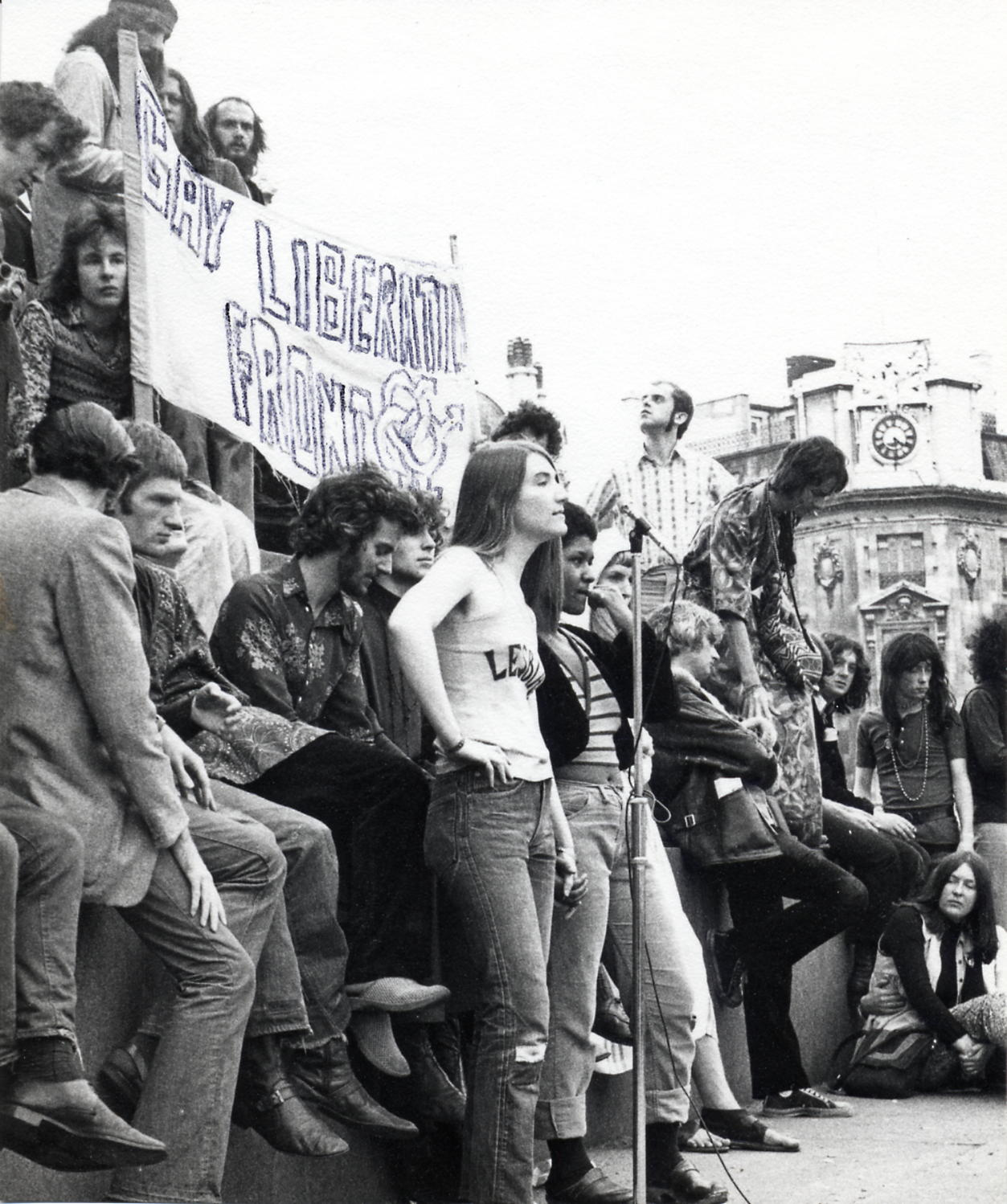
Members of the Gay Liberation Front (GLF) UK, at a demonstration in Trafalgar Square, London in 1971

The Gay Liberation Front (GLF) was the name of several gay liberation groups around the world, the first of which was formed in New York City in 1969, immediately after the Stonewall riots. Similar organizations also formed soon after in the UK, Australia and Canada. The original GLF provided a voice for the newly-out and newly radicalized gay community, and a meeting place for a number of activists who would go on to form other groups, such as the Gay Activists Alliance, Gay Youth New York, and Street Transvestite Action Revolutionaries (STAR) in the US. In the UK and Canada, activists also developed a platform for gay liberation and demonstrated for gay rights. Activists from both the US and UK groups would later go on to found or be active in groups including ACT UP, the Lesbian Avengers, Queer Nation, Sisters of Perpetual Indulgence, and Stonewall.

== United States ==
=== New York City ===
1970s poster used by the US GLF

The United States Gay Liberation Front (GLF) was formed in the aftermath of the Stonewall Riots. The riots are considered by many to be the prime catalyst for the gay liberation movement and the modern fight for LGBTQ rights in the United States.

On June 28, 1969, in Greenwich Village, New York, the New York City police raided the Stonewall Inn, a well known gay bar, located on Christopher Street. Police raids of the Stonewall, and other lesbian and gay bars, were a routine practice at the time, with regular payoffs to dirty cops and organized crime figures an expected part of staying in business. The Stonewall Inn was made up of two former horse stables which had been renovated into one building in 1930. Like all gay bars of the era, it was subject to countless police raids, as LGBTQ activities and fraternization were still largely illegal. But this time, when the police began arresting patrons, the customers began pelting them with coins, and later, bottles and rocks. The lesbian and gay crowd also freed staff members who had been put into police vans, and the outnumbered officers retreated inside the bar. Soon, the Tactical Patrol Force (TPF), originally trained to deal with war protests, were called in to control the mob, which was now using a parking meter as a battering ram. As the patrol force advanced, the crowd did not disperse, but instead doubled back and re-formed behind the riot police, throwing rocks, shouting "Gay Power!", dancing, and taunting their opposition. For the next several nights, the crowd would return in ever increasing numbers, handing out leaflets and rallying themselves. Soon the word "Stonewall" came to represent fighting for equality in the gay community. And in commemoration, Pride marches are held every year on the anniversary of the riots.

In early July 1969, due in large part to the Stonewall riots in June of that year, discussions in the gay community led to the formation of the Gay Liberation Front. According to scholar Henry Abelove, it was named GLF "in a provocative allusion to the Algerian National Liberation Front and the Vietnamese National Liberation Front." On July 31, 1969 the core group of radical activists met again at Alternate U, a leftist meeting hall and lecture center on 6th Ave. at 14th Street. The meeting was attended by over 40 people including Martha Shelley, Marty Robinson, Bill Katzenberg, Lois Hart, Suzanne BeVier, Ron Ballard, Bob Kohler, Marty Stefan, Mark Giles, Charles Pitts, Pete Wilson, Michael Brown, John O’Brien, Earl Galvin, Dan Smith, Jim Fouratt, Billy Weaver, Jerry Hoose, Leo Martello and others. Space usage at Alternate U was arranged with AU staffer, Susan Silverman, who also attended the meeting.

Here, the decision was made to break away from existing gay and lesbian organizations and form the new group to be called the Gay Liberation Front, the name that Martha Shelley “officially” introduced at the meeting. All three words had powerful meanings. “Gay” implied the new radical, out-of-the-closet generation—no longer a quasi-apologetic “homophile group.” “Liberation” implied its broad and radical agenda, a word used at that time by the Women’s, Vietnamese, Black and other freedom movements. “Front” denoted an umbrella coalition uniting a diverse group of lesbian and gay people despite their differences in class, age, gender, race and ethnicity. The meeting then authorized Lois Hart, Michael Brown and Ron Ballard to compose a statement of purpose that appeared in the next issue of “Rat,” a prominent New York radical movement newspaper at that time. From the beginning, GLF stated its goals as confronting all forms of sexism and male supremacy which it held to be the source of LGBT oppression and to form coalitions with other radical groups working to create a world-wide social revolution.

On August 2, 1969, the group held a protest at the Women's House of Detention in Greenwich Village and would go on to hold weekly protests there.

One of GLF's early acts included organizing a march protesting coverage of gay people by The Village Voice, which took place on September 12, 1969. Long before the word "intersectionality" came into use, the GLF had a broad political platform, denouncing racism and declaring support for various Third World struggles and the Black Panther Party. They took an anti-capitalist stance and attacked the nuclear family and traditional gender roles. Continuing its protest on how the media portrayed LGBT people and the movement, GLF picketed the offices of Time Magazine following their publication of a cover story entitled “The Homosexual in America.”

Come Out!, the first periodical published by the GLF, came out it November 1969.

In 1970, several GLF women, such as Martha Shelley, Lois Hart, Karla Jay, and Michela Griffo went on to form the Radicalesbians, a lesbian activist organization. Their first protest was at the National Organization of Women’s Second Congress to Unite Women. The group protested NOW's exclusion of lesbians and lack of support for lesbian issues.

In 1970, members of GLF New York, led by Mark Segal and Nova, formed the group Gay Youth for people under 21 years of age.

In 1970, the drag queen caucus of the GLF, including Marsha P. Johnson and Sylvia Rivera, formed the group Street Transvestite Action Revolutionaries (STAR), during a GLF action, the Weinstein Hall occupation in a protest against NYU policies. STAR focused on providing support for gay prisoners, housing for homeless gay youth and street people, especially other young "street queens".

In 1970, several Black and Latinx members of the GLF, including graphic artist Juan Carlos Vidal and poet Néstor Latrónico, formed Third World Gay Revolution (T.W.G.R.), which attempted to vocalize and combat the triple oppression of heterosexism, racism, and classism experienced by queer people of color. Another chapter of T.W.G.R. opened in Chicago shortly after the original group formed in New York.

In 1970, the GLF, led by Gary Alinder, protested the American Psychiatric Association's classification of homosexuality as a mental disorder.

In 2019, in recognition of GLF New York's historic role in the post-Stonewall LGBTQ movement, and its central role in establishing the annual Pride March, NYC Pride announced that GLF would be one of the Grand Marshal's for the march commemorating the 50th anniversary of the Stonewall Uprising.

=== San Francisco ===
On October 31, 1969, sixty members of the GLF, the Committee for Homosexual Freedom (CHF), and the Gay Guerilla Theatre group staged a protest outside the offices of the San Francisco Examiner in response to a series of news articles disparaging people in San Francisco's gay bars and clubs. The peaceful protest against the Examiner turned tumultuous and was later called "Friday of the Purple Hand" and "Bloody Friday of the Purple Hand". Examiner employees "dumped a barrel of printers' ink on the crowd from the roof of the newspaper building", according to glbtq.com. Some reports state that it was a barrel of ink poured from the roof of the building. The protesters "used the ink to scrawl slogans on the building walls" and slap purple hand prints "throughout downtown [San Francisco]" resulting in "one of the most visible demonstrations of gay power" according to the Bay Area Reporter. According to Larry LittleJohn, then president of Society for Individual Rights, "At that point, the tactical squad arrived – not to get the employees who dumped the ink, but to arrest the demonstrators. Somebody could have been hurt if that ink had gotten into their eyes, but the police were knocking people to the ground." The accounts of police brutality include women being thrown to the ground and protesters' teeth being knocked out. Inspired by Black Hand extortion methods of Camorra gangsters and the Mafia, some gay and lesbian activists attempted to institute "purple hand" as a warning to stop anti-gay attacks, but with little success. In Turkey, the LGBT rights organization MorEl Eskişehir LGBTT Oluşumu (Purple Hand Eskişehir LGBT Formation), also bears the name of this symbol.

In 1970 "The U.S. Mission" had a permit to use a campground in the Sequoia National Forest. Once it was learned that the group was sponsored by the GLF, the Sequoia National Forest supervisor cancelled the permit, and the campground was closed for the period.

=== Detroit ===
In July 1970, members of the Detroit Liberation Front met with activists of the American Library Association's Social Responsibilities Round Table at the association's Detroit convention. They wanted to create a task force for better representation of gay literature and better treatment of gay library patrons and staff. This became the Task Force on Gay Liberation, later named the Rainbow Round Table, which created lists of gay-positive literature, sponsored the annual Stonewall Book Awards, and organized against discrimination over sexual orientation in libraries.

== United Kingdom ==
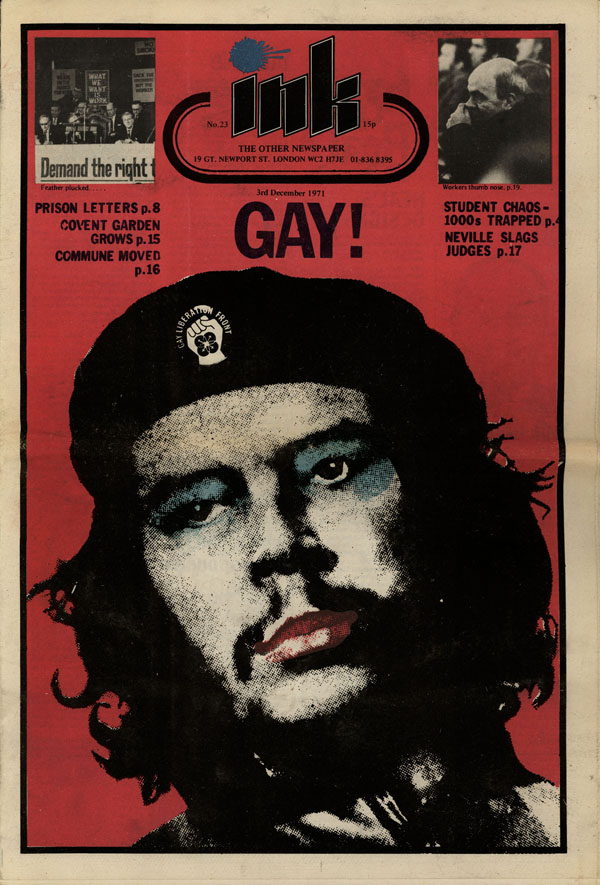
1971 GLF cover version of Ink magazine, UK

... if we are to succeed in transforming our society we must persuade others of the merits of our ideas, and there is no way we can achieve this if we cannot even persuade those most affected by our oppression to join us in fighting for justice.

We do not intend to ask for anything. We intend to stand firm and assert our basic rights. If this involves violence, it will not be we who initiate this, but those who attempt to stand in our way to freedom.

— GLF Manifesto, 1971

The UK Gay Liberation Front existed between 1970 and 1973.

Its first meeting was held in the basement of the London School of Economics on 13 October 1970. Bob Mellors and Aubrey Walter had seen the effect of the GLF in the United States and created a parallel movement based on revolutionary politics. Come Together, the organisation's newspaper, came out of its Media Workshop the same year.

The GLF held its first demonstration on 27 November of the same year, when 150 people marched at Highbury Fields in London in protest at the arrest, and alleged entrapment, of activist Louis Eaks for importuning.

By 1971, the UK GLF was recognized as a political movement in the national press, holding weekly meetings of 200 to 300 people. The GLF Manifesto was published, and a series of high-profile direct actions, were carried out, such as the disruption of the launch of the Church-based morality campaign known as the Nationwide Festival of Light.

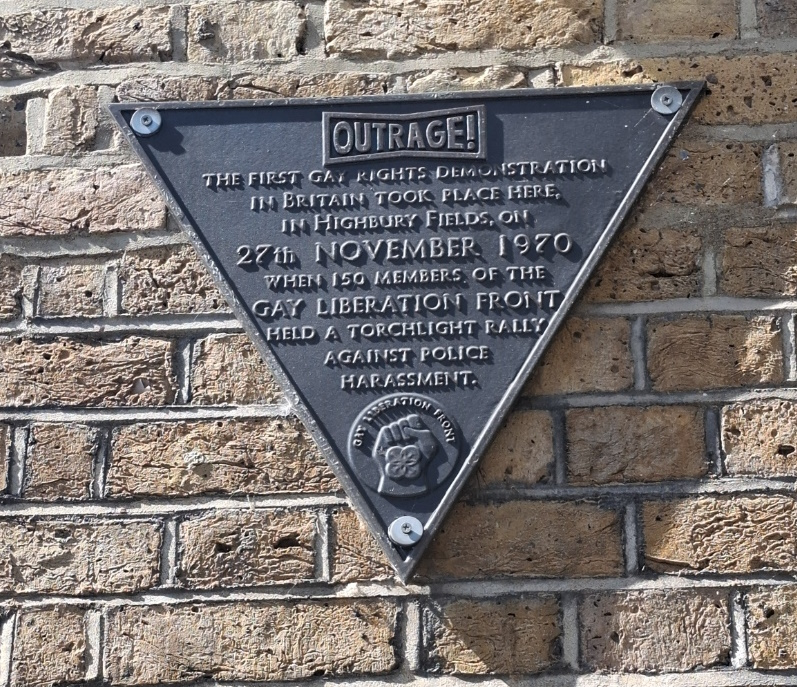
Plaque commemorating first GLF demonstration in London

The disruption of the opening of the 1971 Festival of Light was one of the most well-organised GLF actions. The first meeting of the Festival was organised by Mary Whitehouse at Methodist Central Hall. Amongst GLF members taking part in this protest were the "Radical Feminists", a group of gender non-conforming males in drag, who invaded and spontaneously kissed each other; others released mice, sounded horns, and unveiled banners, and a contingent dressed as workmen obtained access to the basement and shut off the lights.

1971 was also the year Gay Liberation Front's Transvestite, Transsexual and Drag Queen Group was formed. Members of the group, including Rachel Pollack and Roz Kaveney, wrote the 1972 essay "Don't call me mister, you fucking beast", which has been described as Britain's "first trans manifesto". This was published alongside other works in the second women's issue of Come Together, the newspaper of the Gay Liberation Front.

Easter 1972 saw the Gay Lib annual conference held in the Guild of Students building at the University of Birmingham.

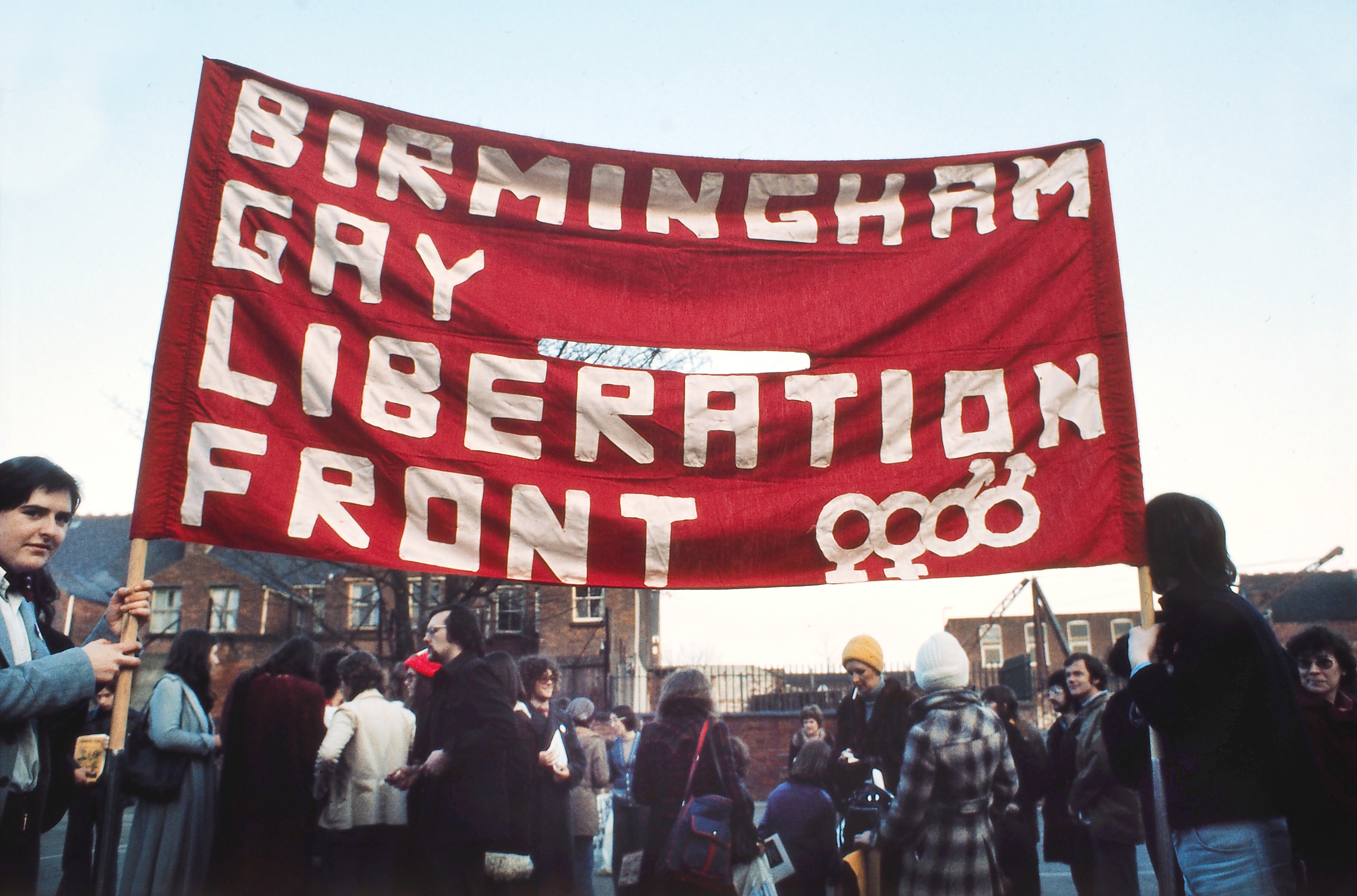
Birmingham GLF marching in Kings Heath / Moseley, Birmingham 1975

By 1974, internal disagreements had led to the movement's splintering. Organizations that spun off from the movement included the London Lesbian and Gay Switchboard, Gay News, and Icebreakers. The GLF Information Service continued for a few further years providing gay related resources. GLF branches had been set up in some provincial British towns (e.g., Birmingham, Bradford, Bristol, Leeds, and Leicester) and some survived for a few years longer. The Leicester Gay Liberation Front founded by Jeff Martin was noted for its involvement in the setting up of the local "Gayline", which is still active today and has received funding from the National Lottery. They also carried out a high-profile campaign against the local paper, the Leicester Mercury, which refused to advertise Gayline's services at the time.

The papers of the GLF are among the Hall-Carpenter Archives at the London School of Economics. Several members of the GLF, including Peter Tatchell, continued campaigning beyond the 1970s under the organisation of OutRage!, which was founded in 1990 and dissolved in 2011, using similar tactics to the GLF (such as "zaps" and performance protest) to attract a significant level of media interest and controversy. It was at this point that a divide emerged within the gay activist movement, mainly due to a difference in ideologies, after which a number of groups including Organization for Lesbian and Gay Alliance (OLGA), Dykes And Faggots Together (DAFT), Stonewall (which focused on lobbying tactics) and OutRage! co-existed.

These groups were very influential following the HIV/AIDS pandemic of the 1980s and 1990s and the violence against lesbians and gay men that followed.

== Canada ==
The first gay liberation groups identifying with the Gay Liberation Front movement in Canada were in Montreal, Quebec. The Front de Libération Homosexuel (FLH) was formed in November 1970, in response to a call for organised activist groups in the city by the publication Mainmise.Another factor in the group's formation was the response from police against gay establishments in the city after the suspension of civil liberties by Prime Minister Pierre Trudeau in the fall of 1970. This group was short-lived; they were disbanded after over forty members were charged for failure to procure a liquor license at one of the group's events in 1972.

A Vancouver, British Columbia group calling itself the Vancouver Gay Liberation Front emerged in 1971, mostly out of meetings from a local commune, called Pink Cheeks. The group gained support from The Georgia Straight, a left-leaning newspaper, and opened a drop-in centre and published a newsletter. The group struggled to maintain a core group of members, and competition from other local groups, such as the Canadian Gay Activists Alliance (CGAA) and the Gay Alliance Toward Equality (GATE), soon led to its demise.

== Denmark ==
Bøssernes Befrielsesfront (BBF; lit. The Gays' Liberation Front) was founded in Copenhagen in 1971, the name inspired by the American Gay Liberation Front. BBF was opposed to the already-established gay rights group "Forbundet af 1948" for being too formal. BBF's activities included going to schools to educate about how it was like being gay, and civil disobedience against the law that prohibited men from publicly dancing together, which was eventually repealed in 1973. The group regularly met at "Bøssehuset" (lit. The gay house) in Christiania.

== New Zealand ==
Women's Liberation and Māori activist Ngahuia Te Awekotuku initiated the foundation of the Auckland Gay Liberation Front in March 1972, alongside fellow University of Auckland students Nigel Baumber, Ray Waru, and others. In the following months Gay Liberation Fronts established in Wellington, Christchurch and Hamilton, with further groups founded in Rotorua, Nelson, Taranaki, and other places between 1973 and 1977. Gay Liberation groups carried out numerous direct action protests, including guerilla theatre performances, zaps, disrupting meetings of anti-gay groups like the Society for the Promotion of Community Standards, and pickets. Supporting the wellbeing of gays and helping them to come out was an early concern of the movement, leading to the formation of counselling services such as Gay-Aid in Wellington and Gays-An in Christchurch. A "Gay Week" was held from 29 May to 3 June 1972, featuring guerrilla theatre, a forum, dance, and teach-in.

Gay Liberation organizations were not always successful in these aims; sexism and transphobia in the movement also led to the establishment of separate lesbian-feminist and trans organizations, such as SHE - Sisters for Homophile Equality - founded in Christchurch in September 1973. Gay Liberation chapters also worked alongside groups such as Hedesthia, a social and political organization for transvestites and transsexuals.

== See also ==
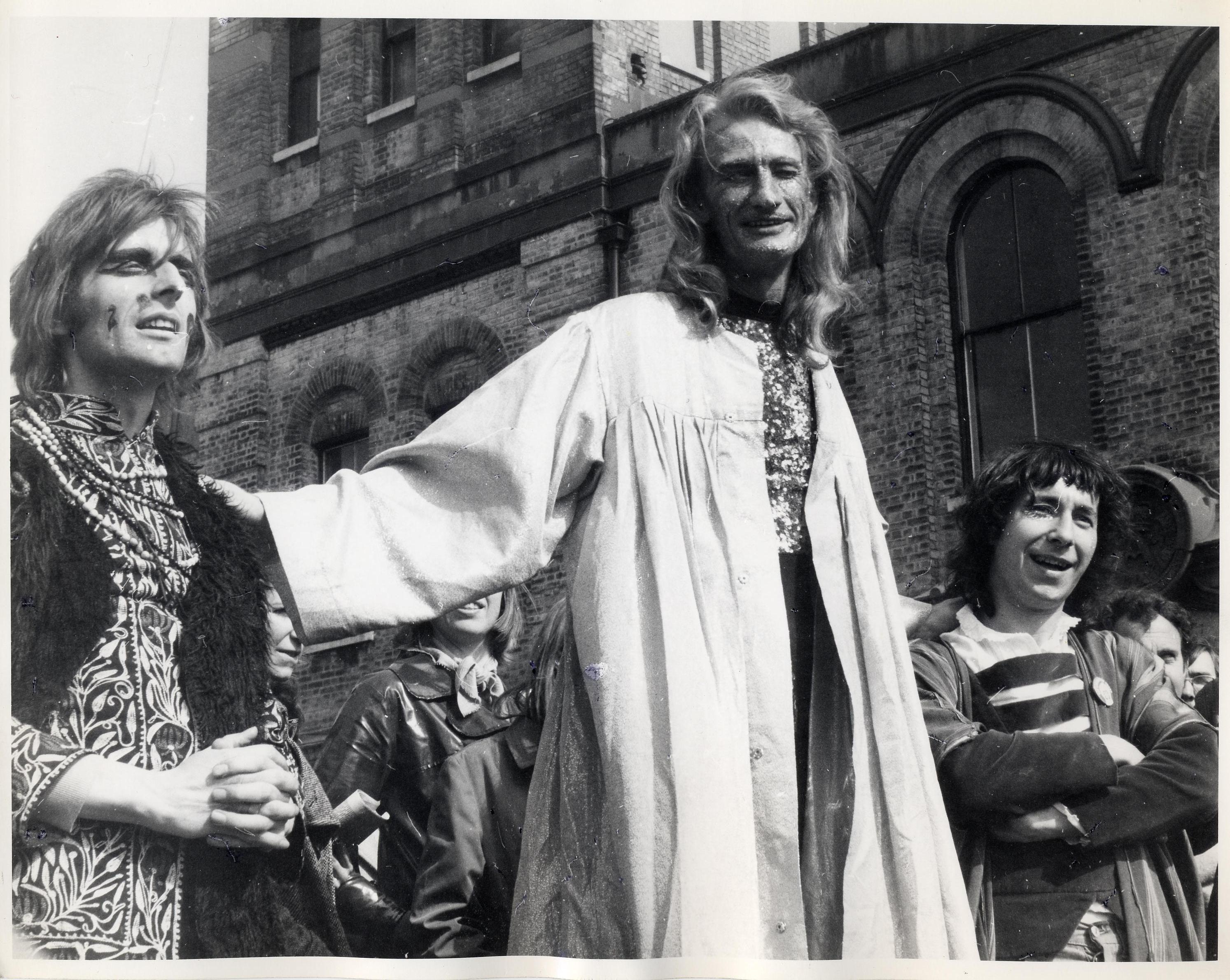
Members of the Gay Liberation Front (GLF) during one of its street theatre performances in London

- Gay Activists Alliance
- Gay Left, UK gay collective and journal
- Hall-Carpenter archives
- List of LGBTQ rights organizations
- Notable members of the GLF in London: Sam Green, Roz Kaveney, Angela Mason, Mary Susan McIntosh, Bob Mellors, Rachel Pollack, Peter Tatchell, Alan Wakeman
- Notable members of the GLF in the USA: Arthur Bell, Arthur Evans, Tom Brougham, Perry Brass, N. A. Diaman, Jim Fouratt, Harry Hay, Brenda Howard, Karla Jay, Marsha P. Johnson, Zazu Nova, Charles Pitts, Sylvia Rivera, Mark Segal, Martha Shelley, Jim Toy, Dan C. Tsang, Allen Young
- Notable members of the GLF in New Zealand: Ngahuia Te Awekotuku, Robin Duff, Peter Wells, Bruce Burnett, Roger Blackley
- OutRage!
- Socialism and LGBT rights
- Stonewall riots
- Stonewall UK
