= Zazu Nova =

Black American transgender activist (born late 1940s, fl. 1965–1970s)

- Nova at a Gay Liberation Front meeting
- Born: Late 1940s Syracuse, New York
- Disappeared: mid 1970s (Note: Nova disappeared in the mid-1970s, shortly after the Gay Liberation Front disbanded.)
- Other names: Nova; Zazu Nova, Queen of Sex
- Occupations: Activist; drag queen; sex worker
- Years active: 1965–1970s
- Organizations: Gay Liberation Front; Gay Youth; Street Transvestite Action Revolutionaries
- Known for: Gay liberation activism

Zazu Nova, often known mononymously as Nova, was an American gay liberation activist and founding member of Gay Youth. A Black queen, (Note: At the time, the term "transgender" was not well known, and "drag queen" was not considered applicable as Nova could not afford drag clothing, but she adopted female affect. In later interviews, Nova's friends referred to her with she/her pronouns.) she moved to New York City as a young adult and worked on Christopher Street as a prostitute, often in drag. She later had a leading role in the Stonewall riots and joined the Gay Liberation Front. In 1970, Nova helped found the New York chapter of Gay Youth to provide support for people too young to participate in the GLF. She disappeared shortly after the GLF disbanded.

== Early life ==
Nova was born in Syracuse, New York, in the late 1940s. She was raised religious and kept her Unitarian beliefs throughout her life. By the time she left Syracuse, Nova had been sent to prison on several occasions for unknown reasons. She moved to New York City in 1965 with dreams of finding success as a playwright on Broadway or at La MaMa Experimental Theatre Club.

In New York City, Nova worked on Christopher Street as a prostitute, often in drag under the name "Zazu Nova, Queen of Sex," and participated in the downtown art scene. At the time, she wore women's clothes as frequently as men's and was known for her platinum afro, long boots, and short miniskirt. Nova soon became friends with queer performers Marsha P. Johnson and Agosto Machado. She later moved to the Upper West Side.

== Activism ==
=== Stonewall riots ===
Although Nova was not in the Stonewall Inn on the first night of the riots, she joined the uprising in the surrounding neighborhoods. David Carter's Stonewall: The Riots That Sparked the Gay Revolution identifies Nova as one of the "three individuals known to have been in the vanguard" of the pushback against the police, alongside Marsha P. Johnson and Jackie Hormona. Several eyewitness accounts also mention her leading role in the uprising. Nova fought alongside Johnson for part of the riot, and at one point the two took a photo together.

=== After Stonewall ===
Nova was active in several gay liberation organizations in the years that followed Stonewall. She joined the Gay Liberation Front (GLF) and was involved in the creation of Street Transvestite Action Revolutionaries (STAR). In 1970, Nova helped found Gay Youth, a group that worked alongside STAR and provided support for people too young to participate in the GLF. She also wrote articles for LGBTQ newspapers and was involved in the first issue of Come Out!.

== Legacy ==
Nova disappeared in the mid-1970s, her friends and fellow activists unsure whether she had died or left New York. Despite never reappearing, she is remembered as one of the people said to have "thrown the first brick" at the Stonewall uprising. Her contributions to the Stonewall riots are often conflated with those of Marsha P. Johnson. There are no known interviews with Nova.

In February 2025, the National Park Service updated their description of Nova from "black transgender woman" to "black woman", likely as a result of Executive Order 14168. This change, as well as additional removals of transgender-related terminology from the webpage, led to significant backlash and protests at the Stonewall National Monument in New York.

== See also ==
- List of people who disappeared mysteriously (1970s)
