= Philadelphia Gay News =

LGBT newspaper in the Philadelphia area

- Type: Weekly LGBT newspaper
- Publisher: Mark Segal
- Editor-in-chief: Jeremy Rodriguez
- Staff writers: Lauren Rowello, Timothy Cwiek
- Founded: 1976
- Language: English
- Headquarters: Philadelphia, Pennsylvania, U.S.
- Circulation: 50,000 weekly
- Website: epgn.com

Philadelphia Gay News (PGN) is an LGBT newspaper in the Philadelphia area. The publication was founded in 1976 by Mark Segal.

PGN is the oldest LGBT publication founded as a weekly publication in the United States. PGN is a member of the National Gay Newspaper Guild.

== History ==
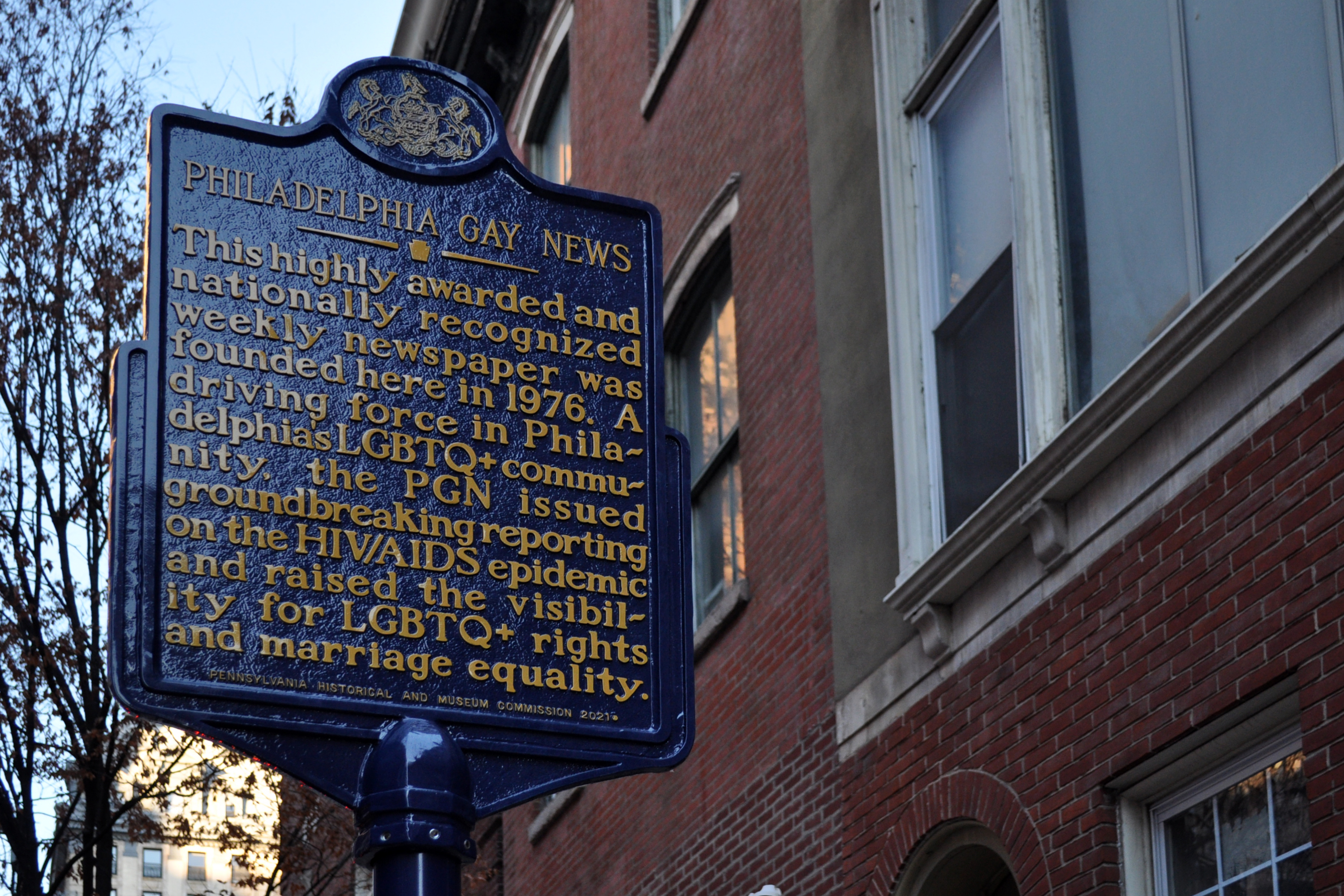
PGN historical marker at 233 South 13th Street

On January 3, 1976, Mark Segal founded PGN. In 1993, the Philadelphia Magazine bestowed Segal with the "Best of Philadelphia" award for "Clout". In 2016, Hillary Clinton wrote an op-ed for PGN, which was the first time a major-party presidential candidate wrote an op-ed for an LGBT newspaper. Four years later, PGN was approved for a commemorative marker from the Pennsylvania Historical and Museum Commission.

== Circulation ==
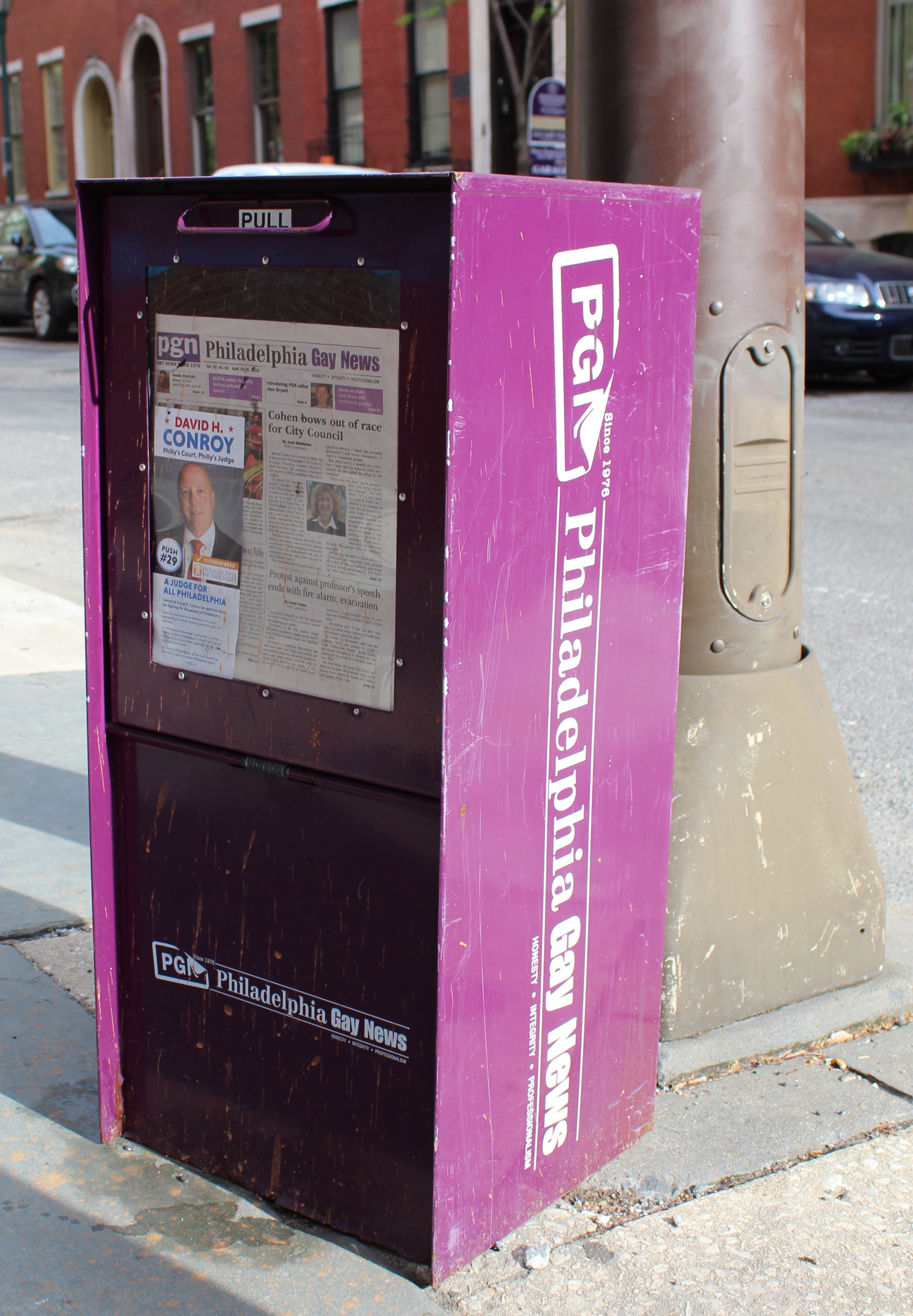
PGN vending machine in 2019

The Philadelphia Gay News is distributed for free and can be picked up in vending boxes throughout Greater Philadelphia, Eastern Pennsylvania, Southern New Jersey and Delaware.

=== Vending machines ===
The Philadelphia Gay News received its batch of around 30 vending boxes in 1976. They were provided for free by the Philadelphia Evening Bulletin, who were retiring an old fleet. PGN's longtime distribution manager, Don Pignolet, took them to Earl Shibe Auto for painting. The shop was willing to donate paint for the boxes, but only one color: fresh plum, or RAL-0007.

"No one else had that color," Pignolet said, "and it just seemed so gay."

Pignolet and his father attached the coin mechanisms to the boxes, initially charging 50 cents an issue. Today the paper is free. Throughout the years the boxes have been used as trash cans and vandalized with stickers and graffiti. People have glued the boxes shut and scrawled homophobic graffiti on them, such as "Gay=Got AIDS Yet?" On several occasions, the boxes were blown up with homemade bombs consisting of M-80 fireworks.
