= NYC LGBT Historic Sites Project =

The NYC LGBT Historic Sites Project is a nonprofit cultural heritage initiative and resource documenting sites that have historic significance to the LGBT+ community in New York City.

== History ==
The NYC LGBT Historic Sites Project is a nonprofit organization that highlights New York City LGBT community’s history in social justice, literature, community, and the arts. It currently lists over 350 locations across the 5 Boroughs of New York City.

The organization is funded in part by the National Park Service Underrepresented Communities Grants, the New York State Office of Parks, Recreation, and Historic Preservation, private, and corporate gifts. The initial report of LGBT history in New York City was prepared for The National Park Service and the New York State Office of Parks, Recreation, and Historic Preservation in 2018.

The resources provided by the project support extending information and appreciation for many overlooked and nearly forgotten sites of historic significance to the LGBT community, as well as promoting tours and visits of them.
