= Mark Segal =

American gay activist (born 1951)

- Born: Mark Allan Segal; January 12, 1951 (age 75); Philadelphia, Pennsylvania, U.S.
- Occupation: Author, Journalist, Gay Rights Activist, Columnist
- Works: And Then I Danced: Traveling the Road to LGBT Equality (2015)
- Spouse(s): Jason Villemez

Mark Allan Segal (born 1951) is an American social activist and author. He participated in the Stonewall riots and was one of the original founders of the Gay Liberation Front where he created its Gay Youth program. He was the founder and former president of the National Gay Newspaper Guild and founded the Philadelphia Gay News. He has won numerous journalism awards for his column "Mark my Works," including best column by The National Newspaper Association, Suburban Newspaper Association and The Society of Professional Journalists.

== Early life and education ==
Segal was born January 1, 1951, in Philadelphia. He is Jewish and originally from the Mount Airy section of Philadelphia. He attended Germantown High School and Temple University.

== Career ==
=== Gay rights activism ===
Segal was a participant at Stonewall in 1969 and help found the Gay Liberation Front that same year. He also founded Gay Youth (GY), an LGBTQ advocacy organization, in 1970. He was also a member of The Christopher Street Gay Liberation Day committee, which organized the first Gay Pride parade in 1970.

In 1972, after being thrown out of a dance competition for dancing with a male lover, Segal crashed the evening news broadcast of WPVI-TV, an act that became known as a "zap" and that he helped popularize. He repeated the action during many other television broadcasts. On 11 December 1973, Segal interrupted Walter Cronkite's broadcast of the CBS Evening News when he ran in front of the camera and held up a yellow sign saying “Gays Protest CBS Prejudice.”

In 1975, he went on a hunger strike on behalf of the passage of a law to guarantee equal rights for homosexuals. In 1976, he founded the Philadelphia Gay News, a LGBT newspaper in the Philadelphia area. The publication was inspired by activist Frank Kameny, whom Segal first met in 1970. In 1988, Segal had a televised debate with a Philadelphia city councilman, Francis Rafferty, about Gay Pride Month.

Segal partnered with the Obama administration to create and build the nation's first official “LGBT Friendly” Senior Affordable housing apartment building. The 19.8 million dollar project known as The John C. Anderson Apartments opened in 2013.

On May 17, 2018, Segal donated 16 cubic feet of personal papers and artifacts to the Smithsonian Institution in Washington D.C.

=== Author ===
Segal is the author of And Then I Danced: Traveling the Road to LGBT Equality, a memoir of his life and experience as a gay rights activist. The book was named "Best Book" by the National Lesbian Gay Journalist Association in 2015.

== Personal life ==
Segal's friends include several gay activists, including Barbara Gittings, Frank Kameny, Harry Hay, and Troy Perry.

On July 5, 2014, Segal married his partner of 10 years, Jason Villemez. At the time, Villemez was 29 and Segal was 63. The ceremony was officiated by Judge Dan Anders, Philadelphia's first openly gay judge.
