= T&S Communications =

Chinese fiber optic communication company

T&S Communications Co., Ltd.
- Native name: 深圳太辰光通信股份有限公司
- Type: Public
- Traded as: SZSE: 300570
- Industry: Electronics
- Founded: 2000
- Headquarters: Shenzhen
- Area served: Worldwide
- Key people: Zhang Zhimin (chairman)
- Website: www.china-tscom.com

T&S Communications, simply referred to as T&S (sometimes as T and S), fully known as T&S Communications Co., Ltd., is a Chinese fiber optic communication company founded in 2000. After obtaining approval from the CSRC, the company was listed on the Shenzhen Stock Exchange in December 2016, with China Merchants Securities as its lead underwriter. It specializes in manufacturing fiber optic connectors and ceramic ferrules.

T&S products are mainly for the European and American markets, such as Hungary, and the US. The company also entered the metaverse communication network market. In 2017, it acquired Ruixinyuan Technology. In 2019, it received more than $15 million in subsidies from the Chinese government. In 2022, its full-year sales reached more than 930 million yuan.

== History ==
T&S was incorporated in 2000. It was transformed into a joint-stock company in 2011. In March 2016, its IPO application was approved. In September, it attended the ECOC Exhibition in Germany.

In December 2016, T&S officially went public on the ChiNext, under the symbol "300570.SZ". In March 2018, the company opened a joint venture plant in Cserkeszőlő with Kontaset.
