= Transcendental Students =

Former activist group

A poster featuring a man and woman copulating while playing chess and TS' signature middle finger logo advertises a 'freak in'.

Transcendental Students (TS) was a student activist and anarchist group created in 1969 at NYU in New York City. Its motto and philosophy was "insurrection through happiness".

Transcendental Students differed from the more nationally well-known student group, Students for a Democratic Society also based in New York City, both in philosophy and tactics. While SDS believed that government and society would need to be restructured, TS believed that social life could be humanized immediately through actions. As SDS pushed for reform of government or democracy, TS called for decentralization. SDS was influenced by state socialist thinking, while TS drew from anarchist and Situationist philosophy. However, TS and SDS did collaborate on some actions.

== Overview ==
TS began in the spring semester of the 1968–1969 school year after a series of sit-ins protesting overcrowding in the classroom. TS became known for holding events that they referred to as "Freak Ins" (or alternatively, "Freak Outs"). These convergences would occupy and 'free' an area, transforming study halls into radical spaces.

At NYU, TS became a large group. TS would criticize SDS, dismissing its leaders as self-serving and its politics as incomplete or petty. Soon TS eclipsed SDS on that campus. As historian William O'Neill writes in Coming Apart, "In the fall of 1969 the most important radical student group at New York University was called Transcendental Students. At a time when SDS could barely muster twenty-five members, five hundred or more belonged to TS." The group was seen as a threat by some authorities and some members found themselves spied on by the NYPD political intelligence unit or "Red Squad".

In 1970, TS organized the takeover and occupation of NYU's Courant Institute where they held a $3.5 million CDC 6600 computer hostage (equivalent to $31.2 million in 2025 dollars), demanding $100,000 ransom to be used for bail for the "Panther 21". The occupation, involving 200 students and at least 2 professors, was also in opposition to NYU's connection to the Atomic Energy Commission and Richard Nixon's invasion of Cambodia. When their demands were not met, members of TS suggested the computer's memory be erased with magnets while other students (perhaps Weathermen) decided to destroy the multimillion-dollar machine outright with incendiary devices. The devices were disabled and the CDC 6600 computer saved by mathematician Peter Lax, then director of NYU's computing center.

== See also ==
- Cacophony Society
