= New York University residence halls =

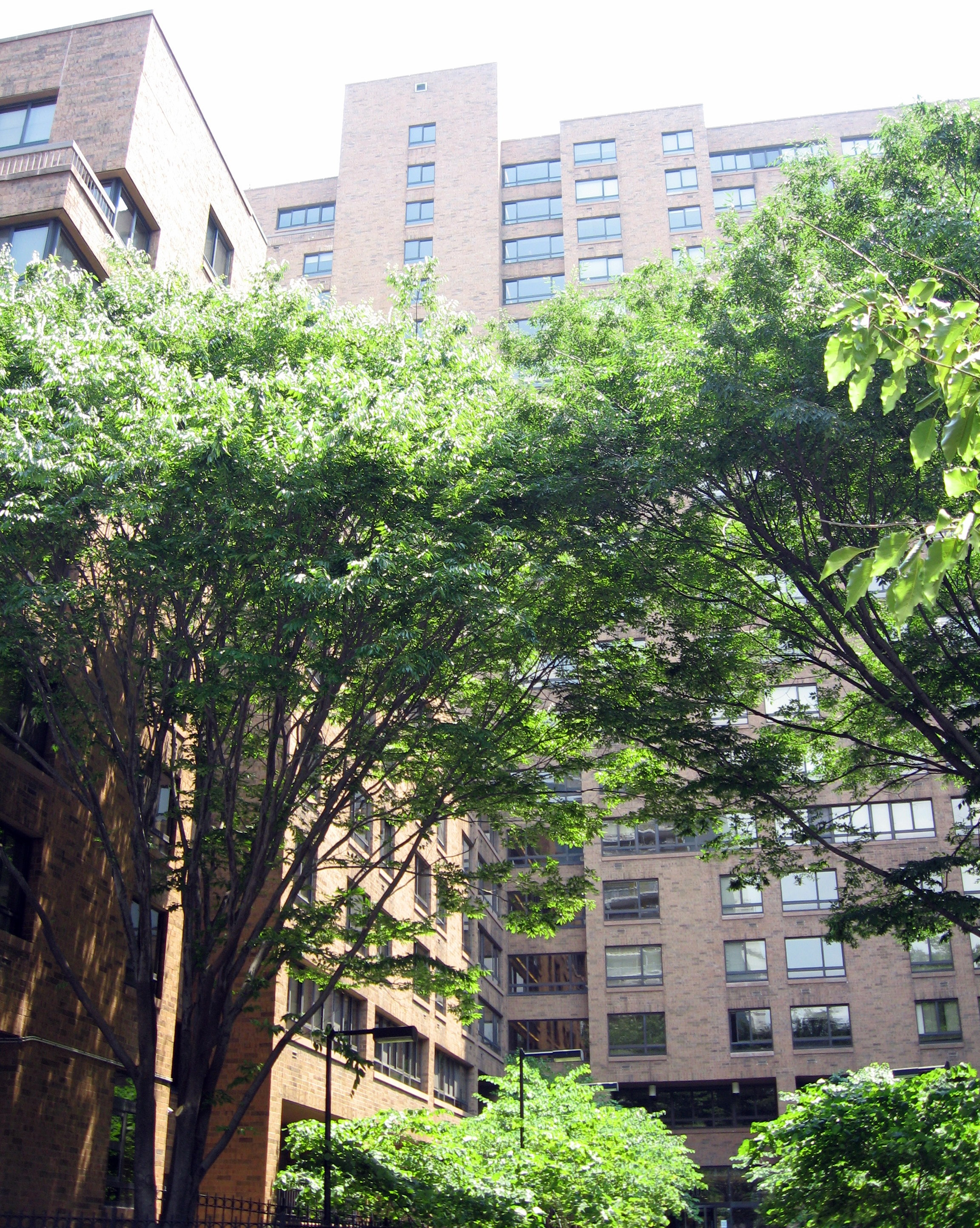
The Mercer Street Residence, reserved for law students

With 12,500 residents, New York University has the 7th largest university housing system in the United States, the largest among private schools.

== Description ==
Residence halls are unique in that many are converted apartment complexes or old hotels. Most freshman residence halls are in the Washington Square area. Many of the upperclassmen halls are in the Union Square area. Until the Spring 2005 semester, NYU used a lottery system to determine eligibility for residence hall preference. Under this system, a student received one point for every semester they had lived in campus housing. Freshmen are freed from the lottery system and are by tradition placed in the halls closest to the main campus area. Therefore, historically, most of the students who lived in halls found far from Washington Square were sophomores. However, beginning in the fall 2006 semester, sophomores received priority housing, giving them first choice of residence halls. The purpose of this initiative was to keep the sophomore class together in the Union Square area. As a result, that year's junior class (class of 2008) and senior class (class of 2007) never benefited from having first choice, either as seniors under the old system or sophomores under the new system. The university operates its own transit system to transport its students, by bus or trolley, to campus. Undergraduate students were guaranteed housing during their enrollment at NYU if they declared a need on their admissions applications.

Twenty-one buildings comprise NYU's undergraduate housing system. In general, NYU residence halls receive favorable ratings, and some are opulent. Many rooms are spacious and contain amenities considered rare for individual college residence hall rooms, such as kitchens and living rooms/common areas. All residence halls are staffed by 24-hour security staff, contain multiple resident assistants (RAs), and several halls contain faculty in residence. Unlike many other universities, NYU rooms all have their own bathrooms and thus no common bathrooms exist. Many residence halls have their own dining hall, and the university has meal choices to suit various diets. Almost all the residence halls have a laundry room that is open to resident students 24 hours a day. The price of using these facilities varies from hall to hall; as some halls are leased, NYU is unable to control the laundry prices.

All the residence halls are governed by the Inter-Residence Hall Council (IRHC), an umbrella student council organization. Each hall elects student representatives to the IRHC, and those representatives meet with one another to form committees and vote on an executive board. The goal of this group is to create programs for university students and to act as a link to university administration.

=== Recent hall construction ===
In November 2005, NYU announced plans to build a 26-floor, 190,000-square-foot (18,000 m^{2}) residence hall on East 12th Street. The residence hall is expected to accommodate about 700 undergraduates and contain a host of other student facilities. It is to be the tallest building in the East Village. The plans caused anger among East Village and other New York City residents, as the new building would be built over the old St. Ann's Church. 12th street dorm is currently in use as a freshman dorm as of August 2009. It is located between 3rd and 4th avenues, close to the Coral, Alumni, and 3rd North dorms. A small piece of the church's facade remains standing.

NYU announced in February 2008 that it had purchased a high-end apartment building to use as a residence hall. The building was already under construction for some time, originally intended for overseas investors. This building, Gramercy Green—located at 23rd Street and 3rd Avenue—is in the heart of Gramercy and near to Madison Square Park. The rooms inside the building were partitioned to maximize the number of students. The building housed over 900 in its first year. In Spring 2009, Gramercy Green opened up a massive sub-cellar, which includes a fully functioning gym, a bike room, multiple television lounges, multiple study lounges, and a game room.

== Relations with local residents ==
There has been friction between the residents of the East Village and NYU. Amongst brownstones and historic buildings, the school has built many large residence halls. NYU's destruction or purchase of many historic buildings (such as the Peter Cooper post office or St. Ann's Church, a rusticated-stone structure with a Romanesque tower that dated to 1847) have made it symbolic of change that many long-time residents fear is destroying what made the neighborhood interesting and attractive.

== Undergraduate residence halls ==
There are currently 23 buildings in New York University's undergraduate housing system. Many are home to special interest "explorations" communities.

=== First-year halls ===
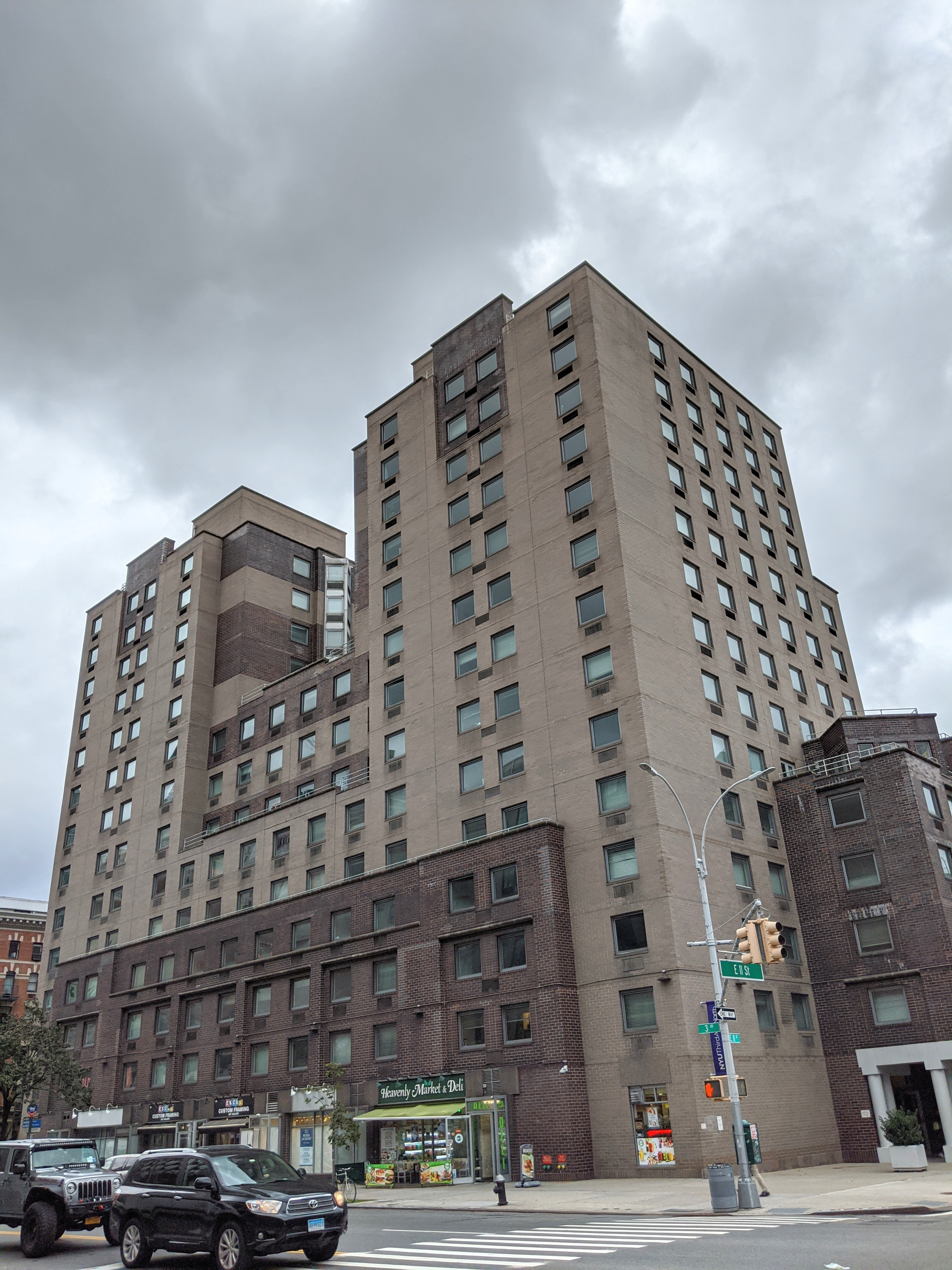
Third Avenue North in the East Village.

- Brittany Hall is a 17-story pre-war gothic high rise located at 55 East 10th Street at the corner of 10th and Broadway. The building was once a hotel and is now home to 576 freshman and 14 RAs. Comedy troupe the State was founded in Brittany in 1988.

Special Interest Communities
Featuring All Musical Endeavors

- Founders Hall is the newest addition to the system. It first opened for the Fall 2009 semester. It is located at 120 East 12th Street, houses over 700 students, and is known for its clean facilities, large windows, and extra large rooms. It is home to "The Meaning of Food", "NYU C.O.R.P.S.", "Global Citizen", and "Media Revolution" Explorations floors.
- Lipton Hall Formerly a law school residence, Lipton was one of the university's first residence halls. It is now exclusively for freshmen like most of the residence halls closest to the park. It is located at 33 Washington Square West. Lipton holds 700 students and 15 RAs. Lipton Hall was formerly known as Hayden Hall before its name was changed in June 2016.
- Rubin Hall is located at 35 Fifth Avenue, across from Church of the Ascension (New York). Prior to its purchase by NYU in the 1960s, the building was the Grosvenor Hotel. It houses 688 students and 15 RAs. During the 2023-2024 academic year, the hall underwent complete renovation, adding air conditioning to each dorm and making the building more environmentally friendly.
- Third Avenue North is the largest first-year residence hall at NYU and one of the largest in the United States, housing 952 freshmen. "Third North" is located at 75 Third Avenue (between 11th and 12th streets) and is split into three towers. Third North has 29 RAs.
- Weinstein Hall is the only pre-1980 residence hall that was built as a residence hall specifically for NYU students. It is located at 5-11 University Place. This freshman residence hall has a two level dining hall; the upper level's food court is known as "Upstein" and is adjacent to the kosher eatery. The lower level is known as "Downstein". Weinstein houses 554 students and 30 RAs. Weinstein is notable for being the dorm in which Rick Rubin and Russell Simmons founded Def Jam Records.

=== Mixed freshman/upperclassman halls ===
- Clark Street is an 11-story building located at 55 Clark Street in Brooklyn, housing over 400 students in exclusively traditional-style suites. The residence is contained in a building shared with Hotel St. George and operated by Educational Housing Services (EHS), meaning that the residence houses students from universities around New York City. Due to the nature of the arrangement, Clark St. has many amenities that other residences at NYU lack, such as in-room TV's, a private gym, a private spa, etc.
- Othmer Hall is an 18-story building located at 101 Johnson Street in Brooklyn, housing over 400 students in both traditional and apartment-style suites. The residence includes student lounges and study rooms on every floor with laundry facilities and vending machines located in its basement. The residence hall was acquired by NYU when it merged with Polytechnic University to form the NYU Tandon School of Engineering in 2015. Othmer Hall stands within the MetroTech Center, and directly adjoins the academic buildings that make up NYU Tandon, including Rogers Hall which holds Othmers primary dining hall: the Jasper Kane Café.
- University Hall is located in Union Square at 110 East 14th Street and was converted in the 2005-06 school year to all freshmen, and was then converted back to upperclassmen in fall 2009. For the 2012-2013 school year, it housed freshmen once more due to massive renovations at Brittany Hall. There was a small campus general store in the building, which in the Spring of 2006 was converted to a Dunkin' Donuts. "U-Hall" had a dining hall which was closed in 2005. The primary dining hall in U-Hall is currently operating in the general store located in "The Commons". University Hall holds 603 students and 14 RAs.

=== Upperclassman halls ===
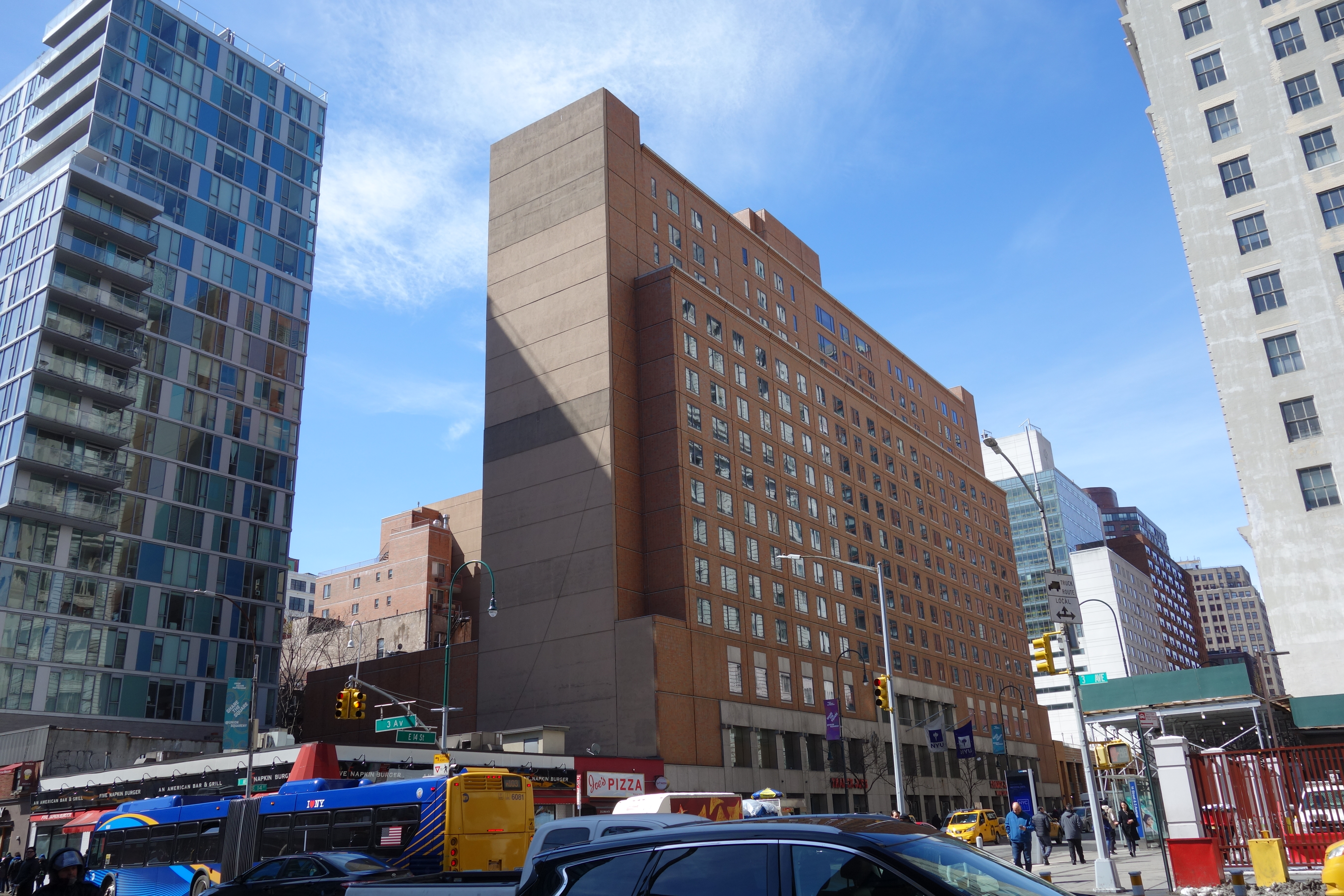
Palladium Hall on 14th Street

- Alumni Hall is located at 33 Third Avenue and houses exclusively single rooms, the only residence hall in the NYU system to do so. Alumni Hall is home to 452 residents and 12 Resident Assistants. Alumni staff and hall council are paired with the 7th Street dorm (this arrangement is commonly called the "7-A Partnership").
- Broome Street is located at 400 Broome Street and houses many sophomores and juniors. In whole, Broome holds 353 students and nine RAs. In the fall of 2007, it became a "residential college".
- Carlyle Court is located at 25 Union Square West. It houses 736 students and 15 RAs - mostly sophomores.
- Coral Towers is located at 129 Third Avenue. It, along with Carlyle Court, was once notable for having balconies to which the students no longer have access due to safety concerns. Coral holds 410 students and 13 RAs.
- Gramercy Green is one of the newest residence halls in the system, located on the northeast corner of 23rd Street and 3rd Avenue (entrance on 3rd). Gramercy Green features a new addition to the University's residence halls: it has two Chaplains in Residence. Gramercy Green is a converted luxury condo building, which is why the residence boasts numerous amenities not held in traditional 'college dorms.' These amenities include a private gym, granite countertops, marble bathroom fixtures and floor to ceiling windows. It, however, is one of the furthest dorms from campus.
- Greenwich Hotel is largely a sophomore residence hall and is located at 636 Greenwich Street. Greenwich holds 314 students and seven RAs.
- Lafayette Hall is located at 80 Lafayette Street. "Laf" is the largest residence hall at NYU, housing 1000+ students. Most of NYU Greek's Life have 'houses' in the penthouse floors of this residence hall.
- Palladium Hall is located at 140 East 14th Street and houses upperclassmen and Stern's full-time MBA students. It contains a dining area and an athletic center, which is open to the general NYU community. Palladium Hall is named after the night club, The Palladium, owned by Steve Rubell and Ian Schrager (both former owners of Studio 54) and formerly known as the Academy of Music. NYU purchased the land and built the Palladium Residence Hall in 2001. Palladium holds over 900 students with 22 RAs.
- Second Street is a small residence hall with a large percentage of its residents being returning students. It is located at 1 East Second Street. Second Street has 282 residents and eight RAs.
- Seventh Street is a small residence hall that houses mostly juniors and seniors. Its address is 40 East Seventh Street. It is known as the Green Dorm. Seventh Street is the smallest hall on campus, housing 82 students and two RAs, and so shares its staff and hall council with nearby Alumni Hall in what is commonly called the "7-A Partnership".
- 13th Street is located at 47 West 13th Street. It has four RAs and 180 residents. As of Fall 2010, 13th street became the Senior House, a residence hall open to only seniors.

== Formerly used as residence halls ==
- Cliff Street was located at 15 Cliff Street and was one of two undergraduate residence halls in the Financial District. Cliff Street housed 321 residents and six RAs. The contract NYU had with the landlord of Cliff Street ended in May 2008 and the building is no longer used by NYU.
- Goddard Hall was a small first-year hall located on 79 Washington Square East. This hall was regularly shown on NYU campus tours. Goddard housed 212 students and six RAs. In the fall of 2007, it became a "residential college". In 2022, Goddard Hall closed as a residence hall.
- Water Street formerly known as NYU at the Seaport, was an upperclassmen residence hall. Despite its distance from campus, many students favored it for the size of the rooms. With 1181 residents and 28 RAs, Water Street was the largest residence hall on campus. However, since the hall was leased and not owned by NYU, the university closed the hall in May 2009 and replaced the beds with a new residence hall recently constructed on East 12th Street (Founders Hall).

== Graduate halls ==
- D'Agostino Hall is located at 110 West Third St. "D'Ag" is one of three residence halls for law school students.
- 130 MacDougal Street is a two building law school residence also known as the "Alcott Houses". Students are not provided with cable, telephone, or internet services.
- Hayden Hall is located at 240 Mercer Street. Formerly known as "240 Mercer", the building was renamed after the original Hayden Hall located on Washington Square West was renamed Lipton Hall in 2016. It is the largest of the five residence halls for law school students.

== Notable residents ==
Brittany Hall

- Adam Sandler
- Dave Attell
- Kristen Johnston
- The State
- Tabitha Soren
- Tim Herlihy

Carlyle Court

- Sam Sheffler

Goddard Hall

- Donald Glover

Rubin Hall

- Alec Baldwin
- Chris Columbus
- Haley Joel Osment
- Sarah Silverman

Third Avenue North

- Lady Gaga
- Stephanie Hsu
- Dylan and Cole Sprouse

Weinstein Hall

- Adam Savage
- Bill de Blasio
- Def Jam Recordings
- George Drakoulias
- Wayne Federman
- Philip Seymour Hoffman
- Rick Rubin
- John Waters
- Andrew Watt
