= Queer contemporary art of the Middle East and North Africa =

Some authors often define queer expression as challenging or rethinking societal norms about gender, sexuality, and identity. Recent artists describe queer art within Middle East and North Africa as a way to encompass a wide variety of different artistic practices and media, including performance, painting, installation, photography, video, sculpture, fiber arts, drawing, mixed media practices, and more. Authors note that artists from the region and its diaspora have explored how sexuality, identity, and culture connect in their works. Both regions are also referred to as South West Asia and North Africa (SWANA) to highlight the geography instead of the Eurocentric term ¨Middle East¨.

Several predominant themes emerge in the queer art of the Middle East and North Africa. Artists frequently explore gender identity, constructing binary interpretations of gender and creating non-normative expressions of gender, often through engagement with historical or archival material. Representations of sexuality, intimacy and diaspora are likewise frequent themes seen in queer art across the region.

== Predominant themes ==
=== Interpretations of gender identity ===
Contemporary artists are exploring intersections between sexuality, gender expression, and cultural identities through their art, "queer curation" of exhibitions, and performances.

Contemporary artists like Yasmine K. Kasem and Chaza Charafeddine have explored articulations of non-normative gender expression in historical Islamic art, particularly through al Buraq, the genderless human-headed flying steed that carried the Islamic prophet Muhammad on his night journey. Kasem's Sweat Until I am Soaked (2022), a sculpture composed of three colorful Buraqs with her own face attached to them, serves as a commentary on finding space for her own identity as a queer Muslim to exist in the open.

In her Divine Comedy series (2010), Charafeddine juxtaposed different gendered portrayals of al Buraq from multiple eras in Islamic history. In Charafeddine's works, the head of al Buraq is always a portrait of a feminine individual. By incorporating various gendered interpretations of al Buraq into her pieces, Charafeddine reinforces the idea of the liminal creature as a symbol of "in-betweenness" and gender outside of a rigid binary.

Hashem El Madani, Akram Zaatari's 2004 exhibition, displays El Madani's portraits of everyday life in South Lebanon in the mid-nineteenth century. By mainly including prints of El Madani's images of individuals existing outside of the traditional gender binary, as well as images of intimate same-sex couples, Akram Zaatari engages in "queer curation." Queer curation is a practice that "places queerness at the centre of its curatorial framework" with the aim of rejecting the heteronormative status quo of Western curatorial tradition. He disrupts preconceived notions of the treatment of gender norms and identity expression in 1950s-1970s South Lebanon. Although the creation of these images at the time may not fully reflect cultural attitudes towards queer individuals, their existence pushes back against the idea that queerness in the Arab world is a much more recent phenomenon.

=== Drag ===
In the past decade, the Lebanese queer community has quickly developed a flourishing drag scene in Beirut. Bassem Feghali, a popular Lebanese comedian in the 1990´s and 2000´s, is considered to be a trailblazer in the Arab drag scene with his female celebrity impersonations. Because of the importance of performance and extravagance in Lebanese culture, Feghali was met with praise across generations. Queer friendly bars that host drag shows and other queer events are largely considered the Lebanese queer community's safe space. The up-and-coming Lebanese drag scene gives queer performance artists a safer and more legitimate place to be able to explore intersections between their Arab and queer identities through drag performance. Lebanese cultural icons like Fairuz, Sabah, and Haifa Wehbe have influenced numerous drag queens in Beirut's drag scene. Through deriving inspiration from Arab icons, drag artists view themselves as helping emphasize the important influence of Arab culture on queer Arab culture.

For several years, Madam Tayoush, a Palestinian drag queen, hosted "Jerusalem is Burning," a series of "monthly radical queer drag ball parties." Palestinian drag artists used performance spaces as a way to resist Zionist "exotification" of Palestinian bodies and condemn Palestinian society's perception of people existing outside of a conservative conception of the gender binary. During one of her performances, Madam Tayoush had the Palestinian and Israeli audience spell out an Arabic word one letter after the other, only to reveal that they all just spelled out "ihtilal," the Arabic word for occupation. Dressing up in elaborate and beautiful attire as well as creating and performing drag shows that celebrate Palestinian queer identity gives queer Palestinian drag artists the opportunity to define themselves in the broader Palestinian and Israeli community as something more nuanced than just "activists" or "victims."

A prominent figure in Tunisia´s queer community, Khookha McQueer is a drag queen and entertainer whose performances have helped create space for LGBTQ+ self-expression and community. She is an advocate against legislation which prohibits or limits sexual freedom and gender expression such as Article 230, a law dating back to the French colonial period which criminalizes same-sex sexual activity. She also raises awareness about sexual health and LGBTQ+ rights. McQueer's framing of Pride considers it not only as a public event but as an ongoing struggle for inclusion and recognition. Here, she highlights how experiences of race, colorism, and social inequality have shaped queer identity in Tunisia and argues for better self-representation for queer Tunisians.

=== Sexuality and intimacy ===
This theme describes the ways in which artists are exploring and representing questions of queer intimacy and sexuality. How artists across the region choose to represent these themes is vast and diverse. Some examples include photography of the human body that frames individuals outside of a heteronormative lens, and scenes of homo-social couplings. Youssef Nabil's work including What Have We Done Wrong, Cairo, 1993 and Malik Sleeping, Paris 2005 are only two notable examples of this focus on the body in photography.

Representations of intimacy and sexuality can also expand to works that do not directly represent the human body. Qias Assali's I Only Read About Myself on Bathroom Walls portrays a queer intimacy through the photographing of written statements and interactions on bathroom stalls. Here the intimacy is represented not through physical touch but rather through temporal proximity, a conversation that happens across time.

=== Diaspora ===
Some artists living and working in the diaspora engage with the diaspora in dialogue with queerness in their works. For example, Youssef Nabil's photos Not Afraid to Love, Paris, 2005 and What Have We Done Wrong, Cairo, 1993 both feature similar compositions: two men resting in an interior domestic space yet the position of the figures in each piece coupled with the title that include location (Paris and Cairo) illustrate diaspora as having a tangible effect on local sexuality scripts.

== List of Queer artists of the Middle East and North Africa ==
- Chaza Charafeddine (born 1964) Lebanese multidisciplinary visual artist and writer. Charafeddine's work explores identity, heritage and memory.
- Youssef Nabil (born 1972) Egyptian artist, known for hand tinted gelatin silver print photography. In his work Nabil explores issues of queerness, memory, and exile.
- Aïcha Snoussi (born 1989), Tunisian multidisciplinary visual artist. Snoussi uses drawing, paintings, and installations to represent themes of sexuality, feminism, and queerness. Snoussi's 2017 installation The Book of Anomalies reflects the artist's contemplation of gender and bodily transformation.
- Nasri Sayegh (born 1978) Lebanese multidisciplinary visual artist. Sayegh's video art work, such as Strike a Pose, draw from footage of Arab cinema and archival material to create a queer approach to historical cultural production. Sayegh highlights the aesthetics of queer expression and camp through his works.
- Qais Assali (born 1987) Palestinian interdisciplinary artist and designer. Assali's photo series I Only Read About Myself on Bathroom Walls captures queer dialogues across time by photographing messages scrawled on the sides of public restroom stalls. Assali's series proposes the setting of the restroom as an extratemporal space where queer individuals meet and interact. The series title reflects Assali's exploration of how queer identity is relegated to secretive spaces.
- Yasmine K. Kasem (born 1993) American multidisciplinary artist of Egyptian heritage. Their series Behind Closed Doors reframes stories from 1,001 Arabian Nights (Alf Layla wa Layla) to depict queer femininity. Kasem creates large-scale dyed fabric works to represent these characters and stories, reinserting queerness/foregrounding queerness in the historical narrative.
- Ahlam Shibli (born 1970) Palestinian photographer. Shibli's large body of work deals with themes of home. Eastern LGBT (2004–2006) enters into the dressing rooms and surroundings of queer individuals, depicting moments of intimacy and community as well as pride and happiness.
- Omar Gabriel, Lebanese photographer and film director working in Beirut where he's an active member of the queer community. His work combines elements of fashion, photography, and dressing up (often in drag) to interrogate the socially enforced taboos, especially sexual taboos like homosexuality.
- Mohamad Abdouni (born 1989) Lebanese artist, photographer, and filmmaker. His work explores themes of identity, sexuality, gender, and community by employing elements of fashion design and photography. In addition to his photography and films, he's the editor of a queer magazine called 'Cold Cuts' which is an influential advocate for queer voices in the Arab world.
- Raphaël Amahl Khouri, American and Jordanian theatre artist, activist, and documentary playwright, who is queer, and transgender. They are responsible for creating the first Arab transgender play, She He Me, about three Arabs subverting gender norms, facing a journey with much hardship and comedy.

== Exhibitions ==
Hashem El Madani, co-curated by Akram Zaatari, has been exhibited at the Photographer's Gallery in London in 2004 and Tate Modern in 2007. The exhibition showcases El Madani's studio photography work in South Lebanon from the early 1950s to mid-1970s. His work centers around depicting everyday life in the region and includes numerous images depicting gender non-conforming individuals and queer intimacy. While the inclusion of such images may not necessarily reflect the reality of local attitudes towards queer individuals, scholars nonetheless regard them as a portrayal of "aspirational enactments of queer belonging."

Codes of Coupling was an exhibition held at the Gypsum Gallery in Cairo in 2020. The exhibition featured artists whose works reflect queer desire and intimacy in Egyptian society, such as Mohamed Al-Bakeri's 2019 video work Between Men and Jonathas de Andrade's 2010 photo series 2 in 1.

Queer-y-ing the Arab was an exhibition curated by the Earl of Bushwick held at Apexart in Manhattan, New York in 2021. The exhibition "explores queerness through an Arab perspective" and generally interprets queerness as any non-normative expression, not necessarily referring to sexuality. The show includes Jamil Hellu's Be my guest installation, Rima Nadji's a video performance This house is virtuous and will always remain virtuous, and works by Queer Habibi, an anonymous Arab queer art collective. Habibi, Love's Revolutions exhibition was created and shown at the Institut du Monde Arabe in Paris, France from 2022-2023. The exhibition features LGBTQ+ artists from across the "Arab world" (including North Africa and Iran) whose work explores experiences with queer love, intimacy, and expression in the Arab world. Artists featured in this show include Aïcha Snoussi, Alireza Shojaian, Kubra Khademi, Chaza Charafeddine, Sido Lansari, Khaled Takreti, Lalla Rami, and Sultana.
