= BabiBoi =

American rapper (born 1999)

BabiDoll
- Born: Dorian Arriaga; July 1996 (age 30)
- Occupations: Rapper, DJ, Singer, Songwriter
- Instruments: Vocals, Turntables

Gianna Delafuente (born July 1, 1996), known by their stage name BabiDoll, previously “BabiBoi / Dorian Delafuente” is an American rapper, DJ, singer, lyricist, and community organizer.

== Career ==
BabiDoll is part of a queer art collective called House of Lepore.

Their performance background includes music, theatre, dj'ing, and organizing group performances.

In May 2020, Billboard featured BabiBoi in "Billboard Pride", which is that publication's LGBT music recommendation playlist.

BabiBoi was a featured performer at the 2020 SXSW Vogue Ball.

== Personal life ==
Babiboi uses they/she pronouns.
