= Armando Sebastian =

Armando Sebastian is a Texas based queer artist born in Monterrey, Mexico. He is known for his colorful oil paintings. He includes themes on identity, gender, and queerness from his own life as a Catholic Mexican-American in his art. Sebastian is a self taught artist who began painting professionally in Dallas, where he currently resides. He has been an active participant in several local LGBTQ+ artist events.

== Activism ==
Armando Sebastian participated in a 50-artist art donation which raised $81,000 USD for Beto O’Rourke’s gubernatorial campaign in 2022. Sebastian donated the painting Boy Charro No. 2 for the cause. He also later participated in the MaricónX Pride Show 2023, an annual event that showcases LGBTQ+ talents in the name of community and fostering acceptance.

== Awards ==
- In 2017, Armando Sebastian was granted the Artistic Merit Award by the ArtSpace111.
- He received the 2020 Culture of Value, Arts and Culture award from the City of Dallas.
- In 2024, he received the Otis and Velma Davis Dozier Travel Grant.

== Exhibitions ==
- Armando Sebastian participated in the 2024 "MaricónX: Stories de Mi Tierra" Exhibition presented by Arttitude.org.
- He displayed his solo exhibition "Reclaiming my World" in 2023 at the Goldmark Cultural Center, and again in 2024 with Texas' art foundation Arts Fort Worth.
