= Pan Homo Art Gallery =

- Formation: 2021
- Founder: Erez Bialer
- Type: Art gallery
- Headquarters: 4 HaRakevet Street, Tel Aviv, Israel
- Website: https://www.panartgallery.com/

Pan Homo Art Gallery (also known as PAN Gallery) is an Israeli art gallery based in Tel Aviv, focused on LGBTQ art, particularly male figurative and homoerotic art. It was founded in 2021 by curator Erez Bialer. It began as an online gallery and exhibition project, presenting shows in venues around Tel Aviv. It currently operates a permanent gallery space in Tel Aviv, alongside its online shop.

Interior of Pan Homo Art Gallery

== History and activities ==
PAN began in 2021 as an online gallery and shop representing Israeli and international artists. Its collection has included painting, photography, sculpture and mixed-media works. Coverage of the gallery has described its focus as male bodies and gay culture, while also noting works addressing queer identity more broadly.

In June 2021, the gallery held a temporary exhibition at the Brown TLV Urban Hotel in Tel Aviv. Later that year it presented the group exhibition Idols and Identities at the Brown's Poli House hotel as part of the ART BROWN initiative. Curated by Bialer, the exhibition included 17 LGBTQ artists from different countries.

In the following years, PAN staged exhibitions in different venues, including the Tel Aviv LGBTQ Center, hotels, Gan Ha'ir and Dizengoff Center. In 2025 it presented the exhibition Pan-Israeli Masculinity at Gan Ha'ir. In 2026 the gallery moved to a permanent space at 4 HaRakevet Street in Tel Aviv, where it presented further exhibitions that year.
