= N. A. Diaman =

- Ν. α. Διαμαντιδης
- Born: Nikolaos Aristotle Diamantidis; November 1, 1936; San Francisco, California, U.S.
- Died: November 8, 2020 (aged 84); Athens, Greece
- Known for: Queer activist, novelist
- Children: 1
- Website: www.nikosdiaman.com

N. A. Diaman (as known as Nikos Diaman, Nickolas Anthony Diaman; 1 November 1936 – 8 November 2020) was an American-Greek novelist, activist, and photo artist. He was a pioneer in the Gay Liberation Front (GLF), and he was gay.

== Early life and education ==
He was born Nikolaos Aristotle Diamantidis on November 1, 1936, in San Francisco, California, into a Greek family. His parents were both from Icaria, an island in the Aegean Sea. Diaman received a BA degree in 1958 from the University of Southern California, with a major in humanities.

== Career ==
He returned to San Francisco, and was introduced to the local poetry scene by George Stanley. Diaman became part of the Jack Spicer circle in North Beach and joined Robert Duncan's poetry workshop at the San Francisco Public Library.

After moving back to San Francisco in the fall of 1972, Diaman was the executive director of the Antares Foundation, which sponsored the San Francisco Gay Video Festival, and published Paragraph: A Quarterly of Gay Fiction.

During the early 1970s, Diaman was an early member and active in the Gay Liberation Front and the Gay Revolution Party. Diaman was also active in other Queer clubs and movements like the Radical Faeries, the Billy Club, and others. He wrote for Zygote magazine and Come Out!! before co-founding Queer Blue Light, an independent video production group.

In 2000, he launched a new career as a photo-based artist. His work is in private and corporate collections in Paris, Santa Fe, San Francisco and San Miguel de Allende, Mexico. He lived in San Francisco but had travelled regularly to San Miguel de Allende, Athens, and the Aegean Islands of Icaria and Samos, where his parents and grandparents were born.

=== Death ===
Diaman died on 8 November 2020, in Athens, after an emergency surgery, at the age of 84.

== Bibliography ==
Ed Dean Is Queer, was his first novel, was published in 1978.

- Diaman, N. A. (1978). Ed Dean Is Queer. San Francisco, California: Persona Press. ISBN 9780931906008.
- The Fourth Wall (1980)
- Second Crossing (1982)
- Reunion (1983)
- Castro Street Memories (1988)
- Private Nation (1997)
- Following My Heart (2007)
- The City (2007)
- Paris Dreams (2009)
- Athens Apartment (2009)
