= Arts First =

Annual festival at Harvard University

Harvard Arts Festival (formerly ARTS FIRST) is an annual arts festival held at Harvard University over four days at the end of the spring semester. It includes live performances (music, dance, theater, poetry readings, comedy, fashion, and more) as well as art exhibitions and art-making activities. It was founded by alum John Lithgow and Office for the Arts Director Myra Mayman in 1994 to honor the artistic community at Harvard, and is produced by Harvard's Office for the Arts (OFA). The festival producer is Alicia Anstead and the Arts Fest Coordinator is Marin Orlosky. The celebratory event is open to the public, and many of the events are free.

== Participation ==
All Harvard affiliates (undergraduates, graduate students, faculty, staff, and alumni/ae) may apply to perform and exhibit artwork during ARTS FIRST. Performing ensembles may include non-Harvard affiliates, as long as at least one performer is a Harvard affiliate.

The festival involves up to 2,000 artists, giving over 100 performances and exhibitions.

Volunteers are recruited to assist in running the festival. They are not required to be affiliated with Harvard University.

== Participant funding ==
Some funding is provided for selected Public Art projects in Harvard Yard. ARTS FIRST Performance Fair performances are directly given a free venue, publicity, and production support, instead of funding.

== Performances ==
The Performance Fair includes opera, dance, music of many genres, stand-up and improv comedy, theater, poetry and experimental performances.

== Public art ==
The festival includes exhibitions of public art in Harvard Yard and other locations around the campus. Works include sculpture, installations, or installations with performance/video components and film/video.

Student projects that are selected for exhibition in Harvard Yard receive supporting guidance from a professional visual artist.

== Harvard Arts Medal ==
The Harvard Arts Medal is an annual award established in 1995 to recognize "excellence and demonstrated achievement in the arts by a Harvard or Radcliffe alumnus/a or faculty member." The medal is given to an individual who has achieved distinction in the arts and who has made a special contribution to the good of the arts, to the public good in relation to the arts, or to education. It is awarded on the recommendation of a committee of (Harvard) faculty, alumni and administrators, by the Office of Governing Boards and the president of Harvard.

During a 2012 interview discussing his part in initiating the Harvard Arts Fest annual festival, John Lithgow said, "In 1995, I proposed the Harvard Arts Medal. The idea was to celebrate the fact that, although it's rare, Harvard men and women do go into the creative arts."

The recipient of the annual Harvard Arts Medal is celebrated during the course of the festival.

=== Recipients ===
Arts Medal year	Recipient
1995	Jack Lemmon ‘47
1996	Pete Seeger ‘40
1997	Bonnie Raitt ‘72
1998	John Updike ‘54
1999	David Hays ‘52
2000	John Harbison ‘60
2001	Peter Sellars ‘80
2002	William Christie ‘66
2003	Mira Nair ‘79
2004	Yo-Yo Ma ‘76
2005	Maxine Kumin ‘46
2006	Christopher Durang ‘71
2007	John Adams '69 MA ‘72
2008	Joshua Redman '91
2009	Fred Ho '79 and John Ashbery '49
2010	Catherine Lord '70
2011	Susan Meiselas Ed.M. '71
2012	Tommy Lee Jones '69
2013	Matt Damon '92
2014	Margaret Atwood AM '62, Litt.D. '04
2015	Damian Woetzel MPA '07
2016	Frank Gehry GSD '57 ArD '00
2017	John Lithgow '67 & '07
2018	Colson Whitehead '91
2019	Tracy K. Smith '94
2022	Rubén Blades LL.M. '85
2023	Adrian Margaret Smith Piper AM '77, PhD '81
2024	Kevin Young '92
