= Art and Queer Culture =

Book by Catherine Lord and Richard Meyer

- Author: Catherine Lord and Richard Meyer
- Language: English
- Publisher: Phaidon Press
- Pages: 412
- ISBN: 978-0714849355

Art & Queer Culture is a survey of artwork about the culture of sexual identity from the last 125 years. It is written by Catherine Lord and Richard Meyer.

The book has three sections. The first of the two-part Survey Essay is by Richard Meyer called Inverted Histories: 1885–1979, the second of the two-part essay is by Catherine Lord called Inside the Body Politic: 1980–present. The Work section showcases over 220 key artworks. The Documents section is an archive of wide range of texts.
