= Donna Gottschalk =

American photographer

- Born: New York, New York
- Known for: Photography

Donna Gottschalk is an American photographer who was active in the 1970s and came out as lesbian around the time that Radicalesbians and the Furies Collective formed.

== Personal life ==
Gottschalk grew up poor on the working-class Lower East Side, living in low-income tenement housing, one of four children (Mary, Myla, and Vinnie). Her single mother was of Irish and Italian descent and operated a beauty parlour since the 1950s. Her father was a merchant marine who suffered from untreated mental illness and alcoholism and was not allowed in the home due to frequent physical abuse. In the 1960s, she studied illustration at the High School of Art and Design. Through school, she met other lesbians who took her to iconic lesbian bars. She also became involved in the Gay Liberation Front. Gottschalk designed the "Lavender Menace" t-shirt worn by lesbian-feminist activists protesting the National Organization for Women's homophobia. Her sister Myla first came out as a gay man and then as a trans woman; Gottschalk documented Myla's transition beginning in 1992 through a photographic series. Due to being HIV+, struggling with narcotics and alcohol addictions, and suffering from violent transphobic attacks, Myla died in 2013.

She moved to California to join lesbian separatist communities. While in California, she worked as an artist's model, a topless bartender, and the driver of horse-drawn carriages.

Gottschalk lives on a small farm in Victory, Vermont.

== Career ==
Gottschalk was not a photojournalist or a documentary photographer but has been taking photos since she was 17. Her work is shown for the first time in the exhibition BRAVE, BEAUTIFUL OUTLAWS: The Photographs of Donna Gottschalk curated by Deborah Bright at the Leslie-Lohman Museum of Gay and Lesbian Art from August 29, 2018. Some of Gottschalks photographs have been published in the Gay Liberation Front newspaper Come Out!. Her photos were in storage for 40 years. The subjects of Gottschalk's photos are her friends, family and roommates.

Photojournalist Diana Davies took a photo of Gottschalk at the 1970 Christopher Street Liberation Day parade that shows her holding a sign reading: "I am your worst fear I am your best fantasy".

In 2023, having already presented five Gottschalk photographs in the group show De l'Amitié, the Parisian art gallery Marcelle Alix hosted her first ever European solo exhibition, co-curated by the writer Hélène Giannecchini: Donna Gottschalk : Ce qui fait une vie. – the title referring to Judith Butler's French version of their book Frames of War. The exhibition featured over 30 photographs selected by Donna Gottschalk and Hélène Giannecchini: vintage prints, contemporary prints from the Brave Beautiful Outlaws exhibition and digital prints made by Gottschalk herself, on a domestic inkjet printer.
