= Come Out! =

LGBT newspaper

- A Newspaper By And For The Gay Community
- First issue of newspaper
- Publisher: Gay Liberation Front
- Staff writers: Martha Shelley; Leo Martello; Marty Robinson; Kay Tobin; Jim Fouratt; John Lawritz
- Launched: November 14, 1969; 56 years ago
- Ceased publication: 1972 (issue 8)
- City: New York City
- Country: US
- OCLC number: 14078148
- Free online archives: OutHistory

Come Out! (Note: In 1970, for unknown reasons, two issues of the newspaper omitted the ! from the publication.) was an American LGBT newspaper that ran from 1969 to 1972. It was published by the Gay Liberation Front (GLF), a gay liberation group established in New York City in 1969, immediately following the Stonewall riots. The first issue came out on November 14, 1969, it sold for 35 cents, and 50 cents for outside of New York City. Its run only lasted for eight issues. Its tagline for the first paper was: "A Newspaper By And For The Gay Community".

The newspaper's purpose was to be a voice for the GLF, that would promote LGBT rights, lesbian feminism, and anti-sexism. Notable contributors to the first issue included: Martha Shelley, Leo Martello, Marty Robinson, Kay Tobin, Jim Fouratt and John Lawritz, pseudonym of John Lauritsen. (Note: List of inaugural staff: Feature articles: John Lawritz, Marty Stephan, Martha Shelley, Leo Martello, Lois Hart, Earl Galvin. News: Mike Brown, Jim Owles, Marty Robinson. Poetry & fiction: Dan Smith, Mike Boyle. Interviews: Nova, Mark Giles, John Lawritz. Art: Bob Fontanella, Barbara Payne, Rob Cobuzio, Suzanne Bevier, Robben Borrero. Research: Kay Tobin, Richard Farrell Mark Ericson. Business: Mike Boyle, Jack Openhym, Dan Smith, Lois Hart. Legal: Cohen & Cooper. Editorial consultant: Roslyn Bramms.) Come Out! was popularly known as the first newspaper of Gay Liberation. The newspaper was mainly sold by members of the GLF on the streets of NYC, with a few newsstands that carried them as well.

== Background ==
Roslyn Bramms, former managing editor of SCREW, was instrumental in getting the first issue to press. Since the GLF members had no experience in publishing a newspaper, she tutored them on how to gather news, prepare the copy, and the legal requirements for production. In the first issue, they published a scathing critique of The Village Voice, an alternative newsweekly based in NYC, for not allowing the words gay and homosexual to be used in their classified ads section, after they had submitted an advertisement to them. An employee at The Village Voice told them they considered the two words to be "obscene". Three representatives from the GLF then met with co-founder Ed Fancher of the Voice, and he agreed to change their policy on the two words. (Note: A photograph accompanied the article showing members of the GLF protesting outside of The Village Voice, with a poster that read: Village Voice won't print gay in ads but calls us "dikes & faggots".)

After the first issue was published, members of the 'June 28 cell' of the GLF informed the GLF members that they would be taking control of the newspaper, allegedly in order to save it. Several of the original staff members decided not to stay with the publication after the takeover.

For the second issue, gay rights activists Bob Kohler and Bob Martin joined the newspaper. Subsequent issues also featured various notable contributors, including: gay rights activists Perry Brass, Dennis Altman, Tony Diaman and Ellen Broidy, feminist Rita Mae Brown, transgender activist Angela Lynn Douglas, and photographers Diana Davies and Donna Gottschalk. They also re-printed articles from the underground newspaper Rat. The last three issues of Come Out! were published from Brass' apartment in NYC.

Content in the various issues would feature personal accounts and photos of GLF marches and gay rights rallies, and poems, along with editorials. They also interviewed well known members of the local community, and covered international news, like the Cuban human rights issues. In addition, the periodical covered issues affecting the transsexual and transvestite community.

In an interview with Windy City Times, Shelley remarked that at the time, there was an abundance of newspapers and magazines that were "expressing their ideas", from multiple leftist organizations. So the GLF jumped into the fray with their own ideas and style of writing. She said that no journalism degree was required to write for Come Out!, and they covered stories that the New York Times wouldn't. But as a result, sometimes the newspaper "quality was uneven", which she regrets.

Shelley relayed that the newspaper got published as a result of her working part-time in a typesetting establishment. The owner of the shop would let her come in after hours and set the copy for the newspaper, and then she would bring it to the people responsible for the layout, and they would work on it, and get it off to the printer. When the paper was published, she'd "grab a bunch of copies and go out onto the streets of Greenwich Village and hawk them".

As she stood in the snow on a Village street corner in a pair of sneakers and a torn leather jacket, yelling Get your copy of Come Out!, a well-dressed couple passed by, pushing a stroller and looking at Shelley with horror. Just as they passed by, Shelley said, "Get your copy of Come out!. Read what your kids going to be like when he grows up", Shelley recalls. "And they jumped, and I just loved it. It was a way of giving the world the finger for what they were doing to me."

— Martha Shelley, Stonewall: The Riots That Sparked The Gay Revolution

== Analysis and critique ==
Steven Dansky was an original member of GLF, and wrote for Come Out!; he now writes for the magazine The Gay & Lesbian Review Worldwide. He opined that Shelley took the initiative into examining, and then writing about the "subjugation of women", and as a result she was instrumental in forging "a liberated female identity". He said that although the newspaper quickly blossomed with "intense, palpable energy", it was inevitable that it would be "short-lived". Dansky argues that there was a tension between the "gay male and lesbian interests" at the newspaper, which made it feel like "an implosion" was going to happen. He also noted that there were several competing publications at the time too. However, in the long run, he contends that there is a strong case to reach the conclusion that the newspaper "shaped the debate on sexuality and gender for decades to come".

Amber Dickinson wrote in the book LGBTQ+ (1923–2017), that the newspaper writers "promoted the political participation" of the LGBT community, with a goal to end discrimination against LGBT people. She said the periodical encouraged LGBT people to come out of the closet, and give a voice to how "wrong the oppression of the gay community was". She opined that the GLF knew if there was ever going to be any changes in the status-quo for the LGBT community, they would have to get involved in the "political process", in order to end discrimination against them.

== See also ==
- Fag Rag
- List of LGBTQ periodicals
- List of lesbian periodicals
- Socialism and LGBTQ rights
