= Third Horizon Film Festival =

Annual film festival in Miami, Florida

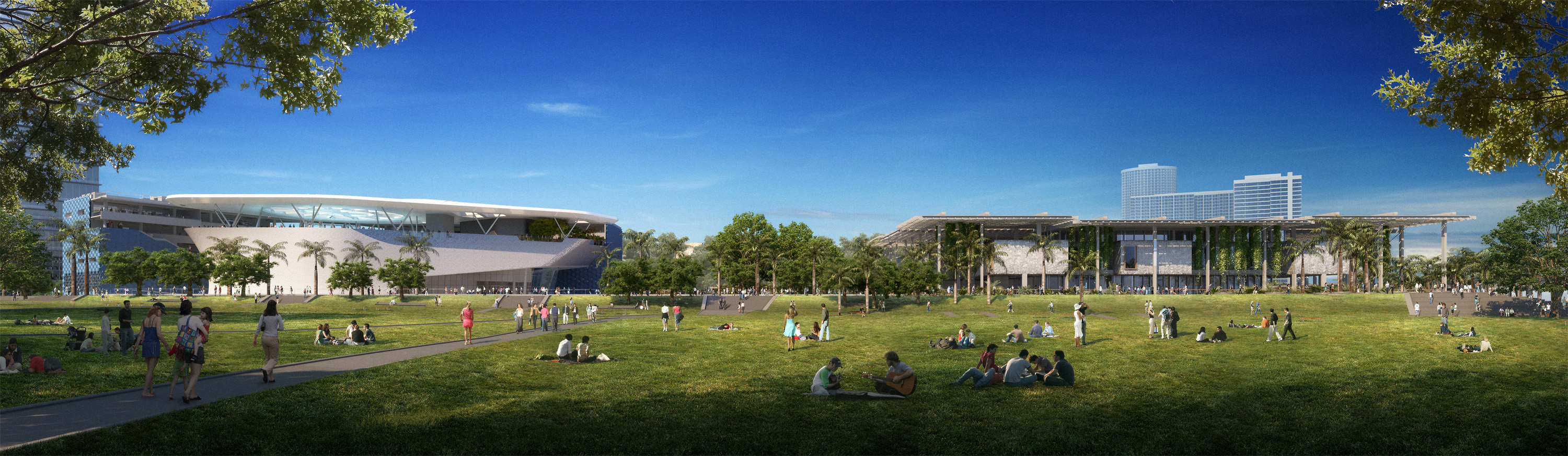
- Pérez Art Museum Miami, FL, 2024 screening venue
- Location: Miami, Florida, U.S.
- Founded: 2016; 10 years ago
- Most recent: May 9–12, 2024
- Website: www.thirdhorizonfilmfestival.com

The Third Horizon Film Festival (THFF) — first known as the Third Horizon Caribbean Film Festival – is a major international film and media arts festival held annually to celebrate Caribbean culture, its diaspora, and the Global South in Miami, Florida. The Third Horizon Film Festival was officially established in 2016 to present competitive and non-competitive screening sections including feature films, documentaries, short-length movies, and experimental narratives. In addition of its moving-image programming, the THFF also includes a series of performances, visual arts components, panel discussions, and lectures.

== History ==
The Third Horizon Film Festival was founded as the Third Horizon Caribbean Film Festival in 2016 by Barbados-born musician and journalist Jason Jeffers, London-based Trinidadian Jonathan Ali, a film festival programmer with experience at both the Trinidad and Tobago Film Festival and the Toronto International Film Festival, as well as by Robert Sawyer and Keisha Rae Witherspoon.

In 2016, the festival's program, which was not competitive at the time, was made up of nine fiction and documentary features (including a film screening as a work in progress) and eleven short films, all making their United States or Florida premieres.

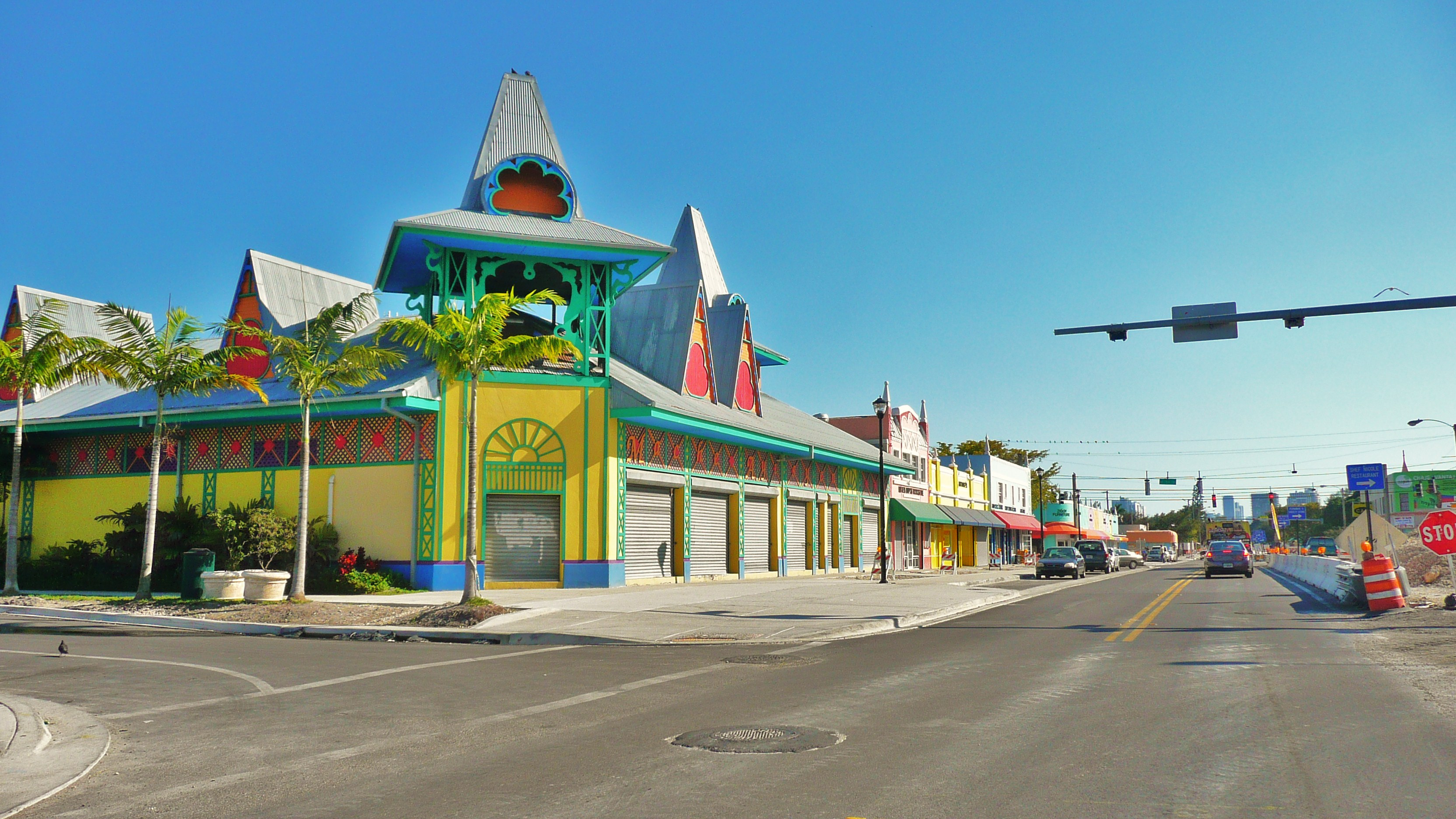
Little Haiti neighborhood south side in Miami

The festival's founding venue, O Cinema Wynwood, ended operations in 2020 which led the THFF collective to seek additional community-focused collaborations in the Little Haiti neighborhood.

== Editions ==
The THFF's first edition occurred from September 29 to October 2, 2016, at the O Cinema, a venue in the Wynwood neighborhood, Miami. Guetty Felin's Ayiti Mon Amour was the opening screening and other 12 short films were exhibited during the festival.

The 2nd Third Horizon Caribbean Film Festival took place from September 8 to October 1, 2017, at O Cinema in Miami in the aftermath of Hurricane Irma, which reached the coast of Florida that year.

The 3rd Third Horizon Caribbean Film Festival was held from September 27 to 30, 2018, at O Cinema with exception of opening night, which took place at the Pérez Art Museum Miami. This edition covered a wide range of themes such as Afro-Brazilian culture, and Cuban migration to the United States.

In 2019 and 2021, the Third Horizon Film Festival was selected among the "25 Coolest Film Festivals in the World" by MovieMaker Magazine.

The 4th Third Horizon Caribbean Film Festival took place from February 6 to 9, 2020, at the Little Haiti Cultural Complex in Miami under the theme "No Place Like Home" as the festival's previous venue, O Cinema Wynwood, shut down operations. For this edition, a line up of 30 short films and 12 feature films from across the Caribbean region – including Cuba, Puerto Rico, Haiti, Jamaica, and Trinidad and Tobago — were screened. The film selection touched on gentrification, climate change, and immigration issues.

The 5th Third Horizon Film Festival was held through a hybrid mode, with online and in person screenings, from June 24 to July 1, 2021, in Miami, Florida. The Pérez Art Museum Miami hosted an in person screening and a panel discussion at the institution. For the virtual viewing, attendees had access to the official Third Horizon Film Festival app, which was available on Amazon Fire TV, Stick, Apple TV, and Roku.

The 6th Third Horizon Film Festival took place from June 23 and 26, 2022 at familiar venues such as the Little Haiti Cultural Complex and the Pérez Art Museum Miami. The festival presented a larger to date list of screenings and its roster included more than 50 films, most shorts, and gathered a combination of in-person and virtual screenings repeating the previous year format for maximum accessibility.

Third Horizon was not held in 2023, but the organization presented a screening in collaborations with the New Orleans Film Society. Gessica Généus, a film director and THFF alumni presented the feature-length fiction film Freda, which was preceded by a series of short screenings.

In 2024, the 7th Third Horizon Film Festival expanded its presentation in Miami with a multivenue opening celebration. After a two-year hiatus, the THFF returned in-person from May 9 to 12 and virtually from May 13 to 19 for its seventh iteration. In its 40 film selection representing over 20 countries including the Dominican Republic, Puerto Rico, and Jamaica, the festival presented a roster of productions through PAMMTV, the video art streaming platform produced by the Pérez Art Museum Miami.

== See also ==
- List of film festivals
- List of film awards
- List of film festivals in the United States
