= Pérez Art Museum Miami =

Art museum in Miami, Florida

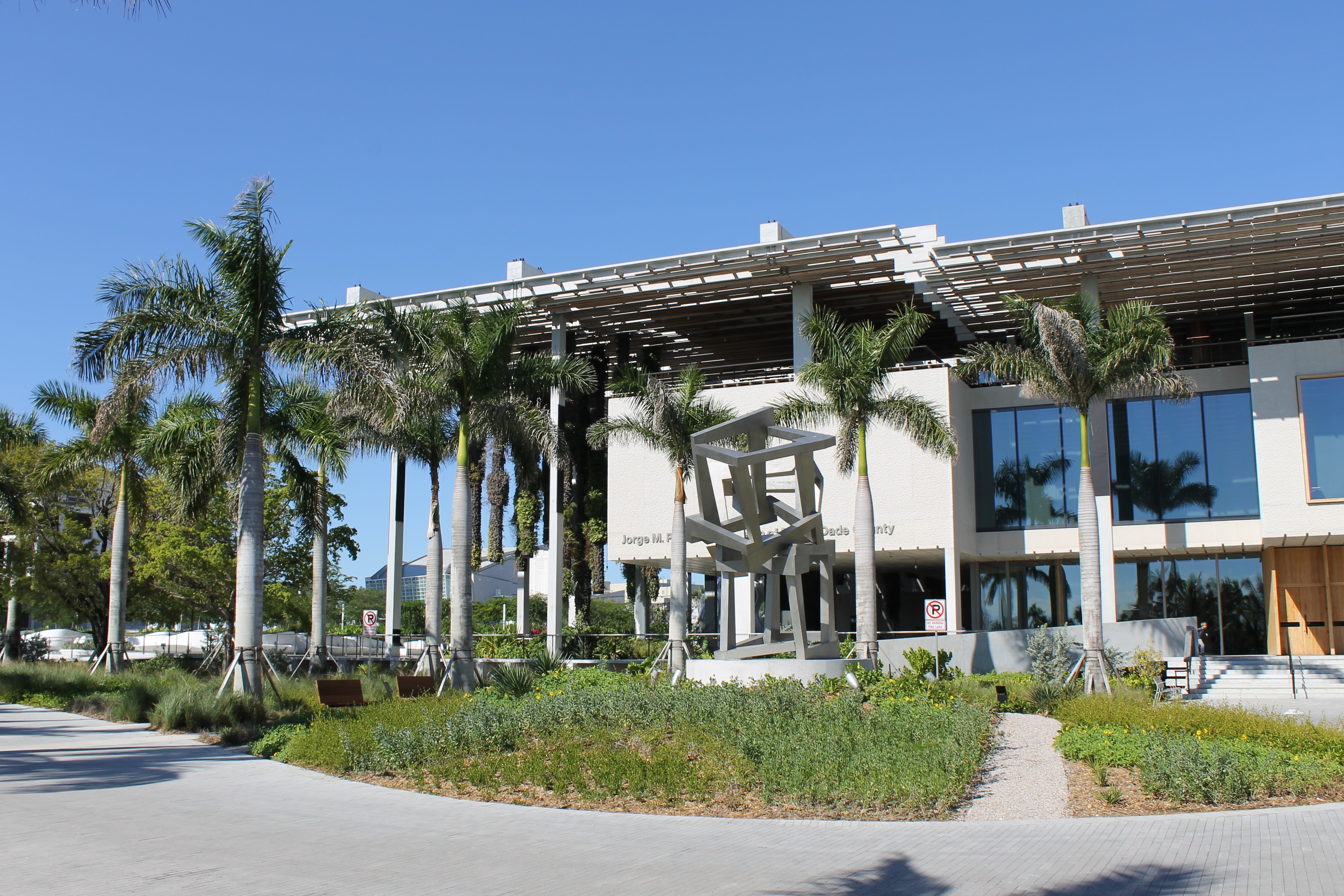

- Location within Miami Location within Florida Location within the United States
- Former name: Miami Art Museum
- Established: 1984
- Location: 1103 Biscayne Boulevard; Miami, Florida, United States 33132; Formerly at: 101 West Flagler Street
- Coordinates: 25.785894°N 80.186705°W
- Type: Art museum
- Visitors: 150,000 (2013-2014)
- Director: Franklin Sirmans
- Curator: Franklin Sirmans
- Public transit access: Museum Park station (Metromover), Metrorail via Metromover transfer at Government Center station
- Website: www.pamm.org

Pérez Art Museum Miami (PAMM)—officially known as the Jorge M. Pérez Art Museum of Miami-Dade County—is a contemporary art museum that relocated in 2013 to the Maurice A. Ferré Park in Downtown Miami, Florida. Founded in 1984 as the Center for the Fine Arts, it became known as the Miami Art Museum from 1996 until it was renamed in 2013 upon the opening of its new building designed by Herzog & de Meuron at 1103 Biscayne Boulevard. PAMM, along with the $275 million Phillip and Patricia Frost Museum of Science and a city park which are being built in the area with completion in 2017, is part of the 20-acre Maurice A. Ferré Park (formerly Bicentennial Park, Museum Park).

In 2014, the museum's permanent collection contained over 1,800 works, particularly 20th- and 21st-century art from the Americas, Western Europe and Africa. In 2016, the museum's collection contained nearly 2,000 works.

Since the opening of the new museum building at Maurice A. Ferré Park, the museum has seen record attendance levels with over 150,000 visitors in its first four months. The museum had originally anticipated over 200,000 visitors in its first year at the new location. At its former location on Flagler Street, the museum received on average about 60,000 visitors annually.

Pérez Art Museum Miami is directly served by rapid transit at Museum Park Metromover station.

== History ==
=== Miami-Dade Cultural Center ===
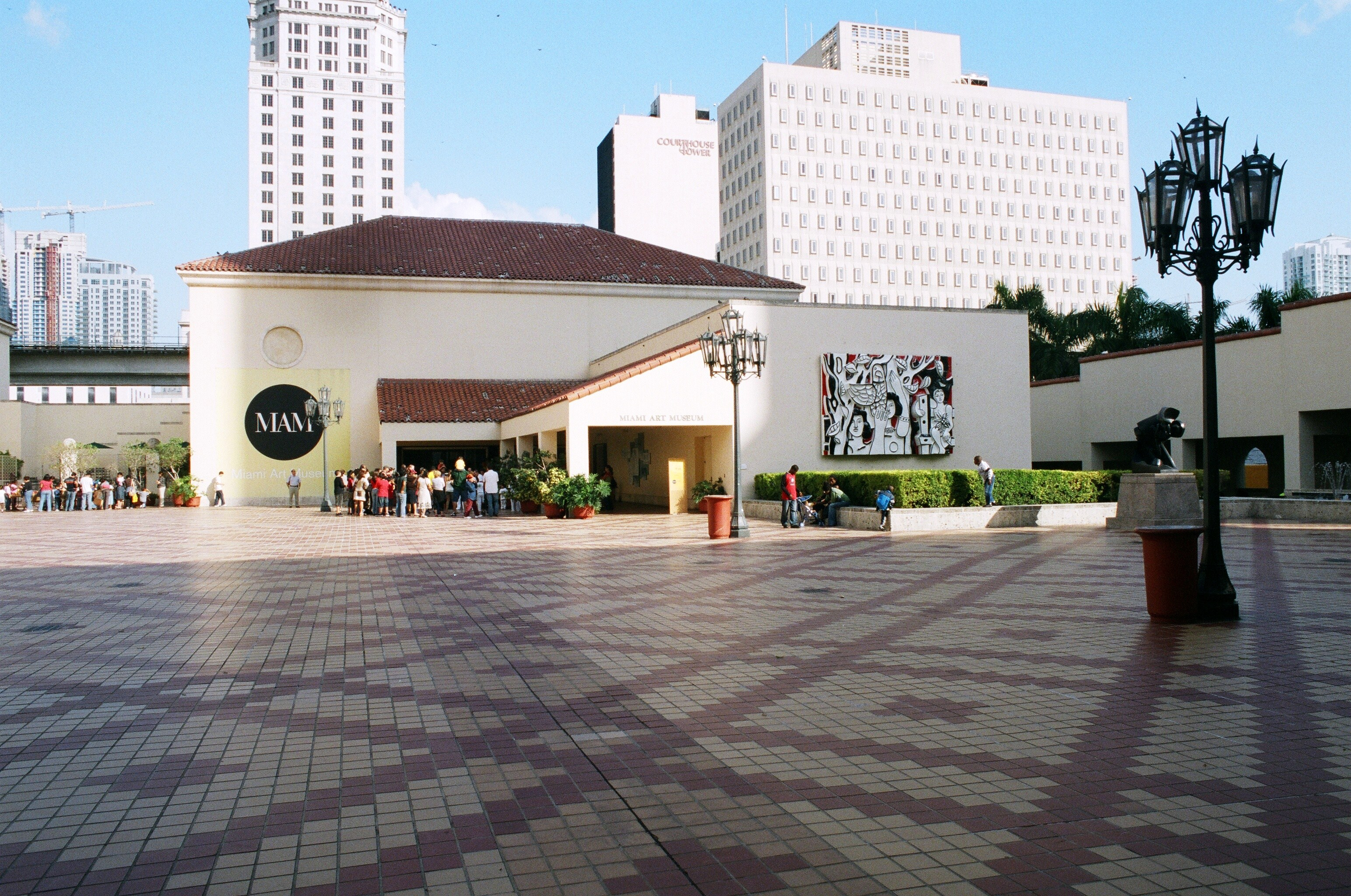
former museum building/location

On November 7, 1972, a county referendum passed that included the "Decade of Progress" bond. This bond provided funding for investments in the arts, including for a new art center. The Center for the Fine Arts opened in the downtown Miami-Dade Cultural Center, a 1983 Spanish-style barn and the first of three buildings to be unveiled in a $24 million county-owned complex designed by Philip Johnson. The museum was built at 101 West Flagler Street in the same Miami Cultural Plaza as HistoryMiami and the Miami-Dade Public Library. The opening's delay of more than a year was occasioned by a $16.5 million renovation of the smoke evacuation system for the complex. Founded as a hall for traveling shows, the $6 million fine arts center did not start acquiring art until 1996. But its efforts were constrained by little storage or exhibition space. The Miami Art Museum was founded in 1996 as a successor to the Center for the Fine Arts.

=== Jorge M. Pérez Art Museum of Miami-Dade County ===
In November 2010, construction began on the new MAM building in Museum Park in Downtown Miami. The building is designed by Swiss architects Herzog and de Meuron, who were hired by Terence Riley, director of the museum in 2009, when plans were made. The structure is meant to resemble Stiltsville, which is the name given to a group of wooden houses built on stilts that stand off the coast of Key Biscayne in Biscayne Bay. The new museum building was built alongside the new Miami Science Museum building at the redesigned park. The three-story building has 200,000 square feet (19,000 m^{2}), composed of 120,000 interior square footage, and 80,000 exterior square footage. Inside the museum, display spaces can be illuminated by floor-to-ceiling windows, which can also be blocked off or used as backdrop. Otherwise the rooms get clinically even light delivered by strips of fluorescent tubes, though spotlights can also be used. A grand staircase — nearly the entire 180-foot width of the platform — connects it to the waterfront. Thick, sound-absorbing curtains cordon off one large or two small areas of the stair for programs.

With their raised, wraparound terraces and broad overhanging canopies, the houses are conceived to withstand hurricanes and floods, while providing ample shade and ventilation. The museum also incorporates a series of hanging vertical gardens made from local plants and vegetation, designed by French botanist Patrick Blanc. Blanc experimented with different kinds of species throughout the years and the gardens now comprise 80 kinds of plants which are supposed to survive subtropical heat as well as hurricanes. According to Christine Binswanger, the project architect, the plants provide a transition for visitors entering from the outdoors. The new PAMM building opened in December 2013, and the Miami Science Museum building opened in May 2017.

To build the new $131-million museum building, the MAM entered into a public-private partnership with the City of Miami and Miami-Dade County. The location on Biscayne Bay was provided by the City of Miami. The museum cost $220 million to build, with $100 million coming from Miami-Dade voters in general obligation bond funding, and $120 million from private donors. As of mid-2011, private donors had committed more than $50 million in additional support for the building and institutional endowment. Jorge M. Pérez, longtime trustee and collector of Latin American art, made a gift of $35 million, to be paid in full over ten years, to support the campaign for the new museum, which was in turn renamed the Jorge M. Pérez Art Museum of Miami-Dade County. The new MAM location is intended to transform Museum Park into a central destination on Miami's cultural map, promote progressive arts education, build community cohesiveness, and contribute substantially to downtown revitalization.

== Architecture ==
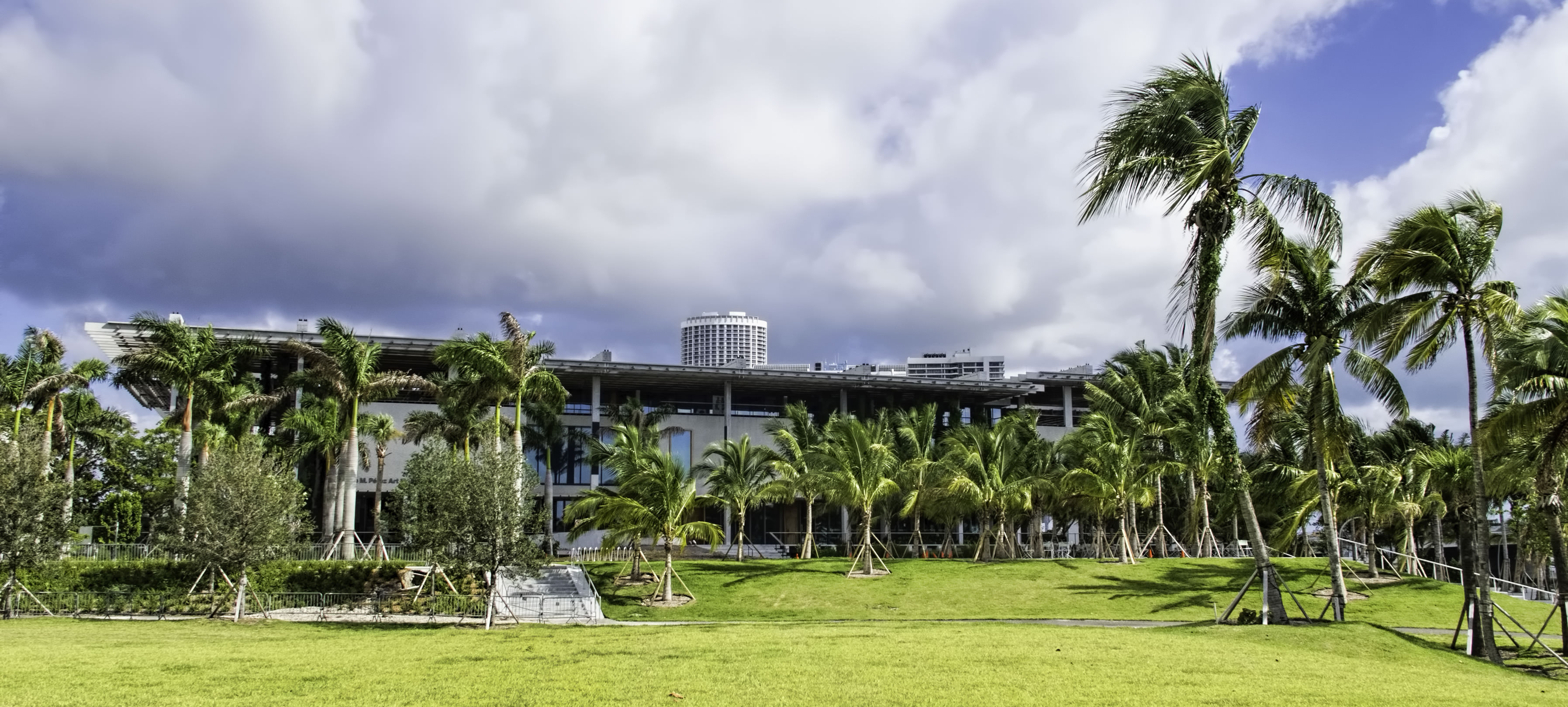
The Pérez Art Museum viewed from Museum Park

Herzog & de Meuron's design for the new building has drawn critical acclaim. For example, the Wall Street Journal stressed that their design could be instrumental in making the museum a destination and the New York Times called the design "spectacular" The Washington Post went as far as to say that "the new setting is as much a part of the gallery as the collection".

The Perez Art Museum Miami was chosen for the 2015 American Society of Landscape Architects (ASLA) Professional Awards.

== Collection ==
The museum displays paintings, drawings, prints, sculptures, installation art, video, and photography.

The Pérez Art Museum has been collecting art since 1996. The focus of the museum is 20th century and contemporary art, as well as cultures of the Atlantic Rim, which it defines as the Americas, Western Europe and Africa. At the time of the new building's opening, the museum's holdings included 1,800 objects, nearly 500 of which were acquired in 2013, including pieces by John Baldessari, Olafur Eliasson and Dan Flavin. In its permanent collections, there are second half of the twentieth century and Contemporary works by Purvis Young, Joseph Cornell, Kehinde Wiley, James Rosenquist, Frank Stella, and Kiki Smith.

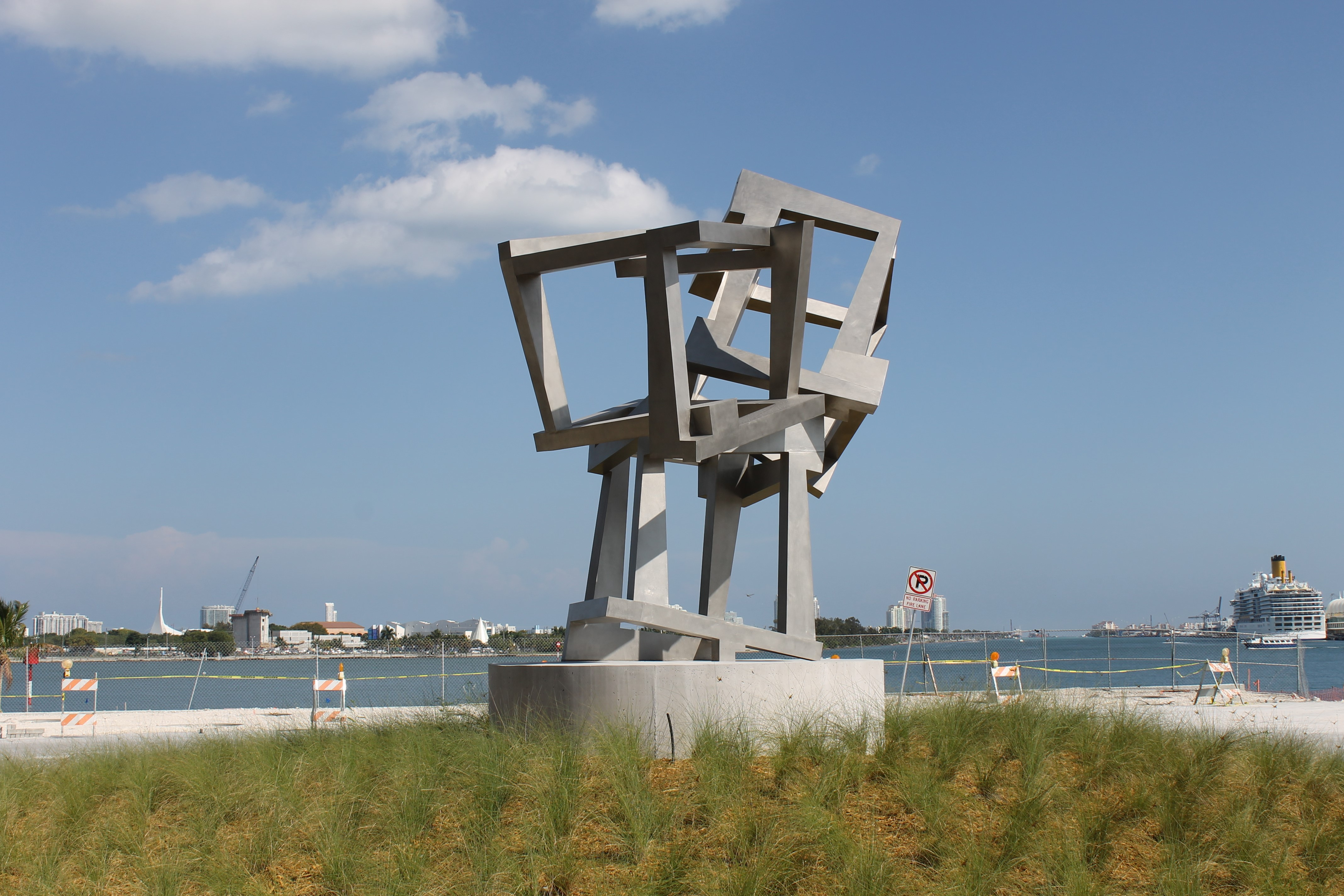
Chaos SAS by Jedd Novatt (2012, stainless steel) outside the Pérez Art Museum

Much of the museum's current collection has been donated, with 110 works coming from Jorge M. Pérez, among them pieces by the Cuban painters José Bedia Valdés and Wifredo Lam, as well as the Mexican artists Diego Rivera and Damian Ortega, the Uruguayan Joaquín Torres-García and the Colombian Beatriz González.

In 2012, Pérez pledged $500,000 to establish an acquisitions fund for African-American art, matched shortly after by the Miami-based John S. and James L. Knight Foundation. The fund allowed to the expansion of the museum collection by sponsoring acquisitions from Terry Adkins, Romare Bearden, Kevin Beasley, Ed Clark, Leslie Hewitt, Faith Ringgold, Tschabalala Self, Xaviera Simmons, Juana Valdez, among others. In 2014, the museum launched the Ambassador of African American Art program, its first-ever affiliate group, which invites donors to contribute directly to the fund.

In 2013, museum trustee and Miami developer Craig Robins pledged 102 paintings, photographs, sculptures and other works from his personal collection.

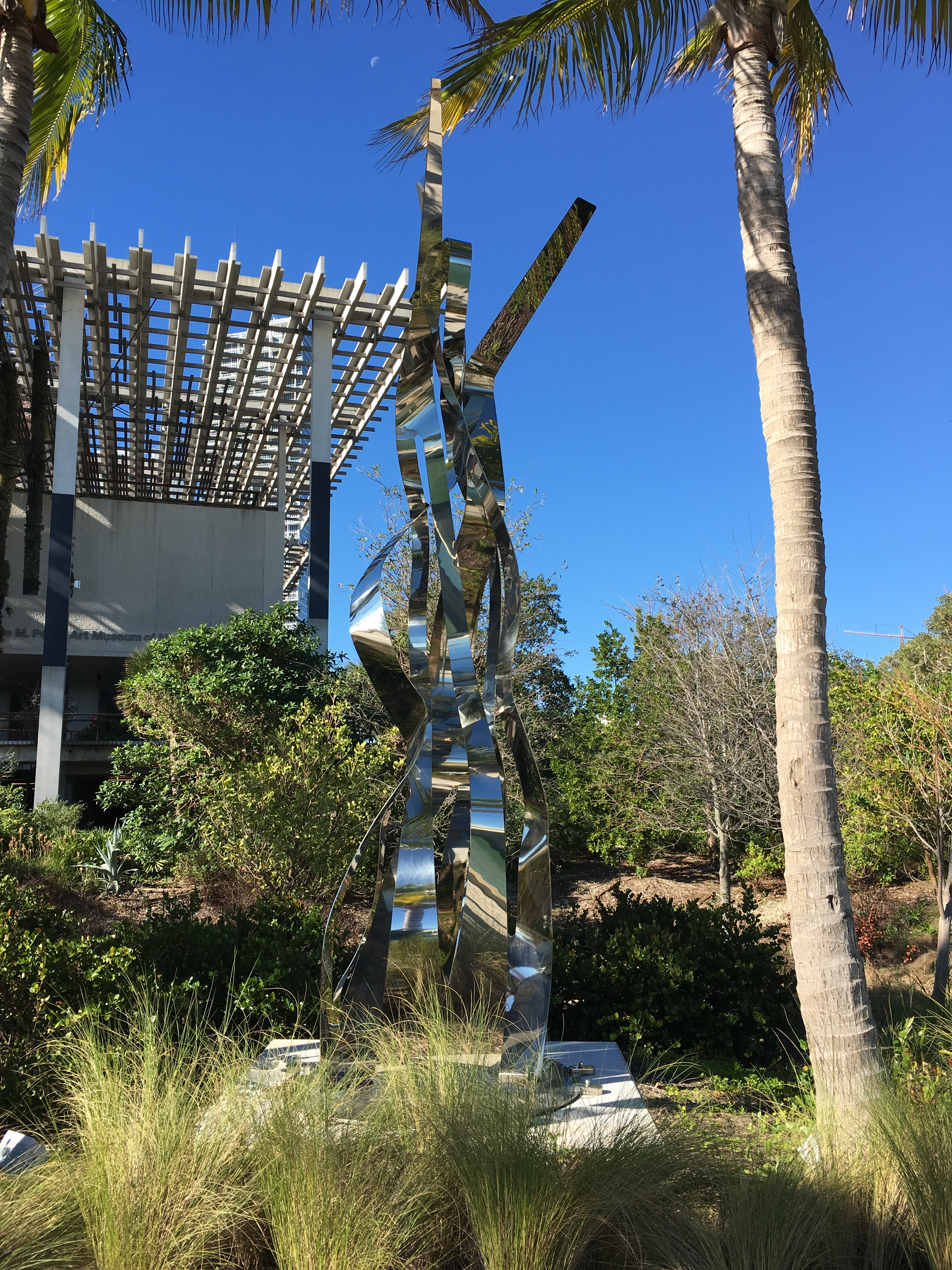
Endless Evolution by Pablo Atchugarry (2015)

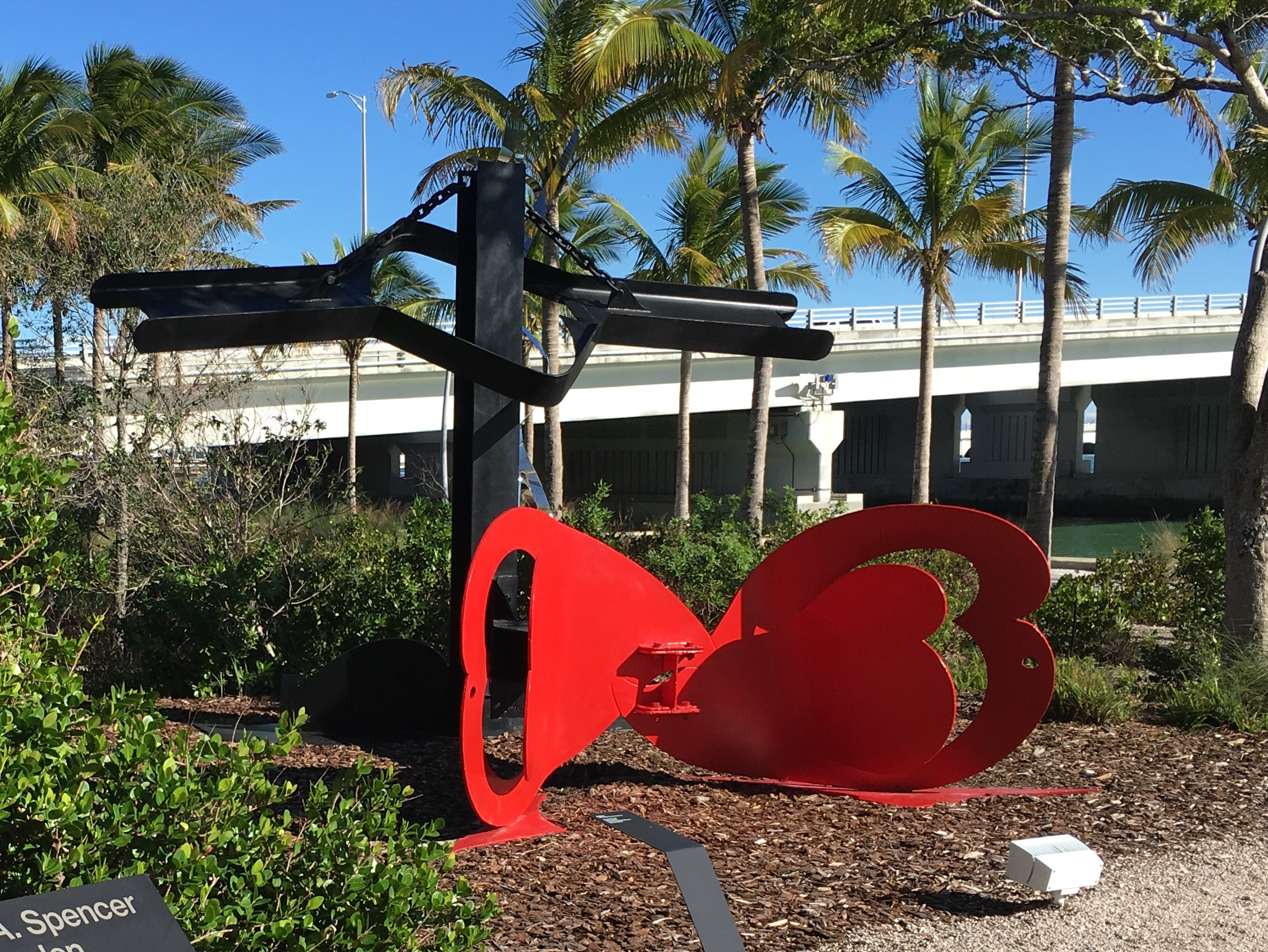
La Plume de Pierrot by Mark di Suvero (1974, painted steel) in the Mary M. and Sash A. Spencer Sculpture Garden

In 2016, Pérez made a second significant donation of art and an additional pledge of $10 million to be paid over the following 10 years. The museum was required to use the first $5 million of this donation to acquire contemporary Cuban art. The second $5 million went to the museum's endowment, and Pérez said he wanted the donation to entice other wealthy patrons to give to the museum. The art included more than 200 pieces (appraised at $5 million) from Pérez's personal collection of contemporary Cuban art, including pieces by Glexis Novoa, Rubén Torres Llorca, Hernan Bas and José Bedia. As a result, the PAMM now has one of the largest collections of contemporary Cuban art in America.

As of 2017. Pérez had donated over 170 works.

In 2019, sixteen works by the artists Christo and Jeanne-Claude worth around $3 million were donated to Pérez Art Museum Miami by its trustee Maria Bechily and her husband Scott Hodes.

Also in 2019, the Pérez Art Museum Miami announced the selection of the third annual New Art Dealers Alliance (NADA) gift for the museum, the painting New Hat (2019) by Dominican-American artist Kenny Rivero.

In 2019 the museum announced a special section of Frieze New York, curated by director Franklin Sirmans. The section shows artists from Just Above Midtown (JAM), the 1979-80s Black Power Art Gallery.

== PAMMTV ==
In September 2023, Pérez Art Museum Miami launched PAMMTV the first on demand streaming service for video art and time-based media content in the cultural sector. PAMMTV is a free-of-charge platform hosting videos and films by local and international artists in PAMM's collections including Sandra Ramos, Youssef Nabil, Wangechi Mutu, and Los Carpinteros, as well as film festivals such as Miami-based Third Horizon Film Festival (THFF) and thematic exhibitions in the likes of Perpetual Motion, guest curated by film and video art curator, Barbara London featuring Cornelia Parker, Bang Geul Han, Wong Ping, and Richard Garet, among others. PAMMTV's public programming is organized around on-site film screenings and public talks.

== Digital Portal ==
Heckscher Digital Portal consists of resources for educators, youths, and families. Tools in the form of downloads, guides, slide shows, and videos.

=== Curriculum Resources ===
Inquiry based lesson plans focus on the museum's permanent collection to offer educators resources aligned to Florida State Standards that introduce students to modern and contemporary art.

=== PAMM App Tour ===
Multimedia content and tours of exhibitions.

== Management ==
=== Directors ===
- 2010–2015: Thom Collins
- 2015–present: Franklin Sirmans

=== Attendance ===
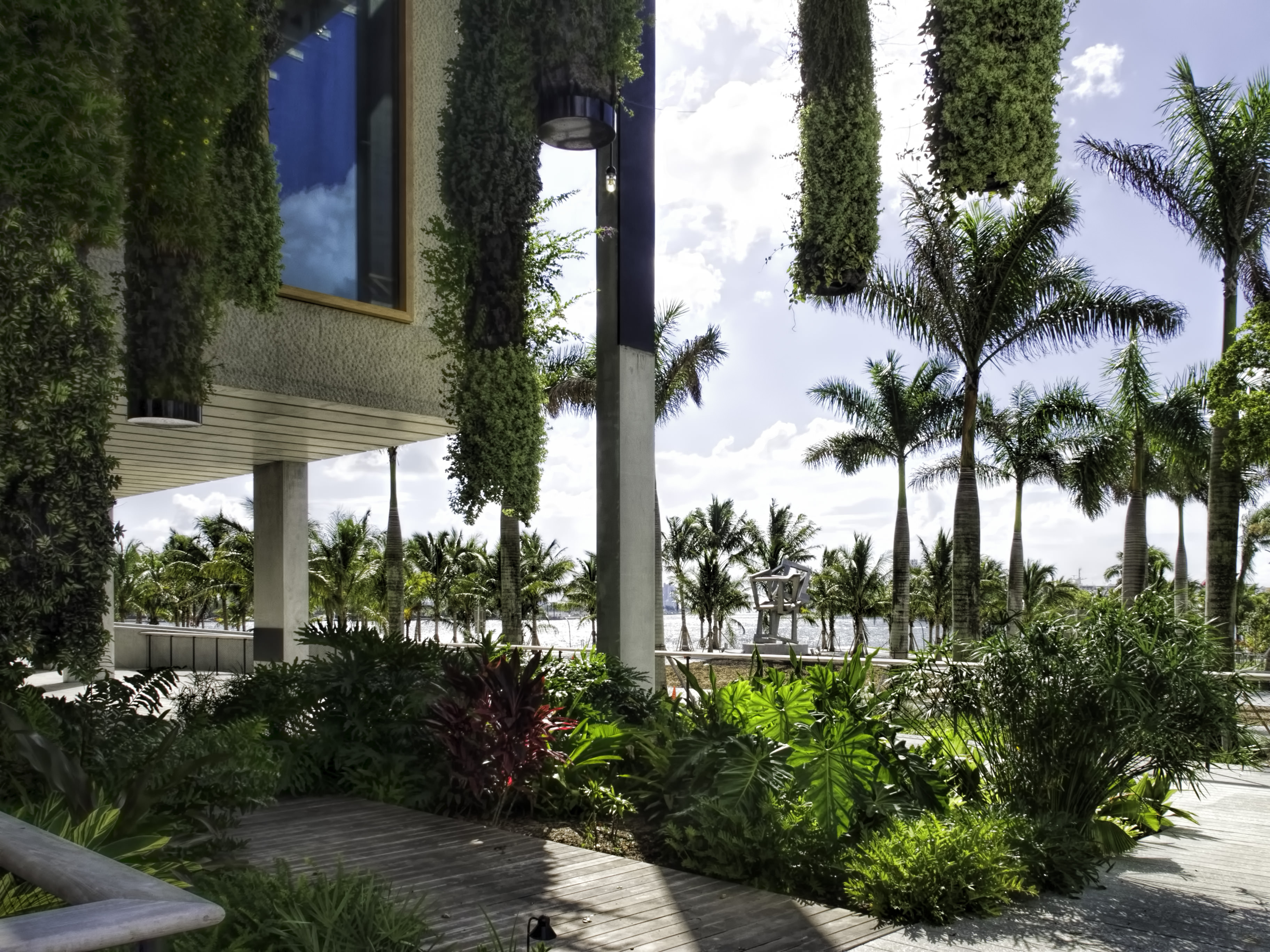
Museum entrance

After the opening of the new museum building, the museum has seen over 150,000 visitors in its first four months and 300,000 visitors in its first 12 months. According to The Art Newspaper’s annual survey of museum attendance, the "old" Miami Art Museum (PAMM's predecessor) attracted 54,295 visitors in 2012 — a weak showing in a metropolitan area with a population of five million people. Aaron Podhurst serves as chairman of the museum's board and Gregory C. Ferrero has been serving as president since 2017.

=== Budget ===
As the Miami Art Museum, the museum had an annual operating budget of $6 million. After the inauguration of the new building and the museum's renaming, the budget increased to $16 million per annum, with a rapid increase of staff and curators. In 2013–14, Miami-Dade County provided $2.5 million of this (up from $1.9 million the previous year).

In 2019, Pérez Art Museum Miami received a $1 million gift from the Andrew W. Mellon Foundation in support of the institution's newly formed Caribbean Cultural Institute, which is intended to promote the research and exhibition of work by artists from the Caribbean and its diaspora. In 2024, collector Kenneth C. Griffin donated $10 million donation to the museum, which will use the funds to maintain its collection and which will now establish a gallery in his name.

== Projects ==
=== Inside|Out ===
In the summer of 2017, PAMM participated for the second time in the Knight Foundation-funded program Inside/Out. During the three-month project, PAMM displayed replicas of its artworks throughout the neighborhoods of Miami-Dade. The project is funded from $150,000 per year from the Knight fund.

=== PAMM Student Pass ===
In March 2018, PAMM launched the PAMM Student Pass in cooperation with Miami-Dade County Public Schools (M-DCPS). The pass grants free entrance to the museum for M-DCPS Pre-K-12th grade students.

=== PAMM Library Pass ===
PAMM Library Pass in cooperation with Miami-Dade County Public Library Free entrance passes available from Miami-Dade Public Library

== Criticism ==
=== Renaming controversy ===
Criticism of the renaming of the museum after Pérez incited controversy, causing several board members to resign. Opponents of the move cite the fact that the new name is permanent with no opt-out clause and that the city and county taxpayers had paid for $100 million of the museum's capital campaign, compared to Pérez's $40 million gift. Additionally, there have been concerns that the new name could deter similar or greater donations, which could limit the growth of the museum's collection.
