= Divine Comedy (Charafeddine) =

Divine Comedy is an explorative work by Lebanese artist Chaza Charafeddine. Charafeddine created this series over a period spanning from 2018 to 2021 as a way to reimagine a classic tale through her own lens of experience. Charafeddine’s contemporary work combined photography, famous Islamic artworks, and her unique inclination to portray the personality of the model to result in a 23 part series depicting her version of an iconic story.

== About the piece ==
Chaza Charafeddine’s Divine Comedy is a series of 23 contemporary photo montages that use digital manipulation to place photographed human subjects onto famous Islamic artworks and the depiction of mythological beings. Specifically, the montages consist of 16th-18th century Persian miniatures, Islamic art from the Mughal period, and 1940ʻs Middle Eastern Pop-Art. Within these categories, Chaza Charafeddine features illustrated manuscripts, ceramics, portraits, and embroidery. The models are photographed in portraiture, and the final montages range from 22x32 cm to 150x100cm.

The series explores Persian and Mughal conceptions of gendered beauty in the 16th and 17th centuries, in which the aesthetics of beauty were largely feminine but could be applied to people of any sex. By imposing images of modern transgender women and feminine-presenting male subjects onto artwork from this period in Persion and Mughal history, Charafeddine calls attention to the existence of gender nonconformity long before the modern age and reminds the viewer that feminine beauty on male bodies has historically been not only accepted, but revered.

== Historical background ==
The name “Divine Comedy” is a reference to Dante Alighieriʻs narrative poem, Divine Comedy. Within Danteʻs poem, there are many similarities to the images in The Miraculous Journey of Mahomet, the book from which Charafeddine drew many illustrations for the series. The inspiration for Divine Comedy came to Charafeddine from books such as Pierre Centlivres and Micheline Centlivres-Demontʻs Imageries Populaires en Islam, Amina Okadaʻs Le grand Moghol et ses peintres, Miniaturistes de l'Inde au 16eme et 17eme siècles, and Marie Rose Seguyʻs The Miraculous Journey of Mahomet. Charafeddine was drawn to Mughal aesthetics and androgynous versus gendered depictions of Buraq, a mythical horse-like being believed to have flown the Prophet Muhammad to heaven during his night journey (Isra' and Mi'raj). Additionally, Charafeddine was inspired by the ways in which Arab female pop stars, such as Najwa Karam, are portrayed very similarly to Buraq.

== Production ==
Chaza Charafeddine photographed all homosexual male and transgender models for the project based on her inspiration from the indistinct gendering of the Buraq. Charafeddine’s process began by interviewing all of the models that heard about her project. After learning about the personalities and life experiences of each model, Charafeddine incorporated it into each model’s depiction through props and staging. Furthermore, many of the models were styled after their favorite celebrities or celebrity lookalikes, such as Carmen Maura and Haifa Wehbe.

== Public reception ==
Charafeddine’s Divine Comedy never received the backlash and criticism that was expected to come from the subversive series. Instead, the work was met with profound positive public response as it reimagined iconic themes of Islamic art and mythology through a new lens. Charafeddine credits this positive reception to the possibility that journalists were not aware of the represented Islamic mythological themes and the presence of the Prophet Muhammad, or avoided commenting on this aspect of the art in order to protect the gallery and themselves from negative publicity. All 23 works were sold from the series, despite the gallery in which the work was displayed neglecting to publish the images on its website.
