= Richard Meyer (academic) =

American art historian

Academic work
- Discipline: Art historian
- Institutions: Stanford University; University of Southern California
- Notable works: Outlaw Representation; What Was Contemporary Art?

Richard Meyer is the Robert and Ruth Halperin Professor in Art History at Stanford University.

Prior to joining Stanford, he was an associate professor of art history and fine arts at the University of Southern California. He is the author of Outlaw Representation: Censorship and Homosexuality in Twentieth-Century American Art and What Was Contemporary Art?. He is also a contributor to Artforum magazine. In 2013, he co-authored the book Art and Queer Culture with Catherine Lord.
