= Catherine Lord =

American artist, writer, and curator (born 1949)

Catherine Lord (born 1949) is an American artist, writer, and curator who explores themes of feminism, cultural politics, and colonialism. In 2010, she was awarded the Harvard Arts Medal.

== Early life and education ==
Born in Dominica, she attended a British boarding school in Barbados. When she was 13, she moved to Iowa with her family. While attending Radcliffe College, where she majored in English, she worked as a research assistant at the Schlesinger Library.

She earned her Master of Fine Arts degree in photography at the Visual Studies Workshop run through the University at Buffalo. Lord also edited Afterimage, a journal of photography, film, and video.

== Career ==
For seven years, Lord served as dean of the school of art at the California Institute of the Arts. From 1990 to 1995, she was the chair of the art department at the University of California, Irvine (UCI). She teaches at the Milton Avery School of the Arts at Bard College.

From 1991 to 1996, she was the director of the UCI Gallery. During her tenure, the gallery's exhibition lineup included And 22 Million Very Tired and Very Angry People by Carrie Mae Weems and Convergence: Eight Photographers by Deborah Willis.

She edited the catalogue for an exhibition of lesbian art called All but the Obvious. Lord has curated a number of exhibitions, including Pervert; Gender, Fucked (with Harmony Hammond); and Memories of Overdevelopment: Philippine Diaspora in Contemporary Visual Art (with Pamela Bailey, Cirilo Domine, Vicente Golveo, and Yong Soon Min).

In 2004 Lord published an experimental narrative, The Summer of Her Baldness: A Cancer Improvisation, in which she shares her experience of gender during chemotherapy. At the 2007 California Institute of the Arts feminist art symposium Exquisite Acts & Everyday Rebellions, Lord spoke on the panel "Strategies for Contemporary Feminism".

In 2021, she was one of the participants in John Greyson's experimental short documentary film International Dawn Chorus Day. Her work also includes a text and image project called The Effect of Tropical Light on White Men (2023).

== Recognition ==
In 2008, she was named the Shirley Carter Burden Visiting Professor of Photography at Harvard University. In 2010, she received the Harvard Arts Medal.

Lord has received fellowships from institutions including the New York State Council on the Arts, the University of California Humanities Research Institute, the Royal Botanic Gardens at Kew, the Norton Family Foundation, the Andy Warhol Foundation for the Visual Arts, Creative Capital, the Durfee Foundation, the Rockefeller Center, the California Community Foundation, and Anonymous Was A Woman.

== Publications ==
- The Summer of Her Baldness: A Cancer Improvisation (University of Texas Press, 2004). ISBN 978-0-292-70257-8
- Art and Queer Culture (in collaboration with Richard Meyer) (Phaidon Press, 2013). ISBN 978-0-7148-4935-5
- The Effect of Tropical Light on White Men (no place press, 2023). ISBN 978-1-949484-10-6
