= Leonard Baby =

American painter (born 1996)

- Born: 1996 (age 29–30)
- Occupation: Artist

Leonard Baby (born 1996) is an American painter based in New York City whose work examines themes of religion, gender identity and personal memory. His paintings often draw from cinematic imagery and autobiographical experiences, particularly his upbringing in a conservative Christian environment and his later reflections on queerness and identity.

== Early life and background ==
Baby was raised in Colorado in a religious community shaped by evangelical Christian parents. His environment had strict expectations around gender and sexuality, which would later inform many of the themes explored in his paintings. After his parents’ separation, his father became Director of Family Formations at the conservative Protestant organization Focus on the Family.

During adolescence, Baby was subjected to conversion therapy, an experience that later became a central point of reflection in his artistic work and most specifically in his exhibition titled "The Babys".

From an early age he showed an interest in drawing and painting, encouraged by his mother who provided art supplies and introduced him to art history through books and VHS about Impressionist painters.

Baby later moved to New York City, where he worked at the cinema Metrograph while continuing to develop his painting practice.

== Artistic style and themes ==
Baby's paintings frequently combine references to cinema, religious iconography and art historical traditions. his composition often depict quiet, suspended moments that evoke psychological tension and introspection.

the artist often revisits elements of Christian visual language from his upbringing, recontextualizing them through a queer perspective.

Many of his works also draw from personal experiences of religious repression and identity formation.
