= Chaza Charafeddine =

Lebanese artist

Chaza Charafeddine (born 1964) is a Lebanese artist and writer. Her work has explored themes including gender identity, cultural memory, and sexuality in the Middle East. Born in Tyre, Lebanon, she spent the early years of her career as a dancer before transitioning into visual art and writing. Her artistic practice engages with the socio-political dynamics in the region and reflects an exploration of identity and human experience.

Charafeddine's work spans a range of mediums, including painting, sculpture, photography and mixed media installations.

== Early life and education ==
Chaza Charafeddine was born in 1964 in Tyre, Lebanon. During her early childhood she was raised by her non-religious Shia family in Sierra Leone before returning to Lebanon to live with her grandmother.

She later studied in Europe, earning a diploma in curative education from 'La Branche, Centre de formation en pédagogie curative et sociothérapie' in Switzerland, followed by a diploma in eurythmy dance at the Eurythmie Schule Hamburg in Germany.

Charafeddine worked in dance for nearly a decade before leaving the field for health reasons and later pursuing writing and visual art.

== Career ==
After working in the dance world for almost a decade, she became a project and exhibitionist coordinator in the art world. Charafeddine worked on projects such as the DisORIENTation project at the House of World Cultures (HKW), and Home Works III at the Lebanese Association for Plastic (Ashkal Alwan). She now works as a visual artist and writer, with multiple works including 2012 novella, Flashback, and 2015 short-story collection, Haqibatun Bilkade Tura. She is currently represented by Agial Art/Saleh Barakat Gallery, and has now had a number of exhibitions that have been shown in galleries and art venues internationally.

== List of works ==
=== Exhibitions ===
- 2022-2023 Habibi, les révolutions de l'amour, Institut du monde Arabe, Paris
- 2022 Distant Divides, Halle 14, Zentrum für zeitgenössische Kunst, Leipzig
- 2021 Letter To The Father, Mina Image Centre, Beirut. The exhibition is a collaboration between MIC and Saleh Barakat Gallery, Beirut (solo)
- 2020 Where Have All the Jasmines Gone, ARTLABBERLIN, Berlin
- 2019 Phot'Aix, Festival Regards Croisés, Aix en Provence
- 2019 (Nothing) But Flowers, Saleh Barakat Gallery, Beirut
- 2019 Out Of Context, Saleh Barakat Gallery, Beirut
- 2019 Imagining Utopia - Performing Gender - Identities and Performativity, Berlin
- 2018 Maidames, Agial Art Gallery, Beirut (solo)
- 2018 Face Value: Portraiture | Saleh Barakat Gallery, Beirut
- 2016 Jardin d'orient, Institution du Monde Arabe, IMA, Paris,
- 2016 Aurubba 2200, Imago Mundi
- 2013 Fot'Aix, 2013, Regards Croisés, Fontaine Obscure, Aix En Provence
- 2012 Art is the Answer!, Villa Empain, Brussels
- 2011 Divine Comedy, Högkvarteret Gallery, Stockholm (solo)
- 2011 Contemporary Istanbul, Etemad Gallery | Dubai, Istanbul
- 2012 The Unbearable Lightness Of Witnessing, Studies For A Self-Portrait, Agial Art Gallery, Beirut (solo)
- 2011 Narrative photography, QContemporary, Beirut
- 2011 Concerning Angels, Janet Rady Fine Art, London
- 2010 Connecting Heavens, Green Art Gallery, Dubai
- 2010 FIAC, Paris
- 2010 Divine Comedy, Agial Art Gallery, Beirut (solo)

=== Books ===
- 2021 Beirut für wilde Mädchen, (novella, German) Edition Converso, Germany
- 2015 Divine Comedy, Plan Bey, Beirut
- 2015 Haqibatun Bilkade Tura, حقيبة بالكاد تُرى (short-story collection), Dar Al-Saqi, Beirut
- 2012 Flashback, فلاش باك (Novella), Dar Al-Saqi, Beirut
- 2002 Editor of Bi- Rout, a catalogue for the exhibition: Bi- Rout – Contemporary Art from Beirut

=== Performances ===
- 2014 The Unease Of Michel Samaha: An Intervention In A Court Case, with Roger Outa
- 2000 Angels, Men and Chickens, a street performance in Hamra Street, Beirut
- 1999 Alef Noun Alef, Eurythmy-Theater at the ‘Festival International de Danse Contemporaine CASA' 99', Casablanca, and at the 'Théâtre de Beyrouth', Beirut
- 1997 Hommage à Heinrich Heine, at the Goethe Institute, Beirut
