= Aïcha Snoussi =

Tunisian queer artist from Hammamet (born 1989)

Aïcha Snoussi (Arabic: عائشة سنوسي, born 1989) is a Tunisian queer artist from Hammamet.

== Biography ==
Snoussi was born in Tunis in 1989 and she began drawing at a very young age. She studied Fine Art at the Institut Supérieur des Beaux-Arts in Tunis, then studied for an MA in Fine Art at Paris-Sorbonne. She currently lives and works in Paris. Initially Snoussi trained as an engraver, but currently works in ink and paint, creating large-scale pieces of work reminiscent of Hieronymous Bosch or Georges Bataille. She is outspoken about the bias against women and people of colour within the art world. She was invited to speak on art and feminism at the Pompidou Centre in 2019.

=== Exhibitions ===
In 2017, Snoussi's work was shown in the Art Paris contemporary fair, which showcased many artists from across Africa. She exhibited her body of work Le Livre des anomalies, which is an extensive narrative of illustrations drawn into faded exercise books. These works invited visitors to add to them and Snoussi is interested in breaking down the division in gallery space between artist and viewer. Snoussi's 2016 exhibition at the Tunisian Embsassy in London, explored the monstrous and featured large-scale illustration drawn directly to the embassy walls in red. Sexuality and the body is an important part of Snoussi's work, which is defined by its intertwining of the themes of science and mysticism. Paper is treated like abused skin through cutting, puncturing and drawing. She has exhibited her work consistently since 2013, with exhibitions, amongst others, in: Climbing through the Tide (Tunis, 2019), Galerie LaLalande (Paris, 2019), Art Brussels (2018), Somerset House (London, 2017), Platform Parallel (Tunis, 2016), Cité Internationale des arts (Paris, 2015), Jazz Festival (Carthage, 2014), Galerie Yahia (Tunis, 2013).

=== LGBTQ* Art in Tunisia ===
Snoussi's queer identity is also important in the expression of her work. She explores how the monstrous visions in her work relate to create queer alternatives to the authoritarian Tunisian state. In 2019, she was one of thirteen artists chosen to exhibit in Paris to mark International Day Against Homophobia. Her mix of monstrosity and queerness acts to confound Tunisian traditional values. Queerness only emerged in women's art in Tunisia in the 2010s and Snoussi is at the forefront of its development.
