= Youssef Nabil =

Egyptian photographer (born 1972)

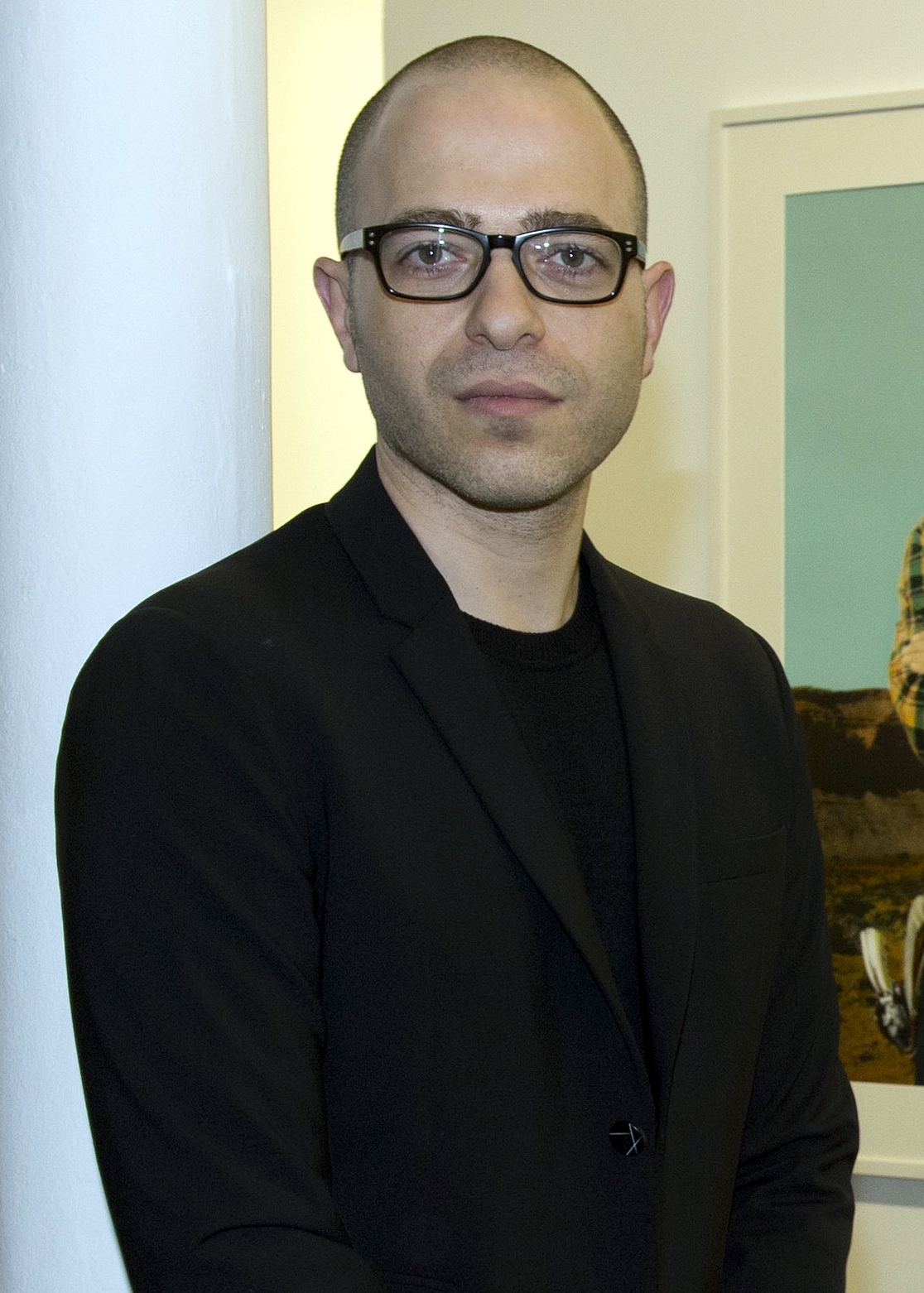
- Youssef Nabil
- Born: November 6, 1972 (age 53); Cairo, Egypt
- Website: youssefnabil.com

Youssef Nabil (born 6 November 1972) is an Egyptian artist and photographer.

== Background ==
Born in Cairo, Egypt, Nabil started his photography career in 1992, shortly before leaving to New York and Paris to work in prominent photographers' studios. In 1999, Youssef Nabil had his first solo exhibition in Cairo. Through the years he remained a close friend of the Egyptian-Armenian studio portrait photographer Van Leo (Leon Boyadjian, 1921–2001), who encouraged Nabil to leave to the West. In 2003, Youssef Nabil was awarded the Seydou Keita Prize in the Biennial of African Photography in Bamako.

In 2001, while visiting Cairo, British artist Tracey Emin discovered Nabil's work and later nominated him as a future top artist in Harper's article Tomorrow People. Nabil left Egypt in 2003 for an artist residency at the Cité internationale des arts in Paris. In 2006, he moved to live and work in New York.

Many have been subject to Nabil's lens and distinctive technique of hand-colouring gelatin silver prints, including artists Tracey Emin, Gilbert and George, Nan Goldin, Marina Abramović, Louise Bourgeois, and Shirin Neshat; singers Alicia Keys, Sting (musician), and Natacha Atlas; actors Robert De Niro, Omar Sharif, Faten Hamama, Rossy de Palma, Charlotte Rampling, Isabelle Huppert, and Catherine Deneuve.

In 2010, Nabil wrote, produced and directed his first film You Never Left, an 8-minute short film with actors Fanny Ardant and Tahar Rahim. It is set in an allegorical place that is a metaphor of a lost Egypt, sketching an intimate and solemn parallel between exile and death. This video in which he reverently and inventively revisits the characteristics of Egyptian cinema’s golden age, with its movie stars and Technicolor film stock, he reconnects with the source and inspiration of his photographic imagery with which it shares the same personal, diaristic quality.

In 2015, Nabil produced his second video, I Saved My Belly Dancer, with actors Salma Hayek and Tahar Rahim, a narration around his fascination with the tradition of belly dancers and the disappearance of the art form that is unique to the Middle East. The 12-minute video also explores shifting perceptions of women in the Arab world and the tensions between the amplified sexualisation of their bodies and the continued repression of women in modern Arab society. I Saved My Belly Dancer is featured in the collection of the Pérez Art Museum Miami, Florida.

Nabil's work has been presented on numerous international solo and group exhibitions, at venues including the British Museum, London; Galleria dell'Accademia, Florence, The Los Angeles County Museum of Art, LACMA, MMK Museum für Modern Kunst, Frankfurt, MASP Museu de Arte de São Paulo, IVAM Institut Valencià d'Art Modern, Valencia, Museum of Anthropology, Vancouver, La Maison Rouge, Paris, Centro de la Imagen, Mexico City; North Carolina Museum of Art, Raleigh; BALTIC Centre for Contemporary Art, Newcastle, MACBA Centre de Cultura Contemporánea de Barcelona, Gemäldegalerie, Staatliche Museen zu Berlin, Museum of Photography, Thessaloniki, Victoria & Albert Museum, London, Biennale of the Visual Arts of Santa Cruz, Kunstmuseum, Bonn, Smithsonian National Museum of African Art, Washington, D.C, Institut du Monde Arabe, Paris; Savannah College of Art and Design, Savannah; Kunstmuseum, Bonn; The Third Line, Dubai; Galerist, Istanbul; Nathalie Obadia gallery, Paris; Yossi Milo gallery, New York; Centro Andaluz de Arte Contemporáneo, Sevilla; Aperture Foundation, New York, Villa Medici, Rome and Palazzo Grassi, Venice.

Youssef Nabil is part of various international collections including Collection François Pinault, Paris; LACMA Museum, Los Angeles; LVMH The Louis Vuitton Foundation, Paris; Sindika Dokolo Foundation, Luanda, La Maison Européenne de la Photographie, Paris; the joint collection of The British Museum and The Victoria & Albert Museum, London; SCAD Museum of Art, Savannah, GA, Centro de la Imagen, Mexico City; Mathaf Arab Museum of Modern Art, Doha; the Guggenheim Museum, Abu Dhabi; The Studio Museum in Harlem, New York and PAMM, Pérez Art Museum Miami.

Four monographs have been published on Youssef Nabil's work – Sleep in My Arms (Autograph ABP and Michael Stevenson, 2007), I Won't Let You Die (Hatje Cantz, 2008), Youssef Nabil ( Flammarion, 2013) and Once Upon A Dream ( Marsilio, 2020).

Nabil lives and works in Paris and New York City.

== Films ==
- You Never Left (2010) with Fanny Ardant and Tahar Rahim
- I Saved My Belly Dancer (2015) with Salma Hayek and Tahar Rahim
- Arabian Happy Ending (2016)
- The Beautiful Voyage (2021) with Charlotte Rampling and Youssef Nabil

== Selected exhibitions ==
=== Selected solo exhibitions ===
- 1999 – Premiere, Cairo-Berlin Art Gallery, Cairo, Egypt
- 2001 – Obsesiones, Centro de la Imagen, Mexico City, Mexico
- 2001 – Youssef Nabil, Townhouse Gallery of Contemporary Art, Cairo, Egypt
- 2003 – Pour un Moment d'Éternité, Rencontres Internationales de la Photographie, Arles, France
- 2007 – Portraits / Self-portraits, The Third Line Gallery, Dubai, U.A.E.
- 2007 – Sleep in my arms, Michael Stevenson Gallery, Cape Town, South Africa
- 2008 – CINEMA, Michael Stevenson Gallery, Cape Town, South Africa
- 2009 – I Live Within You, Savannah College of Art and Design-SCAD, Atlanta, U.S.
- 2009 – I Will Go to Paradise, The Third Line Gallery, Dubai, U.A.E.
- 2009 – I Won't Let you Die, Villa Medici, Rome, Italy
- 2009 – Youssef Nabil, GALERIST, Istanbul, Turkey
- 2009 – Youssef Nabil, Volker Diehl Gallery, Berlin, Germany
- 2010 – I Live Within You, Savannah College of Art and Design-SCAD, Savannah, U.S.
- 2010 – Youssef Nabil, Yossi Milo Gallery, New York, U.S.
- 2011 – You Never Left, Nathalie Obadia Gallery, Paris, France
- 2012 – Youssef Nabil, Maison Européenne de la Photographie, Paris, France
- 2013 – Time of Transformation, The Third Line Gallery, Dubai. U.A.E.
- 2017 – Deep Roots, Nathalie Obadia Gallery, Brussels, Belgium
- 2017 – I Saved My Belly Dancer, Pérez Art Museum PAMM, Miami
- 2019 – Youssef Nabil, Institut du Monde Arabe, Tourcoing, France
- 2020 – Youssef Nabil, Once Upon A Dream, Palazzo Grassi, Venice, Italy
- 2025 – I Saved My Belly Dancer, Los Angeles County Museum of Art LACMA, Los Angeles, U.S.

=== Selected group exhibitions ===
- 2003 – Rites sacrés, Rites profanes, Rencontres Africaines de la Photographie, Bamako, Mali
- 2004 – Bamako 03: Contemporary African Photography, Centre de Cultura Contemporània de Barcelona MACBA, Barcelona, Spain
- 2004 – Nazar: Noorderlicht, The Fries Museum, Leeuwaarden, The Netherlands
- 2004 – Rites sacrés, Rites profanes: Zeitgenossiche Afrikanische Fotographie, Kornhausforum, Bern, Switzerland
- 2004 – Staged Realities: Exposing the Soul in African Photography 1870–2004, Michael Stevenson Contemporary Gallery, Cape Town, South Africa
- 2005 – Arab Eyes, FotoFest Houston, Texas, U.S.
- 2005 – L'Égypte, Saline Royale d'Arc et Senans, France
- 2005 – Nazar, Photographs from the Arab World, The Aperture Foundation Gallery, New York, U.S.
- 2005 – Regards des Photographes Arabes Contemporains, Institut du Monde Arabe, Paris, France
- 2006 – 19 miradas. Fotógrafos árabes contemporáneos, Centro Andaluz de Arte Contemporáneo, Sevilla, Spain
- 2006 – Arabiske Blikke, GL Strand Museum, Copenhagen, Denmark
- 2006 – Images of the Middle East, Danish Center for Culture and Development, Copenhagen, Denmark
- 2006 – Word into Art, The British Museum, London, U.K.
- 2007 – Dialogues Méditerranéens, Saint-Tropez, France
- 2007 – Gegenwart aus Jahrtausenden, Zeitgenössische Kunst aus Ägypten, Kunstmuseum, Bonn, Germany
- 2008 – Disguise, Michael Stevenson Gallery, Cape Town, South Africa
- 2008 – Far From Home, North Carolina Museum of Art NCMA, North Carolina, U.S.
- 2008 – Last of the Dictionary Men, BALTIC Centre for Contemporary Art, Newcastle, U.K.
- 2008 – Perfect Lovers, Art Extra, Johannesburg, South Africa
- 2008 – Portraits II, Galeria Leme, São Paulo, Brazil
- 2008 – Regards des Photographes Arabes Contemporains, Musée National d'Art Moderne et Contemporain MNAMC, Alger, Algeria
- 2009 – ARABESQUE, Arts of The Arab World, The Kennedy Center, Washington DC, U.S.
- 2009 – Unconditional Love, The Venice Biennale – 53rd International Art Exhibition, Venice, Italy
- 2010 – Portraits, Galerie Nathalie Obadia, Brussels, Belgium
- 2010 – Told, Untold, Retold, Mathaf Arab Museum of Modern Art, Doha, Qatar
- 2011 – Facing Mirrors, Museum of Photography, Thessaloniki, Greece
- 2011 – Of Women's Modesty and Anger, Boghossian Foundation, Brussels, Belgium
- 2012 – Édouard et Cléopâtre, Égyptomanies depuis le XIXe siècle, Boghossian Foundation, Brussels, Belgium
- 2012 – Light from the Middle East: New Photography, Victoria & Albert Museum, London, U.K.
- 2012 – Pose/Re-Pose: Figurative Works Then and Now, SCAD Museum of Art, Savannah, Georgia, U.S.
- 2012 – Tea with Nefertiti, Mathaf Arab Museum of Modern Art, Doha, Qatar
- 2012 – The Royal Academy of Arts Encounter, Cultural Village Foundation Katara, Doha, Qatar
- 2013 – Ici, Ailleurs, Friche la Belle de Mai, Marseille, France
- 2013 – Matisse à Nice, Palmiers, Palmes et Palmettes, Musée Masséna, Nice, France
- 2013 – Safar Voyage, Museum of Anthropology, Vancouver, Canada
- 2013 – Sous Influences, Arts Plastiques et Psychotropes, La Maison Rouge, Paris, France
- 2013 – Tea with Nefertiti, IVAM Institut Valencia d'Art Modern, Valencia, Spain
- 2014 – Ri-conoscere Michelangelo, Galleria dell'Accademia, Florence, Italy
- 2014 – The Divine Comedy, Heaven, Hell, Purgatory Revisited by Contemporary African Artists, MMK Museum für Modern Kunst, Frankfurt, Germany
- 2014 – The Divine Comedy, Heaven, Hell, Purgatory Revisited by Contemporary African Artists, SCAD Museum of Art, Savannah, Georgia, U.S.
- 2015 – Home Ground, Aga Khan Museum of Art, Toronto, Canada
- 2015 – Islamic Art Now: Contemporary Art of the Middle East. The Los Angeles County Museum of Art, LACMA, LA, U.S.
- 2015 – The Botticelli Renaissance, Gemäldegalerie, Staatliche Museen zu Berlin, Berlin, Germany
- 2015 – The Divine Comedy: Heaven, Purgatory, and Hell Revisited by Contemporary African Artists. Smithsonian National Museum of African Art, Washington, D.C, U.S.
- 2016 – Botticelli Reimagined, Victoria and Albert Museum, London, UK
- 2016 – Dream Light, Pérez Art Museum Miami (PAMM), Miami, U.S.
- 2016 – Hips Don't Lie, Centre Pompidou Málaga, Spain
- 2016 – Looking at the World Around You, Fundación Banco Santander, Madrid, Spain
- 2016 – Portrait of the Artist as an Alter, FRAC Haute-Normandie, France
- 2016 – The Blue Hour, Centro Cultural de Santa Cruz, Biennale of the Visual Arts of Santa Cruz, Bolivia
- 2017 – A Painting Today, Stevenson Gallery, Cape Town, South Africa
- 2017 – Hips Don't Lie, Centre Pompidou Paris, France
- 2018 – Al Musiqa, Cité de la Musique – Philharmonie de Paris, Paris, France
- 2018 – Beyond Words, 4th Mardin Biennial, Turkey
- 2018 – BOTH, AND. Stevenson Gallery, Cape Town, South Africa
- 2018 – The Shapes of Birds: Contemporary Art of the Middle East and North Africa, Newport Art Museum, Rhode Island, U.S.
- 2019 – The 13th International Cairo Biennale, Cairo, Egypt
- 2020 – Histories of Dance, MASP Museu de Arte de São Paulo, São Paulo, Brazil
- 2020 – Orientalisms, IVAM Institut Valencià d'Art Modern, Valencia, Spain

== Publications ==
- Sleep in My Arms. Cape Town: Michael Stevenson. 2007.
- Sleep in My Arms. London: Autograph ABP. 2007.
- I Won't Let You Die. Germany: Hatje Cantz Verlag. 2008. ISBN 978-3-7757-2306-0.
- Youssef Nabil. France: Flammarion. 2013. ISBN 978-2-08-130111-5.
- Once Upon A Dream. Italy: Marsilio. 2020.
