= Yasmine K. Kasem =

American visual artist (born 1993)

Yasmine K. Kasem (born May 1993) is an American visual artist, whose practice centers on sculpture and installation.

== Early life and education ==
Yasmine K. Kasem was born May 1993, in Kokomo, Indiana. She is of a mixed ethnic heritage, and half Egyptian, and she was raised Muslim. Kasem is queer.

In 2015, she received a Bachelor of Fine Arts degree from Herron School of Art and Design at Indiana University, as well as Purdue University Indiana. In 2019, she received a Master of Fine Arts degree at the University of California, San Diego. During her graduate studies at UC San Diego, Kasem developed large-scale sculptural installations informed by spatial intervention and material experimentation.

== Career and practice ==
Kasem's work reaches to domestic and international audiences, her work being exhibited in Los Angeles, New York City, San Diego, Santa Ana, San Juan, Puerto Rico, and Mexico. Her practice engages sculpture and installation, often incorporating material experimentation and spatial intervention. Her work addresses themes of memory, place, and social structures through sculptural form.

In effort to bring together fellow female artists that resided in Indianapolis, Kasem co-founded The Working Girls Artist Collective in Indianapolis. The collective was formed to support collaboration and visibility among women artists working in the Indianapolis area.

Kasem's sculpture Sweat Until I am Soaked (2022), is composed of three colorful buraqs with her own face attached to them, serves as a commentary on finding space for her own identity as a queer Muslim to exist in the open.

== Exhibitions, awards and recognition ==
- Awarded the International Sculpture Center's Outstanding Student Achievement Award in 2015, which recognizes emerging artists demonstrating excellence in contemporary sculpture
- In 2018, Kasem's artworks were featured in the atrium in the San Juan Islands Museum of Art (SJIMA), a museum located in Washington State
