= Diana Davies (photographer) =

American photographer (born 1938)

Diana Davies (born 1938) is an American photographer, playwright, painter, graphic artist, illustrator, and musician who was one of the leading photojournalists documenting the feminist and gay liberation movements of the 1960s and '70s. Her photographs cover the early days of diverse women's and LGBT social movements, as well as the Civil Rights, Peace, and farmworkers' rights movements.

== Early life ==
Born in 1938, Davies was raised in Maine, the Catskills region of New York State, New York City, and Boston. Her grandparents were union organizers and Debs socialists — Davies credits her family background with influencing her later activist work.

Davies left high school at 16 and worked as a waitress and dishwasher while pursuing a musical career.

== Career ==
In the 1960s, Davies became involved in photography during her work with theatre and music, and began her work using equipment purchased at a yard sale. She taught herself how to develop and print her own photos, and began her photography work shooting behind-the-scenes images at theaters.

Davies began working with Agnes "Sis" Cunningham and Gordon Friesen, editors of Broadside magazine. Through her contact with them (and based on her family background), she developed an interest in human rights work.

Davies photographed numerous pivotal moments in music and social justice movements throughout the 1960s and 1970s, including the Poor People's March on Washington, Newport Folk Festival, and the Philadelphia Folk Festival. She photographed the Smithsonian Folklife Festival during its early years. In addition to her work in the United States, she has photographed Central America, Africa, Europe, and the Middle East.

From the 1960s through the 1980s, her work appeared in such publications as Life, The New York Times, and The Boston Globe. Davies aligned herself with the Gay Liberation Front and contributed images to Come Out!, a magazine published by the GLF. She documented the first [Pride Parade] in New York City on 28 June 1970.

In the 1990s, she shifted her focus to illustration, painting and graphic art and largely ceased working as a photographer.

Davies writes plays with social justice themes, having throughout her life participated in and supported all aspects of "people's theatre."

As of 2018, Davies was living in Northampton, Massachusetts. She continues to perform in musical groups — including as percussionist for the group Flame n Peach and the Liberated Waffles.

== Collections ==
Davies' work is housed in the Ralph Rinzler Folklife Archives and Collections located in the Smithsonian Center for Folklife and Cultural Heritage, the New York Public Library, Howard University, the Greenwich Village Society for Historic Preservation, the Sophia Smith Collection at Smith College, and the Swarthmore College Peace Collection. Additionally, The New York Public Library holds some of her materials.

== Works ==
Books

- Photojourney: Photographs (1989), Belfast, Me.: Bag Lady Press. ISBN 0962243205

Plays

- The Witch Papers (1980)
- The War Machine (1998)

Discography

- Twelve o'clock girl in a nine o'clock town (1996), Red Hot Records (cassette)

== See also ==
- Leonard Fink
