= Street Orphans (gang) =

Lesbian gang from San Francisco, CA

The Street Orphans were a gang of lesbian youth formed in Tenderloin, San Francisco. They participated in the Compton's Cafeteria Riot in 1966, and, along with the gay youth organization Vanguard, helped form San Francisco's chapters of the Gay Liberation Front and the Gay Activists Alliance.
