= Donna Personna =

American dramatist (born 1946)

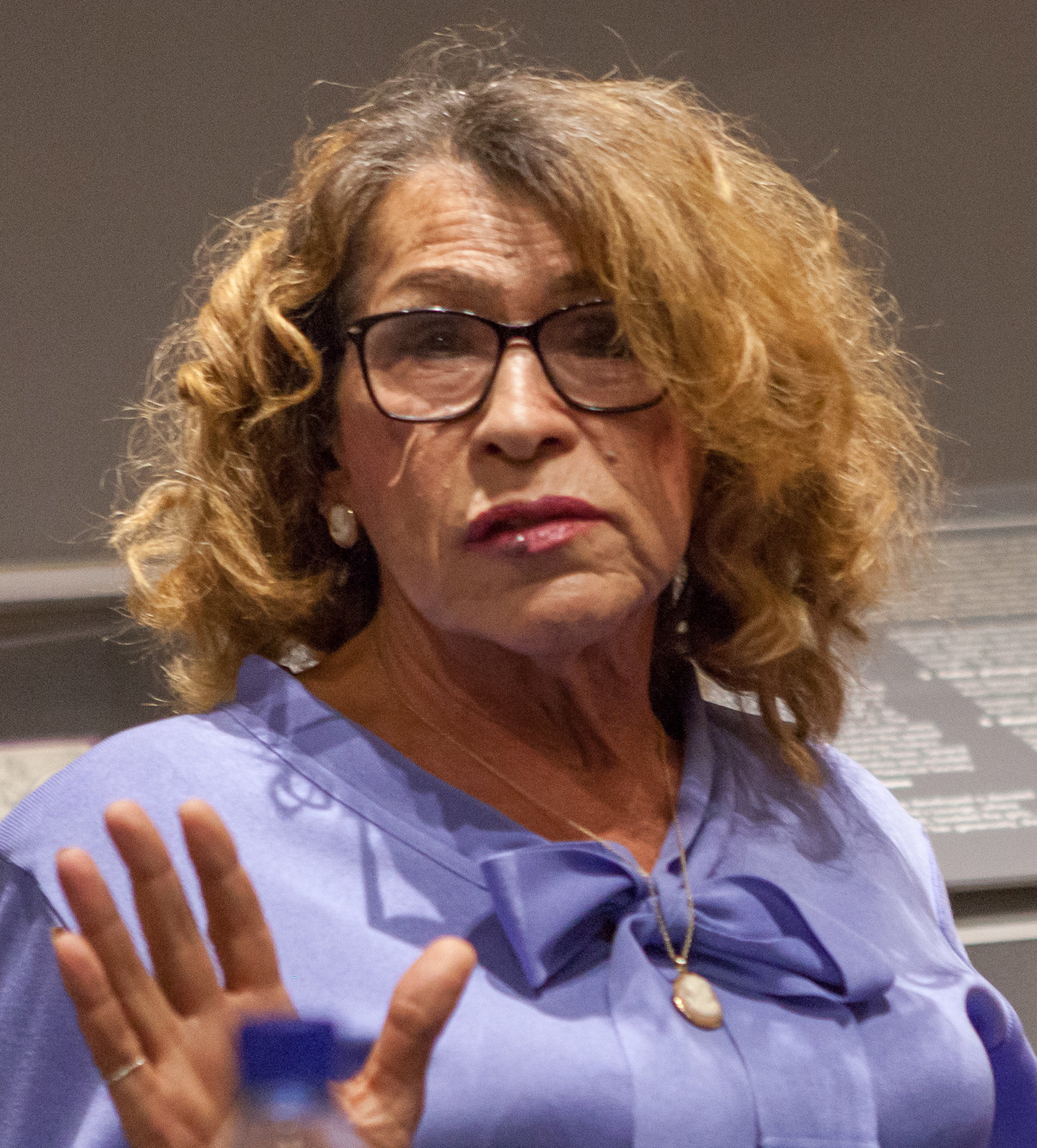
Donna Personna in 2018

Donna Personna (born 1946) is a transgender rights activist and fine art artist, who focuses in photography, painting, and mixed media. Personna was friends with The Cockettes and she played a part in Elevator Girls in Bondage. Personna co-wrote a play about the Compton Cafeteria riot, one of the first recorded LGBT-related riots in United States history, and marking the beginning of transgender activism in San Francisco.

== Biography ==
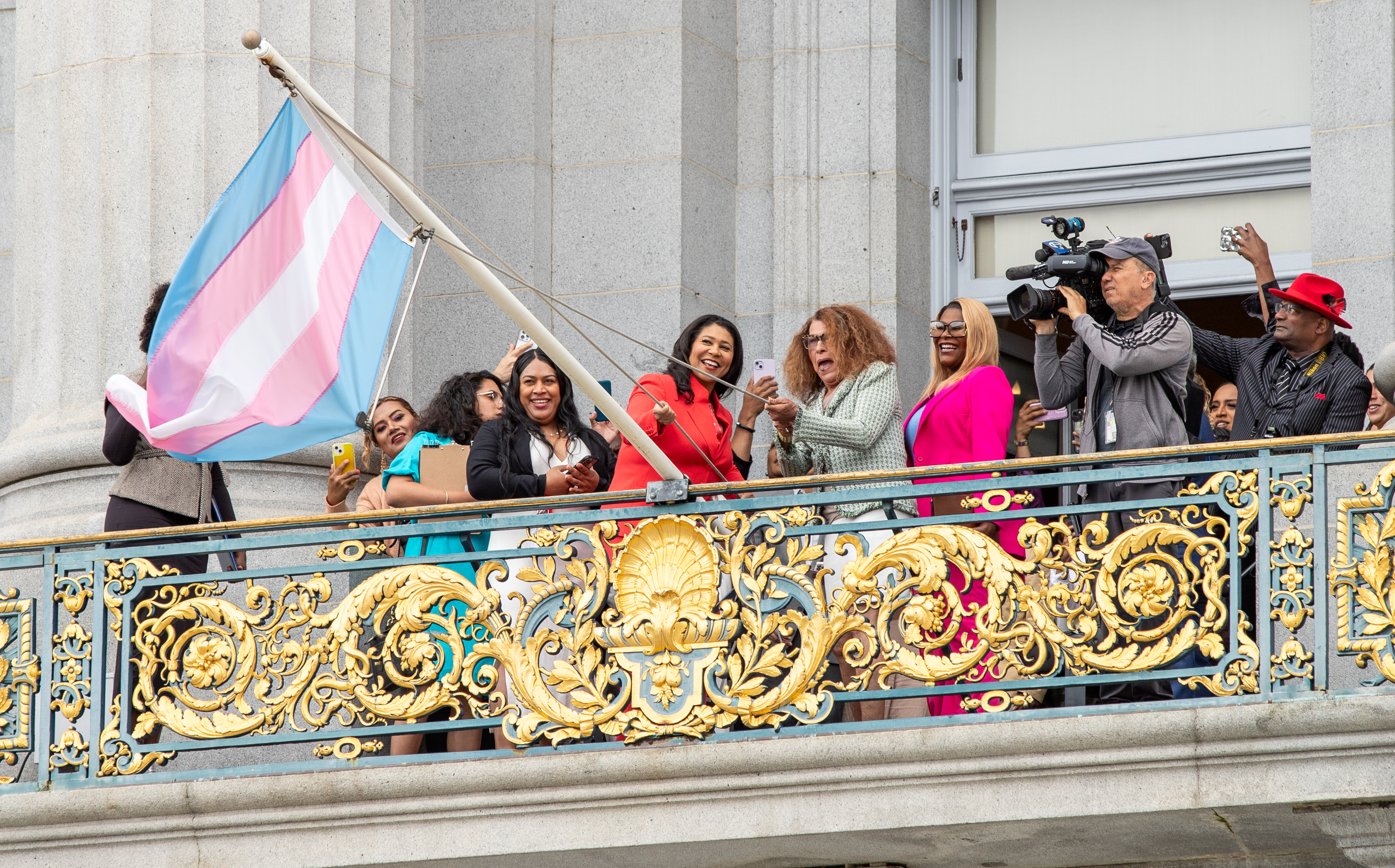
Personna and San Francisco Mayor London Breed raise the trans pride flag outside City Hall, 2023.

Personna was born in Texas in 1946, the youngest of the 13 children of a Mexican-American minister and his wife. She then moved to San Jose, California, at the age of one and moved to San Francisco at age 19.

Personna has served on the boards of the San Francisco Trans March and the San Francisco Transgender Day of Remembrance.

In 2018, she raised San Francisco's first transgender flag at San Francisco City Hall with Mayor London Breed. In 2019, she was a grand marshal of the San Francisco Pride Parade.

== Filmography ==
Personna was the subject of the 2013 Iris Prize-winning short film My Mother and was featured in the 2014 film Beautiful by Night. She was interviewed for the 2018 documentary, Ruminations.

Personna's story is a major part of The Compton's Cafeteria Riot, an interactive play produced by the Tenderloin Museum.

Personna is the subject of the 2022 documentary Donna, directed by Jay Bedwani.
