= The Loin's Mouth =

Semi-quarterly San Francisco neighborhood publication

The Loin's Mouth was a semi-quarterly, Tenderloin-based publication about life in the San Francisco Tenderloin and Tendernob area. It was conceived of by its editor, Rachel Mills, in the Spring of 2006 and released eight issues through the Spring of 2009. Articles were generally humorous and typically revolved around a central theme of each issue, such as "Love in the Loin" (released in February 2007). Content ranged from fake news stories to editorial pieces to short stories with such titles as "One Night Stand," "Friday Night Fights," and "I, Drunkard." Contributors varied dramatically in age, background, and education. Maxon Crumb (brother of R. Crumb) had submitted several illustrations.

At its height, The Loin's Mouth had a circulation of approximately 6,000 and was distributed free-of-charge in bars, cafes, and bookstores in the Tenderloin, SOMA, the Mission District, and on Polk Street, as well as at City Lights Bookstore in North Beach and Amoeba Records in the Upper Haight.

== Awards ==
The Loin's Mouth was an editor's pick for "Best Neighborhood Rag" in the SF Weekly's "Best of SF" issue and won the reader's poll for "Best Local Zine (Print)" in the SF Bay Guardian's annual "Best of the Bay" issue for 2008.

== See also ==
- Tenderloin
- The Tender
