= Felicia Elizondo =

American transgender activist (1946–2021)

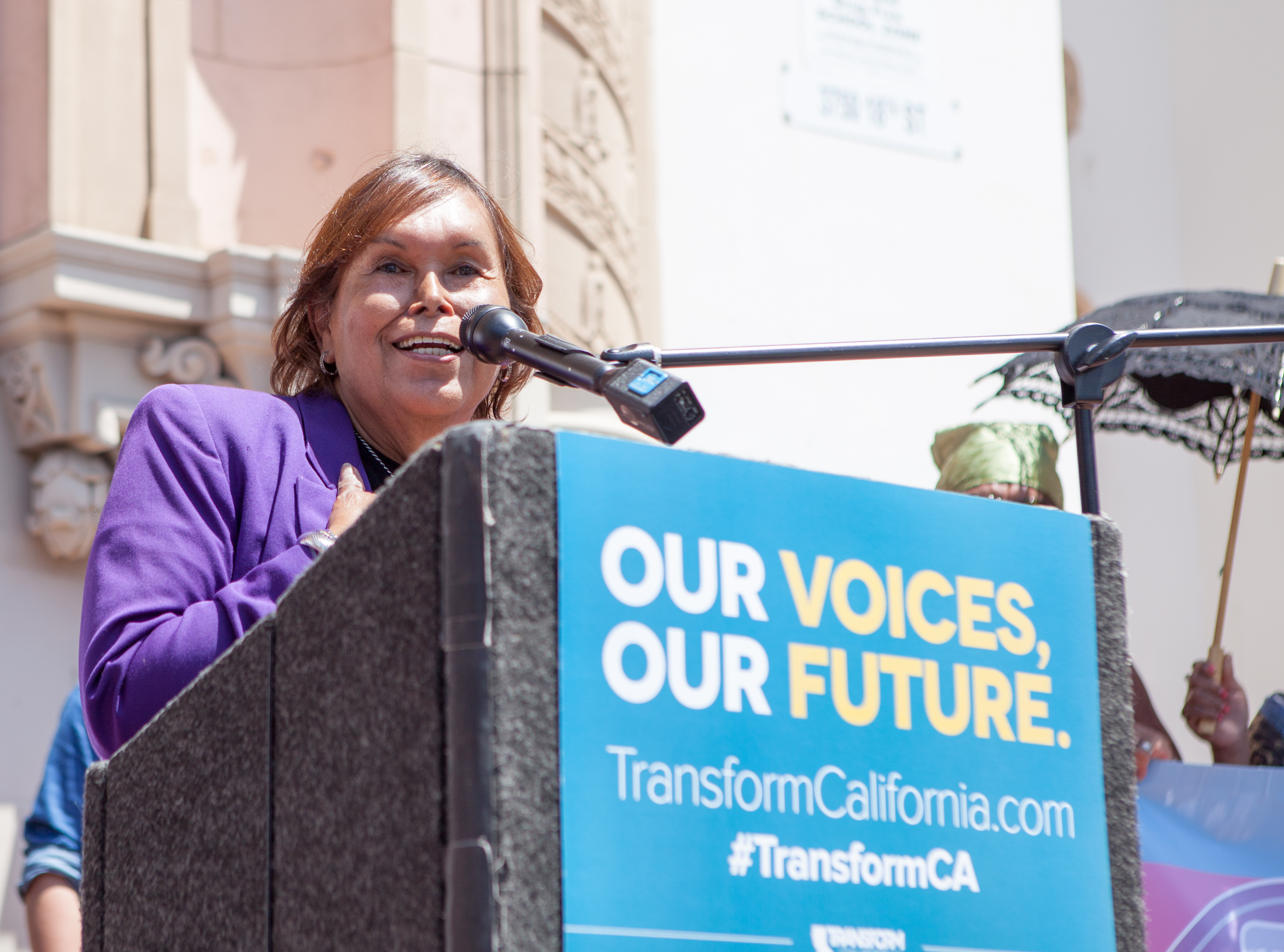
- Felicia "Flames" Elizondo speaks at a Transform California launch event.
- Born: July 23, 1946; San Angelo, Texas, U.S.
- Died: May 15, 2021 (aged 74); San Francisco, California, U.S.
- Known for: LGBTQ activism
- Website: feliciaflames.com

Felicia Elizondo (July 23, 1946 – May 15, 2021) was an American transgender woman with a long history of activism on behalf of the LGBT community. She was a regular at Gene Compton's Cafeteria in San Francisco during the time of the Compton's Cafeteria riot, a historic LGBT community uprising.

== Early life ==
Assigned male at birth in San Angelo, Texas, Elizondo struggled with bullying, molestation, and gender identity issues. Her father, a sheepherder, died when she was three years old. From the age of five, she knew that she was "different". At age 14, she moved to San Jose, California, with a gay man, and began to spend time in the Tenderloin neighborhood of San Francisco in her teens.

At age 18, Elizondo joined the U.S. Navy and volunteered to serve in the Vietnam War, thinking she would either get killed or come to terms with her gender identity: "If the military doesn't make me a man, nothing will." After serving in Vietnam for six months, she confessed that she was gay. She was interrogated by the FBI, and dishonorably discharged in 1965. She later successfully petitioned to have her discharge changed to honorable.

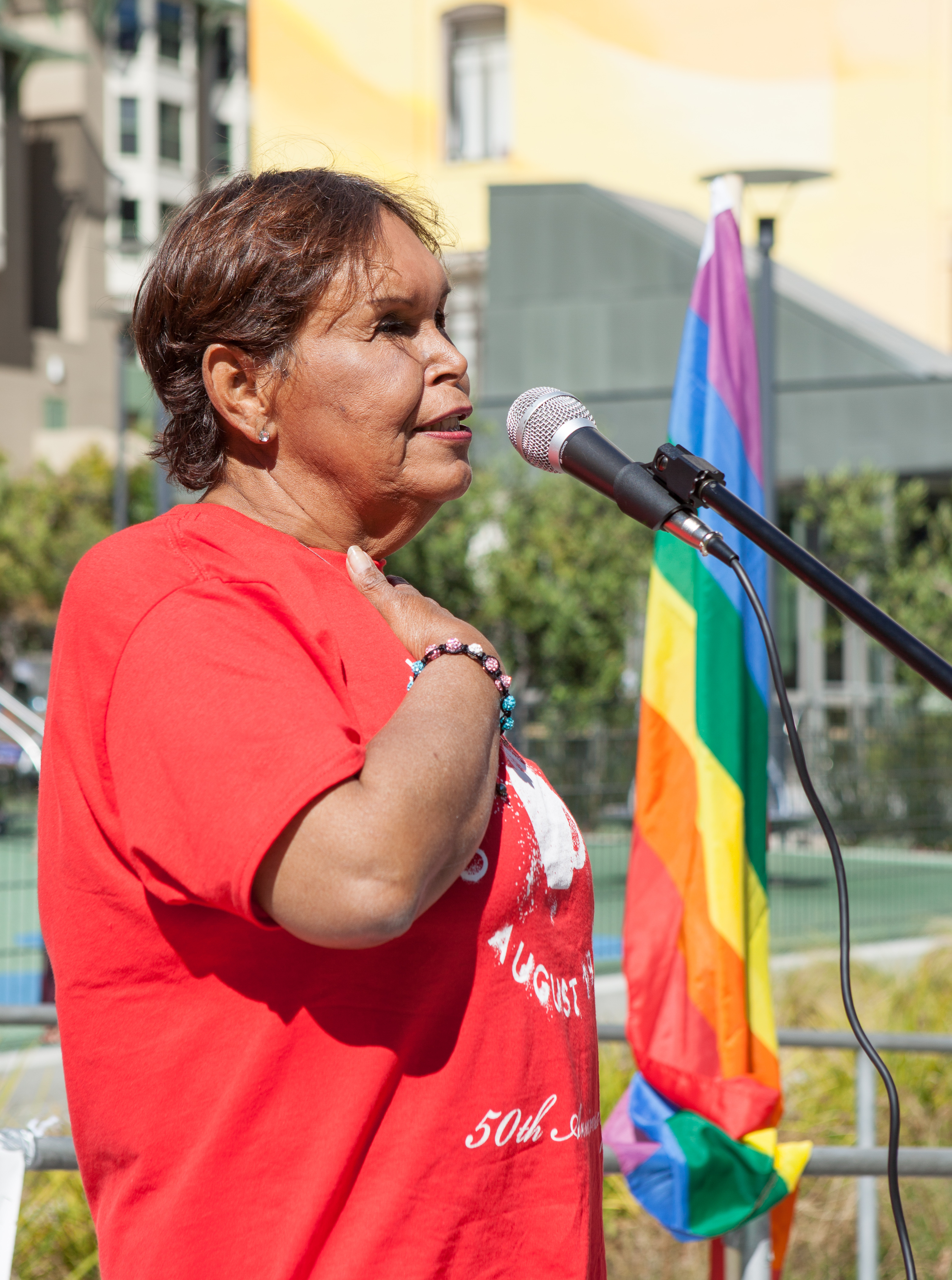
Elizondo speaking at an August 2016 event in San Francisco

== Activism and career ==
In the 1960s, Elizondo was a patron of Gene Compton's Cafeteria in San Francisco, where the Compton's Cafeteria riot, an LGBT community uprising, occurred in 1966, three years before the Stonewall riots in New York City. She was featured in Screaming Queens: The Riot at Compton's Cafeteria, a 2005 documentary co-directed and produced by Susan Stryker and Victor Silverman.

Elizondo transitioned to female in 1974, while working as a long-distance operator. She worked at a number of other jobs, including receptionist, clerk, and nurse's aid. She was also a sex worker for a time. She performed as a drag queen for charity, and at gay clubs under the name Felicia Flames.

Elizondo was diagnosed as HIV positive in 1987. She worked for non-profit organizations, including P.A.W.S., Shanti Project, and the San Francisco AIDS Foundation, that seek to improve quality of life for people living with serious illnesses. She contributed panels to the AIDS Memorial Quilt, and helped raise funds for non-profits including Project Open Hand and the San Francisco LGBT Community Center. As a Latina, she worked with other transgender women of color to combat racism in the community.

Elizondo moved to San Francisco permanently in 1991. In 2014, she worked with San Francisco supervisor Jane Kim to get the 100 block of Turk Street renamed to Vicki Mar Lane in honor of her late friend, drag performer Vicki Marlane. In 2016, she again worked with Kim to rename the 100 block of Taylor Street to Gene Compton's Cafeteria Way. Elizondo appeared at a number of events in 2016 to commemorate the 50th anniversary of the Compton's Cafeteria riot.

Elizondo served as the lifetime achievement grand marshal in the 2015 San Francisco Pride Parade.

== Death ==
Elizondo died on May 15, 2021, in San Francisco, at 74 years old.
