= Donna Rose =

Donna Rose may refer to:

- Donna Rose (rugby union), Welsh rugby union player
- Donna Rose (activist), American transgender rights activist and author

== See also ==
- Donna Rose Addis, New Zealand psychology academic
- Doña Rosa, Mexican ceramics artisan
