= Miquel Hudin =

American journalist

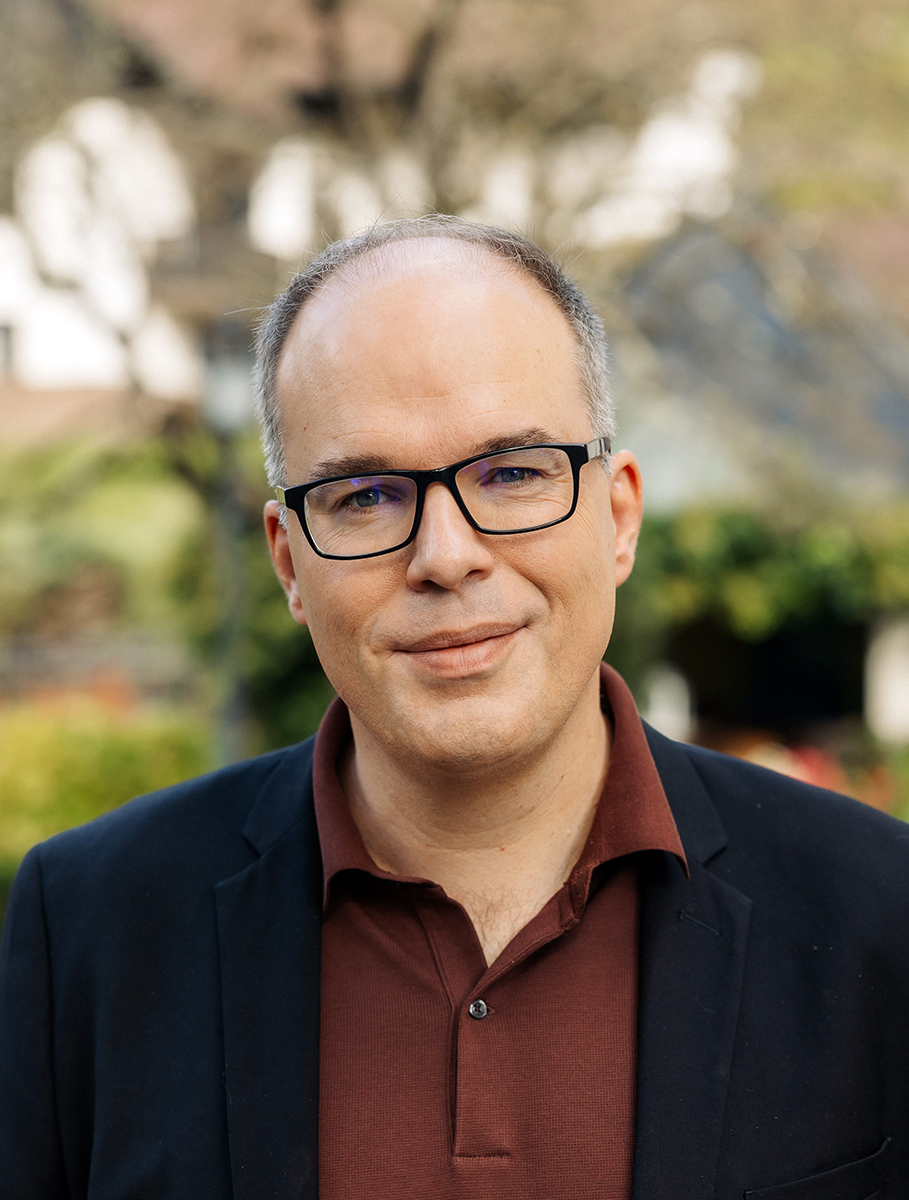
- Born: Oroville, California, U.S.
- Citizenship: American, Croatian
- Education: University of California, Berkeley
- Occupation: Writer
- Writing career
- Language: English, Catalan
- Website: www.hudin.com

Miquel Hudin is an American-Croatian writer based in Catalonia, Spain. He created a series of wine travel books called, Vinologue in 2008. He additionally writes for his website, Hudin.com since its launch in 2011.

== Biography ==
Originally from the interior of Northern California, Miquel moved to San Francisco for university and while there, started working for the Inglenook winery in Napa Valley in 1999. He worked in various other wine trade capacities including an importer of Central European wines which lead to a growing interest in wine.

After traveling extensively around the present-day countries of Former Yugoslavia, he founded the Vinologue series in 2008. The premise of the books was to bridge the gap between traditional travel guidebooks and large, glossy wine books to make various wine regions as approachable as possible to wine drinkers of any level.

Since moving to Catalonia, Spain in 2012, he has been a regular contributor to Decanter, The World of Fine Wine, Harpers Wine & Spirit, Guild of Sommeliers, Wine & Spirits, JancisRobinson.com, and the Catalan language publications, Vadevi and Cupatges. He is a regular judge in international wine competitions such as the Decanter World Wine Awards and he leads wine courses. He is also very active in promoting the quality wines of boutique cellars from both DOQ Priorat as well as DO Montsant.

He was selected as the recipient of the Geoffrey Roberts Award for his book on the wines for the Republic of Georgia that was released in 2017. He was also named "Best Drink Writer of the Year" in the annual Fortnum & Mason Awards.

== Other ventures ==
Miquel was one of the original developers and eventually the director of Francis Ford Coppola's "Virtual Studio". He also co-founded The Tender (2009–2011), a local news website for San Francisco's Tenderloin neighborhood. as well as Maneno (2008–2010), a non-profit, citizen journalism startup focused on creating a platform for news and blogging in Africa, in local languages.

== Awards ==
- Millesima Wine & Innovation Award 2020
- Fortnum & Mason Best Drink Writer 2017
- Geoffrey Roberts Award 2016
