= The FruitGuys =

The FruitGuys is a wellness company headquartered in South San Francisco, California, that delivers fresh fruit to more than 3,000 businesses around the United States. The FruitGuys caters to large corporations and small businesses, serving companies such as Yahoo!, Wells Fargo, and Yamaha. Founded by Chris Mittelstaedt, the company also has an East Coast hub in Philadelphia, Pennsylvania, and a Midwest hub in Chicago, Illinois.

From 2008 to 2011, The FruitGuys was included on the Inc. list of 5,000 fastest-growing businesses in the United States.

== History ==
Entrepreneur Chris Mittelstaedt founded The FruitGuys in 1998 in response to his contacts at dot-com companies complaining of weight gain and sluggishness; consuming soft drinks and snacks while facing long hours in the office. Mittelstaedt believed he could boost wellness efforts in the workplace by delivering farm-fresh produce to employers, and started promoting these services within San Francisco's Embarcadero Center. Along with cold-calling efforts, Mittelstaedt also made appearances in a banana suit on city streets to distribute free fruit and promote healthy eating habits.

The FruitGuys started as a two-person operation and morphed into a multi-million dollar enterprise employing approximately 40 staff. The FruitGuys has spawned numerous competitors and spearheaded a general trend toward health awareness at work.

The company's popularity can be attributed in part to the rise of workplace wellness programs and a collective desire to support local farms and organic food initiatives. Fruit is obtained locally in each region served by The FruitGuys to support local agriculture, cut down on emissions, and ensure freshness.

== Environmental efforts ==
According to The FruitGuys website, an integral part of the company's socially responsible approach is its commitment to using eco-friendly packaging. All boxes used are made of 75 to 100 percent post-consumer recycled cardboard, printed with soy-based inks and reused up to four times. The company also uses a custom-made packaging machine that cuts down on cardboard use by 40 percent.

== Community work ==
According to company founder Chris Mittelstaedt, his top priority is to keep community values and involvement at the core of the company's mission. In April 2008, The FruitGuys launched the Farm Steward Program to support sustainable, small-family farming and to identify and meet individual farm needs. They began by donating four beehives with 48,000 honey bees to a Sebastopol, California farm to call attention to the growing national disappearance of honey bees. Other Farm Steward undertakings have included helping farmers plant new trees and installing four bat boxes for Bay area farms to attract bats, which act as natural insecticides.

In another philanthropic program, the company offers fruit at no cost to young female entrepreneurs in Bayview-Hunters Point, a low-income Bay area neighborhood where fresh produce makes up just 5 percent of the food sold in the local stores. The women then sell the fruit at low cost to neighborhood families as a means of developing entrepreneurial skills and bringing healthy fresh fruit to the community.

In addition to these projects, The FruitGuys donates more than 80,000 pounds of fresh fruit a year (more than 7,000 pounds a month) to non-profit groups and regional food pantries in the United States, such as St. Anthony Foundation and Philabundance.
