= Compton's Cafeteria riot =

1966 protest for transgender rights in San Francisco

- Part of events leading to the gay liberation movement
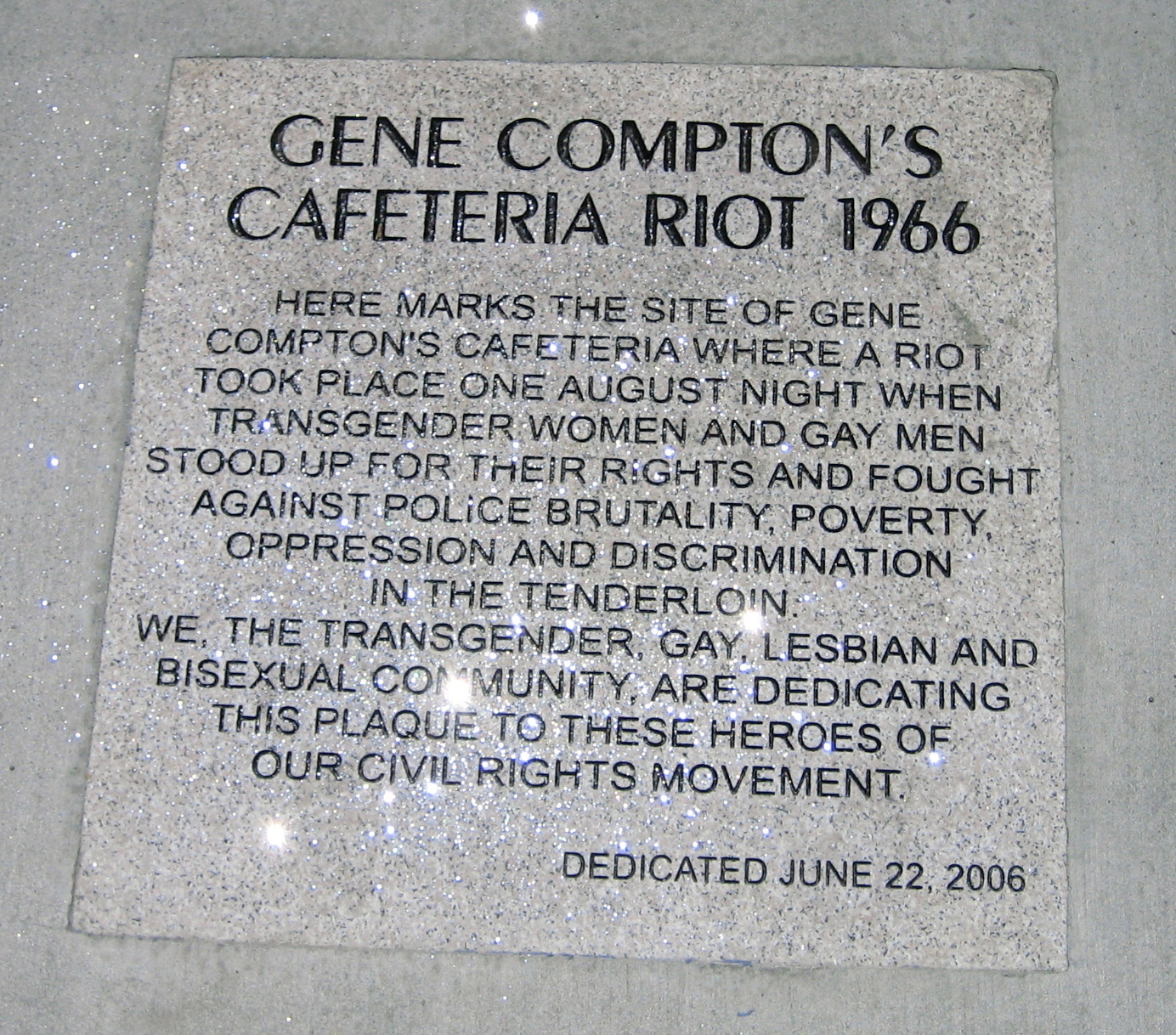
- Gene Compton's Cafeteria Riot 40th anniversary historical marker at corner of Taylor and Turk in San Francisco
- Date: August 1966; 60 years ago
- Location: Tenderloin, San Francisco, U.S. 37°47′00″N 122°24′40″W

Parties
SFPD	Transgender rioters

The Compton's Cafeteria riot occurred in August 1966 in the Tenderloin district of San Francisco. The riot was a response to the violent and constant police harassment of trans people, particularly trans women, and drag queens. The incident was one of the first LGBTQ-related riots in United States history, preceding the more famous 1969 Stonewall riots in New York City by three years. (Note: In 1959 a smaller riot broke out in Los Angeles, when drag queens, lesbians, gay men, and transgender people who frequented Cooper Do-nuts and who were often harassed by the LAPD fought back after police arrested three people, including John Rechy. Patrons began pelting the police with donuts and coffee cups. The LAPD called for back-up and arrested a number of rioters. Rechy and the other two original detainees were able to escape. Faderman, Lillian and Stuart Timmons (2006). Gay L.A.: A History of Sexual Outlaws, Power Politics, and Lipstick Lesbians. Basic Books. pp. 1–2. ISBN 0-465-02288-X) It marked the beginning of transgender activism in San Francisco.

The 1960s was a pivotal period for sexual, gender, and ethnic minorities, as social movements championing civil rights and sexual liberation came to fruition. Additionally, the 1950s created the foundation for the trans rights and gay liberation movements with the earlier Homophile movement. Though Stonewall is often heralded as the beginning of the trans rights movement, the Compton's Cafeteria Riots and the homophile movement came first. Social groups helped mobilize and even churches, like Glide Memorial Methodist Church in San Francisco, began reaching out to the transgender community. Nevertheless, many police officers resisted these movements and the increasing visibility of these groups, continuing to harass and abuse transgender people. This simultaneous rise in support for transgender rights on the one side and the unwillingness to accept these new ideas on the other created the strain that fueled the riot at Compton's Cafeteria in the summer of 1966. The incident began when a transgender woman resisted arrest by throwing coffee at a police officer. It was followed by drag queens and transgender women pouring into the streets, fighting back with their high heels and heavy bags.

== Background ==
=== Increased awareness of transgender identity ===
The general public was first made aware of transgender identities after the famous medical transition and 1952 sex reassignment surgery of Christine Jorgensen in Denmark. Jorgensen was the first famous and well-known trans woman. In the 1960s following Jorgensen's surgery, the ideas and perceptions of gender and trans people started to shift. Gender norms and expressions were bent. Many feminists stopped wearing bras and makeup, hippies and the members of the Beatles grew their hair long, and gender-neutral fashion such as floral patterns became more popular. In 1966, a few months before the riot, Harry Benjamin, who treated Jorgensen, published his book The Transsexual Phenomenon. In the 1950s and 1960s, Benjamin offered information, hormones, and sex reassignment surgery to trans people, and not long before the riot opened a San Francisco practice located at nearby 450 Sutter Street, which has been described as a contributing factor, as many of the trans women who were a part of Compton's Cafeteria received treatment from Benjamin. Benjamin's book The Transsexual Phenomenon further legitimized the concept of being transgender to not only the public, but also the medical community. The book also popularized the concept of medical transition as a way to treat trans patients. In the following years after the book was published, several universities opened gender clinics. From 1964 to 1967, Reed Erickson, a wealthy trans man, helped establish and fund many of these clinics through the Erickson Educational Foundation. In the mid- to late 1960s, the clinic at Johns Hopkins University was making plans to offer medical transition surgeries.

=== Tenderloin district ===
The Oxford English Dictionary's second definition of "tenderloin" definition listed is for the slang term (in full, "tenderloin district") that means "the police district of New York which includes the great mass of theatres, hotels, and places of amusement; thence extended to similar districts of other American cities." Under the second definition, there is a note that a tenderloin district is "understood to have reference to the large amount of 'graft' said to be got by the police for protecting illegitimate houses in this district, which rendered it the 'juicy part' of the service." In simpler terms, "tenderloin district" refers to a district characterized by corrupt police that will not report illegal activities in exchange for money.

The Tenderloin district of San Francisco was always inhabited by traditionally marginalized peoples — working-class people, people of color, etc. In the early 1960s, there was a push for "urban renewal" of the waterfront North Beach neighborhood and South of Market neighborhood, which were visibly gay, working-class areas. Through intense policing and targeted redevelopment of the neighborhoods, residents were pushed out and forced to relocate. Many relocated to the Tenderloin district, which is directly adjacent to South of Market and a few blocks away from North Beach. This relocation made the Tenderloin an area largely made up of queer and trans people. There were a few gay bars in the district already, but many more were established as the LGBTQ population continued to grow.

=== Sex work in the Tenderloin ===
Many trans women and drag queens did sex work, which many of them referred to as "hustling", in order to survive. A number of the women that Susan Stryker interviewed for the 2005 documentary film Screaming Queens: The Riot at Compton's Cafeteria, who were all members of the transgender community in the Tenderloin district during the time of the riot at Compton's Cafeteria, were involved in street prostitution. Among these women was Tamara Ching, who later became a sex-workers-rights activist. They ended up in the profession, many of them lamented, because they faced job discrimination and systematic marginalization. Eventually, they stopped trying to seek employment elsewhere, though some "fortunate" ones were saved from the dangers of street prostitution because they could "pass" (i.e., be perceived as cisgender by society) and get other jobs, such as singers and dancers. Sex workers faced police harassment and abuse by their clients. Some of the women were able to pick up clients in bars and clubs, but many establishments didn't want them to work there because it was illegal and police could raid the building at any time. Many of the women were forced to work on the streets, which many of them felt was more dangerous. Many were murdered or assaulted, and there was even a serial killer that specifically targeted, mutilated, and killed trans women sex workers (especially those working on the streets) in the Tenderloin. Felicia "Flames" Elizondo, a participant in the riot, recalled in 2015 that "a lot of people thought we were sick, mental trash. Nobody cared whether we lived or died. Our own families abandoned us, and we had nowhere to go."

=== Compton's Cafeteria ===
Compton's Cafeteria was a chain of cafeterias owned by Gene Compton in San Francisco from the 1940s to the 1970s. The Tenderloin location of Compton's at 101 Taylor Street (at Turk)—open from 1954 to 1972—was a popular meeting place for transgender people, especially trans women, to congregate publicly in the city. The cafeteria was more of a place to socialize than a restaurant. Compton's was one of the few places that they could meet, as many trans women were unwelcome in gay bars due to transphobia. The reason they were so unwelcome in gay bars is because since cross dressing was subject to arrest, this put gay bars at risk. Before the riot, the cafeteria was open all night, so trans people and drag queens could meet up after a long night of "hustling" (i.e. doing sex work).

Compton's management and staff, in an effort to deter drag queens and trans women, frequently called the police when they were present, causing them to be harassed and arrested for a crime called "female impersonation". Police would also come into Compton's without being called because they knew that there were likely people present whom they could harass and arrest. Police could arrest the drag queens and trans women for wearing articles of women's clothing or makeup. One of the trans women in Screaming Queens noted that a trans woman could get arrested for having the buttons on the "wrong" side (i.e. the left side of the shirt, where buttons tend to be placed on women's clothing). Because cross-dressing was illegal at the time, police could use the presence of transgender people in a bar as a pretext for making a raid and closing the establishment. Before the riot, there were often physical fights between customers that occurred from 2:00-3:00 am, which was another reason police could raid and close the restaurant. The cafeteria was open all hours until the riot occurred. After the riot, Compton's Cafeteria began to close at midnight in an effort to prevent more conflict. In 1972, the cafeteria closed for good. No records of the building's exterior appearance at the time were known to have survived, until in 2021 photos surfaced on social media that had been taken in 1970 of an unrelated event and showed Compton's Cafeteria in the background.

=== Youth activism ===
In 1965, two groups of queer youth, Vanguard and the Street Orphans, were involved in the riot and events leading up to it. Vanguard was formed in 1965 and was the first known gay youth organization in the United States. It was initially founded under the Glide Memorial Church, a radical offshoot of the Methodist Church and a center for progressive social activism in the Tenderloin. The Street Orphans were a gang of lesbian youth founded in the Tenderloin.

Vanguard began publishing a eponymous magazine, titled Vanguard, about a month before the Compton's riot. The publication was attributed to shaping the political consciousness in the queer community as "the issues facing gay and transgender youth in the 1960s produced radical insights into the connections between economic class, police violence, incarceration, and homophobia". Many hustlers and street queens involved in the riot were members of Vanguard. The cafeteria kicked Vanguard members out, often citing that they would not buy anything. In Screaming Queens, Susan Stryker explained that these incidents "lit the fuse that led directly to the riot." In response to both the aforementioned and police harassment of trans people, Vanguard picketed at Compton's Cafeteria on July 19, 1966. There was an article titled "Young Homos Picket Compton's" published about the demonstration in a local newspaper. Although the picket was unsuccessful, it was one of the first demonstrations against police violence directed towards transgender people in San Francisco and ultimately led to the Compton's Cafeteria riot.

== Riot ==
In the 1960s the Compton's Cafeteria staff would frequently call the police on transgender customers. Management felt that they were loitering and causing them to lose business. In response, they implemented a service fee directed at transgender individuals and harassed them in an attempt to get them to leave the restaurant. It was common for the police to come into Compton's, arrest people for the crime of "female impersonation." For over fifty years drag queens were abused by the San Francisco police department, often arrested them for sex work and for violating the city's cross dressing law (which was repealed in 1974).

The Compton's Cafeteria riot began on an August night of 1966, the month directly following the July Vanguard picket. The exact date is unknown because there was no media coverage at the time and San Francisco's 1960s police records no longer exist. One of the riot's participants claimed that the riot occurred on a "hot" weekend night. A Compton's worker called the police claiming that some transgender customers became raucous. The police responded to the call and came to Compton's. When one of the cops grabbed and attempted to arrest a trans woman, she threw a cup of coffee in his face. According to the director of Screaming Queens, Susan Stryker, the cafeteria "erupted". Patrons also said that they threw many items, such as sugar shakers, tables, and dinnerware at the police and at the windows, causing them to shatter. They also hit the cops with their purses and high heels. In order to request backup, the police retreated into the streets, where the fighting continued. The protesters damaged a police car and burned down a sidewalk newsstand. The police responded by fighting back, and they tried to arrest the protesters and load them into paddy wagons. Elliott Blackstone, who was a part of the San Francisco police at the time of the riot, said that "there was unnecessary violence" from cops on the night of the Compton's Cafeteria riot.

The next day, more transgender people, hustlers, Tenderloin street people, and other members of the LGBT community returned to the cafeteria to picket because Compton's Cafeteria would not let them enter the establishment due to putting these other groups at risk too. The demonstration ended with the newly installed plate-glass windows being smashed again. Compton's Cafeteria business declined over the years after the riot, and finally closed in 1972.

== Effects of the riot ==
=== Vanguard street actions ===
Following the Compton's riot, Vanguard orchestrated several notable actions. In early autumn of 1966, Vanguard hosted a historic "street sweep" in response to the events at Compton's. About fifty Vanguard members took to the streets of the Tenderloin with push brooms borrowed from the city. They did so in protest, a direct response to the routine practice of police "sweeping" the streets of known queer neighborhoods—such as the Tenderloin—to remove all the queer people. Many held handmade signs reading "Fall Clean Up: This Is a Vanguard Community Project", and "All trash is before the broom", pushing against the idea that they, as people, were in any way disposable or unworthy of human dignity. Vanguard symbolically called into question the fact that police were treating transgender and queer sex workers like "trash" to be "swept away", and instead reclaimed public space as their own.

=== Community organizations ===
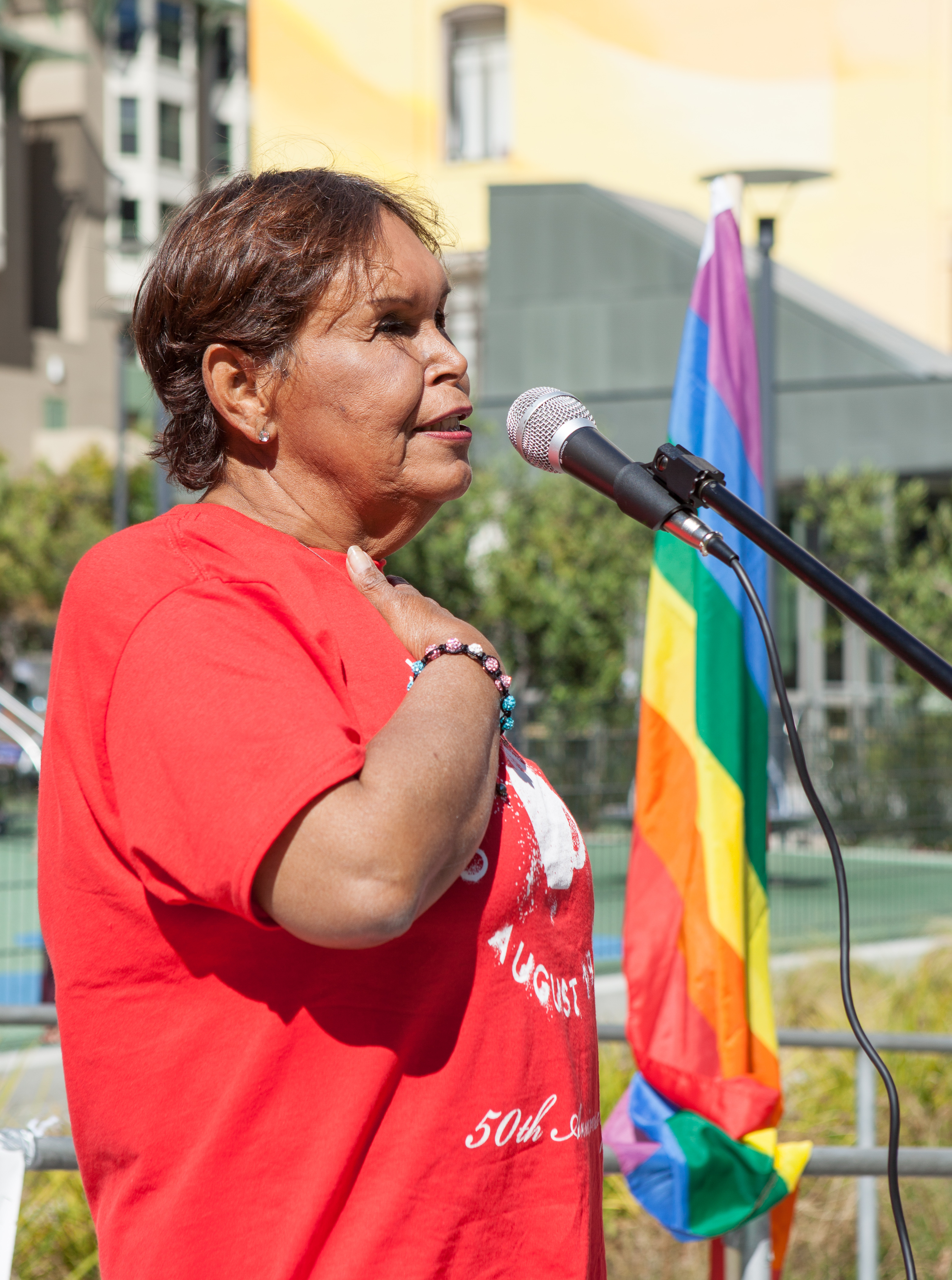
Felicia "Flames" Elizondo speaks at a celebration of the 50th anniversary of the Compton's Cafeteria riot, August 2016.

The riot marked a turning point in the local LGBT movement. Transgender activists used the riot's momentum to establish several community-based support services, with the most successful being the National Transsexual Counseling Unit (NTCU), established in 1968. The NTCU is said to be the first peer-run counseling support resource in the world. The NTCU's success was partially due to financial support from the Erickson Education Foundation, which funded renting an office space and hiring two full time peer counselors. Serving as an overseer to the NTCU was Sergeant Elliott Blackstone, designated in 1962 as the first San Francisco Police Department liaison to what was then called the "homophile community". The NTCU served the community until 1974, when reactionary members of the SFPD arrested one of the peer counselors on false drug charges, and attempted to frame Blackstone with drugs planted in his desk. While Blackstone didn't face charges, he was reassigned to a different department, leaving the NTCU staggering along for a short while before the EEF withdrew funding.

Nevertheless, the Compton's Cafeteria riot has been described as having been "largely lost to history" until historian Susan Stryker rediscovered it and, in 2005, with Victor Silverman, released the documentary Screaming Queens. Susan Stryker recorded the riot and the events afterwards to create a memorial to the riots. It is because of her work that monuments were created for the 50th anniversary of the riots.

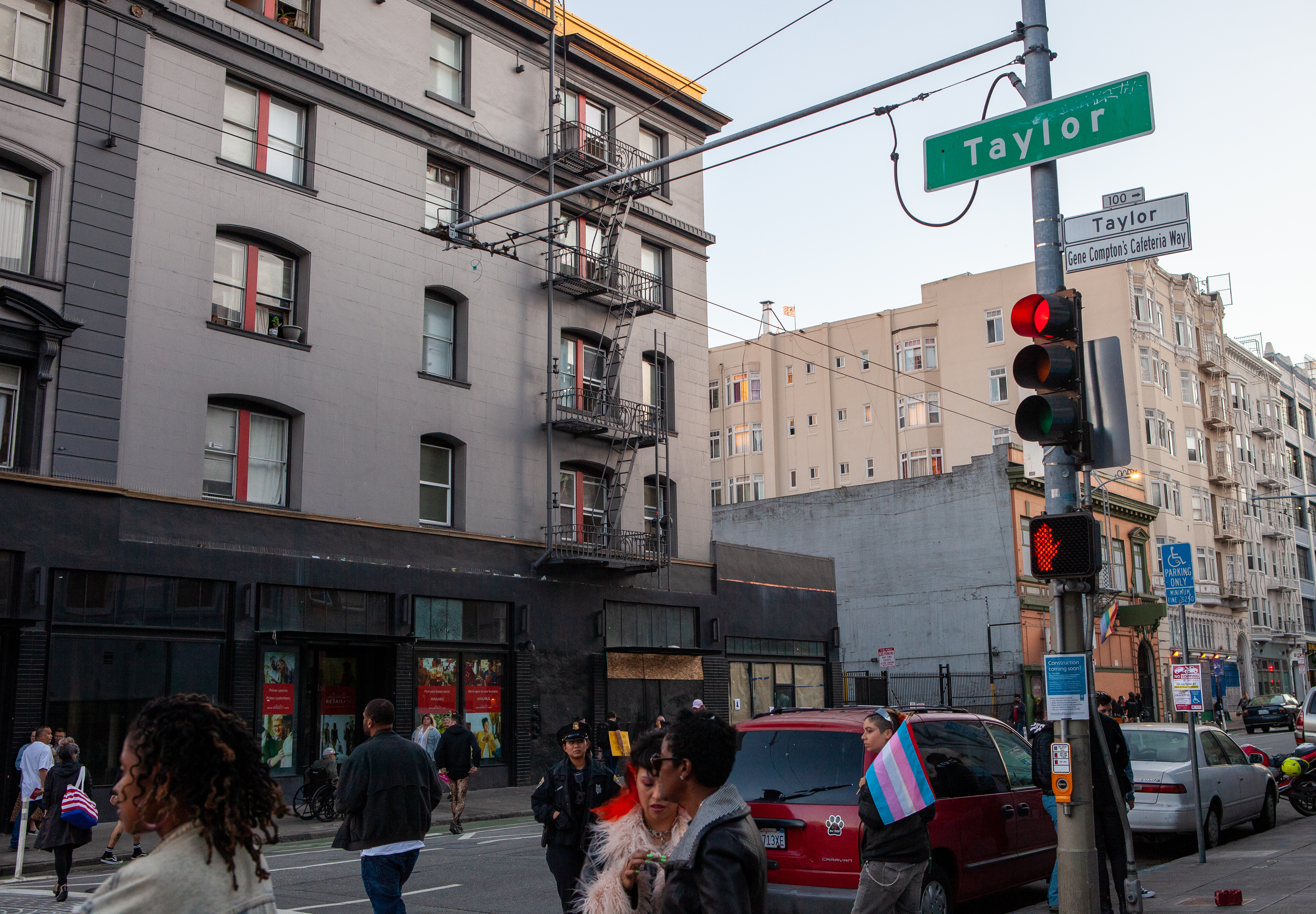
The intersection of Taylor and Turk streets, following the 2019 San Francisco Trans March. A sign under the Taylor Street sign reads "Gene Compton's Cafeteria Way".

According to Susan Stryker, Compton's Cafeteria riot was "the first known incident of collective militant queer resistance to police harassment in U.S. history." Transgender people finally stood up to the abuse and discrimination by police officers. The riot "did not solve the problems that transgender people in the Tenderloin faced daily", but prompted the city to begin addressing them as citizens rather than as a problem to be removed. Police brutality towards them decreased over time, and they had less fear of being heckled by the police department for dressing how they chose during the daytime.

On June 24, 2016, at the conclusion of the San Francisco Trans March, a new street sign was unveiled, renaming the 100 block of Taylor Street to Gene Compton's Cafeteria Way. In August 2016, a number of events were held to celebrate the 50th anniversary of the riot, including a gathering in Boeddeker Park in the Tenderloin. Felicia "Flames" Elizondo, who participated in the riot and would later undergo gender reassignment surgery, was a speaker at the 50th anniversary celebrations.

In 2017, the City of San Francisco recognized the Compton's Transgender Cultural District, the world's first legally recognized transgender district. In March 2020, its name changed to The Transgender District.

Formed out of a working group discussing "Transecological Imaginations" with Susan Stryker, the TurkxTaylor initiative emerged in 2023. Concerned with GEO Group's ownership of the building and its operation as a private prison, the initiative began hosting a variety of community events in an effort to build a coalition and campaign to "liberate" the building.

On January 27, 2025, the building located at the site of the Compton's Cafeteria Riot was added to the National Register of Historic Places.

== In fiction and art ==
In the first episode of the 2019 Netflix miniseries Tales of the City, Anna Madrigal (Olympia Dukakis) receives a photograph of herself in front of Compton's, taken shortly after she had arrived in San Francisco. In episode three, her tenant and friend Shawna Hawkins (Elliot Page) learns about the riot from new friend Claire Duncan (Zosia Mamet). The two visit the site and lie down together next to the historical marker. The riot is depicted in episode eight of the series, including historical touches like the throwing of the coffee into a cop's face. A 2022 young adult novel was published which mentions the events, called The Edge of Being. The book has the main character Fig finding out his father was apart of the riots.

The Red Shades is a "Trans Superhero Rock Opera" that occurs on Z Space's Steindler Stage in San Francisco's Project Artaud complex. In The Red Shades, a teenage trans femme Ida runs away from an abusive home in Nevada to live in the Flip House, a hippie flat in San Francisco where she receives affirmations and conflict, similar to the real world 1960s Tenderloin life. The Red Shades is written by Adrienne Price and directed by Rotimi Agbabiaka and Edris Cooper-Anifowoshe. The performance utilizes real San Francisco locations, photo projections of the past, and names.

"Screaming Queens: The Riot at Compton's Cafeteria " is a documentary film directed by Susan Stryker and Victor Silverman, that explores the history of transgender activism and resistance in San Francisco's Tenderloin district.The film focuses on the riot that took place at Compton's Cafeteria in 1966, three years before the more widely known Stonewall uprising.The documentary sheds light on the experiences of transgender women, drag queens, and other gender non-conforming individuals who frequented Compton's Cafeteria, which served as a gathering place for the transgender community. It delves into the systemic discrimination and harassment they faced from law enforcement and society at large.

The film recounts the events leading up to the riot, including police harassment and the oppressive environment that transgender individuals endured. It highlights the pivotal role played by transgender women in igniting the protest against police brutality and social injustice. "Screaming Queens" showcases the resilience and determination of the transgender community as they fought back against oppression. The documentary explores the impact of the riot on the emerging transgender rights movement and its significance in paving the way for future activism and advocacy. Through interviews with activists, archival footage, and personal narratives, the film highlights the historical importance of the Compton's Cafeteria riot and the contributions of transgender individuals in the struggle for LGBTQ+ rights. It serves as a reminder of the ongoing fight for equality and the need to recognize and uplift the voices and experiences of transgender and gender non-conforming individuals.

The immersive play she co-wrote, The Compton’s Cafeteria Riot (produced by the Tenderloin Museum), recreates SF transgender history and received many accolades, including SF Weekly’s Best of 2018. Donna was recently selected by the SF Pride Board of Directors as the 2019 Lifetime Achievement Grand Marshal.

The Compton’s Cafeteria Riot!, a play about the riot, was co-written by Donna Personna, Collette LeGrande, and Mark Nassar. It was directed by Ezra Reaves and produced by the Tenderloin Museum. The play was originally held in 2018 and again in 2025.

== Gallery ==
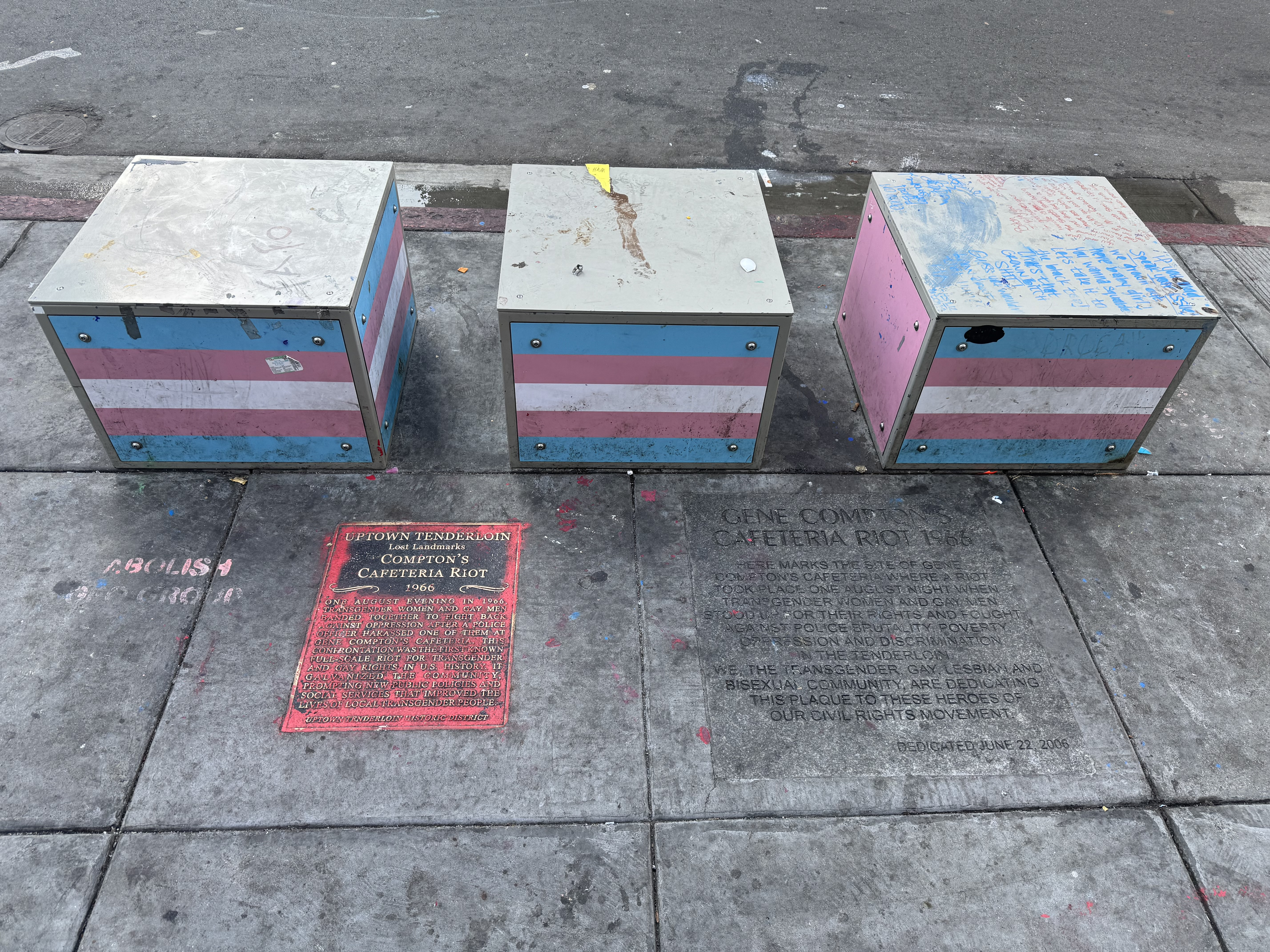
Both plaques commemorate the Compton Cafeteria Riot in the context of their immediate surroundings. Located on the sidewalk in the northwest corner of the intersection of Turk St and Taylor St in San Francisco.

== See also ==
- Hazel's Inn raid
- List of incidents of civil unrest in the United States
- List of LGBT actions in the United States prior to the Stonewall riots
