= San Francisco Trans March =

LGBT event

The 2009 logo of the San Francisco Trans March.

The San Francisco Trans March is an annual gathering and protest march in San Francisco, California, that takes place on the Friday night of Pride weekend, the last weekend of June. It is a trans and gender non-conforming and inclusive event in the same spirit of the original gay pride parades and dyke marches. It is one of the few large annual transgender events in the world and has likely been the largest transgender event since its inception in June 2004. The purpose of the event is to increase visibility, activism and acceptance of all gender-variant people.

The event became the fourth main LGBT Pride event in San Francisco; all of which are inclusive and ask for donations instead of requiring paid admission; San Francisco Pride (SF Pride), with a festival on Saturday, parade and festival Sunday; San Francisco Dyke March on Saturday afternoon and march in the evening; and Pink Saturday, which is an evening street party in the Castro District Saturday evening run by the Sisters of Perpetual Indulgence. SF Pride, and the organizers of the other much larger events, all participated in supporting the event since its inception with funds, material and technical support. In recent years, the event has begun at Mission Dolores Park (the same staging and performance area as the Dyke March), and has ended in the Tenderloin, near the location of the Compton's Cafeteria Riot.

== History ==
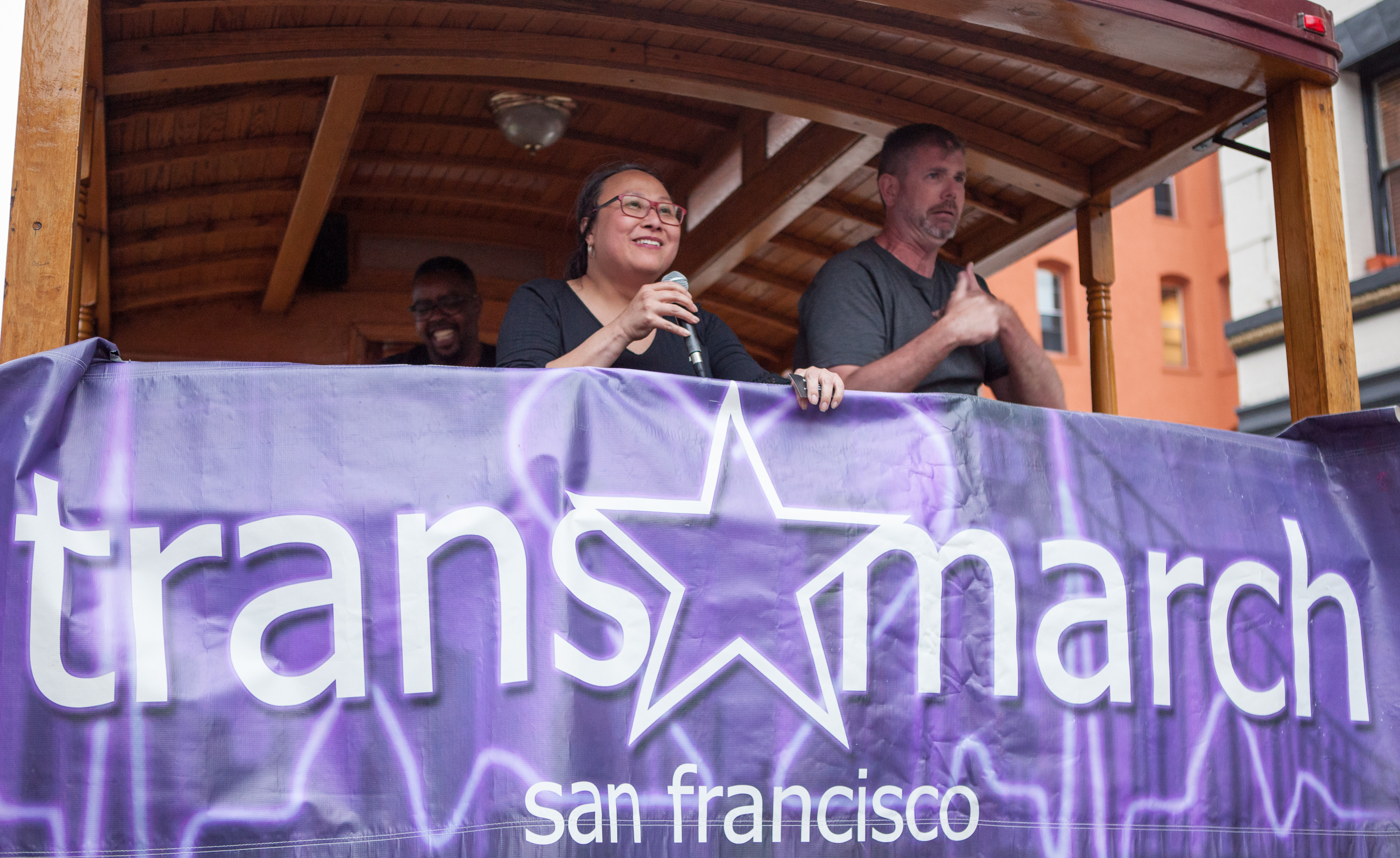
Cecilia Chung speaks at the 2017 San Francisco Trans March.

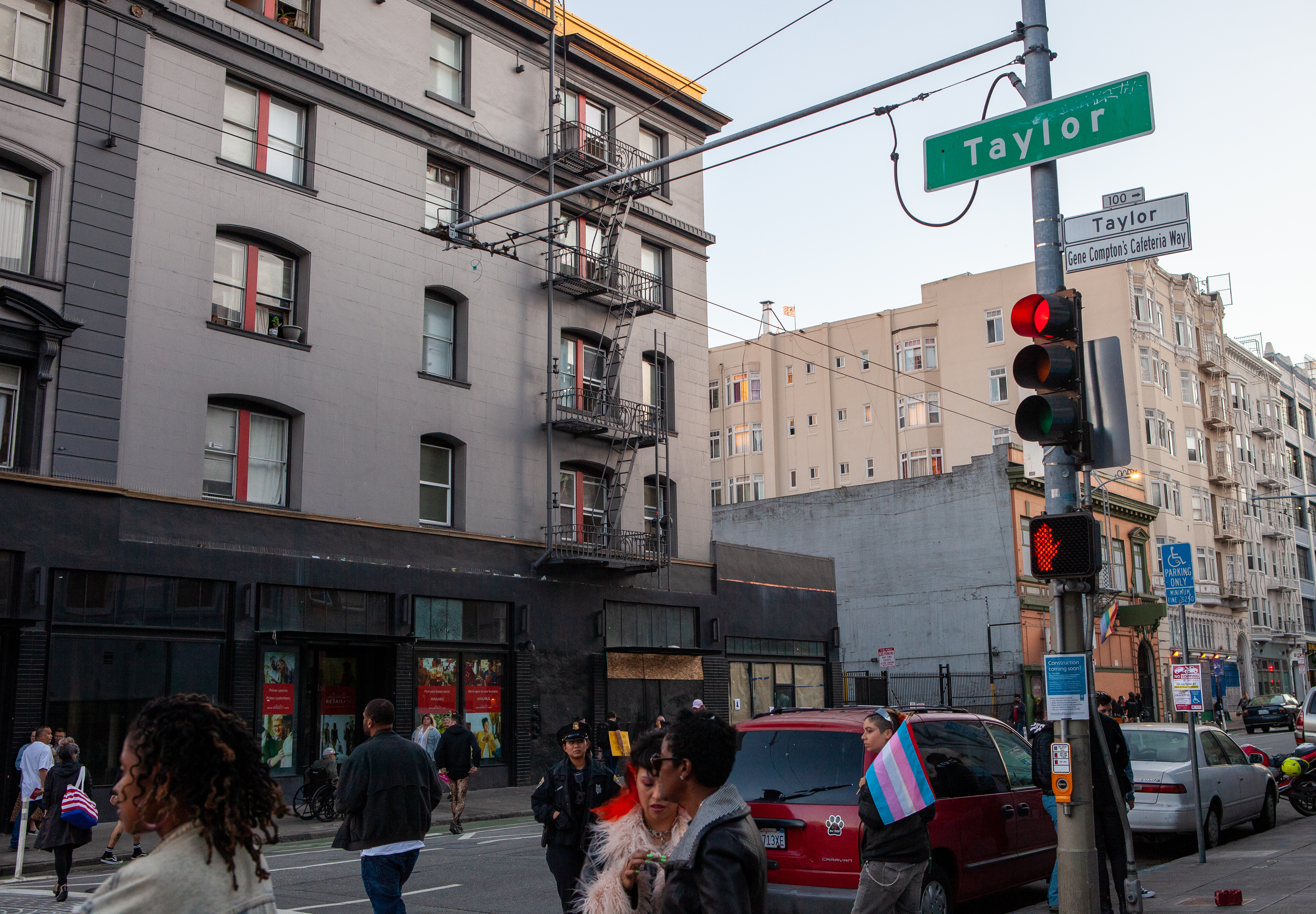
The intersection of Taylor and Turk Streets, following the 2019 San Francisco Trans March. A sign under the Taylor street sign reads "Gene Compton's Cafeteria Way".

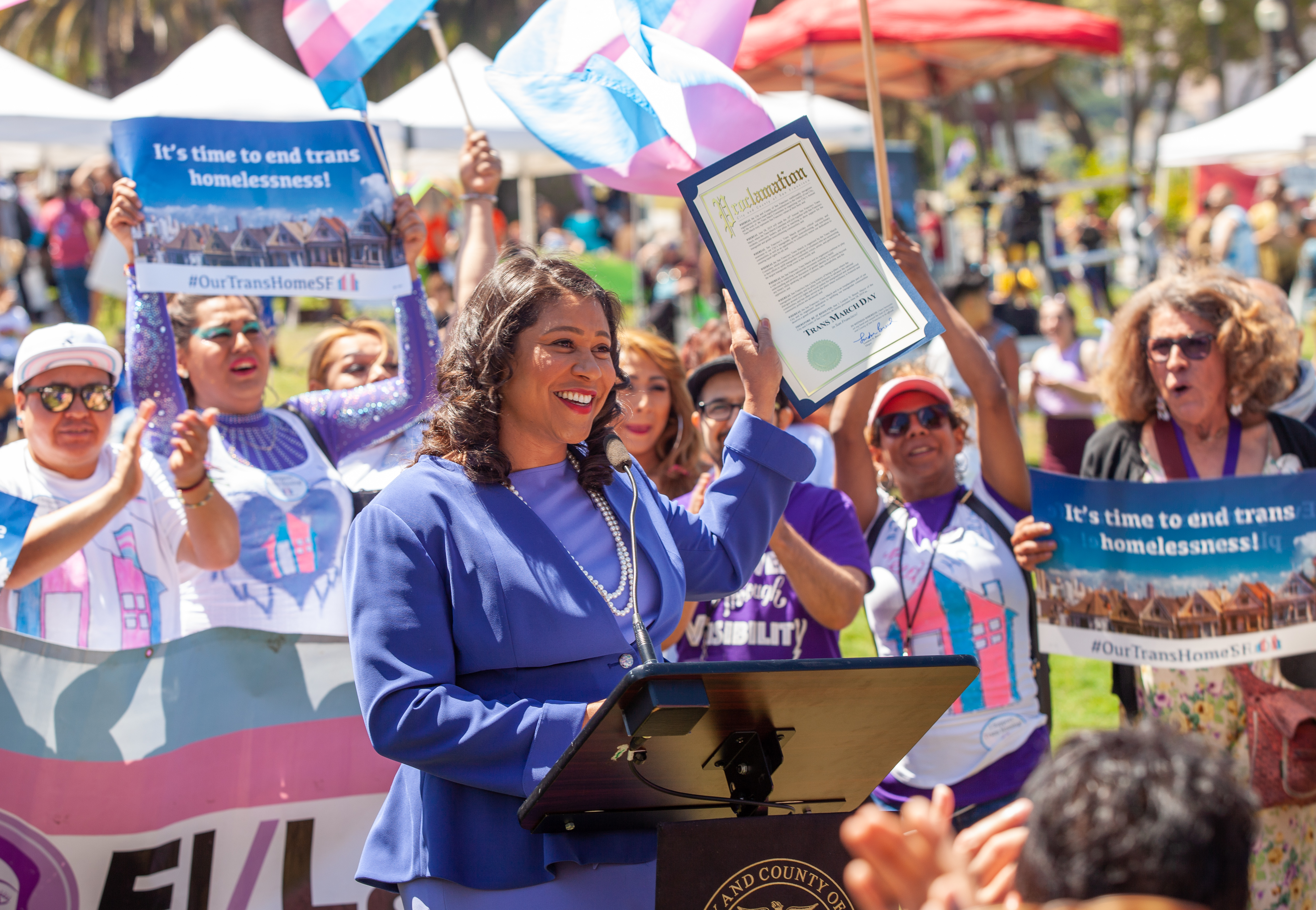
San Francisco Mayor London Breed proclaims June 28, 2019, to be "Trans March Day".

An anonymous e-mail was widely distributed to San Francisco Bay Area's activist and transgender communities in March 2004. It coincided with the first trial in the murder of East Bay trans woman Gwen Araujo and called for a Trans March helping launch "the largest transgender event of its kind." Araujo's murder by four men and their disposing of her body heightened awareness of violence against LGBT people and especially trans women and trans men. Araujo's related case and appeals lasted for over two years. The first several Trans Marches ended with a rally including a trans altar remembering her and many other trans people also killed. Attendance in 2004 was estimated at 2,000; it doubled to 4,000 the following year.

In 2008 Donna Rose, who had resigned from national LGBT advocacy group Human Rights Campaign after the organization supported a version of the Employment Non-Discrimination Act that did not include gender identity, was one of many featured speakers. The theme of 2008 was "Marching for a Gender Inclusive ENDA and removal of Gender Identity 'Disorder' (GID) as a mental illness." Activist Arianna Davis stated to the crowd, "We are mocked by medicine and belittled by the media ... I don't have a mental disorder – do you?" She implored the crowd to "demand that GID be removed from the Diagnostic and Statistical Manual of Mental Disorders (DSM)." Protesters also objected to the current workgroup appointed by the American Psychiatric Association to revise the gender and sexuality sections of the DSM as it included Kenneth Zucker, "known for his gender-conforming therapies in children", and Ray Blanchard, whose theory of autogynephilia "claims that some people transition because they are aroused by female clothing." Attendance of the march, which grew in diversity, was estimated at 10,000.

In 2009 the now ten-person coordinating committee elected to forgo the Castro gay neighborhood and instead march through the predominantly Latino Mission District. They cited several reasons: for one, many transgender people lived in the neighborhood, unable to afford the pricier Castro; organizer Fresh White noted the need to heighten transgender visibility because of the "tremendous amount of violence that happens" to transgender people in the neighborhood; finally, the area also had a lot of residents who voted for Proposition 8, the Californian legislation the changed the state constitution to limit marriage rights to only gender binary male-female couples. Organizers expected 10,000 attendees and the event to cost $10,000 much of it raised through sponsorships and fundraisers. Cecilia Chung, a trans woman and the chair of the San Francisco Human Rights Commission, was the keynote speaker.

In 2015, Ryan Cassata was the headlining musician and TAJA's Coalition was the headlining speaker. Laverne Cox also spoke briefly. An estimated 10,000 - 20,000 people marched from Mission Dolores Park to UN Plaza. The Civic Center was lit up in the colors of the transgender pride flag.

In 2016, attendees expressed anger at local politicians who attempted to speak at the event. At the conclusion of the march, a new street sign was unveiled, renaming the 100 block of Taylor Street to Gene Compton's Cafeteria Way in honor of the Compton's Cafeteria Riot.

In 2017, the march concluded with an announcement that the area at Turk and Taylor in the Tenderloin had been designated a Transgender Cultural District by the City of San Francisco.

In 2019, San Francisco Mayor London Breed held a press conference with the Office of Transgender Initiatives prior to the march. Breed declared June 28, 2019 - the day of that year's Trans March and the 50th anniversary of the Stonewall riots - to be "Trans March Day", and announced a housing program for trans residents.

== See also ==
- Trans March
