= Alfred Boeddeker =

American Franciscan friar

Father Alfred Boeddeker
- Founder of St. Anthony Dining Room, St. Anthony Free Medical Clinic
- Church: Roman Catholic Church
- Diocese: San Francisco

Orders
- Ordination: 1927

Personal details
- Born: Anthony Boeddeker; August 7, 1903 San Francisco, California, U.S.
- Died: January 1, 1994 (aged 90) San Francisco, California, U.S.
- Denomination: Roman Catholic
- Occupation: Franciscan Priest, Humanitarian
- Motto: "The great activity of our life is to love." *"I see God as one act—just loving, like the sun always shining."

Alfred Boeddeker, O.F.M. (August 7, 1903 as Anthony Boeddeker — January 1, 1994) was an American Franciscan friar who is best known for having founded humanitarian programs to aid the poor and marginalised in the San Francisco Bay Area. These programs, named by Father Boeddeker for Saint Anthony of Padua, include the St. Anthony Dining Room (1950), the St. Anthony Free Medical Clinic (1956), and the St. Anthony Farm, 315 acres (1.27 km^{2}) near Petaluma in Sonoma County, California. The dining room and medical clinic are part of the St. Anthony Foundation.

== Biography ==
Anthony Boeddeker was born in San Francisco, California. At the age of 10, he entered the Franciscan seminary in Santa Barbara; he took his vows in 1921 as brother Alfred and was ordained a priest in 1927. He studied theology at the Santa Barbara Seminary and pastored at the St. Rafael Church in Goleta, California. From 1930 to 1933 he studied in Rome, Italy. After his return from Rome, he taught for fifteen years at the Franciscan School of Theology at the Mission Santa Barbara.

Boeddeker was selected to start a Catholic university in Hankou, China. In preparation for this assignment, he enrolled in a graduate program at the University of California, Berkeley to study Mandarin, Japanese and Russian languages and Chinese history and politics. The Hankou plans were cancelled, however, after the Chinese Civil War ended in a victory for the Chinese Communist Party on the mainland in 1949. Father Boeddeker was then appointed pastor of St. Boniface Church in the Tenderloin, San Francisco, California, where he remained for the rest of his life. Not far from this church, two of Boeddeker's sayings are prominently displayed on the walls of the St. Anthony Dining Room on Jones Street.

As well as serving as pastor, Boeddeker was also president of the Franciscan National Marian Commission (1955–1979), associate editor of The Marian Era (1960–1979), and a member of the Mariological Society of America, the Pontificia Academia Mariana Internationalis and the Ecumenical Society of the Blessed Virgin Mary.

== Legacy ==
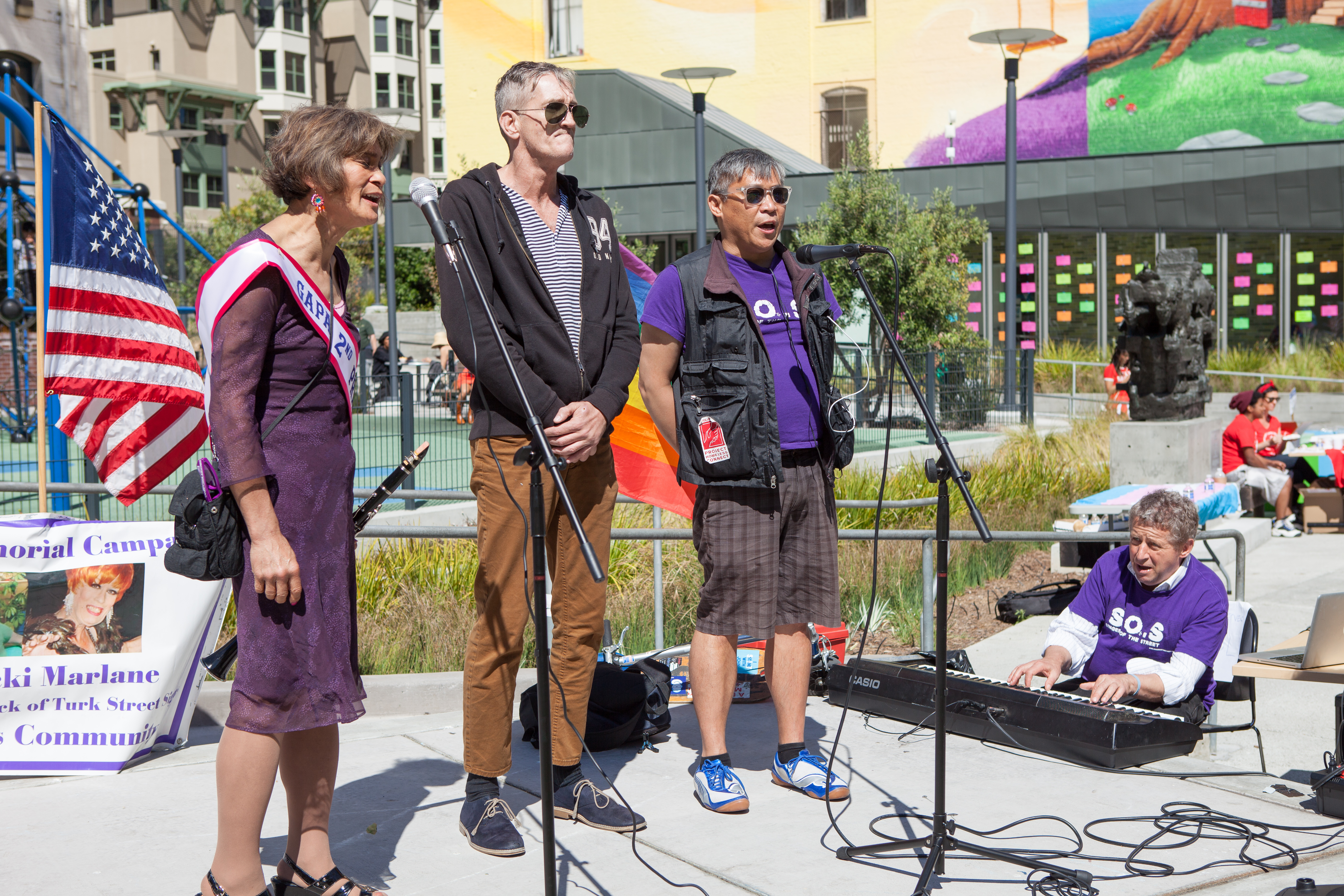
Singers of the Street perform in Boeddeker Park, August 2016.

A recreation center named after Boeddeker is located in the Tenderloin neighborhood of San Francisco. The recreation center features the sculpture Redding School, Self-Portrait, (4 ft. x 16 1/2 ft. x 2 1/4 in.) which was created as a tribute to Boeddeker by artist Ruth Asawa with assistance from children at Redding Elementary School. The piece, a bas relief wall mural, consists of a portrait of Boeddeker surrounded by children and scenes from San Francisco, including animals, street cars, cars, houses, airplanes and birds. The mural is made of glass fiber reinforced concrete and is framed with a plain concrete border. Children from the school created images with pastry dough which were then added into the mural. The piece was surveyed in 1993 by the Smithsonian Institution's Save Outdoor Sculpture! program and was described as needing conservation treatment.

Boeddeker Park in the Tenderloin district is named after him.

== Notes ==
- "St. Anthony Dining Room: The Loaf Keeps on Multiplying" in American Catholic, October 2005.
- "Saint Anthony’s celebrates founder’s centenary" in Catholic San Francisco, August 15, 2003.
- History of the Franciscan School of Theology.
- History of St. Boniface Church in the Tenderloin.
- St. Anthony's Clinic as described by the University of California, San Francisco Medical school.
- St. Anthony Farm website (no longer operated by the Foundation)
