= California opioid crisis =

Misuse of opioid medications in California, United States

The opioid epidemic in the United States has affected California particularly strongly. Between 2017 and 2023, the number of fatalities in California attributable to synthetic opioids increased by 1,027% (almost eleven-fold). In 2023, fentanyl, a particularly potent opioid that often contaminates other recreational drugs, caused 20% of deaths among California's teenagers and young adults. California has made legal efforts to tackle the opioid issue, including patrols, assistance grants, and education.

== Background ==
Opioids are a diverse class of strong, addictive, and inexpensive drugs, which include opiates (i.e., morphine and codeine), oxycodone (OxyContin, Percocet), hydrocodone (Vicodin, Norco), and fentanyl. Traditionally, opioids have been prescribed for short-term pain management, as short-term use is supported by a body of evidence. The usefulness of opioids in chronic pain is dependent on the kind of pain being treated (e.g., visceral and central pain may be "especially unresponsive to long-term opioid therapy") and the patient. Clinical guidelines advise that opioids should only be used for chronic pain if safer alternatives are not feasible, as their risks often outweigh their benefits.

The potency and availability of opioids have made them popular as both medical treatments and recreational drugs. The Substance Abuse and Mental Health Services Administration (SAMHSA) estimated that over 10 million Americans abused prescription opioids in 2018; 47,600 Americans died from opioid overdoses in 2018. These substances have high risks of addiction and overdose, and long-term use can cause tolerance and physical dependence. When people continue to use opioid medications beyond what a doctor prescribes, whether to minimize pain or induce euphoric feelings, it can mark the beginning stages of an opioid addiction. More than 650,000 Americans have died of drug overdoses since the opioid epidemic began.

In 2014, the passing of California Proposition 47 reduced possession of small amounts of drugs from a felony to a misdemeanor.

== San Francisco fentanyl crisis ==
Fentanyl. 2 mg (white powder to the right) is a lethal dose in most people. US penny is 19 mm (0.75 in) wide.

Synthetic opioids, most notably fentanyl and drugs laced with it have seen increasing usage in San Francisco since 2019. In 2023, 810 people died from accidental drug overdoses, a majority containing fentanyl, in San Francisco, with overdoses per 100,000 people being more than double the national average. From January to July 2024, 412 people died from unintentional drug overdoses.

Fentanyl is on average approximately $100 per ounce cheaper in San Francisco than in New York City or Philadelphia, or even other California cities like Los Angeles and Sacramento. This cheaper pricing has been blamed for the higher overdose rate in San Francisco. In January 2023, lower-grade fentanyl was being sold on San Francisco streets for $150 to $200 per ounce, while higher-grade fentanyl went for between $500 and $550 per ounce. Some fentanyl users reported that they obtained the drug for free by doing favors for fentanyl dealers.

Members of the DEA have said they believe fentanyl's price is cheaper in the city due to "soft drug policies". Local users have reported they believe the price is cheaper because San Francisco fentanyl has been diluted with other substances, pointing to the more expensive price of fentanyl in previous years. The DEA has reported that "regular" fentanyl sold in the city ranges on average between 5% and 10% purity. Another theory, held by some of those involved with drug policy, is that the saturation of the market in the city has driven down prices.

Authorities have reported that fentanyl from San Francisco is the source of fentanyl in Sacramento and that users and dealers from across California have traveled to San Francisco to purchase the drug more cheaply, although this latter assertion has been challenged by local nonprofits.

In mid-2022, arrests of drug dealers and users increased in San Francisco, with the appointment of Brooke Jenkins as district attorney.

In December 2023, the city of San Francisco began testing wastewater for fentanyl and other drugs such as the amphetamines (including methamphetamine) and cocaine, and even xylazine and naloxone. The testing was part of a larger study by the National Institute on Drug Abuse which was testing wastewater in 70 other U.S. cities, and was scheduled to continue until August 2024.

Between May 2023 and January 2024, law enforcement in the city seized 145 pounds of fentanyl. In early 2024, the California Highway Patrol (CHP) recovered 42 pounds of fentanyl within a ten-mile radius of the Tenderloin neighborhood in San Francisco. In the same period, the CHP issued more than 6,000 drug-related citations, leading to nearly 500 arrests.

The table below shows the number of deaths per year due to drug overdoses in San Francisco:

Year	Deaths	Ref
2017	222	
2018	259	
2019	441	
2020	726	
2021	642	
2022	649	
2023	810	
2024	635	
2025	625	
2026	148	
Total (since 2017)	5157	

== Statistics ==
Over 80,000 Americans may have fatally overdosed on opioids in 2021, with more than 11,200 of those fatalities occurring in California. Fentanyl is responsible for the death of 20% of teens and young adults in California, aged 15–24. In 2023, drug overdoses were two to three times more fatal than state car accidents. In 2023, the number of California state fatalities linked to synthetic opioids climbed by 1,027% since 2017.

== Government response ==
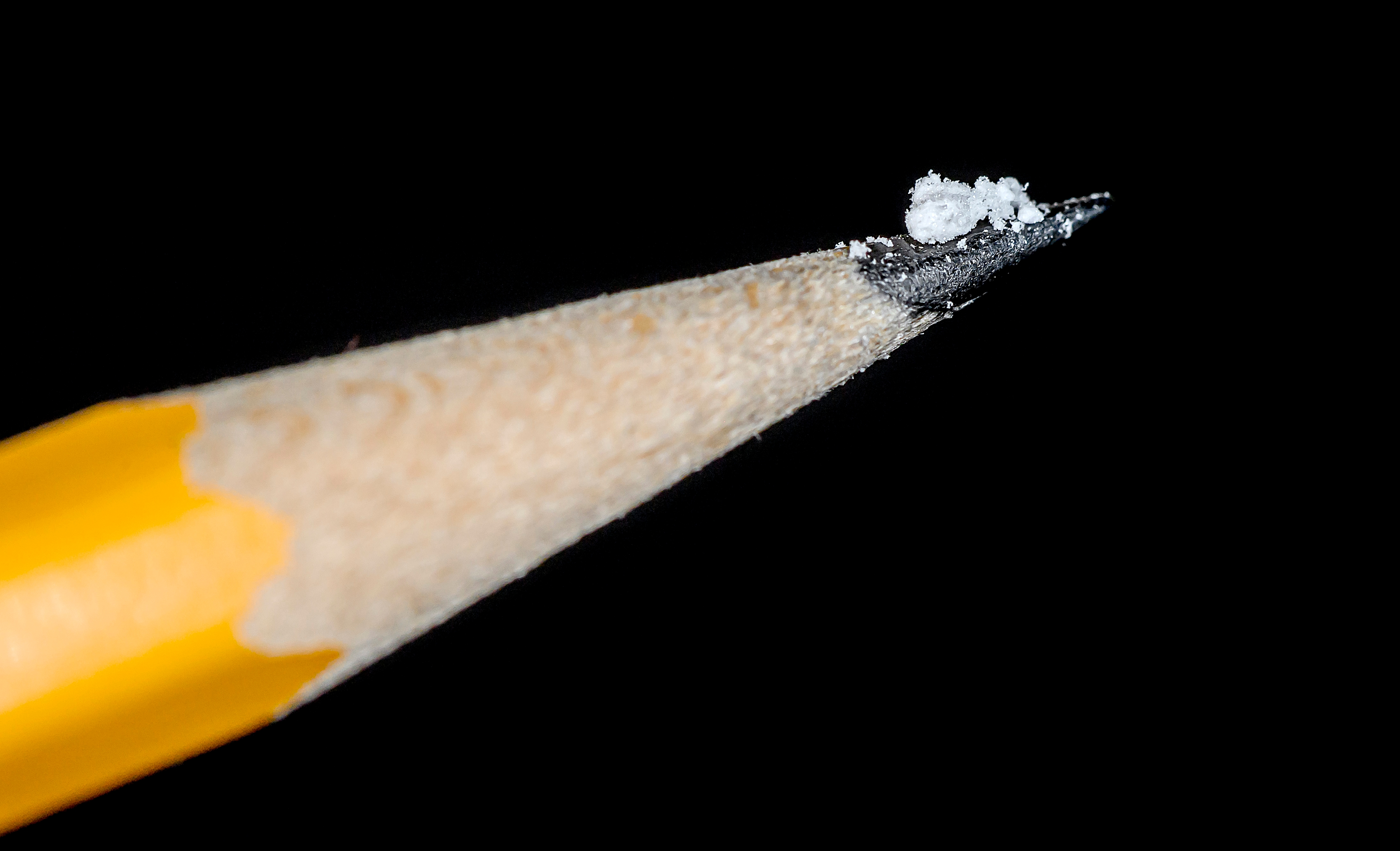
A two milligram dose of pure fentanyl powder (on pencil tip) is a lethal amount for most people.

Senate Bill 10, also known as "Melanie's Law", was a bill heard by the California Senate in 2023. The bill was named after 15-year-old Melanie Ramos, a student at Hollywood's Helen Bernstein High School who died at school in September 2022 from what was thought to be a fentanyl overdose. Her body was discovered by her friend's stepfather in one of the campus bathrooms after she had been reported missing for eight hours, according to a lawsuit filed by her family.

By expanding resources, the bill attempts to prevent fentanyl overdoses on campuses across the state. As part of a school safety plan, the legislation would compel schools to devise an action plan for student opioid overdoses. This can entail educating staff on how to give medicines like Narcan to alleviate the symptoms of an opioid overdose.

From the beginning of May to mid-June 2023, California Highway Patrol (CHP) officers in San Francisco seized over 4 kilograms of fentanyl, which the governor's office stated was sufficient to kill the population of San Francisco three times over. The seizure was conducted as a part of governor Gavin Newsom's plan, which combats the spread of fentanyl and tries to enhance public health and safety in San Francisco.

Attorney General Rob Bonta stated in June 2023 that Walgreens, CVS, and two pharmaceutical companies would have to pay a total of $17.3 billion to the state of California as part of a settlement for their involvement in the opioid crisis. Despite the drug issues in the San Francisco city, community-led harm-reduction initiatives have been stopped by Newsom and some local officials. Tenderloin Center, designed as a temporary harm-reduction measure, will be replaced by 12 smaller "wellness hubs" around the city. These hubs were designed to offer "health and shelter services", besides allowing "supervised drug use" so that overdose deaths are prevented.

Legislation that would have permitted controlled drug-use facilities in three Californian cities, including San Francisco, was vetoed by Newsom in the summer of 2022. Consequently, the plan for the wellness centers came to a standstill after San Francisco's city attorney objected that the city would end up being held heavily liable, a decision which made non-profits seek a means to finance the overdose preventive components of their activities without receiving financing from the city.

== See also ==
- Homelessness in the San Francisco Bay Area
- Opioid epidemic in the United States
