= Maneno =

Blogging application

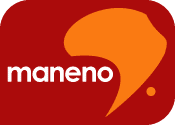
- Website type: non-profit
- Available in: English, French, Spanish, Portuguese, Bambara, Kiswahili, Lingala, Fula, Zulu
- Website: www.maneno.org
- Commercial: No
- Launched: October 18, 2008
- Current status: Offline

Maneno was a blogging application powered by PHP, Smarty, and MySQL with content management capabilities. Initially released in October, 2008, it focused on creating a multi-theme, multi-author, multi-lingual system that works in a hosted setting . The name Maneno means 'words' in Swahili and the site focused on having low latency/filesize options to make it fast to load on low bandwidth connections . Additionally, it had an architecture that allowed for heavy customization by end users.

The core of the system was envisioned after a trip to the Democratic Republic of Congo in 2008 by two of the founders. They realized that while trying to write articles from the country via VSAT connections, the connection speeds proved incredibly slow and discouraging for not only them, but anyone striving to pursue citizen journalism endeavors . Additionally it was shown that the language spheres of Africa had nearly no crossover between one another. Taking these issues into account and coming to the conclusion that no current blogging system adequately addressed them, this entirely new platform for blogging was created to serve the African blogging community.

Maneno was available in Bambara, English, Spanish, French, Fula, Swahili, Lingala, Portuguese, and Zulu. The available languages covered all of the lingua franca languages of Africa as well as a selection of large local African languages that were gradually added to. The site worked in allowing a user to be able to view and interact with the site in any one of the languages available for the interface as well as being able to translate articles and sections of the site via a crowdsourcing method .

In August 2010, Maneno announced that would be scaling back their extensive social media outreach initiatives to focus on developing the core technology of the site and as of 2014, the site is now inactive.

The Board of Directors were a group of bloggers and technology enthusiasts working to expand the platform and reach out to new bloggers. Members were: Rebecca Wanjiku , Elia Varela Serra, Saul Wainright, and Miquel Hudin.
