= Vinologue =

Publisher of wine guides

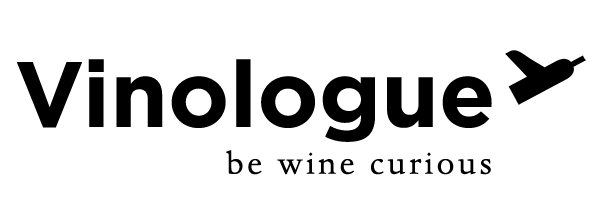
- "Be wine curious"
- Founded: 2007
- Founder: Miquel Hudin
- Country of origin: United States, Spain
- Official website: www.vinologue.com

Vinologue is a publisher of an enotourism guidebook series of the same name. It was founded by Miquel Hudin in 2007 with the guides are designed to allow those interested in enotourism to visit "Big Wines from Small Regions" as they focus exclusively on the wines as well as the gastronomy and local culture of small regions throughout the world.

The first Vinologue Guide was for Dalmatia in Croatia and was released in 2008.

== History ==
After several trips throughout Europe in the early 2000s the founders discovered that traditional travel guidebooks made little to no mention of the wines or the culture and gastronomy that surrounds it. In 2007 they started researching a guide for the coastal Dalmatia region in Croatia. While researching the guide, they found the wines of neighboring Herzegovina to be of high quality as well and decided to release two guides instead of the original one.

All of the guides were initially released in the digital EPUB format. They slowly added other titles such as Stellenbosch in South Africa. It was in 2012 that they released their first official print guide (alongside the digital version) for the Empordà region of Catalonia due to demand from the winemakers. It was the first English language enotourism guide of its kind in all of Spain. This was followed by a guide in print and digital for DOQ Priorat that was released simultaneously in separate English and Catalan editions. It was the first enotourism guide and first complete guide to the internationally renowned wines of the region.

After the first edition of the Priorat book unexpectedly sold out in 2014, they released a fully revised and much larger second edition in mid-2015.

== Methodology ==
The guides are different from other travel guidebooks in that in addition to providing travel information, history, and basic language information, they also provide reviews of the wines produced by each winery covered creating a hybrid book that is part travel guide and part wine guide, thus the name, 'vinologue' which is a portmanteau of 'vino' and 'travelogue'. The guides work to make wine both approachable and affordable for any audience and they purposefully don't award numeric scores to wines given that beyond tasting notes, they believe scores to be highly subjective and personal.

Both the print and digital editions of the guides are focused on being "21st century books" with GPS coordinates from wineries, QR Codes, and other digital media integration.

Each guide requires a great deal of work by the authors involved as they live in the region for several months while working on the research in order to achieve a full first person point of view. The guides are written fully independently; the wineries and other businesses cannot pay for inclusion in the guides and local governmental bodies do not fund publication.

The comprehensive tasting notes for the wines of the regions and accompanying scores are derived from a panel of professional sommeliers who perform all the tastings fully blind.

== Titles ==
- Vinologue Dalmatia-Herzegovina (2008)
- Vinologue Empordà (2012)
- Vinologue Priorat 1st Ed. (2013)
- Vinologue Menorca (2013)
- Vinologue Montsant (2014)
- Vinologue Priorat 2nd Ed. (2015)
- Georgia: A guide to the cradle of wine (2017)

== Awards ==
Vinologue Empordà received the Gourmand Award of "Best Enotourism Book" from a United States publisher in 2012.

Vinologue Priorat 1st Edition was a finalist for "Best Wine Book in the World" from the Gourmand Award.

Vinologue Priorat 2nd Edition was praised highly in the annual wine book reviews on the website of Jancis Robinson stating, "Quite simply, every wine region deserves an enotourism guide of this calibre, and every wine traveller wants a wine guide this good."

Georgia: A guide to the cradle of wine was named, "the definitive guide to this unique country's wines" in The Guardian.

== Popular culture ==
They were the first to coin the term, flying wine to describe wines that were made in rented facilities that the winemaker does not own. These differ from négociants in that the wines are usually side projects of a winemaker at the winery made in their spare time primarily for experimentation, as opposed to the négociant which primarily makes wine for commercial purposes. Flying wines are often encountered in Priorat, neighboring DO Montsant, and other regions where winemaking is the dominant aspect of day-to-day life.
