= Vanguard (organization) =

Defunct gay rights youth organization

Vanguard was a gay rights youth organization active from 1965 to 1967 in San Francisco, California, USA. The organization dissolved due to internal clashes beginning in late 1966. Vanguard magazine was loosely affiliated with the organization, which continued its spirit.

== History ==
In 1965, Adrian Ravarour and Billy Garrison founded Vanguard, an LGBTQ+ gay liberation youth organization in the Tenderloin neighborhood of San Francisco, California. Ravarour was inspired to form Vanguard after witnessing and learning of the disenfranchisement and discrimination LGBTQ+ youth faced in the San Francisco community at the time.

Since Ravarour was a staff member of the non-profit arts venue Intersection for the Arts, he sought permission to use the venue space for regular meetings of the new LGBTQ+ youth of Tenderloin District organization. However, this was turned down by the venue director. In Beyond the Possible, Janice Mirikitani confirmed that the non-profit director had sent the youth who started Vanguard to Glide Memorial Church. Phyllis Lyon, who knew Ravarour, provided the use of Glide's community meeting room for the first meeting. Rev. Cecil Williams welcomed the group as well to the space. After multiple meetings, the group solidified the name 'Vanguard' and reached consensus on activist activities. Ravarour from the beginning was a guiding influence over the organization's formation and development. He helped name the organization and led organizational meetings throughout the fall of 1965 into the spring of 1966. His contribution also extended to sharing philosophical and historical theory of equal rights, including the teachings of Mahatma Gandhi and Martin Luther King Jr. Decades later, Rev. Larry Mamiya recalled in his Memoir:

Vanguard was the first group of largely gay young people in the nation, organized by Adrian Ravarour (later the Rev. Dr. Ravarour). He would always be introduced at Vanguard events as the "founder". At that time, I did not know about the background of Adrian's founding philosophy, which included Mohandas Gandhi and the Rev. Dr. Martin Luther King, Jr., among others. But it certainly was in harmony with my own views about the role of nonviolence in social change movements. In retrospect, Vanguard can be seen as the spearhead of a nonviolent social change movement of young gay people, the first in the nation dedicated to bringing about social justice and equal rights.

In spring 1966, Vanguard members took action by picketing small businesses that refused to serve the LGBTQ+ youth. When others asked Vanguard to demonstrate for their causes, Ravarour insisted that Vanguard maintain its focus on LGBTQ+ rights. In May, Rev. Williams asked Ravarour to apply for the War on Poverty grant, but Ravarour declined and later resigned after electing Vanguard's next leader. Advertisements by Vanguard attracted J. P. Marat, who joined Vanguard and was elected president, becoming its spokesperson. On May 30, 1966, Hansen offered for Glide to sponsor Vanguard, which the membership voted to accept.

Glide's sponsorship began in June 1966. Mamiya was appointed Glide's first advisor to Vanguard, which was overseen by Ministers Louis Durham, Vaughn Smith, and Cecil Williams. Glide encouraged Vanguard to apply for non-profit status. Hansen began to attend meetings and assisted with the non-profit application, for which Marat was unanimously re-elected. Consultant Mark Forrester assisted it to apply for War on Poverty Equal Opportunity Commission funds. Mamiya founded the weekend Vanguard Dances, which attracted hundreds of members of the LGBT community, with DJ Mr. Friday. Despite this, Vanguard's membership experienced only small gains.

Roberts and Forrester organized a major picketing of Compton's Cafeteria in July. On a morning in August, (Note: The date of the Doggie Diner stand-off and Compton's Cafeteria riot is unknown. Police records no longer exist and the events were not covered by newspapers of the time.) Russo—who headed Vanguard's street queen coalition—ordered coffee at the Doggie Diner. When refused service, Russo broke a sugar container. For the next five hours, 17 police in riot gear surrounded Russo, Williams, Ravarour, and others. When the police withdrew, Ravarour felt as if new freedom had been won, and the trans community were emboldened. That night, the Compton's Cafeteria riot began when one of the Tenderloin street queens was insulted inside the establishment.

Vanguard protested several times the following fall, but the last months of 1966 were problematic for the organization. Marat's activities as president lessened after his requests for a salary were denied. New member Keith St. Clare took over as editor of Vanguard magazine in November. Marat withdrew Vanguard from Glide, and Vanguard subsequently fell apart.

Vanguard was granted non-profit status in January 1967, however, a few months later, Vanguard magazine stated that the group was dysfunctional and that the magazine no longer represented the defunct organization.

== See also ==
- Gay liberation
