= Boeddeker Park =

Urban park in the Tenderloin neighborhood of San Francisco

Coordinates: 37.7843°N 122.4122°W

Father Alfred E. Boeddeker Park
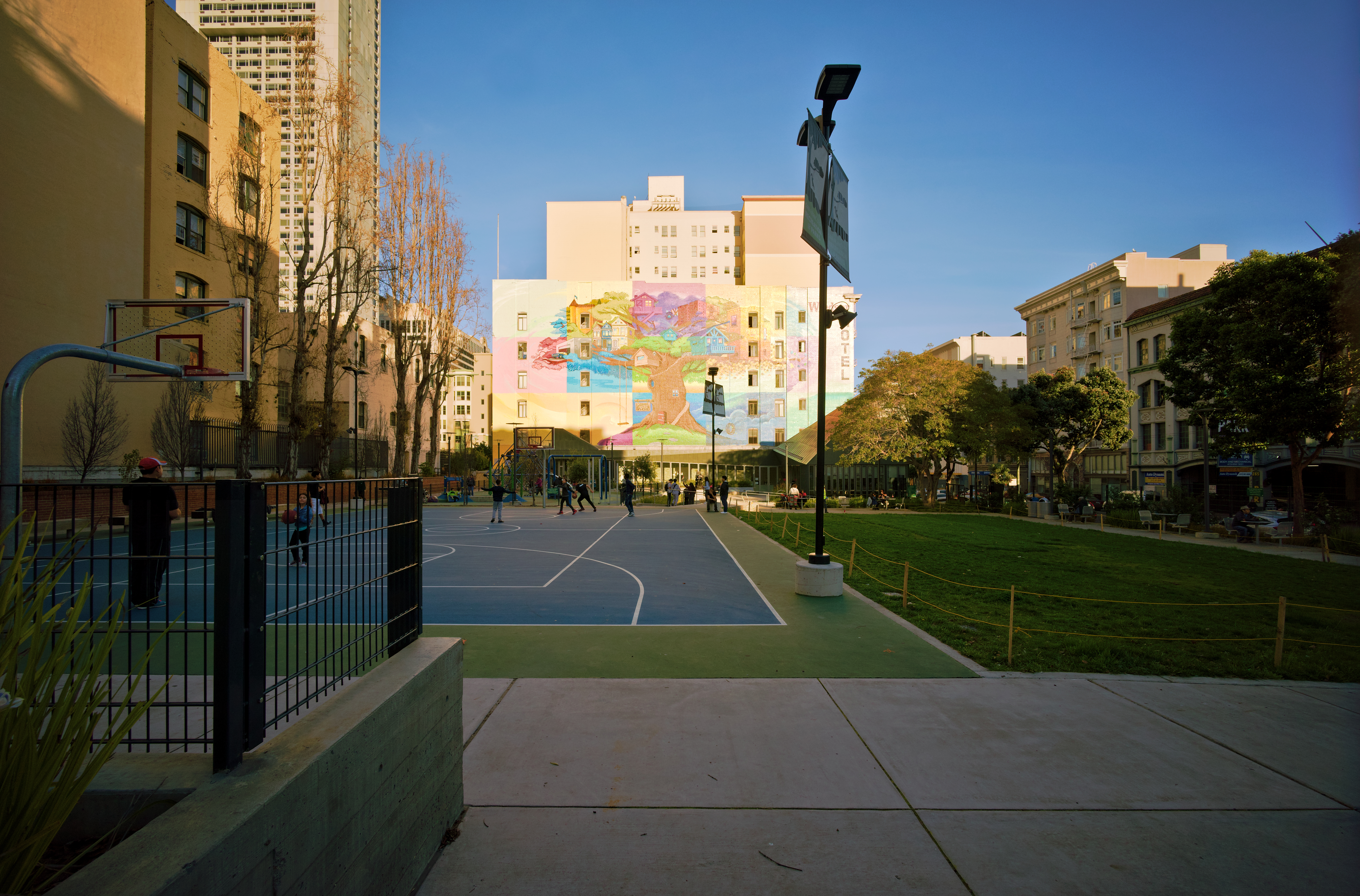
- A photo of Boeddeker Park
- Interactive map of Father Alfred E. Boeddeker Park
- Type: Urban park
- Location: San Francisco
- Designer: renovated and redesigned by The Trust for Public Land
- Operator: San Francisco Recreation and Park Department
- Open: 1985

Boeddeker Park, more formally known as Father Alfred E. Boeddeker Park, is an urban park in the Tenderloin neighborhood of San Francisco. This 1-acre park was renovated and reopened in 2014, especially intended to serve the needs of people in the surrounding neighborhood who experience amongst the highest levels of poverty in the city. The park was completed with a large mural, Everyone Deserves a Home, on the building above the park in 2016.

== History ==
The park was named after Father Alfred E. Boeddeker, a Franciscan friar who served the Tenderloin community for over forty years and founded the St. Anthony Dining Room to serve food for the poor and needy of the area. The park originally opened in 1985, and quickly became emblematic of urban decay with a lack of safe playground space for children and the growth of public drug sales. Though the area of the Tenderloin was generally diverse, the park became associated with violence and danger, causing the diversity to stay away as it increasingly became associated with drugs and crime. The park was later infused with a $9 million renovation and reopened in 2014.

== Features ==
The park includes an outdoor park with large lawn, adult exercise area with outdoor fitness equipment, a basketball court, youth play equipment, a walking path with accessible ramps. The park also has a clubhouse with a multipurpose room, office, and restrooms.

== Recognition and awards ==
Boeddeker Park won an American Institute of Architects San Francisco Honor Award for its design, a collaboration between The Trust for Public Land, the San Francisco Recreation and Parks Department, and WRNS Studio. It is certified by the Sustainable SITES Initiative for its park sustainability systems.

== See also ==
- 10-Minute Walk
