= The Tender =

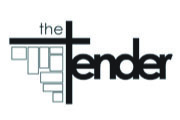
- Website type: Local news
- Available in: English
- Headquarters: San Francisco, California, United States
- Creators: Èlia Varela Serra, Miquel Hudin
- Commercial: Yes
- Launched: May 31, 2009 – November 2011
- Current status: Offline

The Tender was a news blog published 2009–2011, covering life in San Francisco's fifty square block Tenderloin District.

== History ==
Originally titled "The Tenderblog", The Tender was published by couple Èlia Varela Serra (a native of Spain) and Miquel Hudin (a native northern Californian), focusing on the Tenderloin, Civic Center, Mid-Market, Tendernob, and Little Saigon neighborhoods of San Francisco.

When Serra and Hudin returned to Serra's native Spain in November 2011, the couple stopped publication, allowing the site to go dormant, its archives remaining online.

== Content ==
With an estimated monthly readership of 40,000, The Tender focused on district current events, restaurants, arts, and general social issues — earning a place as one of San Francisco's strongest neighborhood blogs and earning the respect of San Franciscans.

Because of its in-depth knowledge of the Tenderloin, larger publications were known to pick up stories first published in The Tender, as with June 2011 coverage of a long-established diner leaving the neighborhood subsequently carried up by the San Francisco Chronicle. SFist), Eater SF, and Grubstreet SF. — and October 2010 coverage of a four-alarm apartment building fire subsequently carried by SF Weekly, SF Appeal, and SFist.

== Awards ==
The Tender was nominated for both Best San Francisco Neighborhood Blog and Best Flickr Pool in the SF Weekly - Web Awards 2011.
