= St. Anthony Foundation =

Nonprofit organization in California, US

- Founder: Alfred Boeddeker, O.F.M.
- Type: Charity
- Purpose: homelessness, poverty
- Website: www.stanthonysf.org

The St. Anthony Foundation is a nonprofit social service organization in San Francisco, California. They provide services for people experiencing homelessness and poverty, and they are best known for their operation of the St. Anthony Dining Room in the Tenderloin District. It was founded in 1950 by Franciscan friar Alfred Boeddeker to serve free meals to the poor in an ordinary restaurant-like setting.

At St. Anthony Dining Room, breakfast and lunch are served daily, including on holidays. The Dining Room has served as many as 2,500 plates of food a day, and over 37 million meals since its creation. The foundation operates a residential drug and alcohol treatment program for men, the Father Alfred Center, whose residents provide volunteer labor for the Dining Hall. Other social services are provided, including the Tenderloin Technology Lab (with more than 40 computers available for use), services for women and children, a free clothing program (by appointment only), and a Hygiene hub, where people can access showers and laundry services by appointment. Local political figures honoring the foundation include Representative Nancy Pelosi, who served the thirty five millionth meal in 2009.

In 2014, a new dining hall was opened that can serve 2000 people. In 2021, the Hygiene Hub was opened in response to the COVID-19 pandemic. In 2023, an outdoor hub, the Welcome Center, was launched, which provides referrals to essential services.
