= Donna Rose (activist) =

American transgender rights activist (born 1959)

- Born: February 22, 1959 (age 67); Chicago, Illinois, U.S.
- Education: Syracuse University
- Years active: 1997–present
- Known for: Prominent in the transgender rights movement
- Board member of: Human Rights Campaign, NGLCC, GLAAD, Out & Equal
- Website: Official website

Donna Rose is an American transgender rights activist and author. Rose began living openly as a trans woman in 1997 and has spent the years since her gender transition consulting and training on workplace transgender issues.

Rose has worked at American Airlines since 2016.

== Activism ==
Rose transitioned while working at PCS Health Systems, but she left due to the awkwardness she felt there and wanted a fresh start with a new employer. She cited her experience as "disappointing, but better than many [other trans workers]."

In 2002, she joined the Human Rights Campaign's Business Council as one of two transgender members.

In 2003, she published "Wrapped in Blue: A Journey of Discovery," which was a featured selection in the Texas Book Festival that year.

She became the first and only transgender member of the Human Rights Campaign's board of directors in 2005.

In late 2007, she resigned from both HRC positions over the organization's controversial stance to not oppose the Employment Non-Discrimination Act, which included protections against discrimination based on sexual orientation but not gender identity.

Rose's advocacy continued through other organizations, including serving as Vice Chair of Transgender Advocates of Central Texas and as a board member of HIV/AIDS organization Phoenix Body Positive. She would also join the boards of GLAAD and NGLCC from 2008 to 2010.

In 2010, she was appointed the executive director of the LGBT Community Center Coalition of Central Pennsylvania. She continued to write pieces to educate about transgender people and issues.

Rose joined the board of Out & Equal in 2017.

== Awards ==
Rose was honored with the "Trinity Award" in 2007 by the International Foundation for Gender Education.

In 2008, Campus Pride acknowledged Rose with the organization's "Voice Action Award" for her advocacy in the workplace and the classroom.

== Wrestling ==
Rose has wrestled throughout her life. She competed in the ASICS US Open Wrestling Championships in Cleveland in 2010, and received the Federation of Gay Games "Outstanding Athlete" Legacy Award at Gay Games 9 in 2014.

== Bibliography ==
- (2003) 'Wrapped in Blue: A Journey of Discovery' (Living Legacy Press) (ISBN 0972955305)
