= Tenderloin, San Francisco =

Neighborhood in California, U.S.

Tenderloin
- Neighborhood
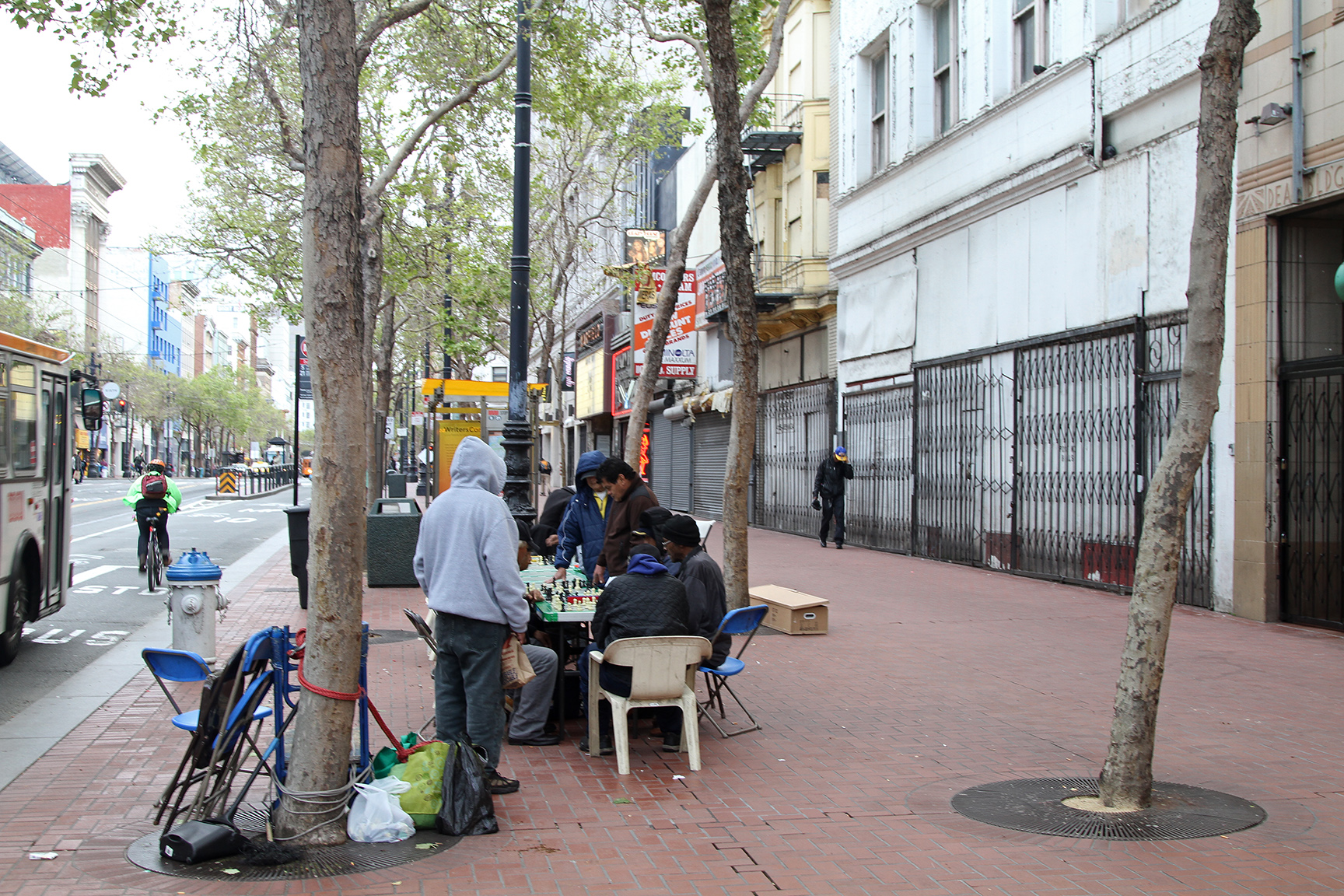
- Nicknames: The L's, The Loin, The TL, The Tendy
- Location within Central San Francisco
- Coordinates: 37°47′0″N 122°25′0″W
- Country: United States
- State: California
- City-county: San Francisco
- Named for: Tenderloin, Manhattan

Government
  - Supervisor: Bilal Mahmood
  - Assemblymember: Matt Haney (D)
  - State senator: Scott Wiener (D)
  - U.S. rep.: Nancy Pelosi (D)

Area
  - Total: 0.35 sq mi (0.91 km^{2})
  - Land: 0.35 sq mi (0.91 km^{2})
  - Water: 0 sq mi (0 km^{2}) 0%

Population (2008)
  - Total: 25,067
  - Density: 71,694/sq mi (27,681/km^{2})
- Time zone: UTC−8 (Pacific)
  - Summer (DST): UTC−7 (PDT)
- ZIP Codes: 94102, 94103, 94109
- Area codes: 415/628

The Tenderloin is a neighborhood in downtown San Francisco, in the flatlands on the southern slope of Nob Hill, situated between the Union Square shopping district to the northeast and the Civic Center office district to the southwest. Encompassing about fifty square blocks, it is historically bounded on the north by Geary Street, on the east by Mason Street, on the south by Market Street and on the west by Van Ness Avenue. The northern boundary with Lower Nob Hill has historically been set at Geary Boulevard.

It contains the Uptown Tenderloin Historic District. The terms "Tenderloin Heights" and "Tendernob" refer to the area around the boundary between the Upper Tenderloin and Lower Nob Hill. The eastern extent, near Union Square, overlaps with the Theater District. Part of the western extent of the Tenderloin, Larkin and Hyde Streets between Turk and O'Farrell, was officially named "Little Saigon" by the City of San Francisco.

The area has a reputation for crime, homelessness, and open-air drug markets. It is the center of the fentanyl crisis in San Francisco.

The Tenderloin is also known for the families and communities that have lived in the neighborhood. It has the highest concentration of children in San Francisco, with an estimated 3000 children in the neighborhood, mostly coming from immigrant families. The neighborhood includes a Little Saigon, a historically Vietnamese section on two blocks of Larkin Street. The Tenderloin has a rich LGBTQ history, including historic gay bars and a Transgender Cultural District that encompasses the site of the Compton's Cafeteria riot.

== History ==
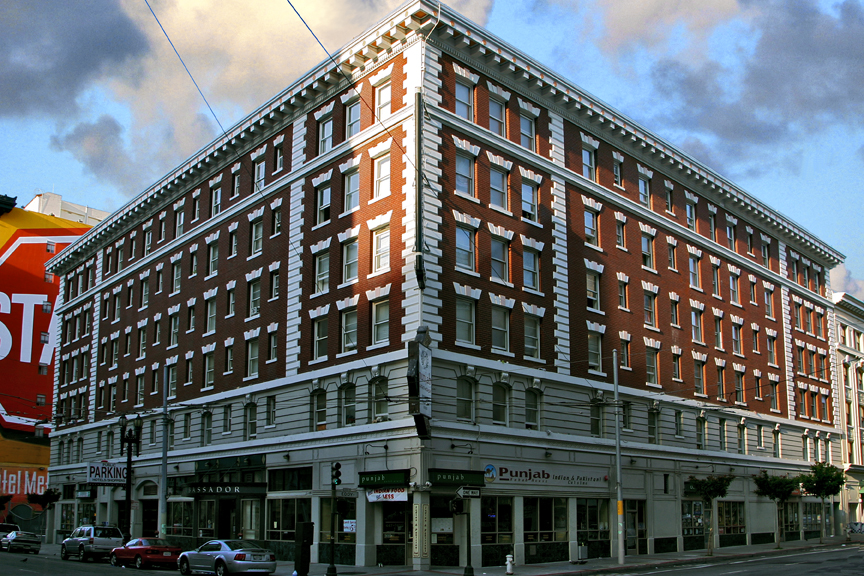
The Ambassador Hotel is a neighborhood renovated single-room occupancy building that sits on the eastern edge of the Tenderloin.

The Tenderloin took its name from an older neighborhood in New York with similar characteristics. There are several explanations of how that neighborhood was named. Some attribute the name to a New York City police captain, Alexander S. Williams, who was overheard saying that when he was assigned to another part of the city, he could only afford to eat chuck steak on the salary he was earning, but after he was transferred to this neighborhood he was making so much money on the side soliciting bribes that now he could afford to eat tenderloin ('filet mignon') instead.

The Tenderloin borders the Mission/Market Street corridor, which follows the Spaniards' El Camino Real, which in turn traced an ancient north–south Native American trail. The Tenderloin is sheltered by Nob Hill, and far enough from the bay to be on solid ground. There is evidence that a community resided here several thousand years ago. In the early 1970s, the area along Market Street was excavated to develop the BART/MUNI subway station at Civic Center and the west side of subway station at Powell Street.

The Tenderloin has been a downtown residential community since shortly after the California Gold Rush in 1849. However, the name "Tenderloin" does not appear on any maps of San Francisco prior to the 1930s; before then, it was labeled as "Downtown", although it was informally referred to as "the Tenderloin" as early as the 1890s. The area had an active nightlife in the late 19th century with many theaters, restaurants and hotels. Notorious madam Tessie Wall opened her first brothel on O'Farrell Street in 1898.

Almost all of the buildings in the Tenderloin were destroyed by the 1906 earthquake and the backfires that were set by firefighters to contain the devastation. The area was immediately rebuilt, with some hotels opening by 1907 and apartment buildings shortly thereafter, including the historic Cadillac Hotel. In 1911 the Cort Theatre opened at 64 Ellis Street. At that time it was one of the largest theaters in San Francisco. It was the original venue for the San Francisco Symphony which played its first concert there on December 8, 1911.

By the 1920s, the neighborhood was notorious for its gambling, billiard halls, boxing gyms, "speakeasies", theaters, restaurants and other nightlife depicted in the hard boiled detective fiction of Dashiell Hammett, who lived at 891 Post Street, the apartment he gave to Sam Spade in The Maltese Falcon. Also around this time, due to Red Light Abatement Act, prostitution and other vice began to be pushed out from the Barbary Coast district to the more southern and less business-occupied Tenderloin.

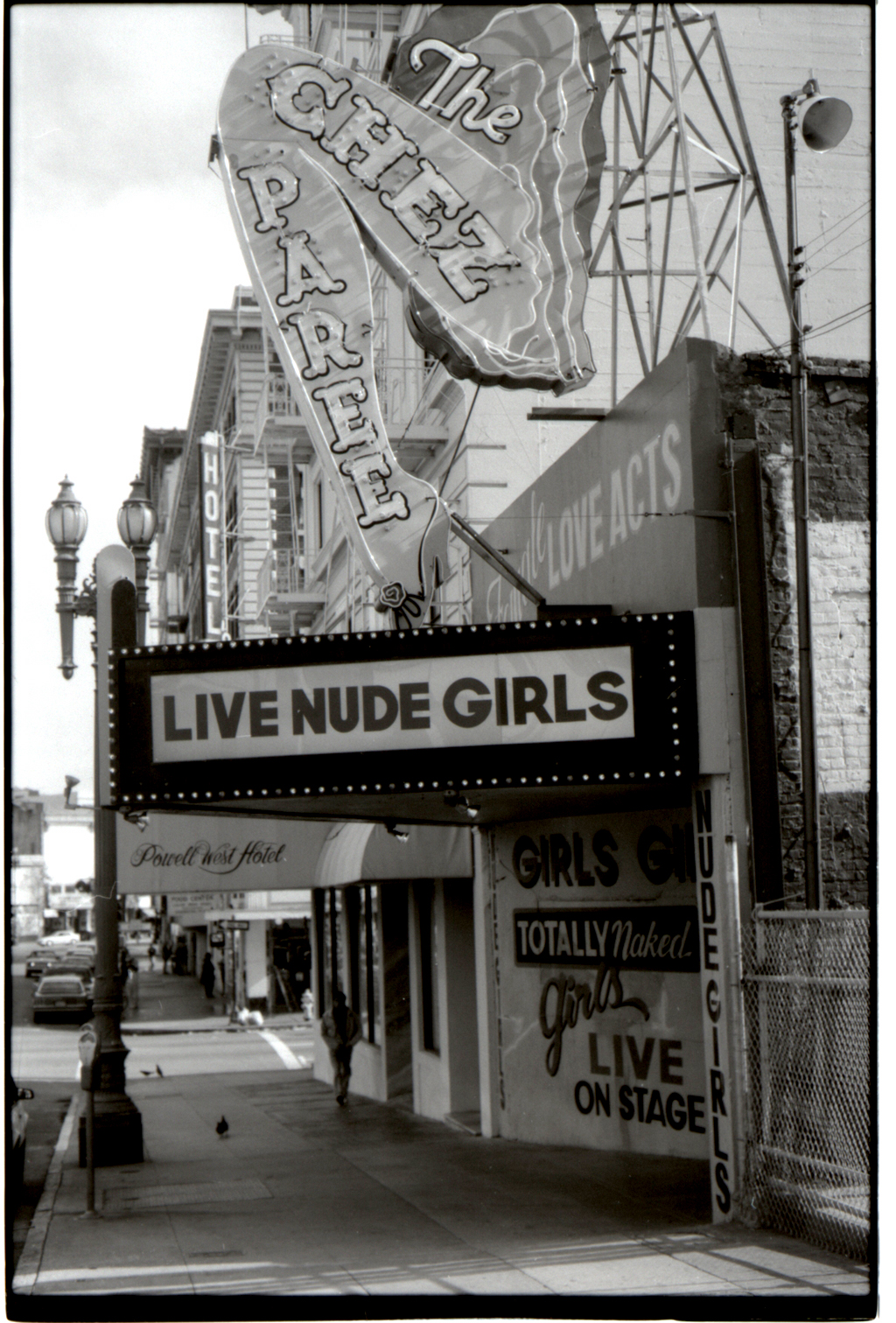
Tenderloin strip club in 1991

In the mid-20th century, the Tenderloin provided work for many musicians in the neighborhood's theaters, hotels, burlesque houses, bars and clubs and was the location of the Musician's Union Building on Jones Street. The most famous jazz club was the Black Hawk at Hyde and Turk Streets where Dave Brubeck, Miles Davis, Thelonious Monk, Gerry Mulligan, and other jazz musicians recorded live albums for Fantasy Records in the late 1950s and early 1960s.

With housing consisting almost entirely of single-room-occupancy hotel rooms, studio and one bedroom apartments, the Tenderloin historically housed single adults and couples. After World War II, during a period of decline in central cities throughout the United States, the Tenderloin lost population, resulting in a large number of vacant housing units by the mid-1970s.

Beginning in the late 1970s, following the Vietnam War, the Tenderloin received large numbers of refugees from Southeast Asia—first ethnic Chinese from Vietnam, then Khmer from Cambodia and Hmong from Laos. The low-cost vacant housing, and the proximity to Chinatown through the Stockton Street Tunnel, made the area appealing to refugees and resettlement agencies. Studio apartments became home for families of four and five people and became what a local police officer called "vertical villages." The Tenderloin quickly increased from having just a few children to having over 3,500 and this population has remained. A number of neighborhood Southeast Asian restaurants, bánh mì coffee shops, ethnic grocery stores, video shops, and other stores opened at this time, which still exist.

The Tenderloin has a long history as a center of alternate sexualities, including several historic confrontations with police. The legendary female impersonator Ray Bourbon, a performer during the Pansy Craze, was arrested in 1933 while his show "Boys Will Be Girls" was being broadcast live on the radio from Taits Cafe at 44 Ellis Street. In the evening of August 13, 1961, 103 gay and lesbian patrons were raided in the Tay-Bush Inn, a café frequently visited by gay and lesbian patrons. As a response to police harassment, S.F. bar owners formed the San Francisco Tavern Guild. A study into prostitution in the Tenderloin found that while trans women face discrimination from certain professions and their sexual partners, sex workers in the Tenderloin area were adept at overcoming some such difficulties.

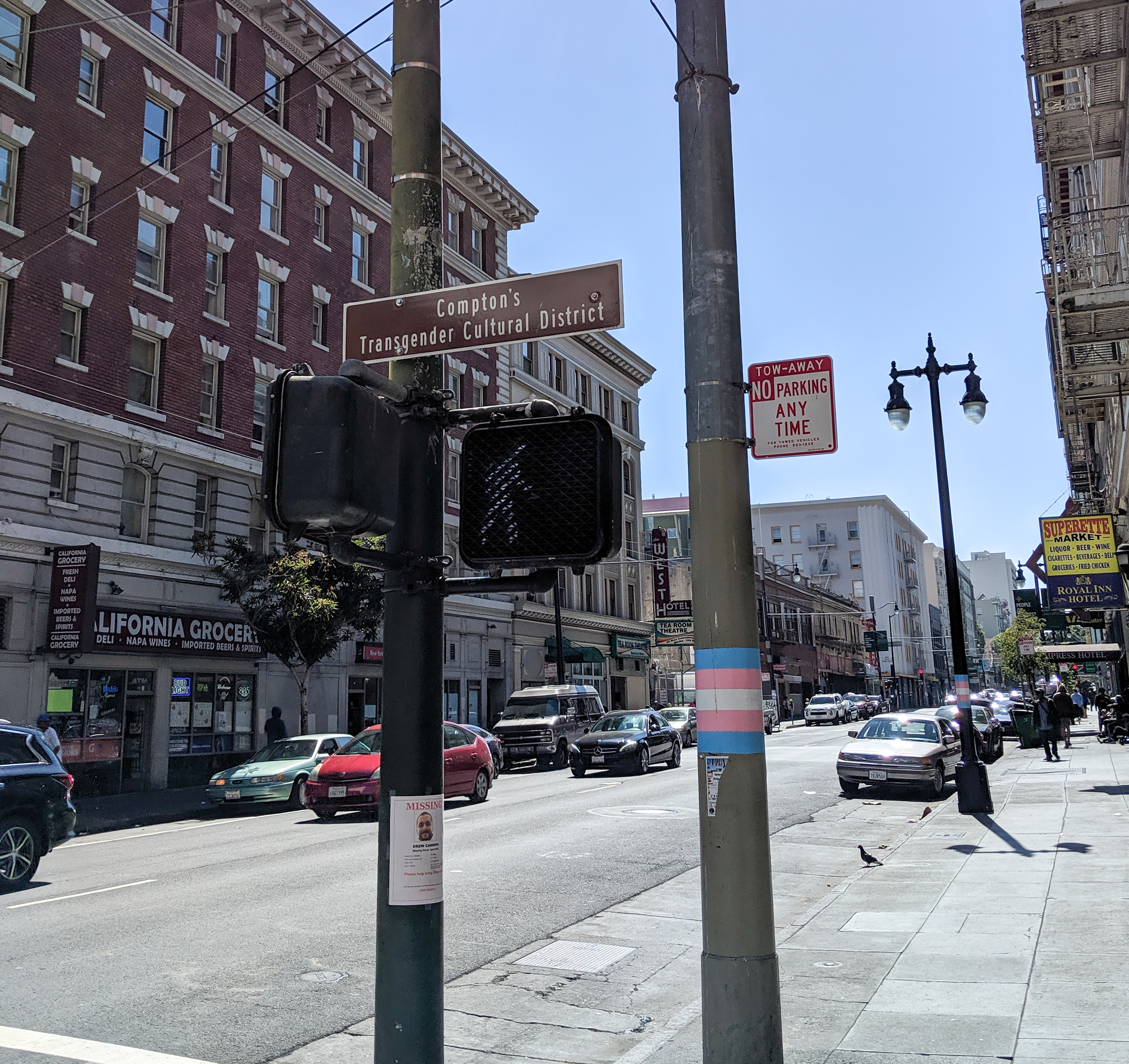
A sign reads "Compton's Transgender Cultural District" at the intersection of Eddy and Mason streets in the Tenderloin. Poles in the background are painted with the blue, pink, and white colors of the Transgender Pride Flag.

On New Year's Day in 1965, police raided a Mardi Gras Ball at California Hall on Polk Street sponsored by the Council on Religion and the Homosexual, lining up and photographing 600 participants and arresting several prominent citizens. One of the first "gay riots", pre-dating the Stonewall riots in New York, happened at Compton's Cafeteria at Turk and Taylor Streets in August 1966 when the police, attempting to arrest a drag queen, sparked a riot that spilled into the streets. The group ended up smashing the windows of the police car and burned a nearby newspaper stand to the ground; the riot promoted the formation of the Gay Activists Alliance. Prior to the emergence of The Castro as a major gay village, the center of the Tenderloin at Turk and Taylor and the Polk Gulch at the western side of the Tenderloin were two of the city's first gay neighborhoods; a few of these historic gay bars and clubs still exist.

The apartment where Dashiell Hammett wrote The Maltese Falcon was once in the boundaries of the Tenderloin at the corner of Hyde and Post. Both the movie and book were based in San Francisco's Tenderloin. There is also an alley in what is now Nob Hill, named for the book's author (Dashiell Hammett). It lies outside the Tenderloin because the boundary was defined with borders different from today's. Some locations, such as Sam Spade's apartment and John's Grill, also no longer lie in the Tenderloin because local economics and real estate have changed the character and labeling of areas over time.

In July 2008, the area was designated as a historic district on the National Register of Historic Places.

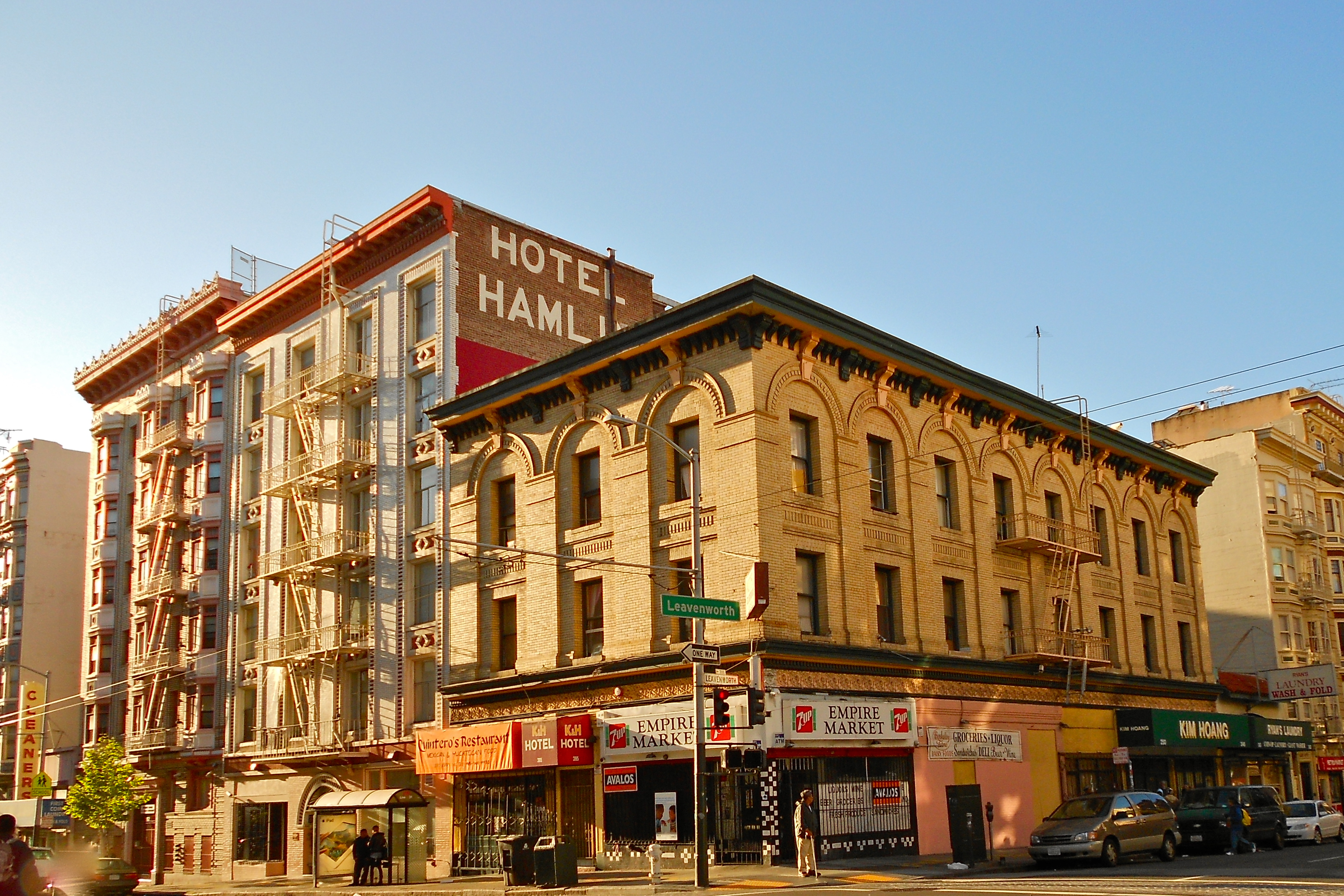
Uptown Tenderloin Historic District

In 2017, a portion was declared the Compton's Transgender Cultural District commemorating the historic transgender population and culture and in particular, the 1966 transgender and queer uprising, and the Compton's Cafeteria riot.

== Attractions and characteristics ==
Nestled near the downtown area, the Tenderloin has historically resisted gentrification, maintaining a seedy character and reputation for crime. Squalid conditions, homelessness, crime, illegal drug trade, prostitution, liquor stores, and strip clubs give the neighborhood a seedy reputation.

Part of the neighborhood forms part of the theater district. Prominent theatres include the Geary, the home of the American Conservatory Theater, and the Curran, Golden Gate and Orpheum Theatres operated by the Shorenstein Nederlander Organization. Alternative theaters in the Tenderloin include EXIT Theatre, which operates four storefront theaters and produces the San Francisco Fringe Festival, the New Conservatory Theater, the Phoenix Theater, CounterPulse, PianoFight, the New Music Center and others. Alternate galleries include The Luggage Store, the 509 Cultural Center, and others. The neighborhood had many bars dating to prohibition and before with dive bars, including some left over from when the neighborhood housed large numbers of merchant seamen but most of those have closed or been transformed. One bar is built on the site of a previous speakeasy, Bourbon and Branch, at the corner of Jones and O'Farrell Streets. The original speakeasy was restored in the bar's basement, including many of the original decorations. Many bars have entertainment including the historic drag bar Aunt Charlie's. Larger live music venues include the Great American Music Hall and the Warfield Theatre. Historically, the Tenderloin has had a number of strip clubs, although their number has decreased in recent decades. The best known was the Mitchell Brothers O'Farrell Theatre. The Tenderloin is also a hub for the gender diverse community. The categories of LGBTIQ created a new gender politics that helped to distinguish between the different groups; the Tenderloin was heavily populated by the transgender community. Many street activists paved the way for change, such as Anne Ogborn.

In his seminar 'Take Charge of Your Life', Jim Rohn recounted his visits to the Tenderloin to experience the "human tragedy". He described his visit to a bar in the Tenderloin where the bar tender told him about a dancer by the name of Cookie, who was severely disabled and had a child suffering from leukemia.

== Crime ==
The Tenderloin is a high-crime neighborhood, particularly violent street crime such as robbery and aggravated assault. Graffiti art and tagging are common in the neighborhood. Dealing and use of illicit drugs occurs on the streets. Property crimes are common, especially theft from parked vehicles. Violent acts occur more often here and are generally related to drugs. The area was the scene of escalating drug violence in 2007, including brazen daylight shootings, as local gangs from San Francisco, and others from around the Bay Area battle for turf. Fourteen of the city's 98 homicides (1 in 7) took place in the area in 2007. Seven of the top 10 violent crime plots (out of 665 in the entire city as measured by the San Francisco Police Department) are adjacent plots in the Tenderloin and Sixth and Market area.

The first block of Turk Street, between Taylor and Mason, had one of the highest rates of violence and drug activity in San Francisco, according to a survey conducted by the Tenderloin Housing Clinic. On January 31, 2014, parking was banned on both sides of the street in an effort to reduce violence and drug activity. Without parked cars to hide illegal activity, there were fewer loiterers, and a decrease in drug activity.

According to The New York Times, streets in the Tenderloin are littered with thousands of discarded heroin needles, and the sidewalks "have come to resemble a refugee camp". Public defecation and urination are commonplace, and between 2015 and 2018, more than 300 lampposts were replaced because they had been corroded by urine.

The neighborhood was the origin of a notorious Bahala Na Gang (BNG) imported from the Philippines. In the late 1960s to the mid-1970s, the gang was involved in extortion, drug sales, and murder for hire. Additionally, on April 10, 1984, notorious serial killer Richard Ramirez committed his first known murder in a hotel basement, where he was living, in the Tenderloin district.

In the 2020s, the Tenderloin has experienced many of San Francisco's fentanyl deaths.

== Social issues ==
High prevalence of sex work in the Tenderloin area has been associated with a high rate of sexually transmitted infections, including HIV, especially among men who have sex with other men and those who inject drugs. Contributing factors include a lack of sex education and safe sex practices, including condom use. In a 2000 survey, 59% of men who performed sex with other men did not report condom use, with higher rates of unsafe sex practices among those who are not engaged in paid sex work.

== Gentrification concerns ==
Due to Tenderloin's numerous health and safety concerns, the property value in the district is very low compared to other areas of the city. As such it has been feared by the district's residents that there would be a concerted gentrification of Tenderloin, seeing an influx of affluent individuals move to the district, resulting in a spike in prices that would cause the neighborhood to no longer be viable for its current residents. However, Tenderloin residents have taken steps to prevent this, namely due to most of the district being owned by non-profit SROs, most of which were built in the '70s and '80s for rehabilitation spaces for drug addicts and the still-ostracized gay community. Additionally, Tenderloin is zoned to prevent the construction of high-rises, and most of its buildings are protected historical properties. As such there has not been a concerted effort to revitalize Tenderloin, allowing it to retain its high crime rates and low property values.

In the mid-2010s, upwards of 10,000 employees in the tech sector, such as Google and Yahoo!, moved into Tenderloin and Mid-Market neighborhoods to take advantage of the low rent and prices, resulting in significant community backlash. Community residents would protest Google employees going to work while some welcomed them and the redevelopment that comes with them. However, by 2018 these revitalization efforts would largely end due to a resurgence of crime, and a reduction in the district's police resources.

== Murals ==
The Tenderloin serves as a mecca for the art scene in San Francisco, housing the "White Walls" gallery and "Shooting Gallery". The Tenderloin has been home to mural work by artists such as Johanna Poethig, Banksy, Shepard Fairey, Barry McGee, and Blek le Rat.

== Social services ==
The Tenderloin has been the home of Raphael House, the first provider in the city of shelter for homeless parents and children, since 1971. It is an ethnically diverse community, consisting of families, young people living in cheap apartments, downtown bohemian artists, and recent immigrants from Latin America and Southeast Asia. It is home to a large population of homeless, those living in extreme poverty, and numerous non-profit social service agencies, soup kitchens, religious rescue missions, homeless shelters and single-room occupancy hotels. Many homeless youths in the Tenderloin district are at risk of serious emotional and psychological problems arising from past traumatic experiences. Lack of appropriately targeted options available in the area has meant many youths will have few viable paths to deal effectively with their problems.

The Tenderloin Housing Clinic has offered important social services to the poor of this neighborhood for decades. The Care Through Touch Institute, located between Hyde and Leavenworth Streets, offers free seated massage therapy to clients in the Tenderloin community. The founder and director of CTI, Mary Ann Finch, began offering services here in 1997, after being inspired by her volunteer work with Mother Teresa in India.

Religious institutions providing community services to the Tenderloin include Glide Memorial Church, which was reinvigorated by Cecil Williams in 1963, St. Anthony's, a program of the Franciscans, and San Francisco City Impact founded in 1984 by Pastor Roger Huang. San Francisco City Impact's K-8 private school, the San Francisco City Academy, was the first K-8 school in the Tenderloin District; founded in 1997. These all provide meals and other social services to poor and homeless residents and others. Glide and the surrounding neighborhood provided much of the setting for the 2006 film The Pursuit of Happyness. In 2008, The Salvation Army opened the Ray and Joan Kroc Community Center, a multipurpose center featuring a gym, swimming pool and fitness center among other amenities. The funding for this center was made possible by a $1.5 billion bequest from Joan Kroc, the widow of McDonald's founder, Ray Kroc. Adjacent to the Kroc center is Railton Place, a 110-unit apartment complex run by the Salvation Army for former foster youth, homeless veterans, and adults recovering from addictions. In 2016, the Tenderloin Community Benefit District (TLCBD) announced the implementation of a new public-private initiative, Operation Leadership, which aims to help strengthen existing street cleaning and beautification services.

As transgender women often face barriers such as discrimination and stigma when accessing health care, and show reluctance to disclose their gender when seeking health related services, a collaborative project named 'TRANS' was set up near the Tenderloin to appropriately address the multifaceted needs of this diverse population, as well as offering support.

In their study, Sausa, Keatley, Operario (2007) concluded that sex work for transgender women of color must be viewed as a forced consequence of structural barriers that they face, as well as an informed choice for survival as a result of these barriers.

The Tenderloin Senior Organizing Project (TSOP; formerly known as the Tenderloin Senior Outreach Project) was initiated when local university staff realized that many seniors felt afraid of crime, rent increases, and inadequate income. They facilitate interpersonal communication through coffee & refreshments, and groups of elderly people were encouraged to meet each other.

Larkin Street Youth Services is a non-profit organization that offers a continuum of services that inspires youth to move beyond the street. Services run the gamut from street outreach and temporary shelters to transitional living programs, health and wellness services, and comprehensive education and employment programs.

== Culture ==
In 1987, residents and others from the Aarti Hotel on Leavenworth Street founded the 509 Cultural Center at 509 Ellis Street. After the 1989 earthquake damaged that facility, artists founded the Luggage Store Gallery at 1007 Market, at the intersection of 6th Street, Market, Taylor and Golden Gate Avenue. In 1989 the Tenderloin Reflection and Education Center (TREC) spun off from St Anthony foundation and operated a cultural center including dance, music, writing quilting, and other arts workshops in the St. Boniface Neighborhood Center. TREC and its publishing project Freedom Voices continue to offer workshops on an occasional basis at the Public Library, Hospitality House, the Faithful Fools and other locations in the neighborhood. Tender Leaves, the center's literary journal was published from 1987 to 2006.

From 2006 to 2009, The Loin's Mouth – conceived by its editor Rachel M. – was a semi-quarterly publication about life in the Tenderloin and Tendernob areas. Since then, others have come about to fill the gap including the Tenderloin Reading Series, which is a quarterly literary event in the neighborhood as well as The Tender, a local journal focusing on the events, food, and politics of the neighborhood.

In 2006, Gray Area Foundation for the Arts was formed to produce, exhibit, and develop creativity with the most contemporary new media technologies. Initially located on Taylor Street in an 8,000 sq ft (740 m^{2}) space, they have since moved.

In the past the local Vietnamese Community has hosted the Tết celebration of the Vietnamese Lunar New Year in the Little Saigon section of the Tenderloin.

== Parks and recreation ==
Historically, the downtown Tenderloin had no park between Union Square to the East and Civic Center Plaza to the West until a number of activists, who organized the city's Citizens Committee for Open Space, advocated for more open space in the Tenderloin in the 1970s. As a result, a number of parks and playgrounds were created including first Boeddeker Park, a multi-use facility, then the youth-oriented Tenderloin Playground, followed by a number of mini-playgrounds.

Boeddeker Park, located at the corner of Eddy and Jones Streets, is one of the most used parks per square foot in the city. It underwent a renovation, completed in December 2014, which has revitalized the park. YMCA and the Boys and Girls Club occupy the clubhouse, providing programming for youth and seniors. "It's the hub of positive community togetherness", Tenderloin police Capt. Jason Cherniss said of the park. "It's not necessarily police, it's community. It's ripe for that now. We're all getting more connected and sharing information."

The Tenderloin Children's Playground, on Ellis Street between Leavenworth and Hyde Streets, was opened in 1995 and has attractive indoor and outdoor recreational facilities and hosts a number of community and family events.

Sgt. John Macaulay Park, named after a San Francisco police officer who was killed in the adjacent alley while on duty, is a small gated playground at the corner of O'Farrell and Larkin Streets. Although the park is located across the street from a strip club, it is frequented by parents and children from the neighborhood.

The "Tenderloin National Forest" (a project of the nonprofit organization The Luggage Store/509 Cultural Center) is an unofficial park that was established in 1987 that maintains the park and opening hours. It is located on Cohen Alley just off Ellis Street.

== Renaming attempt ==
In March 2011, People for the Ethical Treatment of Animals (PETA) Vice President Tracy Reiman sent Mayor Ed Lee a letter proposing renaming of the neighborhood and suggesting an alternative name like the Tempeh District, claiming "the city deserves a neighborhood named after a delicious cruelty-free food instead of the flesh of an abused animal". The proposal was widely met with ridicule from locals, and Mayor Lee responded that it was more important to improve the lives of the residents than to rename the neighborhood.

== See also ==
- Tenderloin, Manhattan
- The Tender
- Hospitality House
- Sound of Music (punk club)
