= Lower Nob Hill Apartment Hotel District =

Historic district in San Francisco County, California, U.S.

- U.S. National Register of Historic Places
- U.S. Historic district
- California Historical Landmark
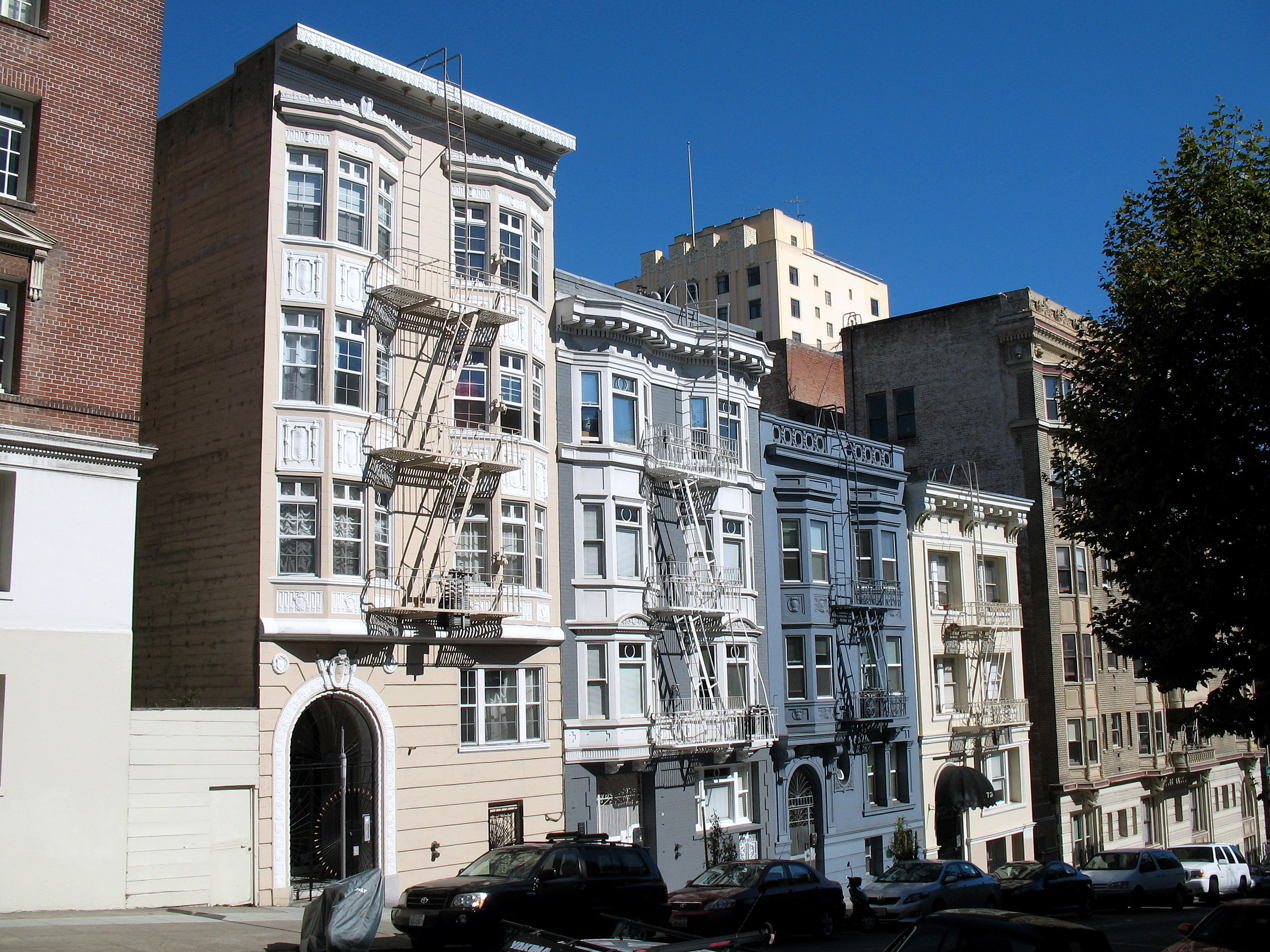

- Location within San Francisco County Location within California
- Location: Roughly bound by 590–1209 Bush, 680–1156 Sutter, and 600–1099 Post Streets, San Francisco, California
- Coordinates: 37.789°N 122.416°W
- Area: 57 acres (23 ha)
- Built: 1906
- Architectural style: Late 19th And Early 20th Century American Movements, Late 19th And 20th Century Revivals, Renaissance
- NRHP reference No.: 91000957
- CHISL No.: N1708

Significant dates
- Added to NRHP: July 31, 1991
- Designated CHISL: July 31, 1991

The Lower Nob Hill Apartment Hotel District is a historic district located in downtown San Francisco, California, in an area that sits between the Nob Hill and Tenderloin neighborhoods. It covers roughly a five-block stretch on the southern slope of Nob Hill, but due to its location between California Street (Nob Hill's southern border) and Geary Street (the Tenderloin's northern border), the district is often considered part of downtown San Francisco. The area is sometimes referred to as 'Tendernob,' a colloquial term that reflects the blending of the two neighborhoods, and is also commonly called 'Lower Nob Hill' by real estate agents and developers to market properties in this transitional zone.

The Lower Nob Hill Apartment Hotel District is officially listed on the National Register of Historic Places and is a California Historical Landmark due to its architectural significance and its role in the social history of San Francisco. The district features many early 20th-century apartment hotels that were once home to middle-class residents and now reflect the architectural styles of that era. Though historically linked to Nob Hill, its location closer to downtown and the Tenderloin gives the district a unique, transitional identity between the two neighborhoods.

== Location ==
It covers roughly a 5-city block length in downtown San Francisco on the south slope of Nob Hill; in the south boundary of the district is adjoining the Tenderloin neighborhood, and in the west it is adjoining the Polk Street/Van Ness corridor. It is bound by 590–1209 Bush, 680–1156 Sutter, and 600–1099 Post Streets. This district is located near other National Register of Historic Places defined historic districts, at the south is the Uptown Tenderloin Historic District.

There are social differences between living on the lower hill versus living in the "flatlands" of the Tenderloin, and researchers have defined the neighborhood break line at Post Street. Since the early 20th century, the rents in the Lower Nob Hill have been higher than in the Tenderloin.

== Architecture ==
The Lower Nob Hill Apartment Hotel District is architecturally remarkable for its dense multiple-unit residential buildings, unequaled in quantity and quality anywhere in California except possibly in the Tenderloin. It has 296 contributing buildings, and most are at the height of three to seven stories.

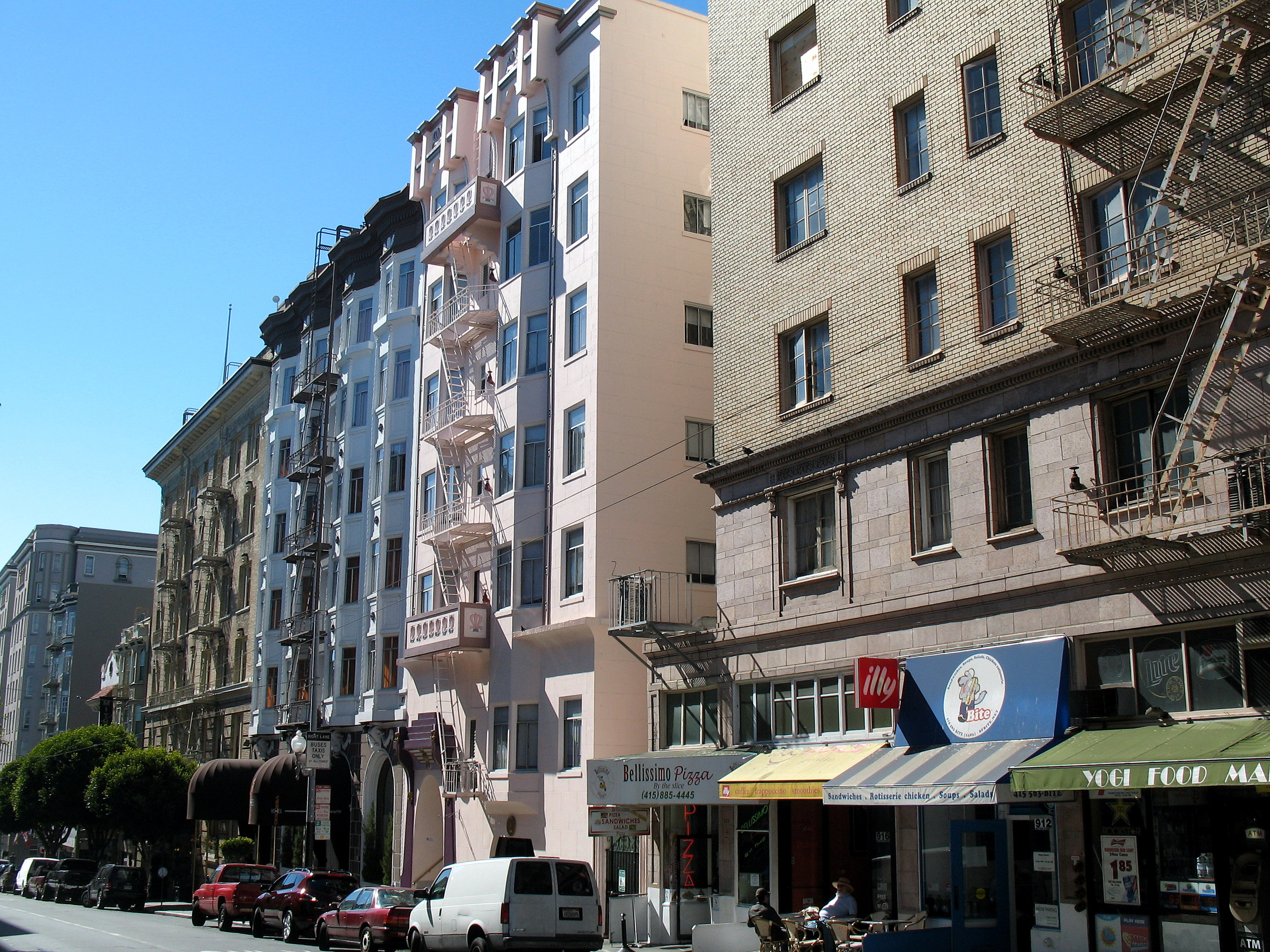
North side of Sutter Street between Hyde and Leavenworth (2012), Lower Nob Hill Apartment Hotel District, San Francisco

Historically there has been a progression of many of the building types (in both the district and the city), from boarding house to lodging house to hotel to apartments. After the 1906 earthquake, this district burned for three days and demolished all of the buildings. Because of the outcome of the 1906 earthquake, virtually the entire district was constructed between 1906 and 1925. The city enacted a rule for using fireproofing materials in the new construction. Early buildings (1906–1910) tend to simple brick facades with a little corbeling; after about 1912 many buildings were influenced by Mission/Spanish/Mediterranean revival influence with flat brick or stucco facades; late buildings (1929–1935) tend to Art Deco, especially the Maurice Hotel at 761 Post Street, and 820 Bush Street.

Notable architects and firms that designed building in the Lower Nob Hill Apartment Hotel District included Frederick Herman Meyer, Sylvain Schnaittacher, G. Albert Lansburgh, James Francis Dunn, Herman Carl Baumann, Charles Oliver Clausen, and Rousseau & Rousseau. The streetlights at 680–1140 Sutter Street were designed by sculptor Arthur Putnam with "The Winning of the West" (c. 1908) bases, installed with architects D. H. Burnham & Co.

== History ==
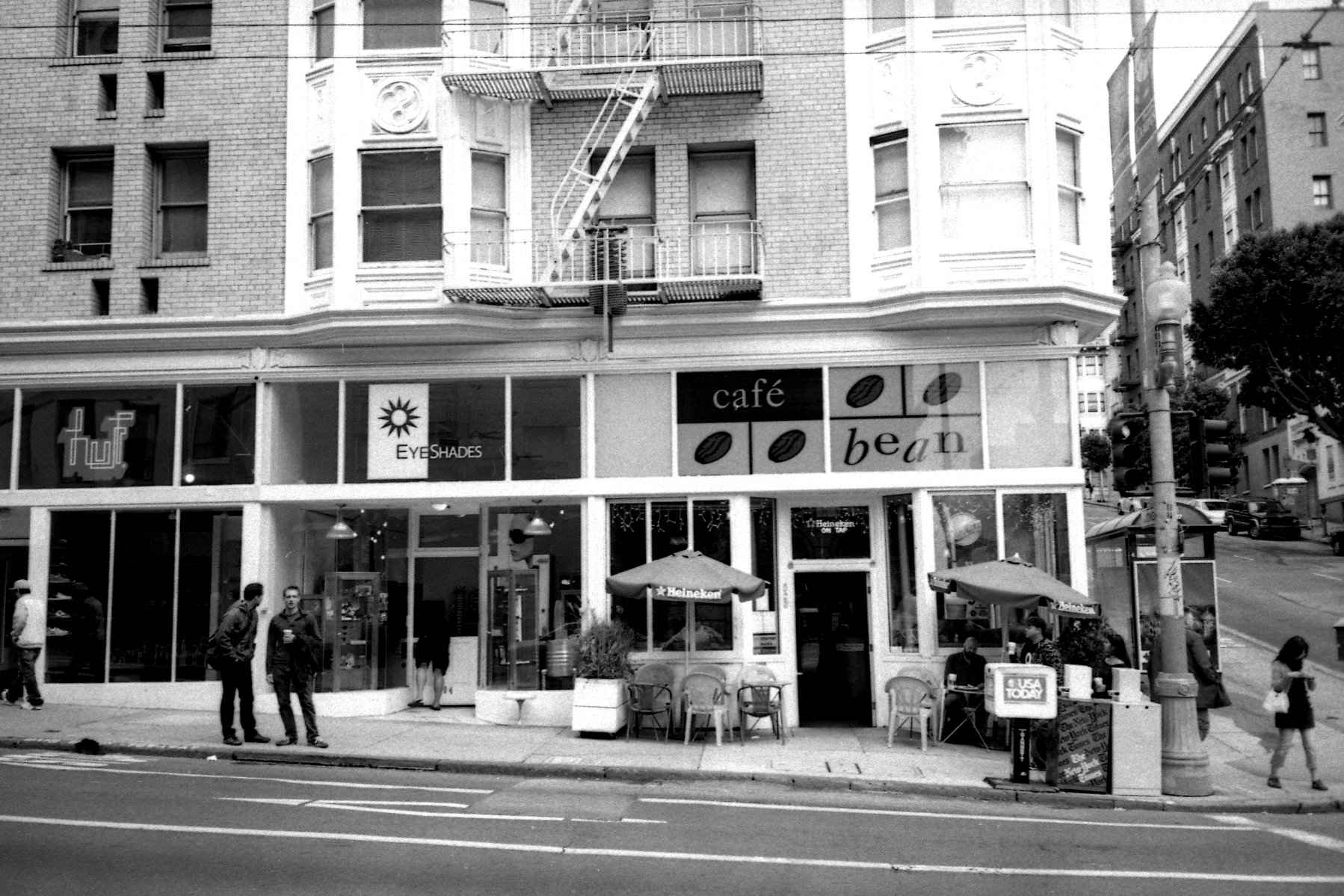
Bus stop at Sutter and Jones Streets

In 1911, William Lawrence Murphy the inventor of the Murphy bed, lived in the district at 625 Bush Street. About a third of the buildings in the district were built for the 1915 Panama–Pacific International Exposition.

Academy of Art University owns and uses several buildings in this area for both housing and educational purposes.

This district was the subject of Dashiell Hammett's The Maltese Falcon (1930) with the fictional private detective Sam Spade living in the area. The film Vertigo (1958) by Alfred Hitchcock features a book shop named the Argosy that was inspired by the Argonaut Book Shop at 786 Sutter Street; and when Kim Novak walks into a hotel as the character Judy Barton, that hotel is now known as Hotel Julian (1928) at 940 Sutter Street.

In 1961, the Tay-Bush Inn raid occurred at 3:00 AM at roughly 900 Bush Street; this event was pivotal for gay rights in the city.

== List of notable buildings ==
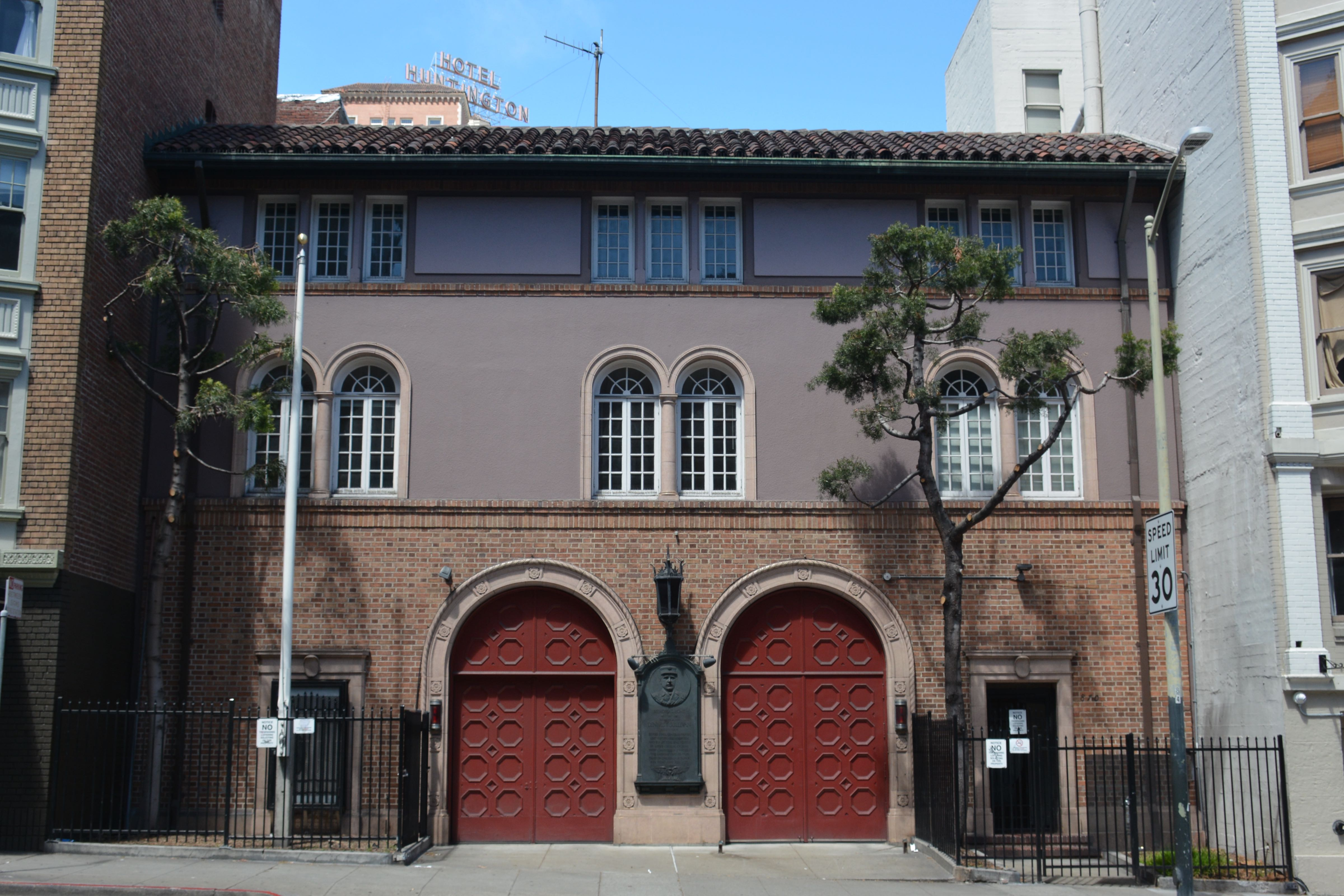
Dennis T. Sullivan Memorial Fire Chief's Home (1922), 870 Bush Street

- Victoria Hotel (1907), 590 Bush Street
- Beck Apartments (1909), 660 Bush Street; architects Cunningham and Politeo
- Angelus Apartments (1911), 645 Bush Street; architects Righetti and Headman
- Colonial Hotel (1912), 650 Bush Street; architects Cunningham and Politeo
- Calvert Hotel Apartments (1913), 637–639 Bush Street; architects Righetti and Headman
- Edison Apartments (1914), 618 Bush Street; architects Rousseau and Rousseau
- Dennis T. Sullivan Memorial Fire Chief's Home (1922), 870 Bush Street; listed as a San Francisco Designated Landmark
- The Gaylord Hotel (1929), 620 Jones Street; architect Herman C. Baumann

== See also ==
- California Historical Landmarks in San Francisco County, California
- National Register of Historic Places listings in San Francisco
- Hotel Carlton
