= Cadillac Hotel =

Cadillac Hotel may refer to:

- Cadillac Hotel & Beach Club, Miami Beach, Florida
- Cadillac Hotel (San Francisco, California), NRHP-listed as part of the Uptown Tenderloin Historic District
- Westin Book Cadillac Hotel, Detroit, Michigan, a hotel
