= Marjory Collins =

American photojournalist (1912–1985)

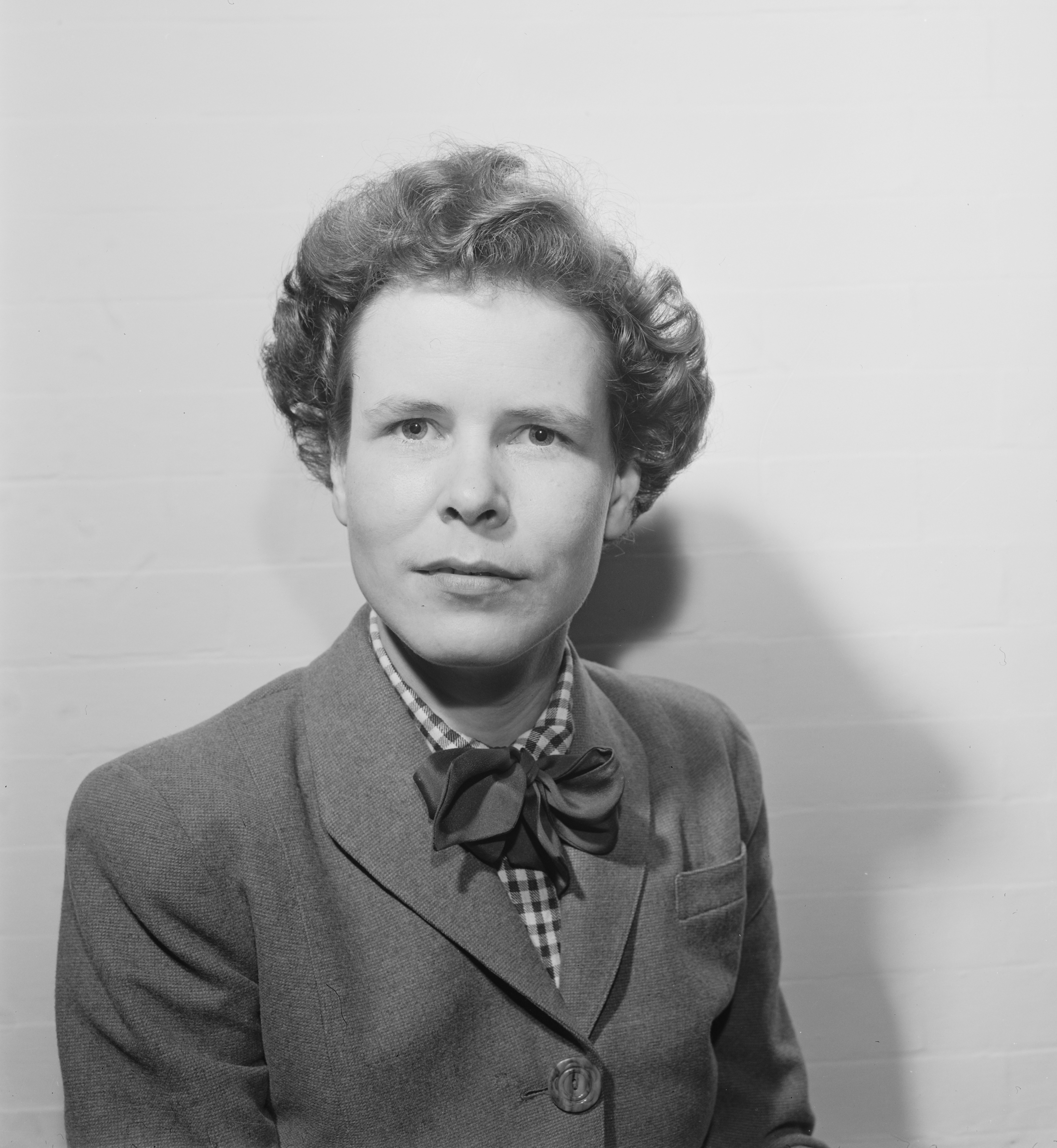
- Marjory Collins (c. 1943)
- Born: March 15, 1912; New York City, U.S.
- Died: 1985 (aged 73); San Francisco, California, U.S.
- Education: Sweet Briar College; Ludwig-Maximilians-Universität München; Antioch University (San Francisco)
- Occupations: Photojournalist, writer

Marjory Collins (15 March 1912 – 1985) was an American photographer and writer, known for her coverage of the United States home front during World War II for the Farm Security Administration and the Office of War Information.

== Personal life ==
Marjory Collins was born on 15 March 1912, to Elizabeth Everts Paine and writer Frederick Lewis Collins in New York City, and grew up in nearby Scarsdale, Westchester County.

She died in 1985 at the age of 73.

== Education ==
Collins studied at Sweet Briar College and the Ludwig-Maximilians-Universität München. In 1935, Collins moved to Greenwich Village, and over the next five years she studied photography informally with Ralph Steiner and attended Photo League events. In the 1980s she moved to San Francisco where she obtained an M.A. in American Studies at Antioch College West.

== Career ==
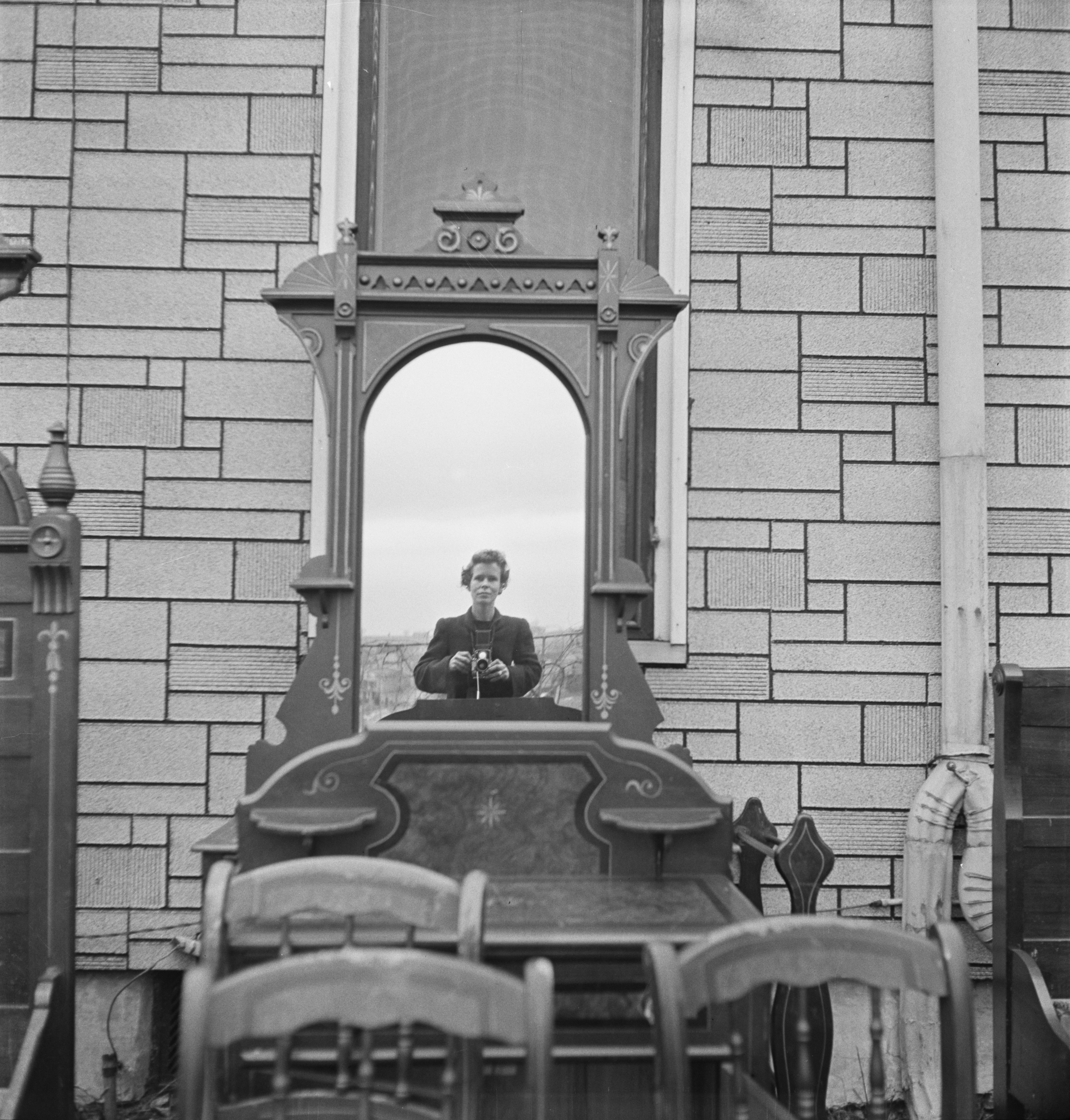
Self-portrait, Lititz, Pennsylvania, 1943

Collins' work as a documentary photographer was taken up by major agencies. As a result of a contribution for U.S. Camera and Travel about Hoboken, New Jersey, she was invited to work for the Foreign Service of the United States Office of War Information. She completed some 50 assignments there with stories about the American way of life and support for the war effort. In line with new emphasis on multiculturalism, she contributed to photographic coverage of African Americans as well as citizens of Czech, German, Italian and Jewish origin.

In 1944 Collins worked freelance for a construction company in Alaska before travelling to Africa and Europe on government and commercial assignments. Thereafter, she worked mainly as an editor and a writer covering civil rights, the Vietnam War and women's movements. In the 1960s she edited American Journal of Public Health. Collins was very active politically; a feminist, she founded the journal Prime Time (1971–76) "for the liberation of women in the prime of life." In 1977, Collins became an associate of the Women's Institute for Freedom of the Press.

Her work is included in the collection of the Museum of Fine Arts Houston.

== Gallery ==
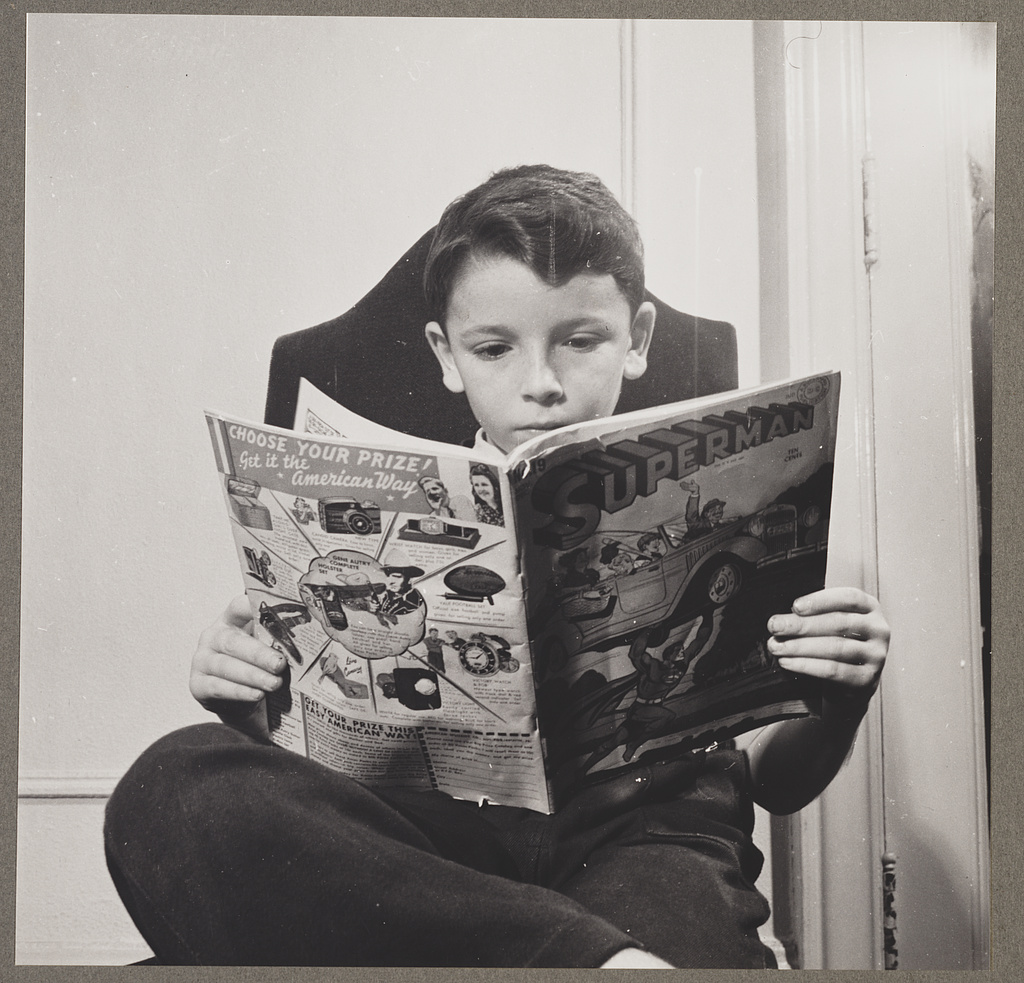
New York, N.Y. Children's Colony, German refugee child, reading a Superman comic book

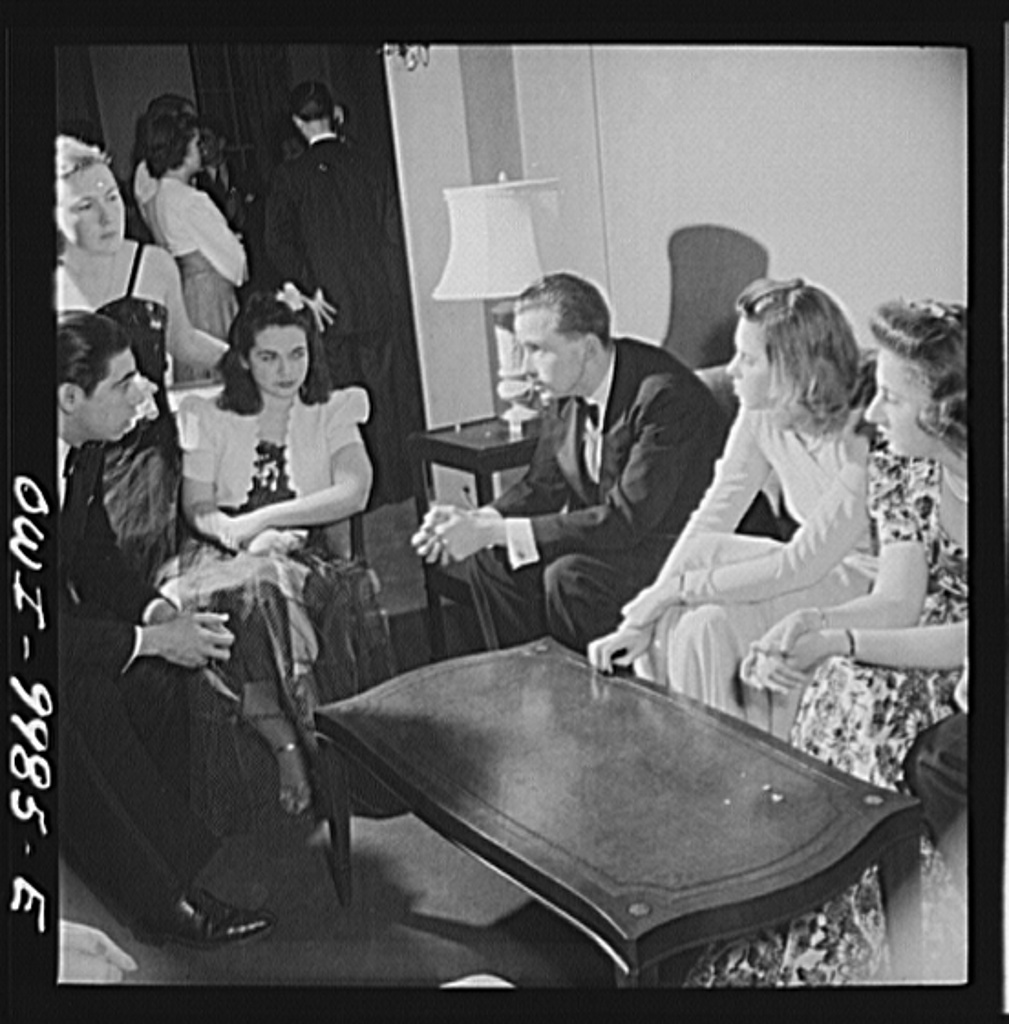
200 high school students chosen for their intellectual alertness visited Washington for a week

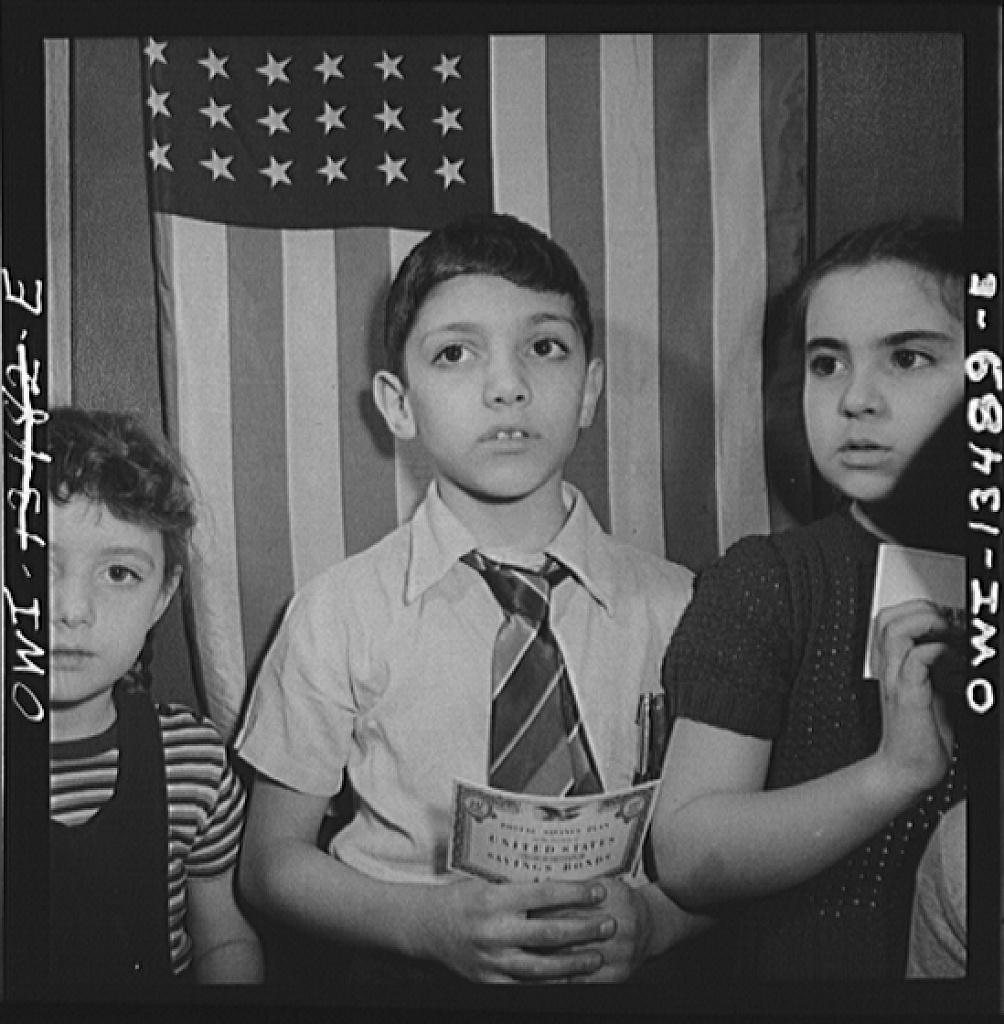
Children waiting in line to buy defense stamps at public school from mothers who volunteer to guard doorways and perform other duties in schools

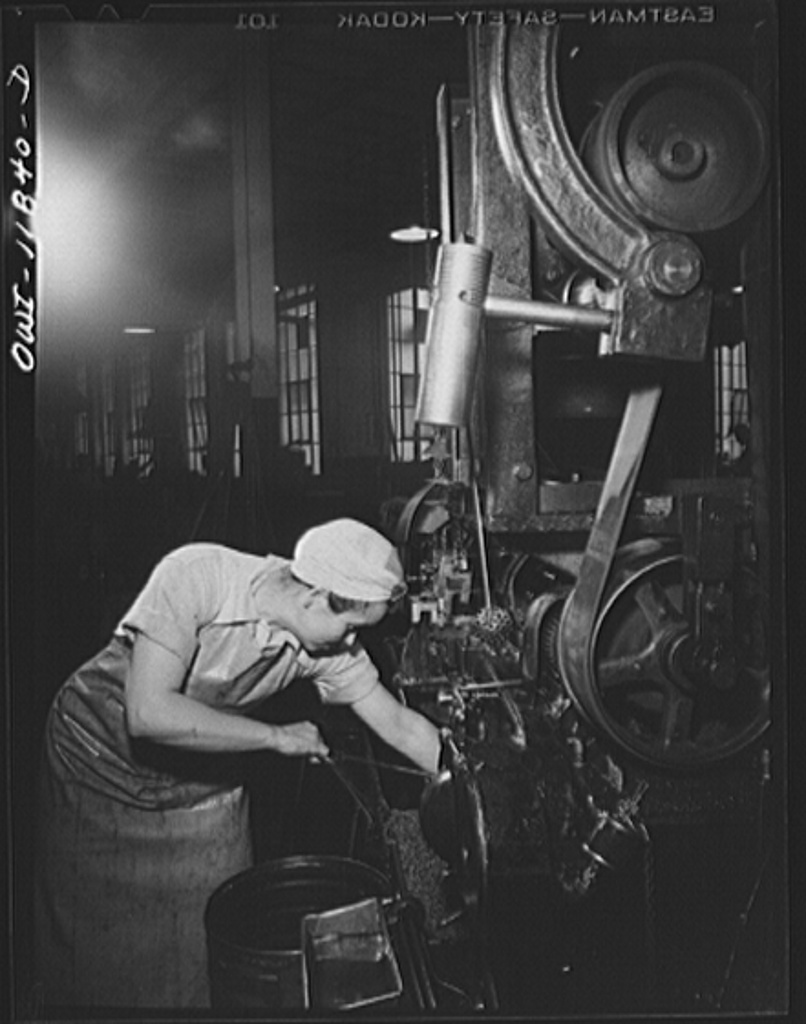
Emma Dougherty who does a man's work for a man's pay, cleaning out her end-grinding machine
