= Looper =

Looper may refer to:

== Animals ==
- Cabbage looper (Trichoplusia ni), a member of the moth family Noctuidae
- Inchworm, of the insect order Lepidoptera, the moths and butterflies

== People ==
- Looper (surname), a Dutch-language surname with the meaning "runner"

== Other uses ==
- Looper, a (usually electronic) tool for creating music loops
- Looper, a person traveling the Great Loop, the circumnavigation of eastern North America by water
- Looper (band), a Scottish indie pop band
- Looper (film), a 2012 American science fiction film
- Looper (website), a film, television, and video game news website owned by ZergNet
- "Looper", a song by Joe Satriani from his 2018 album, What Happens Next
- Tape loop, loop of magnetic tape used to create repetitive, rhythmic musical patterns or dense layers of sound when played on a tape recorder

== See also ==
- Loopers, a 2021 Japanese video game
