= Hank Wilson =

LGBT rights activist

Henry "Hank" Wilson (April 29, 1947, in Sacramento, California – November 9, 2008, in San Francisco, California) was a longtime San Francisco LGBT rights activist and long term AIDS activist and survivor. The Bay Area Reporter noted that "over more than 30 years, he played a pivotal role in San Francisco's LGBT history." He grew up in Sacramento, and graduated with a B.A. in education from the University of Wisconsin–Madison in 1971.

== LGBT activism ==
Wilson founded or co-founded many organizations, including the Gay Teachers Coalition; the Butterfly Brigade, which became the Castro Street Safety Patrol; San Francisco Gay Democratic Club, which became the Harvey Milk Lesbian, Gay, Bisexual, Transgender Democratic Club; the Tenderloin AIDS Network, which became Tenderloin AIDS Resource Center; the PWA Coalition; Mobilization Against AIDS; a film festival that grew into the Frameline Film Festival; the AIDS Candlelight Vigil, which became the International AIDS Candlelight Memorial; the Committee to Monitor Poppers and ACT UP/Golden Gate, which became Survive AIDS.

== Political and artistic career ==
With Tom Ammiano and Ron Lanza, Wilson co-founded the Gay Teachers Coalition in 1975 and lobbied against discrimination for gay teachers in the San Francisco schools. A leader in the 1977 anti-Briggs Initiative (No on 6) campaign, Wilson worked extensively with gay issues in the San Francisco Unified School District. He served on the Gay Youth Advocacy Council which founded Lavender Youth Recreation and Information Center (LYRIC). He also served on the San Francisco Human Rights Commission's Youth and Education Committee and also launched with Ammiano a gay speakers bureau to educate San Francisco high school and middle school students about gay and lesbian issues. In 1976 he helped found the Butterfly Brigade, Castro Street Safety Patrol, and Carry a Whistle Defense Campaign.

Wilson was a founder of the Harvey Milk Gay Democratic Club.

In 1978, he started a business partnership with fellow activist Ron Lanza, which led to leasing four Tenderloin hotels. He operated the Ambassador Hotel in San Francisco's Tenderloin through 1996 and it became a model of harm reduction services housing PWAs. In 1982, Lanza and Wilson created the Valencia Rose Cafe, an influential gay cabaret and performance venue, which featured musicians and comedians such as Marga Gomez, Whoopi Goldberg, Lea DeLaria, and Ammiano. With Glenda Hope and Dennis Conkin he founded Tenderloin AIDS Network that led to the Tenderloin AIDS Resource Center (TARC). Wilson managed the TARC drop-in center, providing support to the homeless and PWAs. He was diagnosed with Kaposi's sarcoma in 1987. He continued his activism in AIDS and participated in many demonstrations.

In 1981 he founded the Committee to Monitor Poppers to educate the gay community about the supposed hazards of using poppers. Wilson co-authored a book with John Lauritsen entitled Death Rush: Poppers and AIDS (New York: Pagan Press, 1986), in which they conjectured a connection between poppers and AIDS, especially Kaposi's sarcoma, an AIDS-related cancer.

In 1999, Wilson was an instigator of efforts to gather signatures to qualify Ammiano as a write-in candidate for the 1999 San Francisco mayoral election. Ammiano got enough votes in the general election to force incumbent mayor Willie Brown into a runoff.

Wilson was a candidate for the San Francisco Board of Supervisors in the 2000 election, which marked the return of district elections, which had been abolished in the wake of the assassinations of Harvey Milk and George Moscone. He ran for District 6 but did not win.

On November 9, 2008, Wilson died of lung cancer at Ralph K. Davies Medical Center in San Francisco.

== Bibliography ==
- Hank Wilson and John Lauritsen, Death Rush: Poppers and AIDS (New York: Pagan Press, 1986) ISBN 0-943742-05-6
- Benjamin H. Shepard, White Nights and Ascending Shadows: An Oral History of the San Francisco AIDS Epidemic (London and Washington, DC: Cassell, 1997) ISBN 978-0-304-70126-1

== See also ==
- Joe Acanfora
