= Paige Motor Car Co. Building =

- U.S. National Register of Historic Places
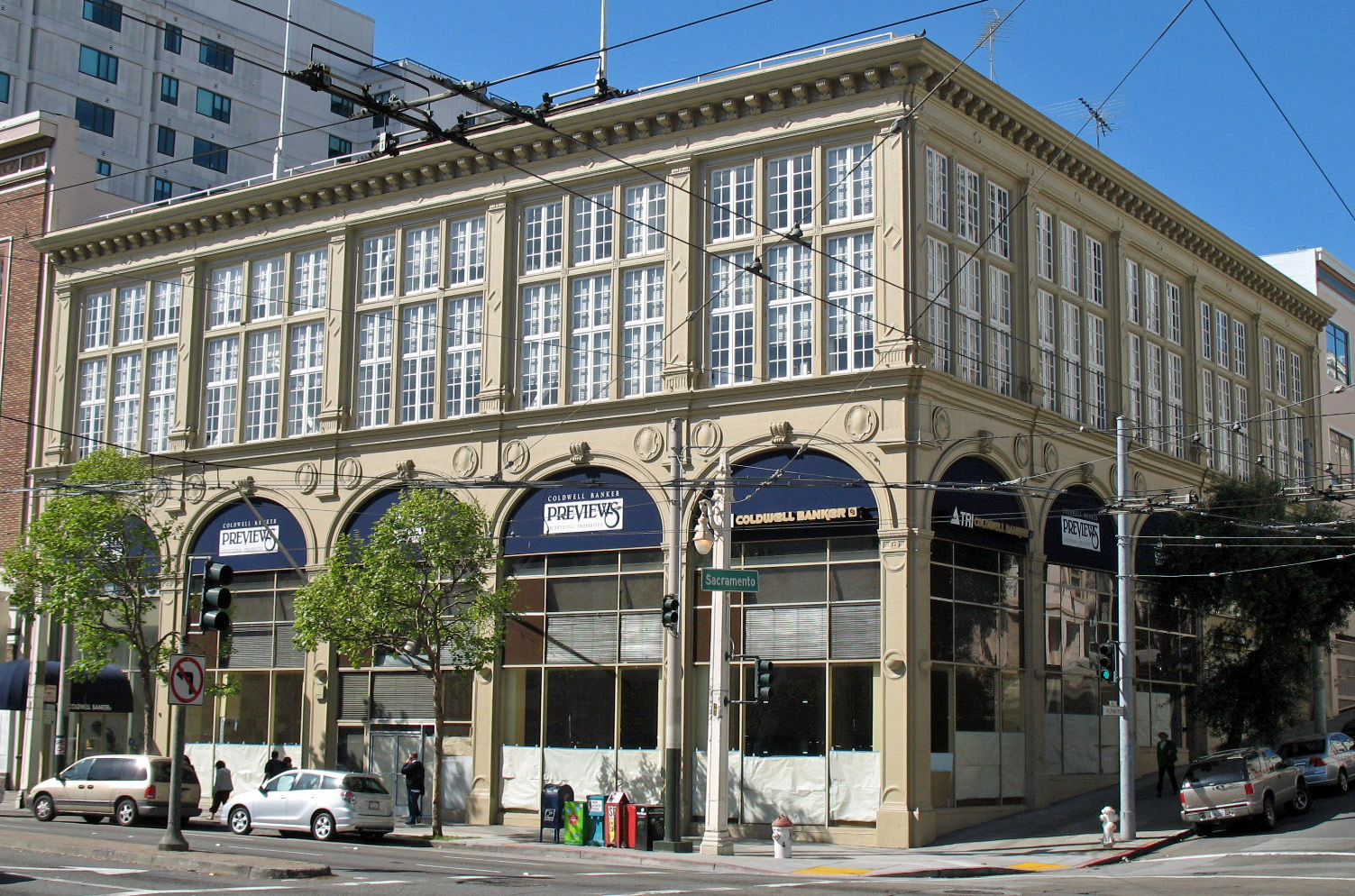

- Location within San Francisco County Location within California Location within the United States
- Location: 1699 Van Ness Ave., San Francisco, California
- Coordinates: 37°47′28″N 122°25′22″W
- Area: 0.2 acres (0.081 ha)
- Built: 1919, 1922
- Architect: Sylvain Schnaittacher
- Architectural style: "granolithic"
- NRHP reference No.: 83001234
- Added to NRHP: February 24, 1983

The Paige Motor Car Co. Building, at 1699 Van Ness Avenue in San Francisco, California, was built in two phases in 1919 and 1922. It was listed on the National Register of Historic Places in 1983.

It was designed by architect Sylvain Schnaittacher and has been described as having a "granolithic" finish.
