= Miriam Allen deFord =

American novelist (1888–1975)

- Born: August 21, 1888; Philadelphia, Pennsylvania, U.S.
- Died: February 22, 1975 (aged 86); San Francisco, California, U.S.
- Occupation: Writer

Miriam Allen deFord (August 21, 1888 - February 22, 1975) was an American writer best known for her mysteries and science fiction. During the 1920s, she wrote for a number of left-wing magazines including The Masses, The Liberator, and the Federated Press Bulletin. Her short story, A Death in the Family, appeared on the second season, episode #2, segment one, of Night Gallery.

== Biography ==
=== Work and beliefs ===
Born in Philadelphia, deFord studied at Wellesley College and Temple University. She later studied at the University of Pennsylvania. She worked as a newspaper reporter for a time. She later described herself as a "born feminist" and was active in the Women's suffrage movement before 1920. A campaigner and disseminator of birth control information to women, she was a member of the Socialist Party of America from 1919 to 1922.

Her feminist work is documented in From Parlor to Prison: Five American Suffragists Talk About Their Lives, edited by Sherna B. Gluck. During the 1930s, deFord joined the Federal Writers' Project and wrote the book They Were San Franciscans for the Project. Interviewed for the League of American Writers pamphlet Writers Take Sides about the Spanish Civil War, deFord expressed strong support for the Spanish Republic. She added, "I am unalterably and actively opposed to fascism, Nazism, Hitlerism, Hirohitoism, or whatever name may be applied to the monster."

deFord was an atheist, and for a series in The Literary Guide in 1940 contributed a short history of her own beliefs. She wrote:

One day my father, a surgeon whom I had never known to enter a house of worship, nevertheless took me to task in regard to some anti-religious comment I had uttered. He questioned me about my theological beliefs, and said with horror: "You’re no better than an Atheist!” It was the final guerdon. Instead of being shocked I hugged the accusation to me. There was a word for what I believed; there must be others who believed the same things! I walked out of the house and down the street proudly saying to myself: “I’m an Atheist; I'm an Atheist!” I have been one ever since.

=== Writing career ===
Most of her writing focused on mystery fiction and science fiction and she published several anthologies in mystery and crime writing. In 1960, she wrote The Overbury Affair, which looked at events surrounding the murder of Sir Thomas Overbury during the reign of James I of Britain - for this work she received a 1961 Edgar Award from the Mystery Writers of America for Best Fact Crime book.

In 1949, The Magazine of Fantasy & Science Fiction was created, with Anthony Boucher as editor. He was known for his science fiction and fantasy but also garnered attention in the mystery field as well, which gave his magazine some cross-over appeal to mystery writers like deFord. Many of her science fiction stories first appeared in Boucher's magazine and dealt with themes like nuclear devastation, alienation, and changing sexual roles. Her two collections are Elsewhere, Elsewhen, Elsehow and Xenogenesis. She edited an anthology of stories mixing science fiction with mystery called Space, Time, and Crime.

DeFord was also a passionate Fortean, and carried out fieldwork for Charles Fort; she is mentioned in his book Lo! Shortly before her death in 1975, Fortean writer Loren Coleman visited deFord and interviewed her about her earlier interactions with Fort and her trips to Chico, California, to investigate the case of a poltergeist rock-thrower on Fort's behalf.

She worked for Humanist magazine and she was one of the signatories of the Humanist Manifesto.

== Death ==
DeFord died February 22, 1975, aged 86, at her longtime home, the Ambassador Hotel at 55 Mason Street in San Francisco.

== Posthumous ==
In 2008, The Library of America selected deFord's story of the Leopold and Loeb trial for inclusion in its two-century retrospective of American True Crime.

== Marriages ==
DeFord's first marriage was to Armistead Collier in 1915. The couple divorced in 1920. She was married to Maynard Shipley from 1921 until his death in June 1934.

== Bibliography ==
=== Anthologies ===
Science Fiction:

- Xenogenesis (1969)
- Elsewhere, Elsewhen, Elsehow (1971)

Mystery:

- The Theme is Murder (1967)
- La Maison fantastique (1988)

=== Anthologies containing stories by Miriam Allen deFord ===
- The Lyrics West, Volume 1 (1921)
- The Queen's Awards: Series 4 - prize-winning detective stories from EQMM (1949)
- Star Science Fiction Stories, No. 4 (1958)
- Star Science Fiction Stories, No. 6 (1959)
- The Lethal Sex: The 1959 Anthology of the Mystery Writers of America (1959)
- Tales for a Rainy Night: 14th Mystery Writers of America Anthology (1961)
- The Fifth Galaxy Reader (1962)
- The Quality of Murder: 300 Years of True Crime (1962)
- Rogue Dragon (1965)
- Alfred Hitchcock's Monster Museum: Twelve Shuddery Stories for Daring Young Readers (1965)
- Best Detective Stories of the Year: 20th Annual Collection (1965)
- Alfred Hitchcock Presents: Stories Not For the Nervous (1965)
- Dangerous Visions (1967)
- Gentle Invaders (1969)
- Crime Prevention in the 30th Century (1969)
- Boucher's Choicest : A Collection of Anthony Boucher's Favorites from Best Detective Stories of the Year (1969)
- With Malice Toward All (1970)
- Worlds of Maybe: 7 Stories of Science Fiction (1970)
- 15 Science Fiction Stories - a subset of Dangerous Visions reprinted in German (1970)
- Alfred Hitchcock Presents: Scream Along With Me (1970)
- New Dimensions 2: Eleven Original Science Fiction Stories (1972)
- Two Views of Wonder (1973)
- The Alien Condition (1973)
- Alfred Hitchcock Presents: More Stories Not For the Nervous (1973)
- Alfred Hitchcock Presents: Stories to be Read With the Lights On (1973)
- Omega (1974)
- Strange Bedfellows (1974)
- The Venus Factor (1977)
- Terrors, Torments and Traumas (reprint, 1978)
- Nature's Revenge: Eerie Stories of Revolt Against the Human Race (1978)
- Spirits, Spooks and Other Sinister Creatures (reprint, 1984)
- Killer Couples: Terrifying True Stories of the World's Deadliest Duos (1987)
- Trois saigneurs de la nuit - (Vol. 3, 1988)
- The Lady Killers: Famous Women Murderers (1990)
- New Eves: Science Fiction About the Extraordinary Women of Today and Tomorrow (1994)
- Women Resurrected: Stories from Women Science Fiction Writers of the 50s (2011)
- Troubled Daughters, Twisted Wives: Stories from the Trailblazers of Domestic Suspense (2013)

=== Magazines containing stories by Miriam Allen deFord ===
- Alfred Hitchcock Mystery Magazine (March, 1971)
- Amazing Stories (January, 1962; March, 1972)
- Analog (December, 1972; December, 1974)
- The Best Science Fiction from The World of Tomorrow (No. 2, 1964)
- Bestseller Mystery Magazine (November, 1958; July, 1959)
- Beyond Fantasy Fiction (March, 1954)
- The Dude (November, 1961)
- Ellery Queen's Mystery Magazine (November, 1946; March, 1947; May, 1948; November, 1950; October, 1952; August, 1953; May, 1954; December, 1956; October, 1957; December, 1958; March, 1963; July, 1964; October, 1964; March, 1965; March, 1966; May, 1966; November, 1966; July, 1967; September, 1968; May, 1972; August, 1972; May, 1973; August, 1973; November, 1973; February, 1975)
- Famous Science Fiction (Vol. 2, No. 2, [whole number 8], Fall, 1968)
- Fantastic (January, 1961)
- Fantasy & Science Fiction (Vol. 31., No. 6, December 1966)
- Fiction - French magazine (No. 148, Mars, 1966)
- Galaxy Science Fiction (No. 75, 3/6 [March, 1952]; March, 1955; April, 1958; December, 1961; October, 1964; August, 1967; November, 1968)
- Gamma (Vol. 2, No.1, 1964)
- The Girl from U.N.C.L.E. (December, 1966)
- The Haldeman-Julius Monthly (January, 1927)
- If: Worlds of Science Fiction (November, 1959; October, 1965; February, 1966)
- Magazine of Fantasy and Science Fiction (August, 1951; October, 1952; January, 1954; August, 1954; May, 1955; February, 1956; May, 1956; November, 1956; December, 1956; June, 1958; December, 1958; May, 1959; March, 1960; July, 1960; December, 1960; June, 1962; April, 1963; September, 1964; February, 1965; July, 1965; February, 1966; March, 1966; May, 1966; December, 1966; March, 1968; April, 1968; October, 1969; November, 1969; March, 1970; October, 1970; January, 1972; May, 1973)
- Mercury Mystery Magazine (April, 1958; February, 1959)
- Mike Shayne Mystery Magazine (October, 1972)
- Modern Age: A Quarterly Review (Vol. 11, 1966–67)
- Prairie Schooner (Summer 1949, Volume XXIII)
- The Realist (No. 41, June, 1963)
- The Saint Mystery Magazine (May1961;May, 1963; January, 1965; December, 1965; August, 1966; May, 1967; August, 1967)
- The Saturday Review of Literature (July 25, 1942)
- SFWA Forum No. 33 - Science Fiction Writers of America (April, 1974)
- Science Fiction Yearbook (No. 2, 1968)
- Scribner's Magazine (Vol. 94, No. 5, Nov. 1933)
- Shock Magazine (July, 1960)
- Space Stories (October, 1952)
- Startling Stories (July, 1952; October, 1952; December, 1952; Summer, 1955)
- True Crime Detective Magazine (Winter, 1953)
- Venture Science Fiction (November, 1957; October, 1965)
- Worlds of Tomorrow (Vol. 1, No. 1, April, 1963; Vol. 2, No. 1, April, 1964)

=== Fact Crime/True Crime ===
- The Overbury Affair (1960)
- The Real Bonnie and Clyde (1968)
- The Real Ma Barker (1970)

=== Little Blue Book Series ===
- Little Blue Book No. 197: What Great Frenchwomen Learned About Love (1926)
- Little Blue Book No. 832: The Life and Poems of Catullus (1925)
- Little Blue Book No. 867: Cicero As Revealed in His Letters (1925)
- Little Blue Book No. 895: Astronomy for Beginners (1927)
- Little Blue Book No. 896: The Augustan Poets of Rome (1925) (editor)
- Little Blue Book No. 899: Rome As Viewed by Tacitus and Juvenal (1925)
- Little Blue Book No. 999: Latin Self-Taught (1926) (editor)
- Little Blue Book No. 1009: Typewriting Self-Taught (1926)
- Little Blue Book No. 1087: The Facts About Fascism (1926)
- Little Blue Book No. 1088: The Truth About Mussolini (1926)
- Little Blue Book No. 1174: How To Write Business Letters (1927)
- Little Blue Book No. 1847: The Meaning of All Common Given Names (1947)

=== Other ===
Author

- Love-Children: A Book of Illustrious Illegitimates (1931)
- Facts You Should Know About California (1941)
- California (1946)
- They Were San Franciscans (1947)
- Psychologist unretired: the life pattern of Lillien J. Martin (1948)
- Up-Hill All The Way: The Life of Maynard Shipley (1956)
- Stone Walls: Prisons from Fetters to Furloughs (1962)
- Penultimates (1962)
- Murderers Sane and Mad: Case Histories in the Motivation and Rationale of Murder (1965)
- Thomas Moore - Twayne's English Authors Series (1967)

Editor

- Space, Time and Crime (1964) - anthology of science fiction

== Sources ==
- Index to Female Writers In Science Fiction, Fantasy & Utopia
- Domestic Suspense: Celebrating An Overlooked Generation of Female Suspense Writers
- Fantastic Fiction database: Miriam Allen deFord
- Site describing the French language anthology
