= Monadnock Building (San Francisco) =

Building in San Francisco, California

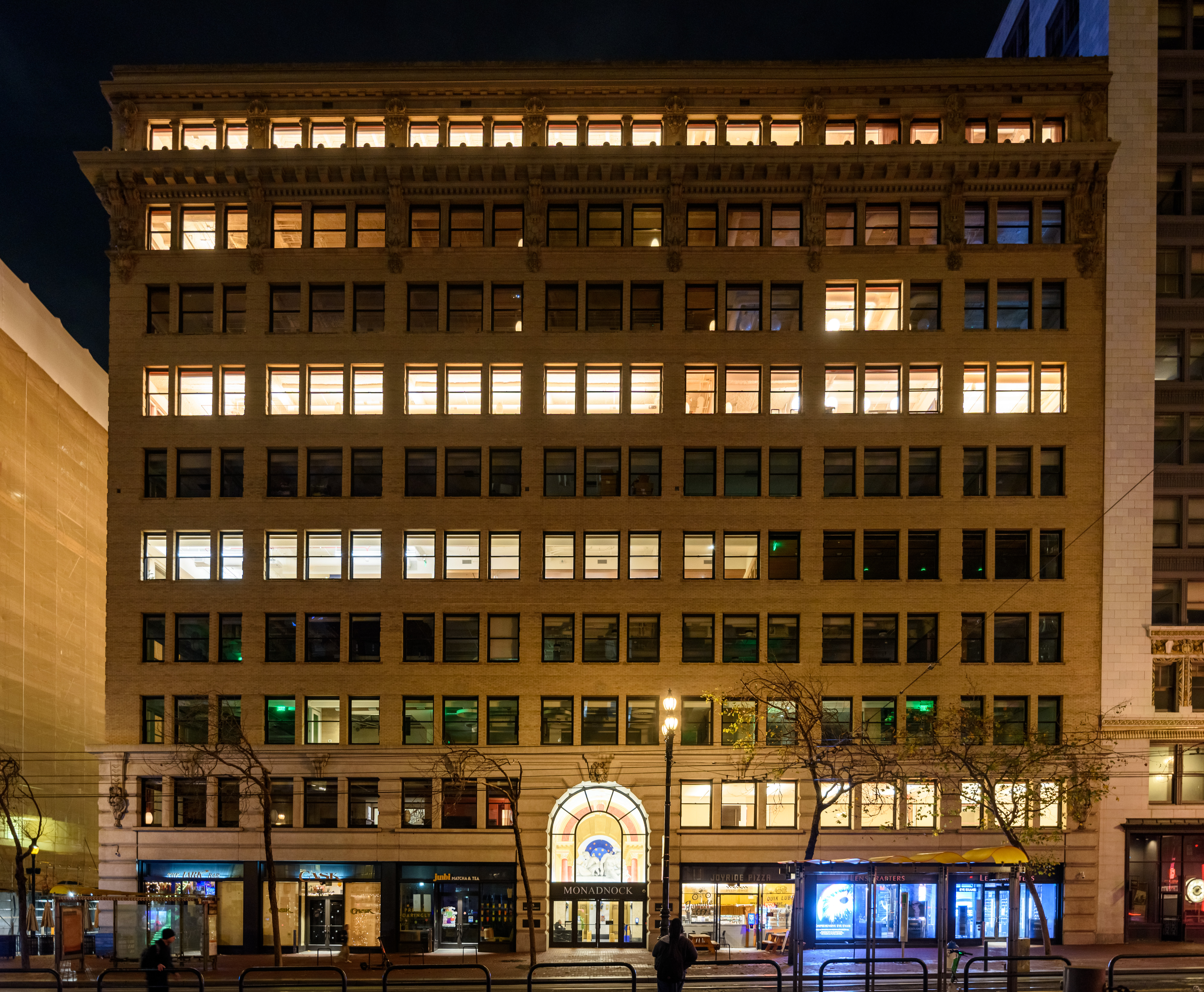
- Market St. facade of the Monadnock Building.
- Interactive map of Monadnock Building (San Francisco)

General information
- Coordinates: 37.78775791990537°N 122.40285119552361°W
- Completed: 1907

The Monadnock Building is a historic 10-story, 204,625-square-foot (19,010.3 m^{2}) office building at 685 Market Street in downtown San Francisco, California. The building was designed by the firm of Frederick H. Meyer and Smith, and completed in 1907, immediately following the 1906 San Francisco earthquake. The building stands immediately adjacent to both the BART Montgomery Street Station and the Palace Hotel, and across Market Street from Lotta's Fountain.

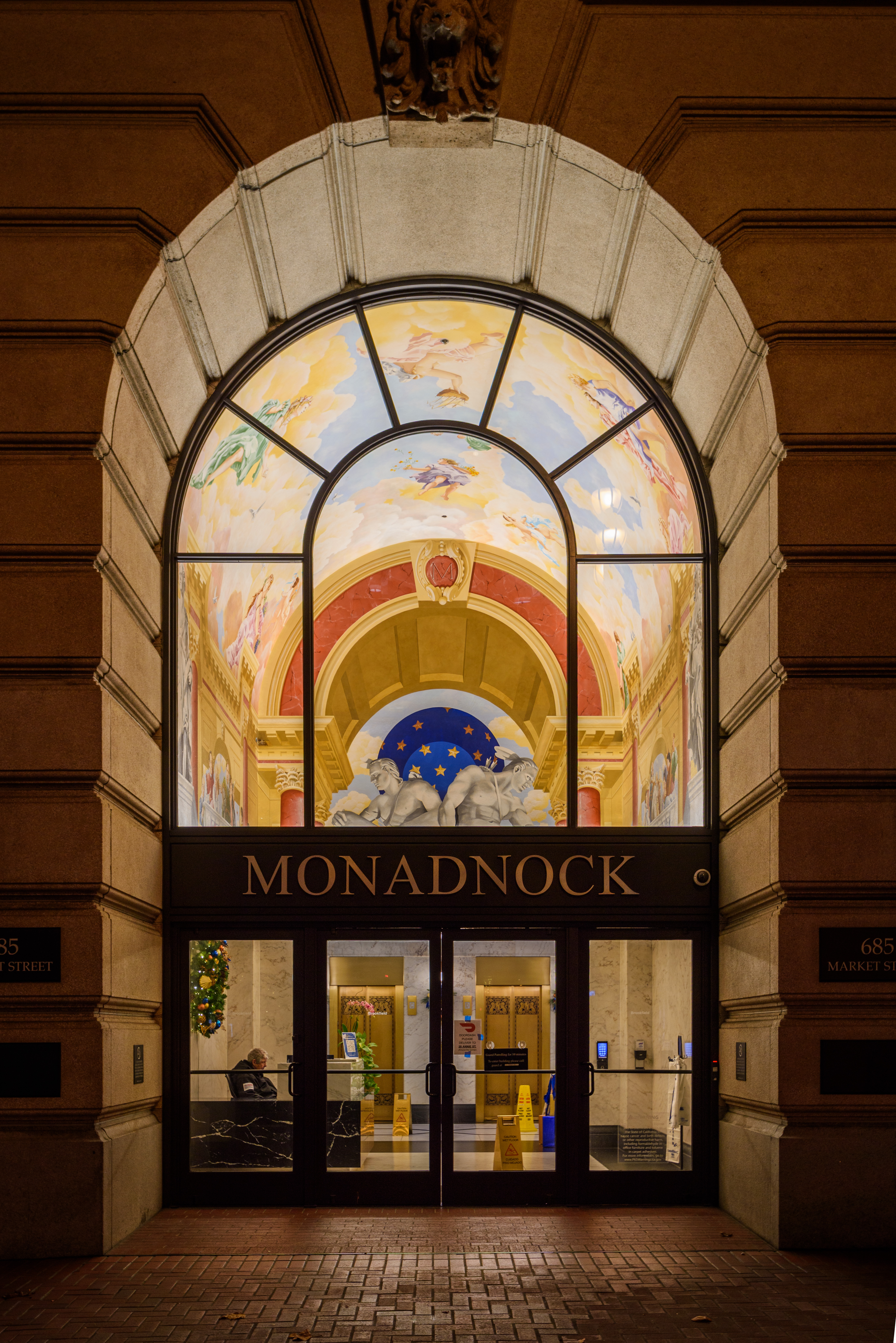
The building's entrance, with the lobby ceiling mural visible.

The Monadnock Building is an example of the turn-of-the-century Beaux Arts style. The building was extensively renovated in 1986, and again in 2016. Macys.com is a major tenant and Uber became a major tenant in 2014. The technology firm Notion leased space in the Monadnock Building in 2024 and subsequently indicated that it would take over the entire building.
