= Cadillac Hotel (San Francisco) =

Historic building in California, US

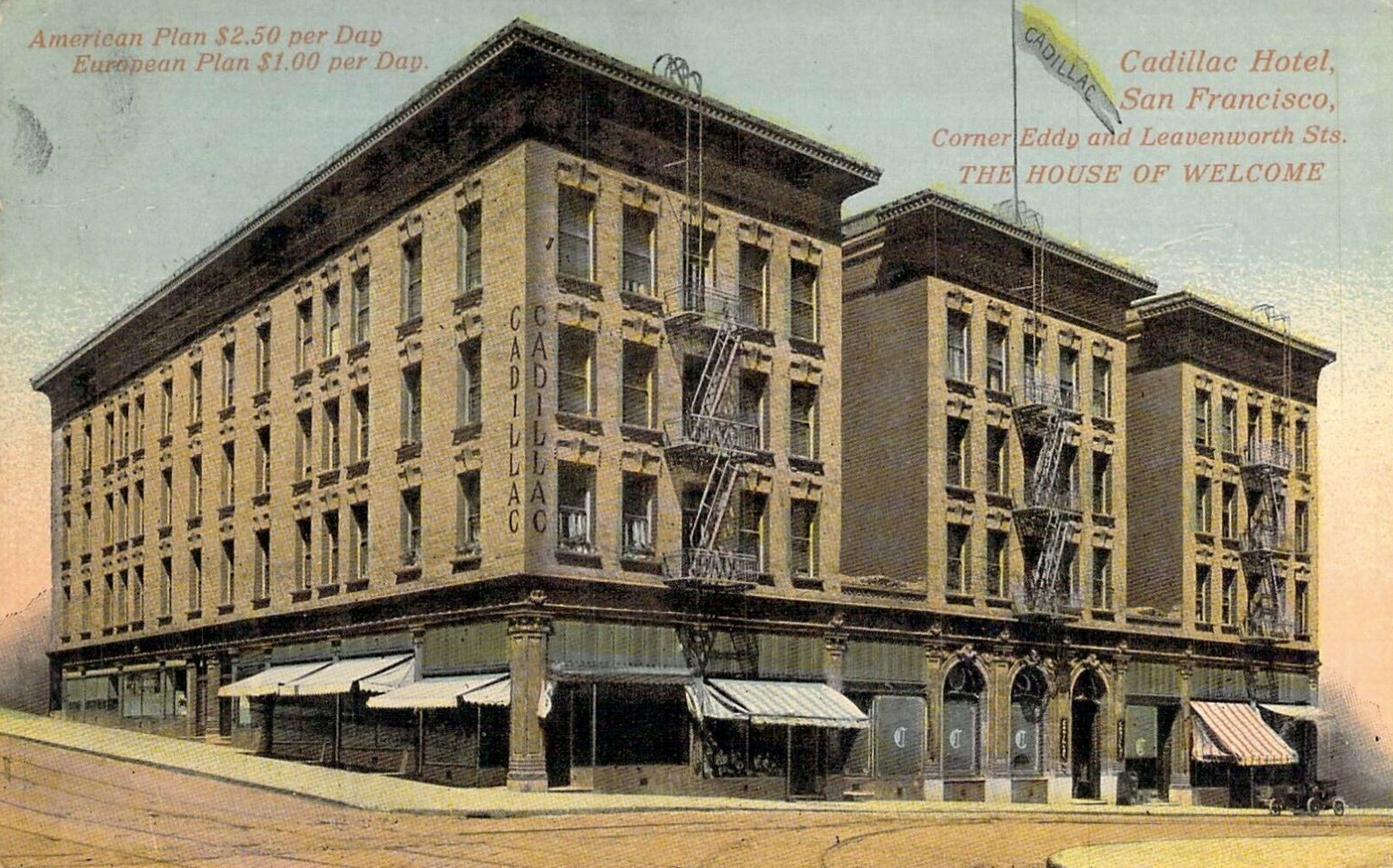
- image from ca. 1913

- Location within San Francisco County Location within California
- 37.783867°N 122.413917°W
- Location: 366–394 Eddy Street, San Francisco, California, U.S.

History
- Built: c. 1907 – c. 1908
- Built for: Andrew A. Louderback

Site notes
- Architect(s): Meyer and O'Brien

San Francisco Designated Landmark
- Designated: January 6, 1985
- Reference no.: 176

The Cadillac Hotel is a historic building from c. 1907 – c. 1908 in the Tenderloin neighborhood of San Francisco, California, U.S.. It was the first non-profit single-residence occupancy (SRO) hotel in the Western United States. Since 2015, the first two floors of the building is the home to the Tenderloin Museum, a cultural history museum dedicated to the neighborhood. It was called the A.A. Louderback Building, and nicknamed "The House of Welcome" during the early 20th-century.

The Cadillac Hotel has been listed as a San Francisco Designated Landmark since 1985; and is part of the NRHP-listed Uptown Tenderloin Historic District since 2009. The building also has a historical marker, erected by Uptown Tenderloin, Inc.

== History ==
The Cadillac Hotel was designed by architectural firm, Meyer and O'Brien (Frederick Herman Meyer and Michael Smith O'Brien) as a hotel for client Andrew A. Louderback (1831–1926). It is a four-story steel beam building with reinforced brick, with a three-part design in a Renaissance Revival/Baroque Revival architectural style with the influence of Art Nouveau. In the early 19th-century, the building had 180 guest rooms, a ballroom, and the first floor had many retail stores. It was built right after the 1906 San Francisco earthquake and fire. It pre-dated the majority of the residential building in the Tenderloin neighborhood, which occurred years later around the opening of the Panama–Pacific International Exposition of 1915.

From 1924 until 1992, the Cadillac Hotel housed the Newman's Gym, founded by Billy Newman. It was noted for being one of the oldest boxing facility in the country, and the practice space for Muhammad Ali, Joe Louis, Jack Dempsey, George Foreman, and Sugar Ray Robinson.

In the 1960s, businessman Donald Fisher owned the building, and stripped away many of the historical details from the architecture.

In the 1970s and 1980s, single-residence occupancy (SRO) and tenant rights activism grew, along with a desire to preserve the Tenderloin. Community activist Leroy Looper and Reality House West purchased the building in 1979, with the goal of creating housing for the homeless. Lopper rehabilitated the Cadillac Hotel building through the help of various grants, and housed some 160 tenants.

In 2015, Tenderloin Museum (formerly Tenderloin History Museum) moved into the ground floor of the building. The Cadillac operates as a "shelter plus care hotel" in modern-day. In 2023, the building made the news with the elevator breaking many times a year, and trapping vulnerable residents.

== See also ==
- African Americans in San Francisco
- List of San Francisco Designated Landmarks
