= Hotel Union =

Hotel in San Francisco, California

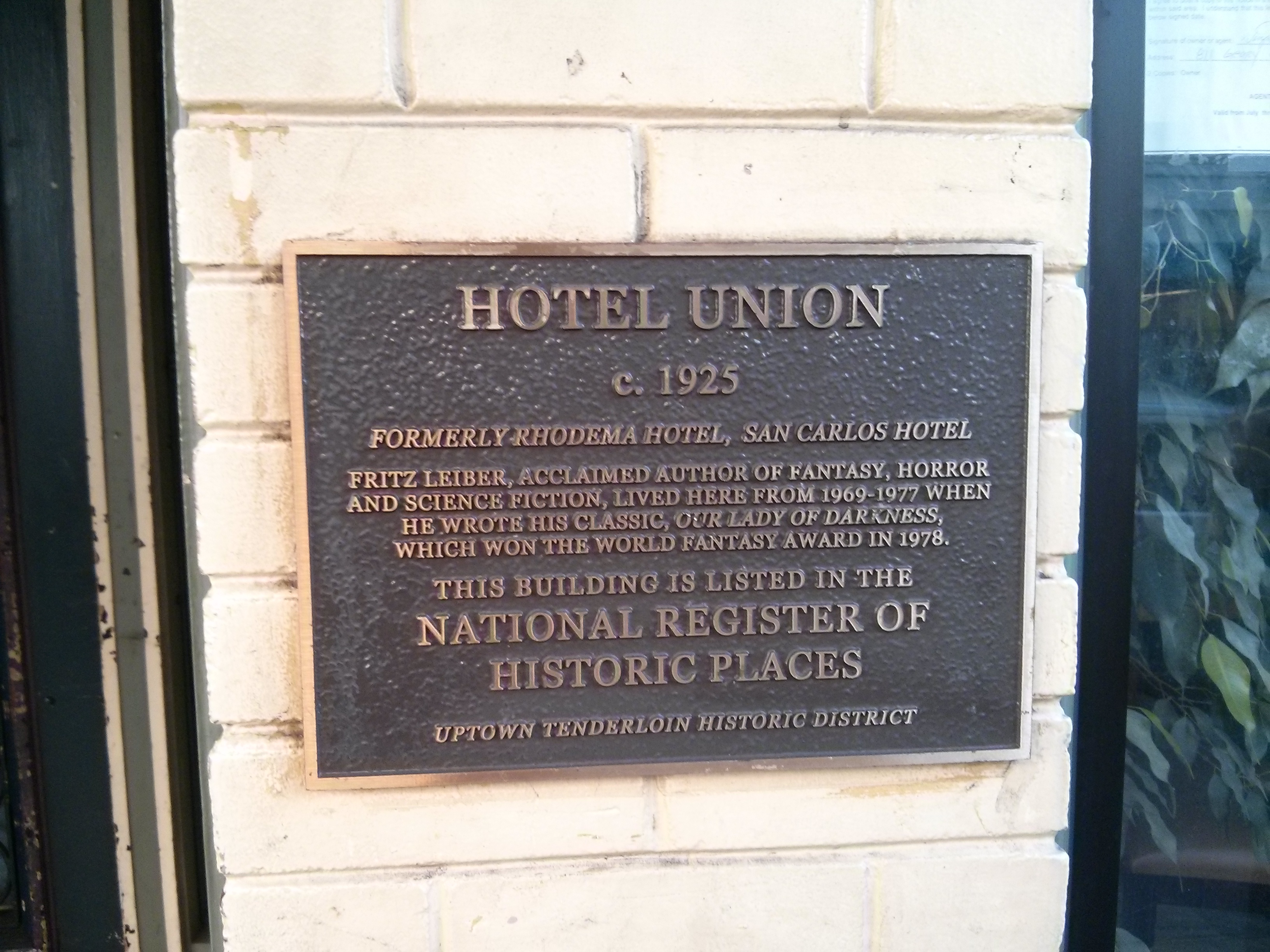
Plaque at the Hotel Union, indicating the building's inclusion in the National Register of Historic Places.

The Hotel Union, formerly the Rhodema Hotel and the San Carlos Hotel, at 811 Geary Street in the Tenderloin neighborhood of San Francisco, California.

The building is a contributing building in the Uptown Tenderloin Historic District which is listed in the National Register of Historic Places. The building is most notable for being the home of American author Fritz Leiber from 1969 to 1977, and was a prominent setting in his novel Our Lady of Darkness (1977).
