= The Alien Condition =

First edition, cover by Mati Klarwein.

The Alien Condition is an anthology of science fiction short stories edited by American writer Stephen Goldin and published in 1973 by Ballantine Books.

== Stories ==
- "Lament of the Keeku Bird" by Kathleen Sky
- "Wings" by Vonda N. McIntyre
- "The Empire of T'ang Lang" by Alan Dean Foster
- "A Way Out" by Miriam Allen deFord
- "Gee, Isn't He the Cutest Little Thing?" by Arthur Byron Cover
- "Deaf Listener" by Rachel Cosgrove Payes
- "Nor Iron Bars a Cage" by C.F. Hensel and Stephen Goldin
- "Routine Patrol Activity" by Thomas Pickens
- "Call from Kerlyana" by Alice Laurance and William K. Carlson
- "The Safety Engineer" by William E. Cochrane, writing as S. Kye Boult
- "Love Is the Plan the Plan Is Death" by James Tiptree Jr.
- "The Latest from Sigma Corvi" by Edward Wellen
