= Hotel Carlton =

Historic hotel in San Francisco, California

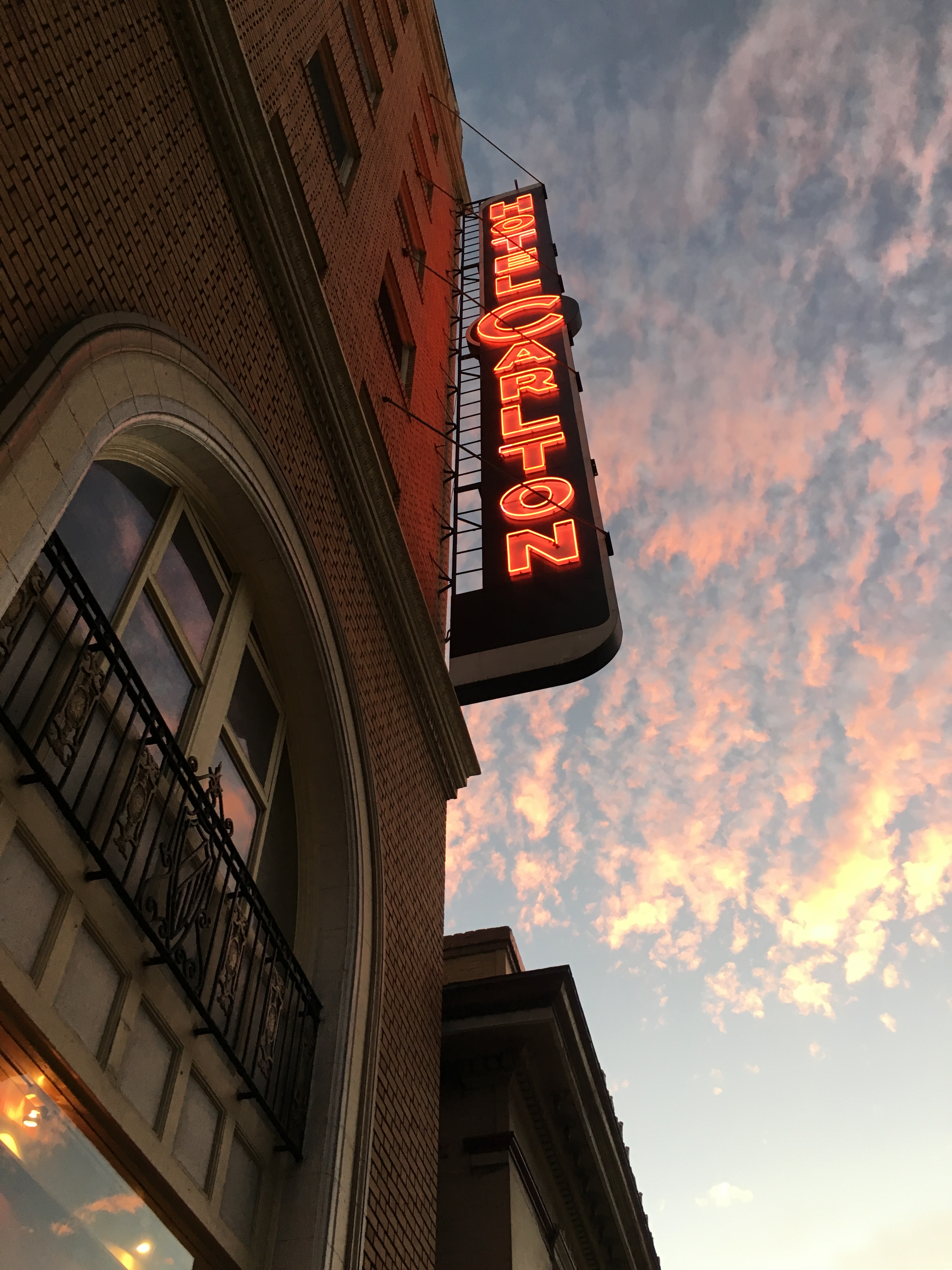
- Interactive map of the Hotel Carlton area

General information
- Location: 1075 Sutter Street, San Francisco, California 94109
- Owner: Richard C. Blum, Dianne Feinstein
- Hotel Carlton
- U.S. Historic district – Contributing property
- Location within San Francisco County Location within California Location within the United States
- Coordinates: 37.7877°N 122.4180°W
- Built: 1927
- Architect: Mel I. Schwartz
- Part of: Lower Nob Hill Apartment Hotel District (ID91000957)
- Designated CP: July 31, 1991

Hotel Carlton is a boutique hotel on Nob Hill in San Francisco which has been operating since 1927. It is operated by Joie de Vivre Hospitality.

It is a contributing property to the Lower Nob Hill Apartment Hotel District, which was listed on the National Register of Historic Places in 1991.

It is particularly known for the significant ownership interest which, as of 2015, California Senator Dianne Feinstein and husband Richard C. Blum hold in it.

The Hotel Carlton was the permanent place of residence of the character Paladin, the lead character in the TV Western "Have Gun - Will Travel."
