= Helène Aylon =

American multimedia and eco-feminist artist (1931–2020)

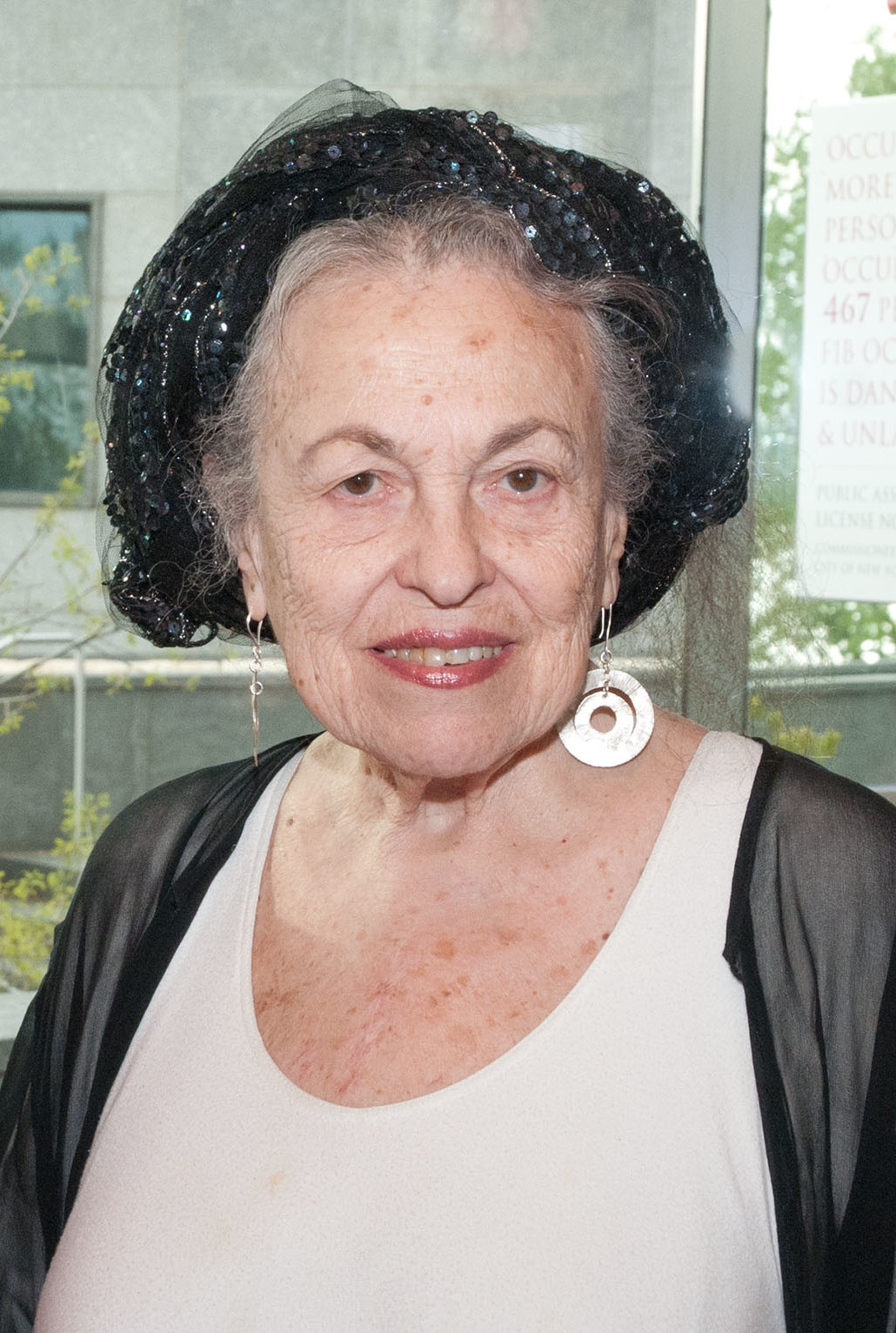
- Aylon in 2014
- Born: Helene Greenfield; February 4, 1931; Brooklyn, New York, U.S.
- Died: April 6, 2020 (aged 89); New York City, New York, U.S.
- Education: Brooklyn College, Art Students League of New York, Brooklyn Museum Art School, Antioch College/West
- Known for: Painting, installation art, multimedia art

Helène Aylon (née Greenfield; February 4, 1931 – April 6, 2020), was an American multimedia, eco-feminist artist, and educator. Her work can be divided into three phases: process art (1970s), anti-nuclear art (1980s), and The G-d Project (1990s and early 2000s), a feminist commentary on the Hebrew Bible and other established traditions. In 2012, Aylon published, Whatever Is Contained Must Be Released: My Jewish Orthodox Girlhood, My Life as a Feminist Artist. She died during the COVID-19 pandemic, due to complications brought on by COVID-19.

== Early life and education ==
Aylon was born and raised in Borough Park, Brooklyn, New York City. While living there, she received an Orthodox Jewish upbringing; she was fluent in Hebrew. She attended grade school at Shulamith School for Girls and her high school education was at the Midrasha; Aylon, however, originally wanted to attend The High School of Music and Art in Manhattan. While attending high school, she became engaged to a rabbinical student named Mandel H. Fisch (b. 1926); they married in 1949. Aylon moved immediately to Montréal, where her husband served as a rabbi. After two years, she gave birth to a son, Nathaniel Fisch, followed by a daughter, Renee Emunah. The couple returned to Brooklyn while Aylon was pregnant with her second child. Mandel Fisch was diagnosed with cancer in 1956 and died five years later; Aylon was 30.

Prior to her husband's death, Aylon enrolled as an art student at Brooklyn College, where she studied under Ad Reinhardt. She graduated with a B.A. degree from Brooklyn College in 1960. She studied at the Art Students League of New York in 1961; and the Brooklyn Museum Art School in 1962.

After finishing college, she was commissioned to paint a mural for the youth employment center in the Brooklyn neighborhood of Bedford-Stuyvesant. When photographed for a newspaper article, she said that her name was Helène Aylon, in which she used the Hebrew equivalent of her first name as her surname.

Aylon's first notable work, Rauch (Spirit, Wind, Breath) (1965), was a 16-foot mural, commissioned for the now-defunct Synagogue Library at JFK International Airport, that attempted to portray Judaism through the eyes of women.

== Teaching and feminism ==
She subsequently taught at San Francisco State University, and the California College of Arts and Crafts in Oakland. In 1980, Aylon received a M.A. degree in women's studies from Antioch College/West.

== Process art ==
Aylon's earliest exploration of process art was done in California in the 1970s. She created a series called Paintings That Change (1974–77), which included Tar Pouring, Drifting Boundaries, Receding Beige, and Oval on Left Edge. All of the works consisted of oil on paper which would slowly transform as the oil moved, relying on chance. In 1978, she began work on a series called The Breakings, for which she poured linseed oil on large panels that she placed flat on the studio floor and allowed the oil to form a thick skin. Next, she tilted the panels so that gravity would cause the oil to form a sac underneath the surface, which was subsequently allowed to break, again dependent largely on chance. As a result, the work looked completely different than it originally appeared. Aylon described this work as "very wet, orgasmic process art." In 1970 and 1972, Aylon showed at the Max Hutchinson Gallery in SoHo; in 1975 and 1979, her Paintings that Change in Time were exhibited at Betty Parsons Gallery, Susan Caldwell Gallery, MIT, and the Oakland Museum.

== Anti-nuclear and eco-activist art ==
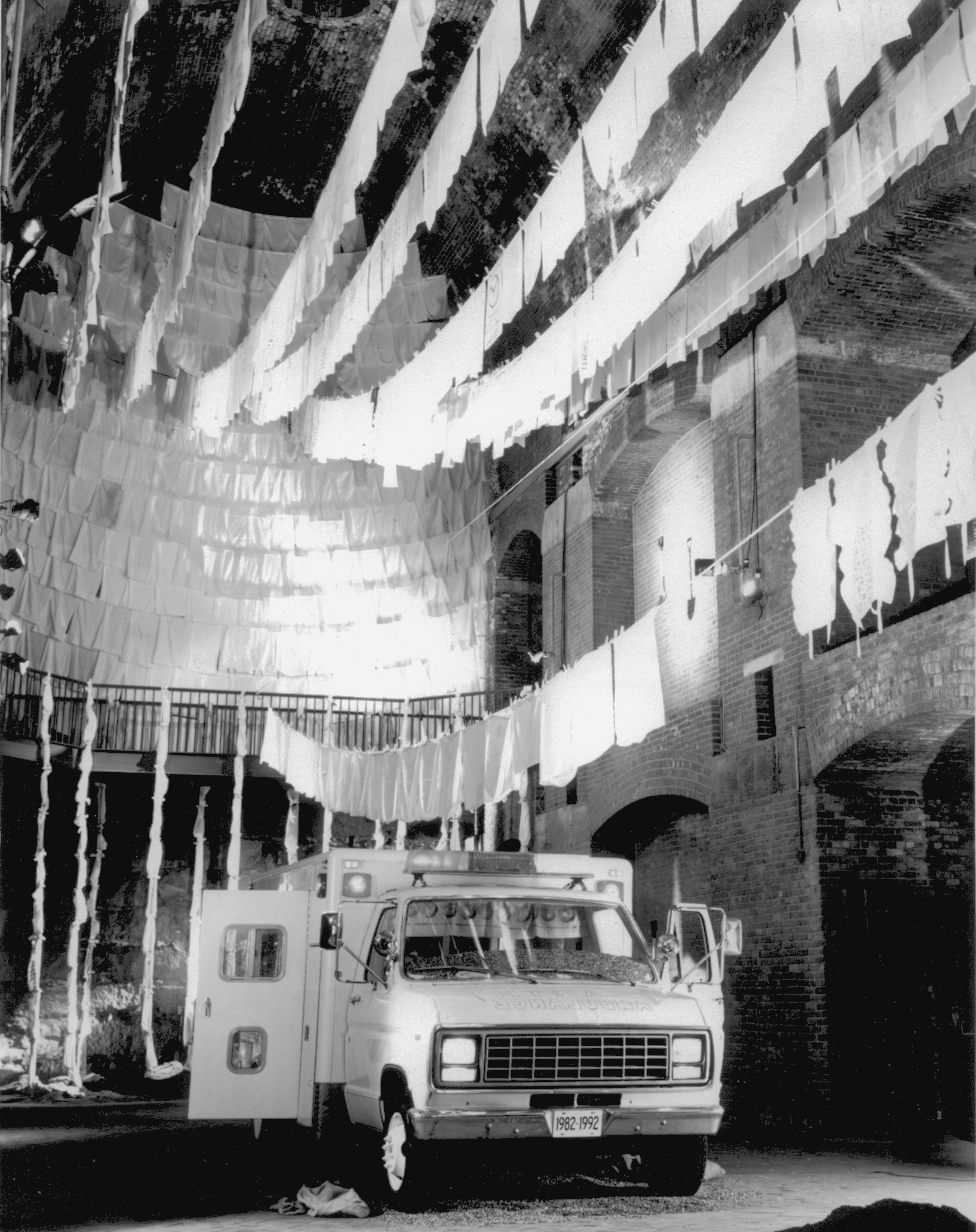
Earth Ambulance

By the 1980s, Aylon, was a self-described eco-feminist. She began to create anti-nuclear and eco-activist art, which included Earth Ambulance. This work consisted of an "ambulance" (a converted U-Haul van) that symbolized an attempt to save the world from nuclear war. Using the Earth Ambulance, Aylon gathered dirt from Strategic Air Command nuclear bases, uranium mines, and nuclear reactors from across the United States. She stuffed the dirt into pillowcases and used them in a demonstration at the United Nations during the Second Special Session on Nuclear Disarmament on June 12, 1982. In front of a group of spectators, the pillowcases were carried down the steps of Ralph Bunche Park on army stretchers. In 1992, to celebrate the end of the Cold War, she installed a seed-filled ambulance at the Brooklyn Bridge Anchorage, an alternative space in New York City. Pillowcases from previous projects were hung around the installation. For her later Bridge of Knots, Aylon created chains of knotted pillowcases, inscribed with dreams and nightmares about nuclear war, which were draped around the façades of the Knoxville Museum of Art in 1993, Berkeley Art Museum in 1995, and American University Museum in 2006.

In 1985, Aylon traveled to Japan to mark the 40th anniversary of the atomic bombing of Hiroshima and Nagasaki. Floating sacks of seeds, grain, pods, and bamboo were sent down the rivers towards those two cities. In 1995, Aylon's video of the "two sacs en route" to Hiroshima and Nagasaki was shown on the Sony Jumbotron in Times Square.

== The G-d Project ==
After the death of Aylon's husband in 1961, she began to develop an idea of reformed Judaism which rejected the patriarchal notions in the Five Books of Moses. In the 1990s, Aylon began work on The G-d Project, a nine-part project that spanned two decades. The first work in the project, The Liberation of G-d, contains the five books of Moses, in English and Hebrew, which sit on velvet-covered stands. Each page is covered in translucent parchment. The sound of turning parchment pages was recorded and played in a loop while the work was on exhibition. Aylon placed the 54 sections of the Torah on glass shelves along a wall, adjacent to the five books of Moses, and used a pink highlighter to mark phrases that, according to her, convey patriarchal attitudes. She also targeted words or phrases that conveyed a sense of vengeance, deception, cruelty, and misogyny that had been falsely attributed to God. The work was first exhibited in Too Jewish? Challenging Traditional Identities at the Armand Hammer Museum of Art in March 1996. During the exhibition, Aylon formally invited area rabbis to visit and discuss her work.

In 1997, she completed The Women's Section, the second work in The G-d Project, which is dedicated to women with the marital status of agunah: whose estranged husbands do not grant them a Jewish religious divorce called a Get, making it impossible for them to remarry. Included are texts from the Torah that speak of women's "impurity" and "virginity."

In 1998, Aylon created the third work in the series, My Notebooks, which consists of 54 blank 8.5 × 11″ notebooks that form a group of columns. The closed notebooks, with their dark covers, form black columns; the open notebooks form white columns. A transparency of Aylon's photographs from a Jewish girls' school is projected across the notebooks. The work is "Dedicated to Mrs. Rashi and to Mrs. Maimonides, for surely they have something to say" and was intended to be a statement on women's lack of scholarship and participation in education." It also alludes to the female teachers of Aylon's all-female school, who could only teach commentary from male rabbis.

In 1999, Aylon created Epilogue: Alone With My Mother, the fourth work in the series. This work features a seven-foot-wide alcove with a pew, facing a stand with two open Bibles fixed in a way that stops them from closing. In the Bibles the blessings and curses of the last chapters of Deuteronomy are highlighted. There is also a taped conversation between Aylon and her mother to accompany the installation, and the installation is dedicated to Aylon's mother.

In 1999, Aylon created My Bridal Chamber: My Marriage Contract, the fifth work in the series. It is a simple bed covered in a white bedspread that Aylon constructed from handkerchiefs and a wedding canopy. Around it are four columns with superimposed projections of photographs that show the artist in her wedding gown. Behind the headboard, Aylon wrote quotes from Leviticus concerning women's "uncleanliness" and "impurity." The work was meant to be a comment on marital and religious constraints felt by women.

Aylon also created My Bridal Chamber: My Marriage Bed/My Clean Days (2000 - 2001), the sixth work in the series. In this work, Aylon projected shifting images onto a white bedsheet to represent menstrual impurity, while a cascade of voice recordings counted the waiting times between periods and ritual baths.

In 2002, Aylon completed The Partition Is in Place, But the Service Can't Begin, the seventh work in the series. In this work there is a wall made of tzitzit and large photocopies of the Western Wall. The work is a comment on the segregation of male and female worshippers in the Orthodox synagogue and at the Western Wall. As noted by Aylon, "The material I thought appropriate for the Partition that separates male and female worshippers is made of the ritual garb worn by religious men. But if there were nine male worshippers and one thousand female worshippers, the service could not begin because the service requires the presence of ten men."

Aylon also created Wrestlers (1980, 2005), the eighth work in the series. It features large-scale landscape photographs with herself as a tiny figure in them, searching for foremothers. In 2005 she "added another layer of meaning to the Wrestlers by focusing on one particular wrestling fore-mother - Lot's Wife - and I gave her a name." That name was Hashemshela, which according to Aylon means "her name" in Hebrew. Aylon dedicated Wrestlers to Ana Mendieta.

The ninth and final work in Aylon's The G-d Project is All Rise (2007), an imagined feminist court where women who have been forbidden on a Beit Din, the Jewish court of law, can now judge. In the work a wooded platform with three steps holds three chairs with tzitzit dangling from them, flanked by two pink pillowcase-flags and three signs with pink dashes that read "In G-d We Trust." A petitioner's bench faces the bet din. "I petition the traditional bet din of three males to include women as judges," Aylon stated, adding, "I think of my work as a 'rescue' of the Earth and God and women—all stuck in patriarchal designations."

== Death ==
Aylon died of complications of COVID-19 on April 6, 2020, in New York City, at the age of 89. A year before her death, Aylon showed her early work at Leslie Tonkonow, her first major New York solo show since 1979.

== Public collections and recognition ==
Aylon's work is in the permanent collections of the Whitney Museum, Museum of Modern Art, San Francisco Museum of Modern Art, and the Jewish Museum. She was the recipient of grants from the National Endowment for the Arts, Pollock-Krasner Foundation, New York State Council for the Arts, and New York Foundation for the Arts.

== Awards ==
- 2016: Women's Caucus for Art Lifetime Achievement Award
