= Our Lady of Darkness =

Novel by Fritz Leiber

- Cover of the first edition, published by Berkley Books. Cover art by Richard M. Powers.
- Author: Fritz Leiber
- Language: English
- Publication date: 1977

Our Lady of Darkness (1977) is an urban fantasy novel by American author Fritz Leiber. The novel is distinguished for three elements: the heavily autobiographical elements in the story, the use of Jungian psychology that informs the narrative, and its detailed description of "megapolisomancy", a fictional occult science. It was originally published in shorter form as The Pale Brown Thing (Magazine of Fantasy and Science Fiction, January/February 1977).

== Plot ==
The story centers on Franz Westen, a recovering alcoholic and writer of weird tales, who lives in San Francisco.

The plot unfolds as Westen discovers an old journal belonging to Clark Ashton Smith, a real-life writer of fantasy, horror, and science fiction. In this journal, Smith discusses "paramentals", entities that feed off of human emotions and are drawn to urban environments. As Westen delves deeper, he learns about "megapolisomancy", a fictional occult science focused on harnessing the supernatural forces present in large cities.

Westen begins to experience bizarre and terrifying occurrences. He sees mysterious figures on nearby rooftops and encounters eerie phenomena, suggesting the presence of supernatural forces in the city. The novel's climax involves Westen's confrontation with these forces, symbolized by the entity "Our Lady of Darkness" – a powerful, ancient being connected to the history and fabric of San Francisco itself.

== Autobiographical elements ==
Multiple elements of Our Lady of Darkness were inspired by Leiber's life and experiences. Like the protagonist Franz Westen, Leiber was recovering from the emotional trauma of his wife's death which led to a period of alcohol abuse and living in near-destitution. Westen also shared Leiber's interest in amateur astronomy, and in finding methods to re-engage with the world around him. Several of the characters are thinly disguised versions of people active in Bay Area fantasy and SF fandom in the mid-1970s.

The novel is set in actual San Francisco locations, including Corona Heights and the Sutro Tower behind it, and prominently features the Transamerica Pyramid. The fictional protagonist lives at the address where Leiber lived, 811 Geary Street, now the Hotel Union. Fifty years after the book was published, fantasy fans can still take a walking tour of the city that includes all of the novel's main locations.

== Metafictional elements ==
Our Lady of Darkness mentions authors Jack London, Ambrose Bierce, George Sterling, Nora May French, Dashiell Hammett, Gertrude Atherton, and Clark Ashton Smith, who all lived part of their lives in San Francisco. The title is taken from Thomas De Quincey's Suspiria de Profundis (which is quoted as an epigraph), and references are also made to M. R. James's ghost stories, Dorothy Sayers's detective fiction, and the work of fantasy and horror writers such as H.P. Lovecraft and Arthur Machen. These allusions add an element of metafiction to the story, making it in part an examination and description of horror and the imagination.

Lieber even mentions himself in the novel, as his bookish protagonist, Franz Westen, compares Lovecraft's fiction to "Lieber's A Bit of the Dark World," that being the title of a novelette of his own that was first published in Fantastic Stories of Imagination in February, 1962. Both A Bit of the Dark World and Our Lady of Darkness also contain the same quotation from de Quincy's Suspiria de Profundis.

== Jungian elements ==
Adding to the metafictional elements of the story are Leiber's frequent references to Jung's descriptions of the Anima (female self) and the Shadow (hidden self). These are elements that existed in Leiber's work nearly since the start of his career in the late 1930s, according to Bruce Byfield's Witches of the Mind: A Critical Study of Fritz Leiber. The main difference in Our Lady of Darkness is that, unlike much of his earlier works, the references to these figures are explicit, rather than implied, and at times supported by direct quotations.

== The Pale Brown Thing ==
Our Lady of Darkness was originally serialised, in shorter form and with the title The Pale Brown Thing, over two issues of the Magazine of Fantasy and Science Fiction (January/February 1977). The story was featured on the cover of the January issue with a painting by Ron Walotsky.

Fritz Leiber maintained that the two texts "should be regarded as the same story told at different times".

The Pale Brown Thing was reissued by Swan River Press in 2016 as a limited edition hardback. The cover by Jason Zerrillo is an homage to Walotsky's original artwork for F&SF. The volume includes an introduction by Leiber's friend, the San Francisco poet Donald Sidney-Fryer, who was the basis for the character of Jaime Donaldus Byers. It also includes a reprint of an essay by John Howard, "Story-telling Wonder-questing, Mortal Me: The Transformation of The Pale Brown Thing into Our Lady of Darkness", which examines the differences between The Pale Brown Thing and its later, lengthier incarnation.

== Reception ==
Our Lady of Darkness won the 1978 World Fantasy Award for Best Novel.

Richard A. Lupoff praised Our Lady of Darkness as "one of the scariest, most original, and most damnably convincing fantasy notions I've ever come across".

== See also ==
- Kult, a role playing game with some similar ideas on the quirks of big cities
- Geomancy
