= YMCA Hotel (San Francisco) =

- U.S. National Register of Historic Places
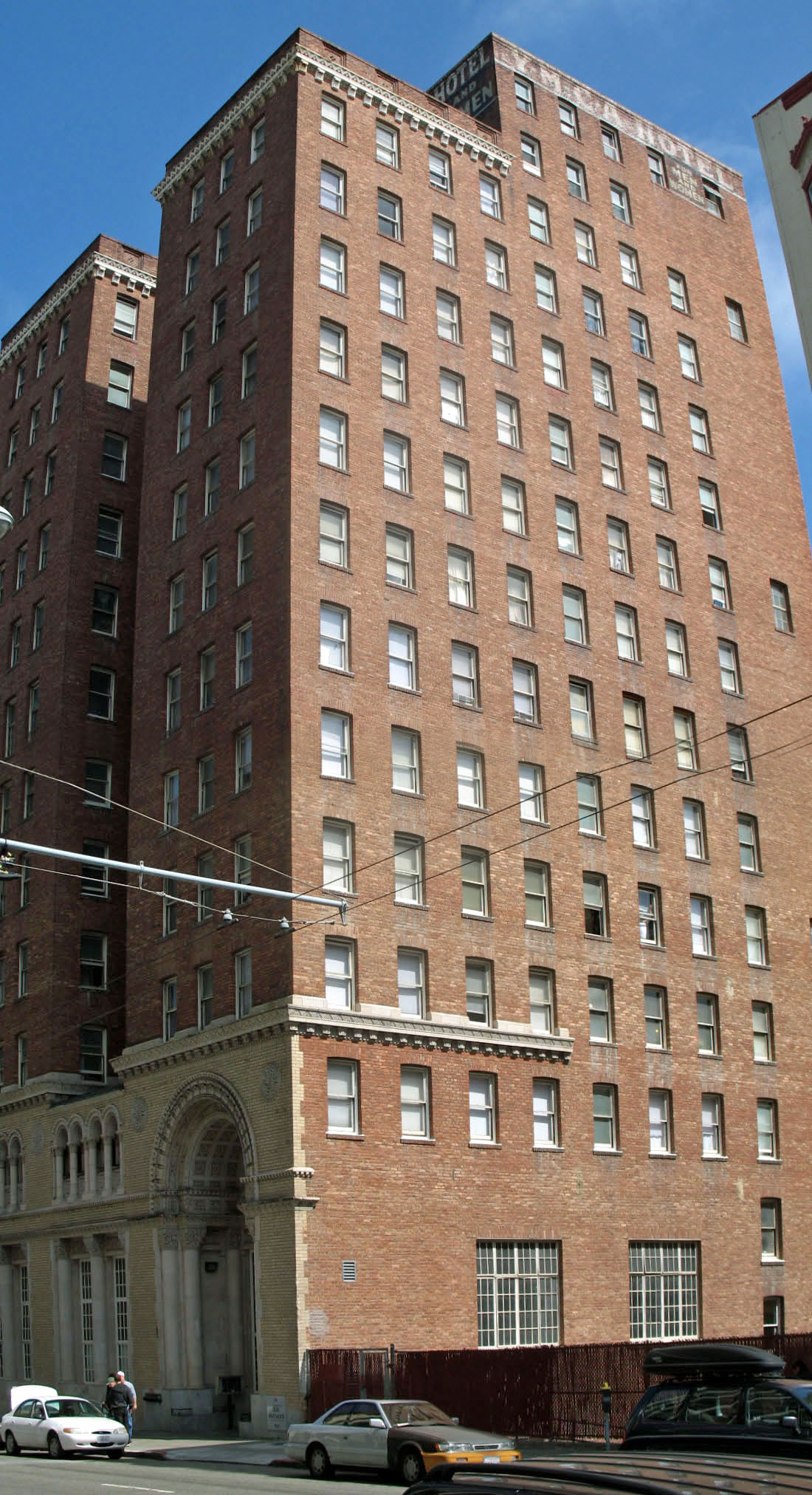

- Location within San Francisco County Location within California Location within the United States
- Location: 351 Turk Street, San Francisco, California
- Coordinates: 37°47′1″N 122°24′49″W
- Area: 0.4 acres (0.16 ha)
- Built: 1928
- Architect: Frederick Herman Meyer
- Architectural style: Chicago
- NRHP reference No.: 86000148
- Added to NRHP: February 6, 1986

The YMCA Hotel is a historic building in the Tenderloin District of San Francisco, California, United States. It is listed on the listed on the National Register of Historic Places in San Francisco, California since 1986; and it is a contributing property to the National Register of Historic Places's Uptown Tenderloin Historic District since 2009.

== History ==
At the time it was inducted into the National Register of Historic Places, it was colloquially referred to as the Whitehall Apartments. The building was designed by architect Frederick Herman Meyer.
