= Frederick Herman Meyer =

American architect

Frederick Herman Meyer (June 26, 1876 – March 6, 1961) was an American architect who was born in San Francisco. He was active in the San Francisco Bay Area, and is known for designing the YMCA Hotel in San Francisco. From c.1898 until 1901, Samuel Newsom worked with Meyer, to form the firm Newsom and Meyer in Oakland. Starting in 1902 and until 1908, Meyer entered into a partnership with architect Smith O'Brien to form the form Meyer and O'Brien.

Frederick Herman Meyer was born on Telegraph Hill, San Francisco, his father John Nicholas Meyer was a German immigrant, cabinet maker.

Meyer's papers are held at the College of Environmental Design Archives at the University of California, Berkeley.

== Buildings ==
- Cadillac Hotel (1908), Tenderloin, San Francisco, California; designed by Meyer and O'Brien, a San Francisco Historic Landmark, and part of the Uptown Tenderloin Historic District
- California Hall (formerly Das Deutsches Haus; 1912), San Francisco, California; which is listed as a San Francisco Designated Landmark
- The Belgravia (1913), San Francisco, California
- Exposition Auditorium (now known as the Bill Graham Civic Auditorium; 1915), San Francisco, California
- Green's Eye Hospital (1928), 1801 Bush Street, San Francisco, California
- Monadnock Building (1907), San Francisco, California
- Building 101 Built for Bethlehem Steel (1917), at Pier 70, San Francisco, California (now RH Furniture and Restaurant)
- YMCA Hotel (1928), San Francisco, California; which is listed in the National Register of Historic Places
