= Ambassador Hotel (San Francisco) =

Historic hotel in San Francisco's Tenderloin district

Coordinates: 37.784108°N 122.409359°W

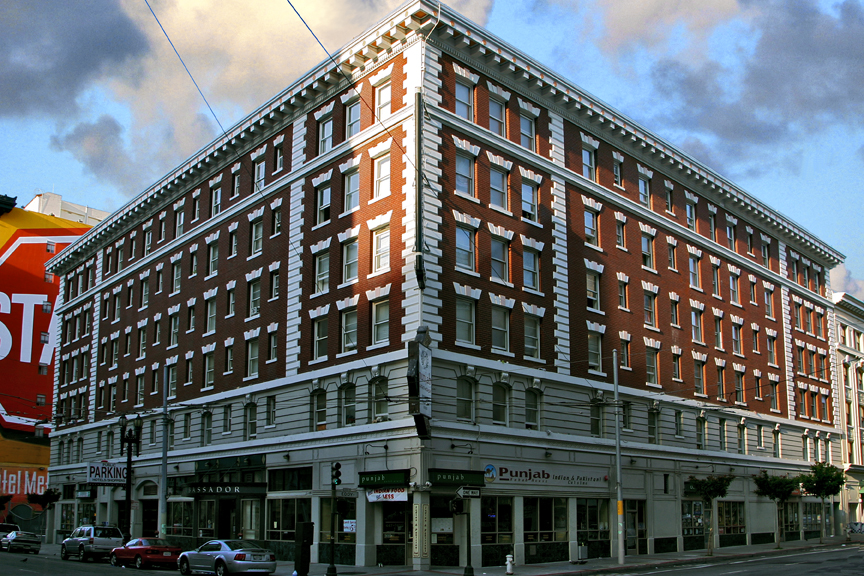
Ambassador Hotel in 2006

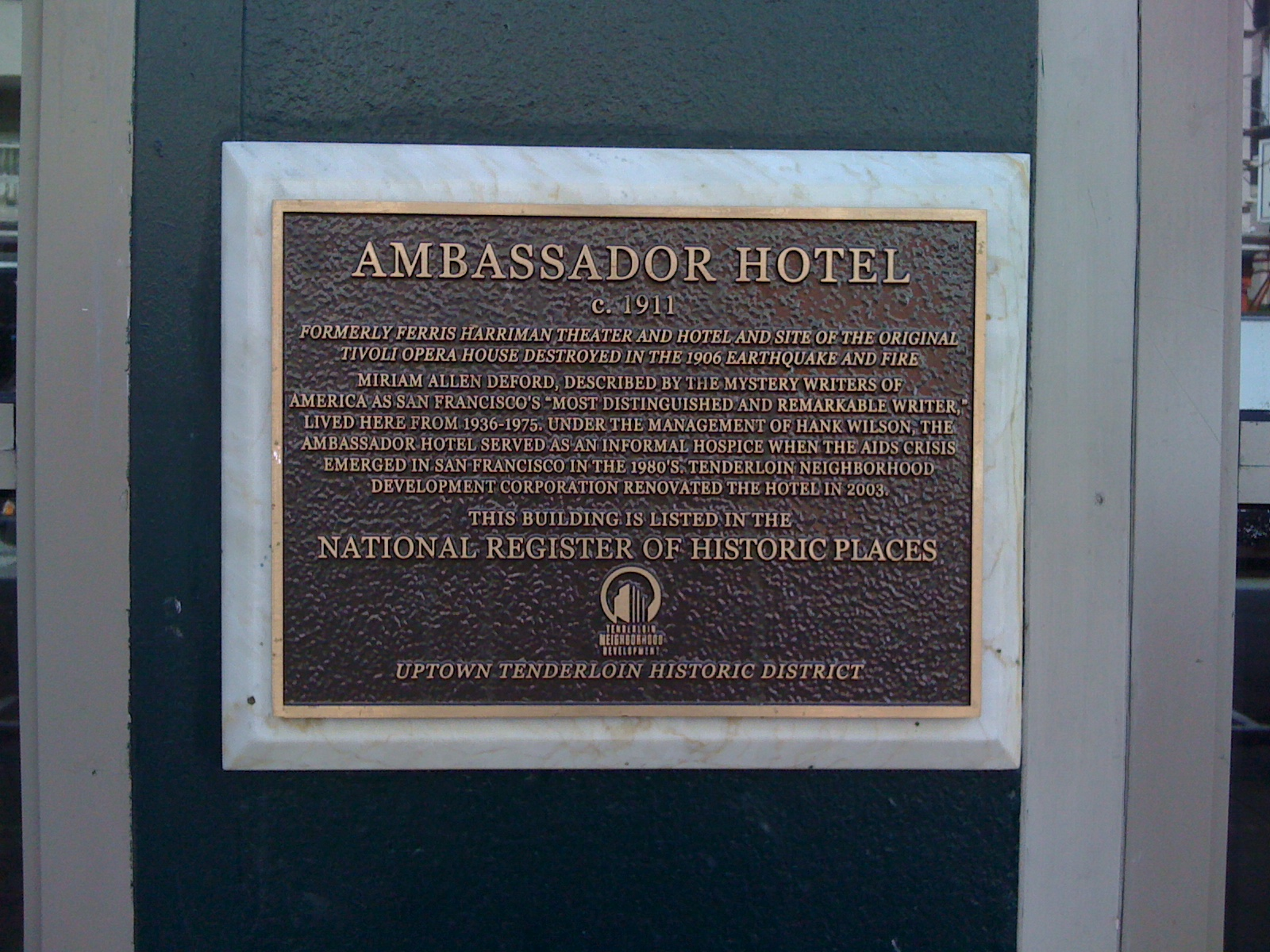
Plaque commemorating the hotel's placement on the National Register of Historic Places

The Ambassador Hotel is a six-story, 134-room single room occupancy hotel at 55 Mason Street in the Tenderloin district of San Francisco, California. The hotel was designed by Earl B. Scott & K. McDonald as the Ferris Harriman Hotel and Theater, and completed in 1911. It is a contributing property to the National Register of Historic Places's Uptown Tenderloin Historic District since 2009.

== History ==
The Ambassador Hotel was constructed in 1911 and an addition was completed in 1922. In 1923, the hotel was renamed Hotel Ambassador. In 1929, the theater was converted to a garage.

True crime author Miriam Allen deFord was a noted resident from 1936 until her death in 1975. From 1978 to 1996, the hotel was managed by Hank Wilson, a San Francisco LGBT activist, who made the hotel a model for harm reduction housing.

In 1993, photographer Paul Fusco published a series of photographs of some of the residents living with AIDS.

Over a period of many years, the hotel deteriorated. In 1994, KRON, San Francisco's channel 4, aired a documentary about the hotel and its residents, called Life and Death at the Ambassador Hotel, which documented the hotel's use as harm reduction housing.

=== Deterioration and repairs ===
During the late 1990s, a collection of activist and labor organizations worked with residents to organize to improve the buildings. The now defunct Eviction Defense Network collaborated with ACT-UP SF to outreach to tenants, resulting in a successful Rent Board decision to lower most of the residents' rents due to the dilapidated conditions. The Housing Rights Committee helped connect residents to an attorney who filed a successful class action lawsuit against the landlord. Tenderloin Housing Clinic pursued a strategy of filing complaints through the Department of Building Inspection. These tactics influenced the landlord's decision to sell the property.

In 2000, the property was acquired by Tenderloin Neighborhood Development Corporation (TNDC), a nonprofit corporation that buys and repairs properties primarily located in the San Francisco Tenderloin. Repairs were completed in November 2003, and it now serves as low-income housing.

== See also ==
- Hugo Hotel
- SRO hotel
