= Looper (surname) =

Looper (pronounced [ˈloːpər]) is a Dutch surname which literally means "runner". Notable people with this name include:

- Aaron Looper (born 1976), American baseball relief pitcher
- Anita Looper (also Antje Looper, born 1975), Dutch long-distance runner, see List of 5000 metres national champions
- Braden Looper (born 1974), American baseball pitcher
- Byron Looper (1964–2013), American politician and murderer
- Henk de Looper (1912–2006), Dutch field hockey player
- Jan de Looper (1914–1987), Dutch field hockey player who competed in the 1936 Summer Olympics
- Leroy Looper (1924–2011), American community organizer and housing activist in San Francisco
- Marsha Looper (born 1959), Colorado legislator
- Willem De Looper (1932–2009), American-Dutch abstract artist and chief curator at the Phillips Collection
