= Glenda Hope =

The Reverend Glenda Hope is a Presbyterian Church (USA) minister in San Francisco, California, United States. She heads San Francisco Network Ministries, a charity serving the Tenderloin district of San Francisco.

Glenda Hope was born in 1936 in Atlanta, Georgia, and grew up there in a Southern Baptist family. She received a BA in English Literature from Florida State University in 1958. In 1960, she completed an MA in English Bible at the Presbyterian School of Christian Education. In 1969, after she completed a Masters of Divinity at the San Francisco Theological Seminary, She was ordained in 1970 as an assistant pastor at the Old First Presbyterian Church.

She was ordained as the second ever female Presbyterian minister in PCUSA at Old First Presbyterian Church in San Francisco in 1969 where she served until 1972. At that time, Reverend Hope with her husband, Scott Hope, founded San Francisco Network Ministries. She also served as Pastor of Seventh Avenue Presbyterian Church from 1978 to 1989.

== San Francisco Network Ministries ==
Through San Francisco Network Ministries, Glenda has created many programs for the homeless and residents of the Tenderloin. In 1995, San Francisco Network Ministries provide affordable housing to families at 555 Ellis, housing and supportive services to sexually exploited homeless women through San Francisco SafeHouse, and drop in support services for women through The Hope Center. In 2008 SFNMHC in partnership with St. Antony’s Foundation formed Tenderloin Technology Lab (TTL) to offer computer training and digital access. Most notable, Network Ministries runs San Francisco SafeHouse for women escaping prostitution, as well as constructing a 38-unit affordable housing apartment building.

== Honors and recognitions ==
- In 1989 and 2004, she received the TenderChamp award from Central City Hospitality House.
- In 1991, Rev. Hope received the E.H. Johnson Memorial Trust Fund Award for her work in the Tenderloin.
- In 2001, she was recognized as an Unsung Hero of Compassion from the Dalai Lama.
- In 2004, she was honored in the American House of Representatives by Lynn Woolsey.
- In 2007, she was given an honorary degree from the University of San Francisco.
- On February 12, she will be honored by Cameron House of San Francisco Chinatown for the Excellence in Service and Leadership at their annual Soul & Elegance fundraiser.
