= Tenderloin Museum =

Cultural and historical center of the Tenderloin neighborhood, San Francisco

Coordinates: 37°47′2″N 122°24′51″W

The Tenderloin Museum is a cultural center dedicated to the history of the Tenderloin neighborhood in San Francisco.

== History and programming ==
The Tenderloin museum was founded in 2015 by Randy Shaw. It is known for its focus on living and popular history, rather than for its collection of artifacts. Its most important exhibition focused on the Tenderloin Times, a newspaper published in the neighborhood from 1977 to 1994 by Hospitality House.

The museum is known for giving visibility to the history of trans people, and the past and current challenges of addiction and homelessness in the neighborhood.

In 2026, the museum expanded from 3000 to 10,000 square feet and opened a permanent exhibition on local neon art.
