= Leroy Looper =

American activist (1924–2011)

- Born: Leroy Branch Looper; November 24, 1924; Philadelphia, Pennsylvania, U.S.
- Died: September 11, 2011 (aged 86); San Francisco, CA, U.S.
- Education: Antioch University West
- Occupations: Activist, Community organizer, Entrepreneur
- Known for: Co-founding the Tenderloin Housing Clinic, the Cadillac Hotel, Reality House West, and YouthBuild USA.
- Awards: NEN Hall of Fame 2011

Leroy Branch Looper (November 24, 1924 – September 11, 2011), was an American community organizer and founder of several low-income housing facilities, programs for addiction recovery, and education initiatives in San Francisco. He was known by locals as "the father of the Tenderloin".

In 1979, Looper purchased the Cadillac Hotel in the Tenderloin, with the goal of saving the building and creating housing for the unhoused in the city within the single-residence occupancy (SRO) building.
