= Sylvain Schnaittacher =

American architect

Sylvain Schnaittacher (1874–1926) was an American architect. He served as director and as president of the American Institute of Architects chapter in San Francisco, and then during 1918–1920 he served as the Western States regional director.

== Biography ==
Sylvain Schnaittacher was born in San Francisco. He trained in the office of architect A. Page Brown during 1891–1896. He partnered with Frank Van Trees.

Among other works, he designed the Paige Motor Car Co. Building (1919–1922), at 1699 Van Ness Avenue in San Francisco, California, which is listed on the National Register of Historic Places.

== Works ==
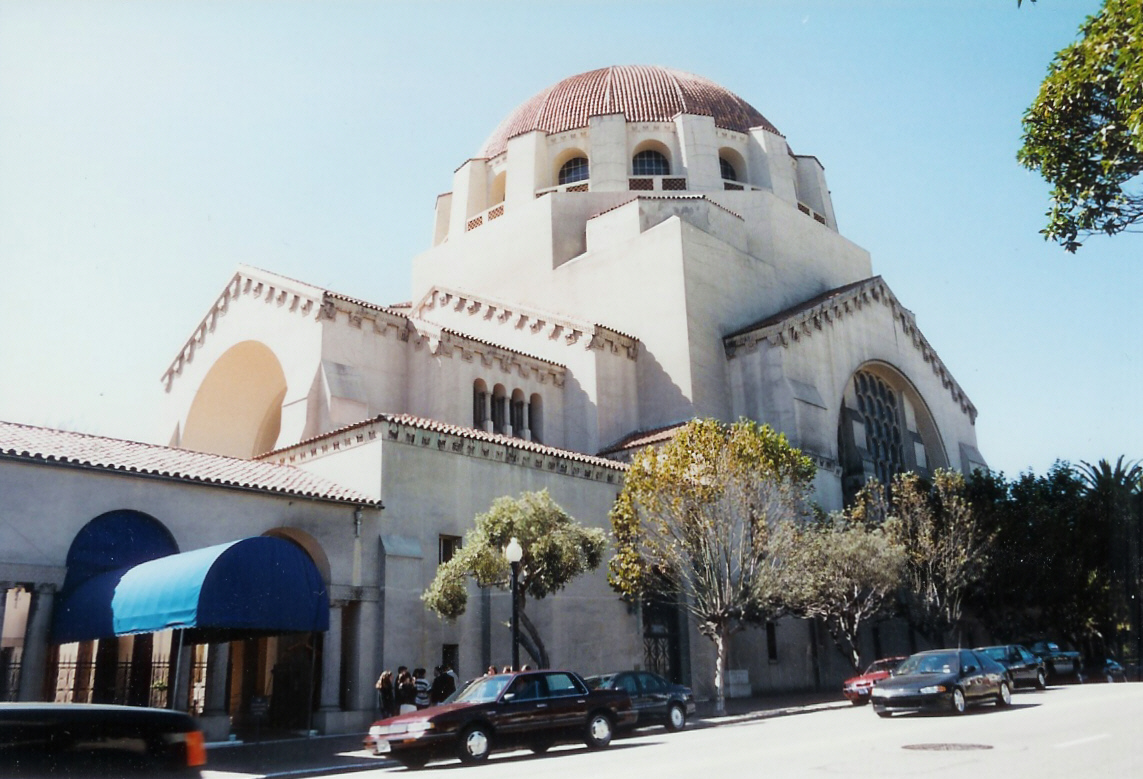
Congregation Emanu-El

- Paige Motor Car Company Building (1919, 1922)
- Argonaut Club
- Beresford Country Club
- Mt. Zion Nurses' Home on Sutter Street, San Francisco, California
- Temple Emanu-El, San Francisco, California; designed in cooperation with Bakewell & Brown, who finished the project after Schnaittacher's death.
- 869–883 Geary Street (1922), San Francisco, California; Spanish Colonial Revival commercial building, a contributing building in the Uptown Tenderloin Historic District listed on the National Register of Historic Places
