= Antioch University (San Francisco) =

University, 1971–1989

Coordinates: 37°47′29″N 122°24′23″W

Antioch University West
- Former names: Antioch College/West; Antioch University West
- Active: 1971–1989
- Parent institution: Antioch University
- Location: San Francisco, California, United States

Antioch College/West (later part of Antioch University West, San Francisco; or AUW), was a college and later university active from 1971 until 1989 and located in San Francisco, California, U.S..

== History ==
Meetings among staff and students at Antioch College in Yellow Springs, Ohio began in about 1971 discussing the idea of a University Without Walls program in San Francisco to be known as Antioch College/West. Antioch College/West was the precursor to programs that later included many campuses formed by Antioch University in San Francisco, California. It was one of many campuses formed by Antioch University, a national university, which had its genesis with Antioch College in Yellow Springs, Ohio in 1852. The San Francisco campus closed in July, 1989. The current campuses include Antioch University New England (Keene, New Hampshire), Antioch University Midwest (Yellow Springs, Ohio), Antioch University Los Angeles, Antioch University Santa Barbara and Antioch University Seattle.

Antioch College/West was founded in a yellow brick building on 9th Street between Mission and Market Street in the early 1970s. When the university outgrew its 9th Street space in 1972 it moved to warehouse space on Mission Street between 7th & 8th Streets. Students built a darkroom and had art classes and studio space on the 4th floor of the warehouse. For a time students were involved in urban gardening on the roof where chickens were also raised. Sometime after 1975 the college moved to space in the Cogswell College building on Stockton Street above the Stockton Street Tunnel where it remained until 1985. In 1989, the school moved to 50 Fell Street, leasing space from New College of California. It closed in 1989.

Notable alumni of Antioch College/West include Leroy Looper, and Helène Aylon (MA 1980).

Antioch College in Ohio was closed financial reasons effective June 30, 2008. On September 4, 2009, the college's assets were transferred to an independent corporation known as Antioch College Continuation Corporation (ACCC). ACCC reopened the college as an independent institution in the fall of 2011. It operates under the name "Antioch College" by virtue of a license from Antioch University.
