= Uptown Tenderloin Historic District =

Historic district in San Francisco County, California, U.S.

- U.S. National Register of Historic Places
- U.S. Historic district
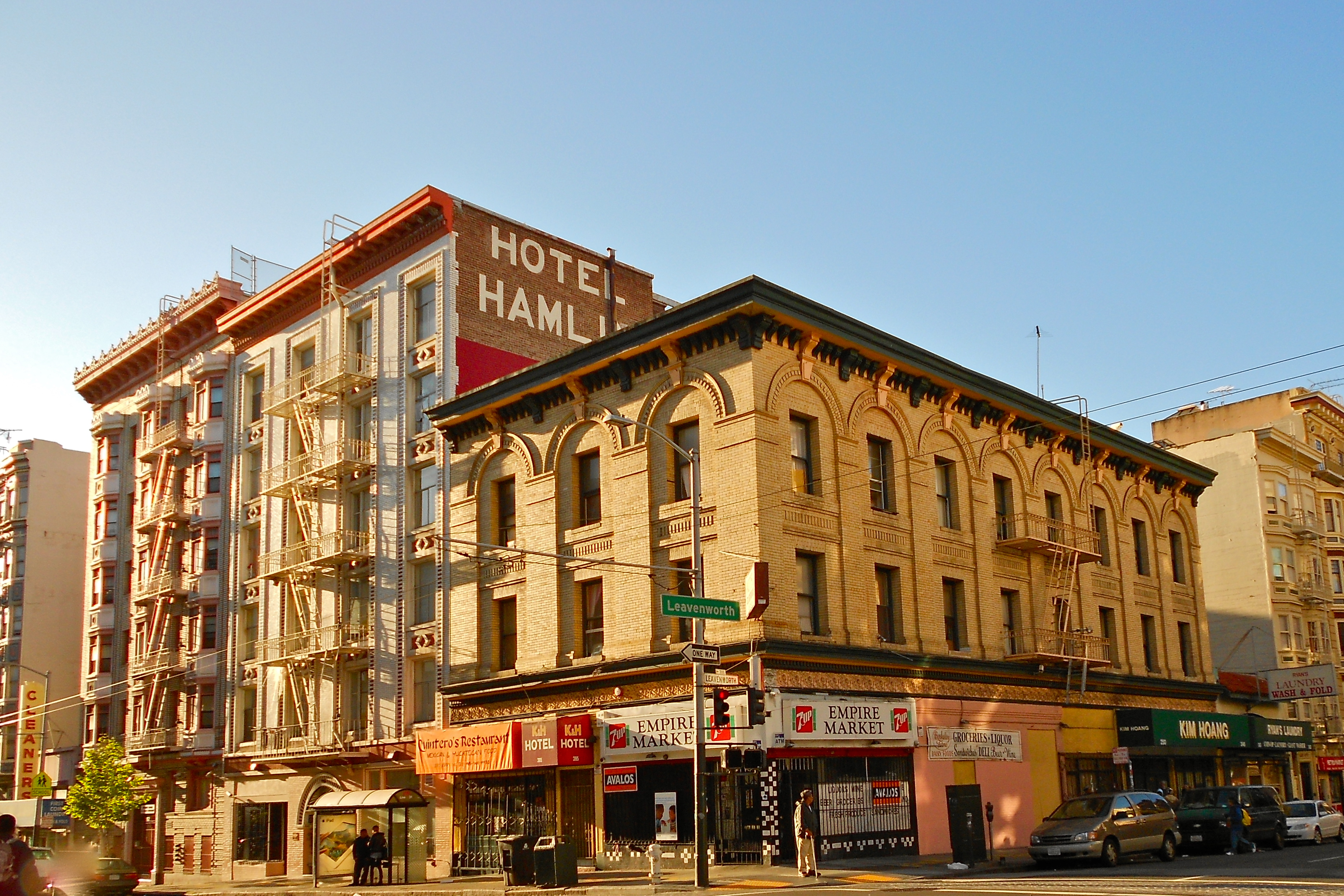

- Location within San Francisco County Location within California
- Location: roughly bounded by Market, McAllister, Golden Gate, Larkin, Geary, Taylor, Ellis Streets, San Francisco, California, U.S.
- Coordinates: 37°47′12″N 122°25′06″W
- Area: 110 acres (45 ha)
- Built: 1906
- Architectural style: Beaux Arts, Colonial Revival, Classical Revival
- NRHP reference No.: 08001407
- Added to NRHP: February 5, 2009

The Uptown Tenderloin Historic District is a historic district located in the Tenderloin neighborhood of San Francisco, California, U.S.. It has 408 contributing buildings and covers roughly a 33-city block radius in downtown San Francisco. The Uptown Tenderloin Historic District was listed on the National Register of Historic Places on February 5, 2009, for architecture and social history.

== History ==
Prior to the adoption of the NRHP, the district was informally adopted but not officially recognized. There are 73 plaques on historic buildings in the district, to commemorate the NRHP listing.

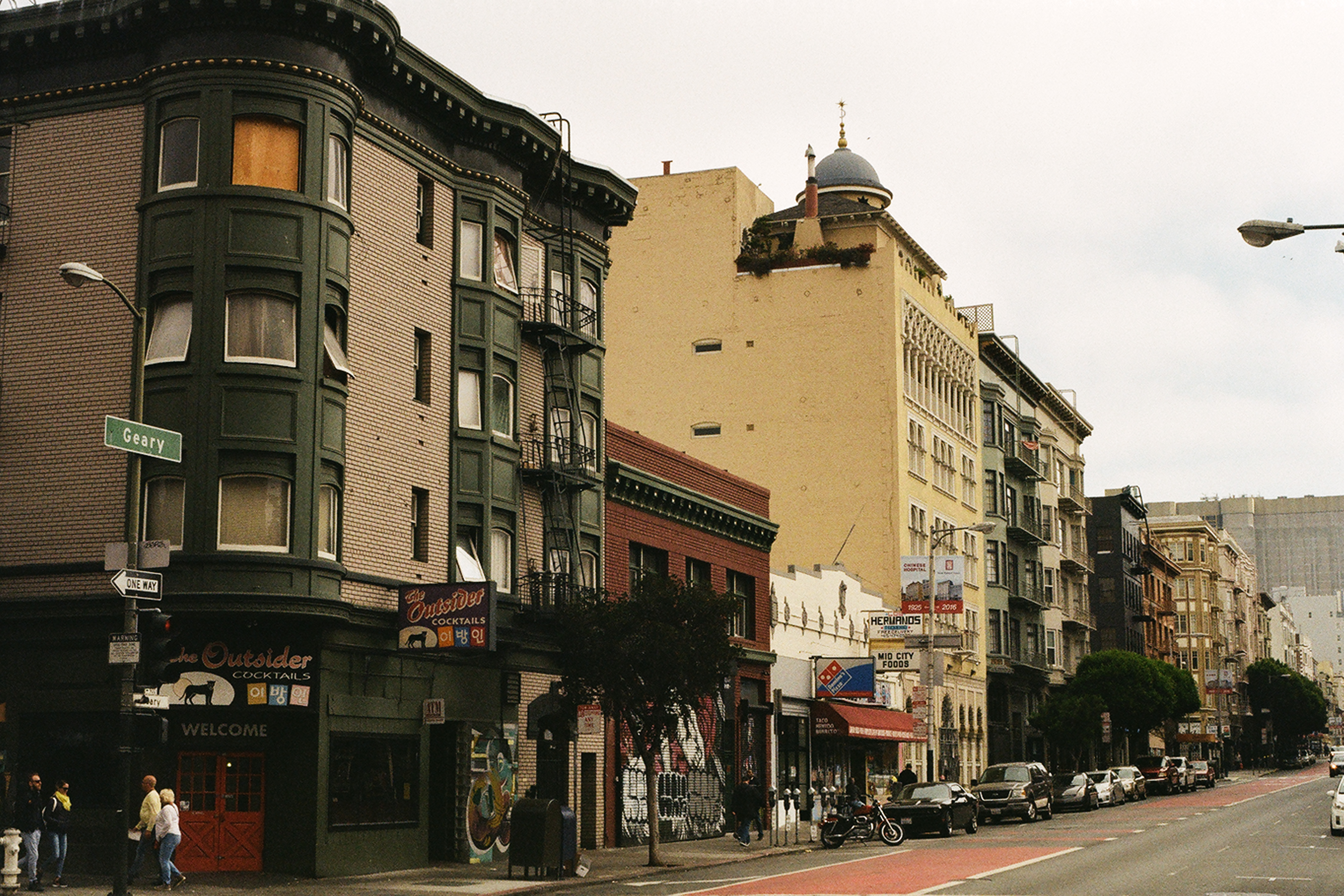
Geary Street at Larkin Street

It is roughly a 33-city block radius and bounded by Market, McAllister, Golden Gate, Larkin, Taylor, Ellis Streets, and Geary Streets. The Uptown Tenderloin Historic District has 408 contributing buildings and 1 site, and most buildings are at the height of three to seven stories. This district is located near other National Register of Historic Places defined historic districts, at the north (Lower Nob Hill Apartment Hotel District), the south (Civic Center Historic District), and the southeast (Market Street Theater and Loft District).

The Uptown Tenderloin Historic District is an inner-city high-density residential area constructed primarily during the years 1906 until 1941; a period defined by the 1906 earthquake (and fires) and by the Great Depression. After 1906, the city required fire-resistant construction in the district, which has helped define the boundaries. There are many building types including boarding houses, hotels, commercial spaces, and apartments. The architectural styles include Tudor Revival, Spanish Colonial Revival, Italian Renaissance Revival, Georgian Revival, and a few Moderne towers.

== List of notable buildings ==
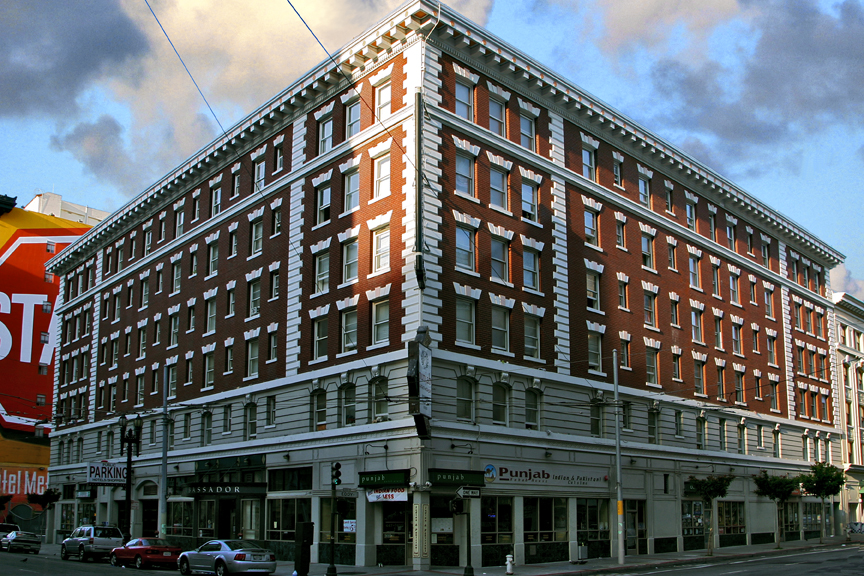
Ambassador Hotel, San Francisco

- Hotel Cecil (1906), 156–160 Eddy Street; designed by Mexican-born architect Albert Pissis
- Cadillac Hotel (c. 1908), 366–394 Eddy Street; San Francisco Designated Landmark-listed
- Saint Boniface Church (1908), 133–175 Golden Gate Avenue; San Francisco Designated Landmark-listed
- Herald Hotel (1910), 302–316 Eddy Street; NRHP-listed and designed by architect Alfred Henry Jacobs
- Ambassador Hotel (1911), 55 Mason Street
- Cameo Apartments (1916), 485 Eddy Street (now 481 Eddy Street); designed by Rousseau and Rousseau
- William Taylor Hotel and Temple Methodist Episcopal Church (1920), 100 McAllister Street
- 869–883 Geary Street (1922); designed by architect Sylvain Schnaittacher
- Hotel Californian (1923), 403–405 Taylor Street; NRHP-listed
- YMCA Hotel (1928), 351–359 Turk Street; NRHP-listed
- Hotel Union (1929), 811 Geary Street
- Glide Memorial Church (1929), 330 Ellis Street; NRHP-listed

== See also ==
- National Register of Historic Places listings in San Francisco
