= Mirikitani =

Mirikitani is a Japanese surname. It may refer to:

- The Cats of Mirikitani, a 2006 documentary film
- Jimmy Mirikitani, a New York artist
- Janice Mirikitani, poet laureate of San Francisco
