= Janice Mirikitani =

American writer (1941–2021)

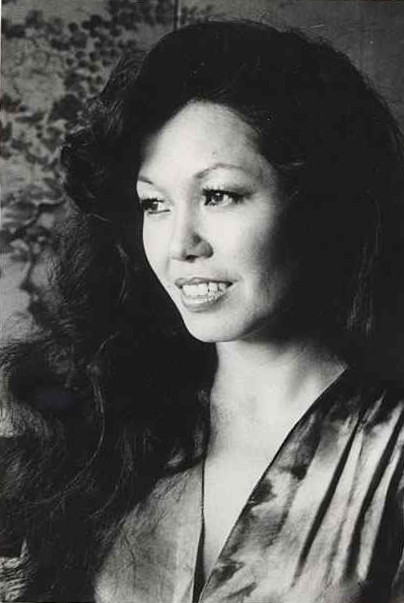
- Mirikitani in 1977
- Born: February 5, 1941; Stockton, California, U.S.
- Died: July 29, 2021 (aged 80); San Francisco, California, U.S.
- Education: San Francisco State University
- Alma mater: University of California, Los Angeles
- Occupations: Poet, activist, community organizer
- Spouse: Cecil Williams (m. 1982)
- Children: 1

Janice Mirikitani (February 5, 1941 – July 29, 2021) was an American poet and activist who resided in the San Francisco Bay Area for most of her adult life. She managed the Glide Memorial Church with her husband, Cecil Williams. She was noted for serving as San Francisco's poet laureate from 2000 until 2002.

== Early life ==
Mirikitani was born in Stockton, California, on February 5, 1941, and was Sansei (third-generation Japanese American). Her parents, Shigemi and Ted Mirikitani, worked as chicken farmers in San Joaquin County. In 1942, during the World War II incarceration of Japanese Americans, she and her family were sent to the Rohwer War Relocation Center in Arkansas. Following the war, the family moved to Chicago.

After her parents divorced, Janice was brought back to a chicken farm at Petaluma, California, with her mother, where they would be near the remainder of their family. During the time that followed, Janice became the victim of sexual molestation by her step-father up to the age of sixteen, and was saved from suicide only by the love and care of her grandmother. She would later speak of the pain of her incestuous abuse through her poetry.

Mirikitani attended UCLA, earning a Bachelor of Arts degree. During this time, she struggled with her ethnic identity, which she would later portray through her poetry. After gaining her teaching credentials, she taught in the Contra Costa School District for a year. She worked at Glide Memorial Church in the Tenderloin district of San Francisco as an administrative assistant. She then entered graduate school for creative writing at San Francisco State University, but later discontinued her studies.

== Political activities ==
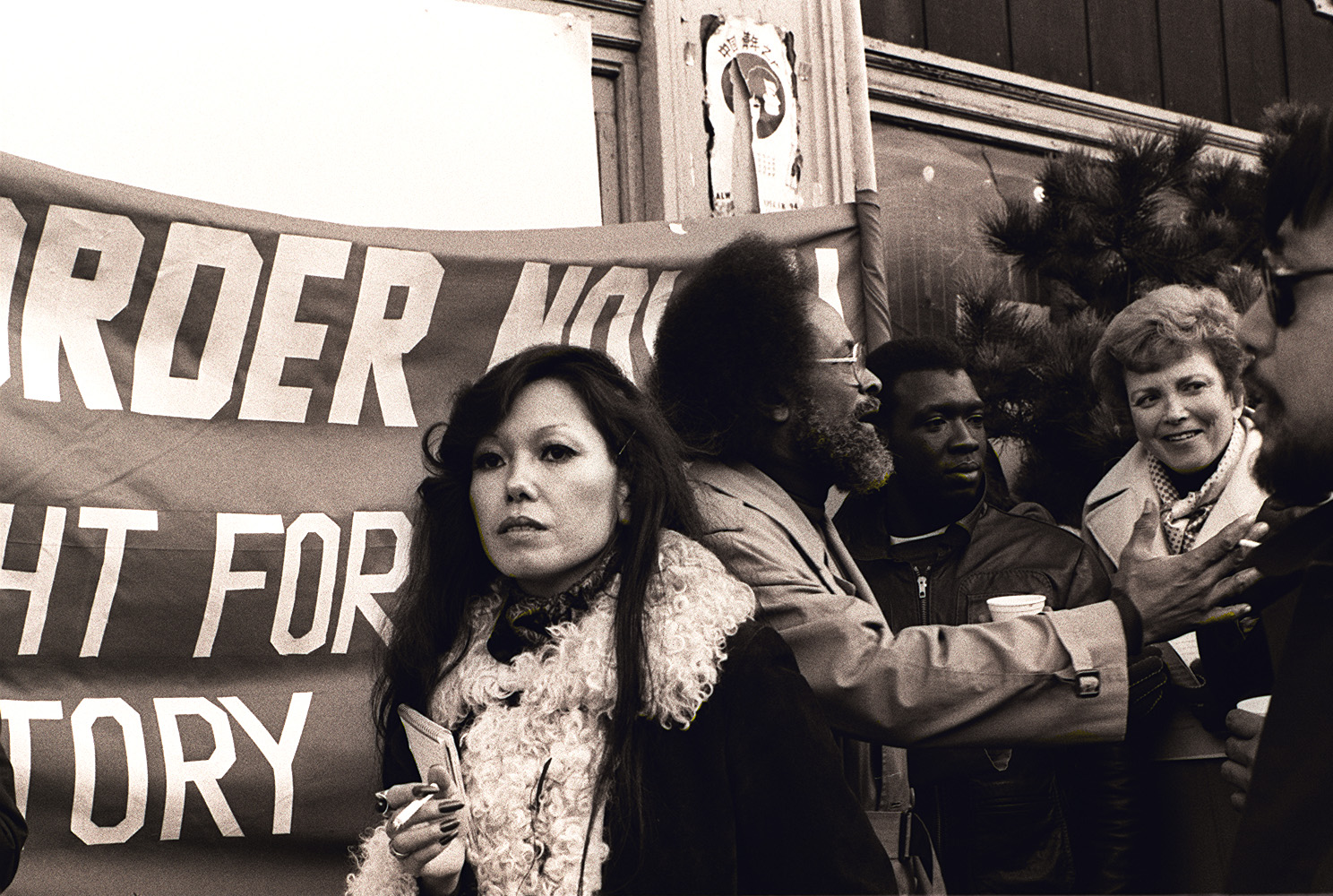
Mirikitani next to Cecil Williams at a protest in San Francisco, California, in 1977. City supervisor Dorothy von Beroldingen is at right.

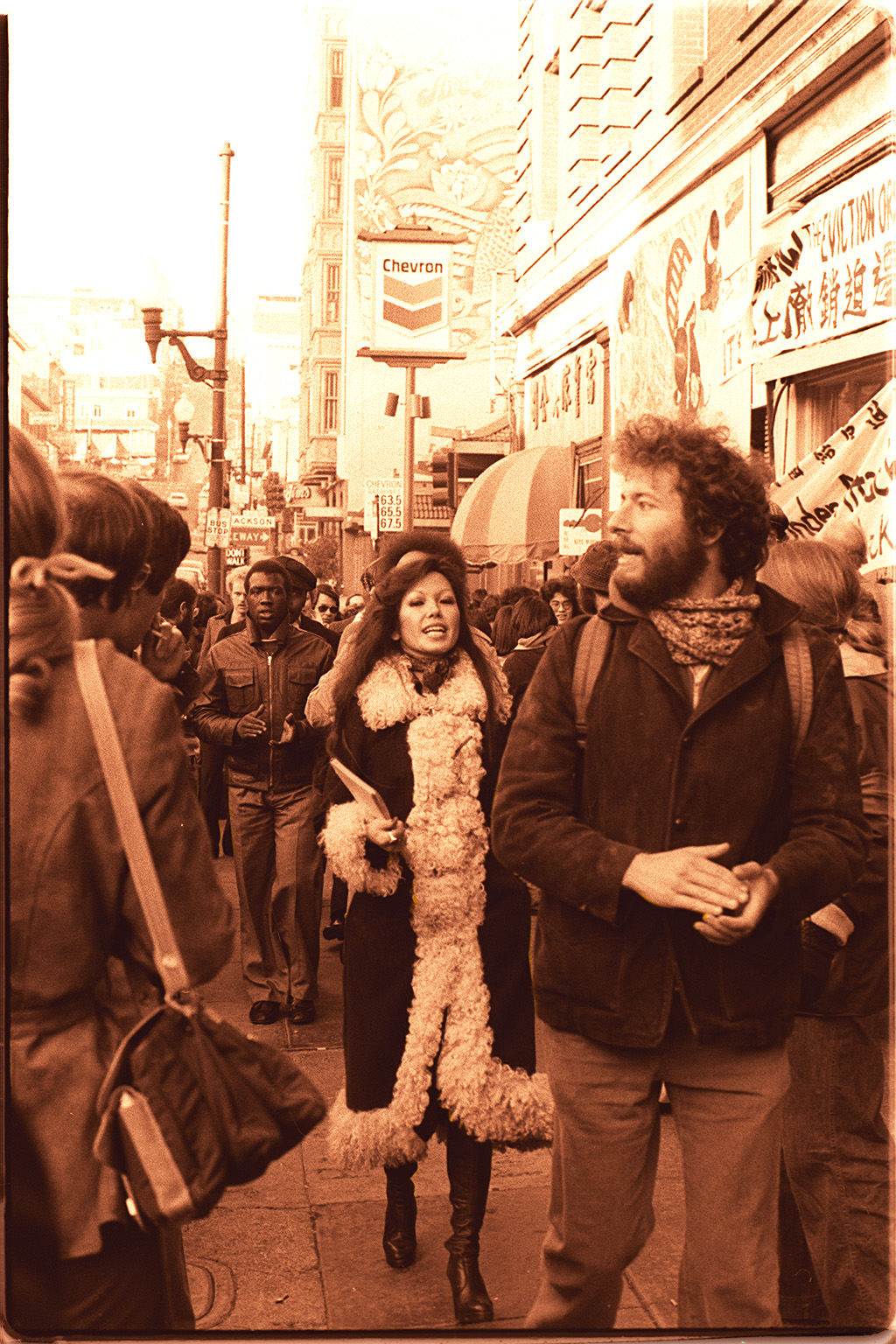
Mirikitani of Glide Memorial Church joined protesters in front of the International Hotel, January 1977.

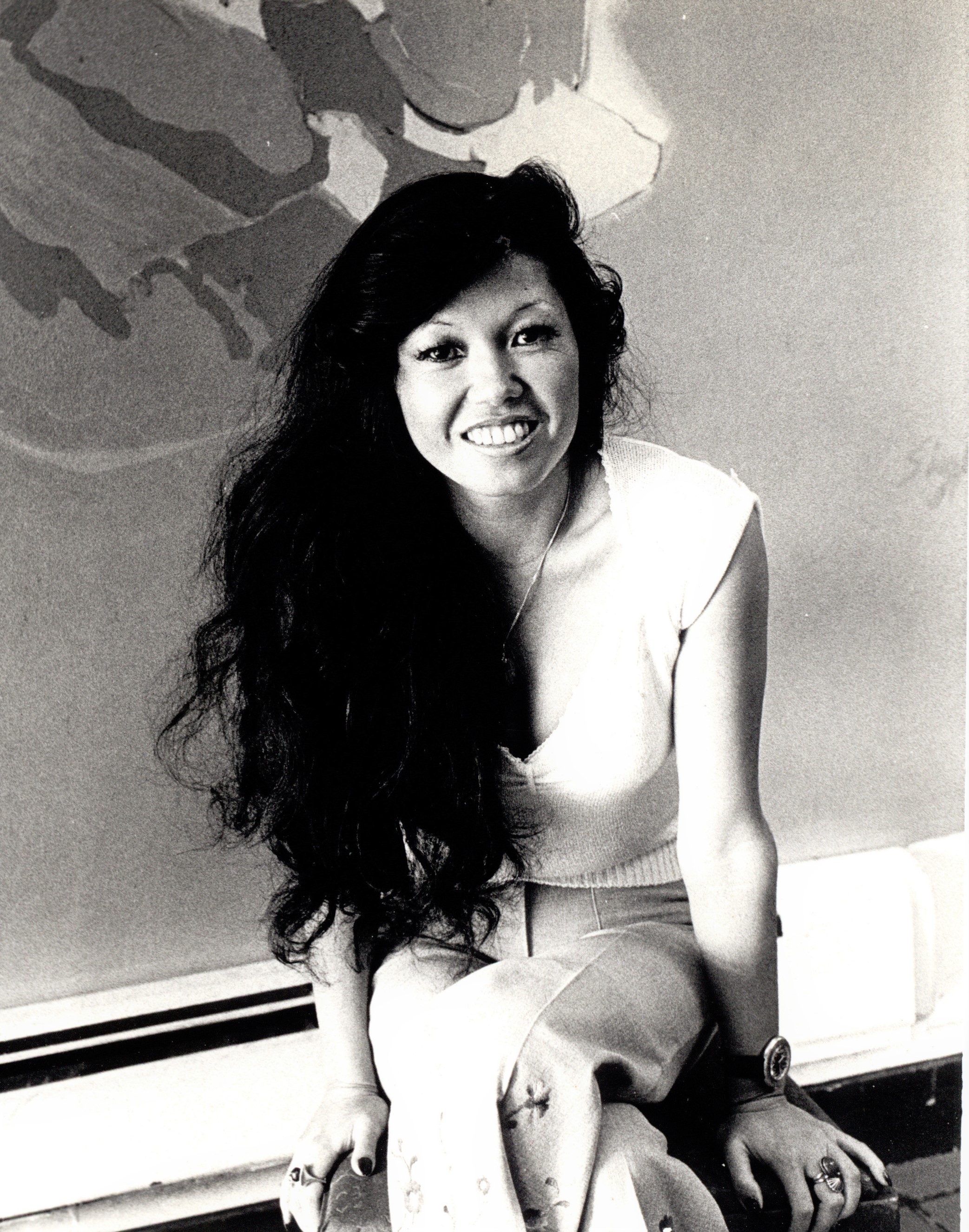
Mirikitani in San Francisco, 1977.

After participating in the Asian American Political Alliance, she joined Third World Communications. She later co-founded and edited Aion – regarded as the first Asian American literary magazine – which published just two issues in 1970 before folding. She edited two anthologies for Third World Communications: Third World Women (1972) and Time to Greez! Incantations from the Third World (1975). Mirikitani then became project director for Ayumi: A Japanese American Anthology (1980).

After two years of activism for Glide Memorial United Methodist Church in 1969 she became the program director. In 1982 Mirikitani married Cecil Williams, who was pastor of the church. That same year she was chosen as the president of the Glide Foundation, where she was responsible for fund raising and budget oversight. She was named the second poet laureate for the city of San Francisco in 2000, and she served in that role for two years. The California State Assembly named her "Woman of the Year" for the 17th Assembly District.

== Personal life ==
Mirikitani had one child, daughter Tianne Miller from her first marriage. One of her cousins was the painter Jimmy Mirikitani.

Mirikitani died on the morning of July 29, 2021, at the age of 80. The cause of death was cancer.

== Bibliography ==
- Mirikitani, Janice (1978). Awake in the River. Isthmus Press. ISBN 9780913386507.
- Mirikitani, Janice (1980). Ayumi: A Japanese American Anthology. Japanese American Anthology Committee. ISBN 9780960322206.
- Mirikitani, Janice (1987). Shedding Silence. Celestial Arts. ISBN 9780890874967.
- Mirikitani, Janice (1995). We, the Dangerous: New and Selected Poems. Celestial Arts. ISBN 9780890877678.
- Mirikitani, Janice (2001). Love Works. City Lights Foundation Books, San Francisco Poet Laureates. City Lights Foundation Books. ISBN 9781931404020.
- Mirikitani, Janice (2014). Out of the Dust: New and Selected Poems. Intersections: Asian and Pacific American Transcultural Studies. University of Hawaii Press. ISBN 9780824847944.
- Williams, Cecil; Mirikitani, Janice (2013). Beyond the Possible: 50 Years of Creating Radical Change in a Community Called Glide. Dave Eggers (Forward). Harper Collins. ISBN 9780062105059.
