= Karen Hanrahan =

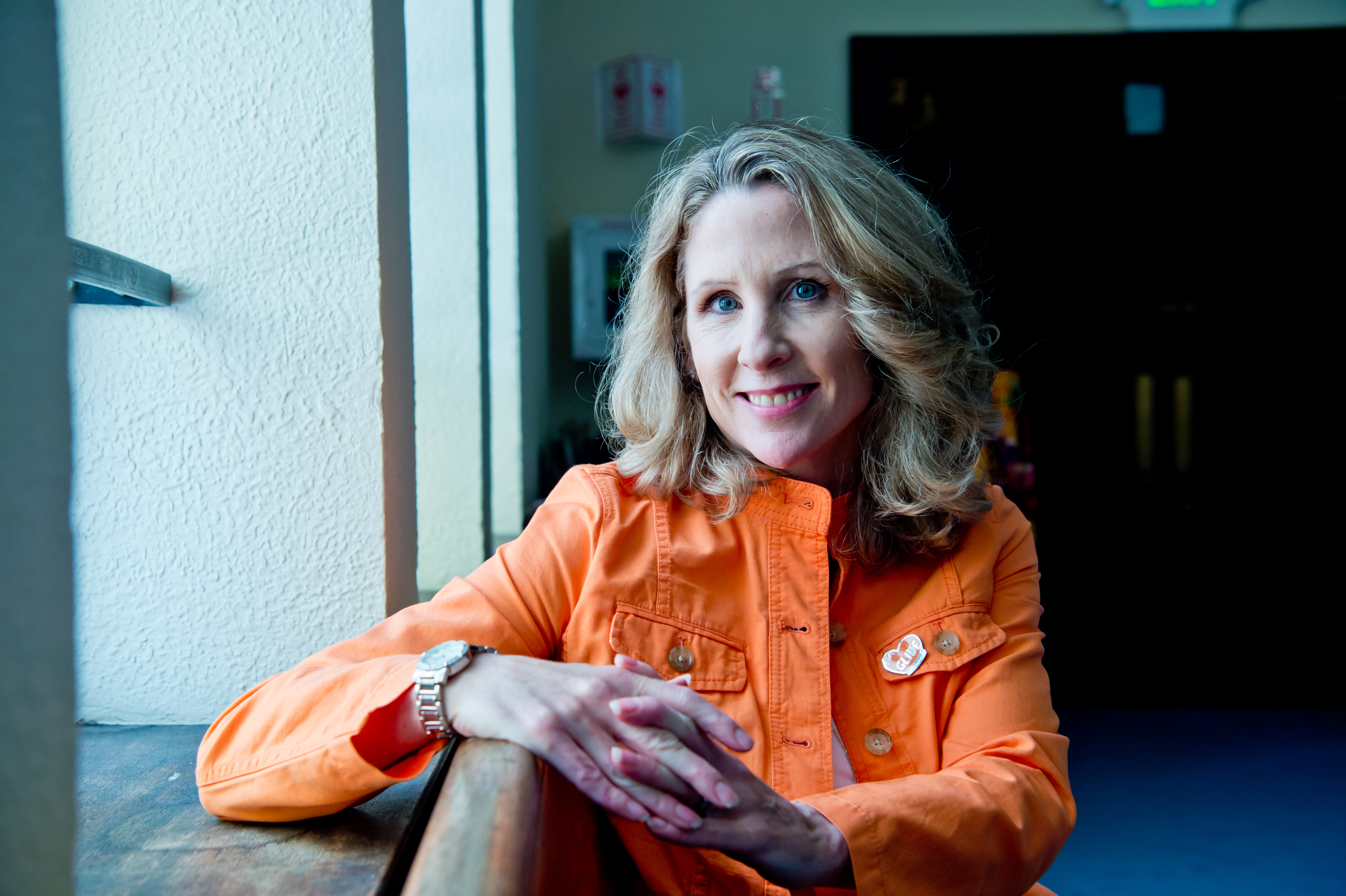
Karen Hanrahan in 2011

Karen Hanrahan is the former president and CEO of the Glide Foundation, a social justice organization based in San Francisco, California. From 2009 to 2015, she served as a Barack Obama appointee in the State Department, where she was the US Coordinator for International Assistance to Afghanistan and Pakistan and later the Deputy Assistant Secretary for Democracy, Human Rights, and Labor. She was appointed CEO of the Glide Foundation in 2017.

== Early life and education ==
Hanrahan is a native of Indianapolis and received her Political Science and Journalism degree at Indiana University in 1992. Hanrahan holds several advanced degrees. She received a Master of Arts in International Politics with a concentration in peace and conflict resolution from American University. She graduated in 2000 from the University of Washington School of Law with honors and at the top 5 percent of her class. While pursuing her law degree, Hanrahan served as the Law Review editor. She is also a graduate of Harvard Business School's Advanced Management Program.

== Career ==
Hanrahan has served as a senior leader in international human rights and capacity building organizations such as the United States Agency for International Development in Iraq, Amnesty International, Search for Common Ground, and the United Nations. She spent years in war zones and unstable countries that included Afghanistan, Africa, the Middle East, and Asia.

From 2009 to 2015, Hanrahan served as a White House appointee under President Barack Obama, serving in the State Department as the US Coordinator for International Assistance to Afghanistan and Pakistan and most recently as the Deputy Assistant Secretary for Democracy, Human Rights, and Labor. While serving in the State Department, Hanrahan was selected to design and lead the Quadrennial Diplomacy and Development Review (the QDDR) by former Secretary of State Hillary Clinton.

In 2017, Hanrahan was appointed president and chief executive officer of GLIDE. In 2018, the San Francisco Business Times named her one of the "Most Influential Women in Bay Area Business."

== Personal life ==
Hanrahan is married to Dean Wagner. They have two children.
