= The Cats of Mirikitani =

- Directed by: Linda Hattendorf
- Produced by: Linda Hattendorf; Masa Yoshikawa
- Starring: Jimmy Mirikitani
- Music by: Joel Goodman
- Release date: April 2006 (Tribeca)
- Running time: 74 minutes
- Country: United States
- Languages: English; Japanese

The Cats of Mirikitani is a 2006 documentary film.

== Synopsis ==
In 2001, Japanese American painter Jimmy Mirikitani (born Tsutomu Mirikitani), over 80 years old, was living on the streets of lower Manhattan. Filmmaker Linda Hattendorf took an interest, and began to engage with him to create a documentary of his life. After the destruction of the World Trade Center on September 11, 2001, the debris- and dust-choked streets were deserted. When Hattendorf "found" Mirikitani, in his usual spot along the wall of a Korean market, near the intersection of MacDougal and Prince Street in Soho, she offered him shelter in her small apartment. During this period a beautiful and curious friendship flowered, as Ms. Hattendorf began the long process of re-integrating Mr. Mirikitani into society, recovering, among other documents, his social security card and passport. Over the months they lived together, she uncovered his true identity and history. Ultimately, she reunited him with his distant cousin, poet Janice Mirikitani, and his surviving sister, and helped him find his own apartment in an assisted living facility.

Over the course of the film, audiences learn about Mirikitani's past, including the injustice experienced by American-born Japanese during the Second World War, his career as an artist, his life among other artists, including Jackson Pollock. Ms. Hattendorf documents Mirikitani's epic journey, from California, to Hiroshima, back to California, to his imprisonment in an internment camp, to his sojourn across the country to Long Island and finally to New York City, where he was employed as a cook. When his employer died, Mirikitani became homeless, spending almost a decade in Washington Square Park. Later, he moved to the streets of Soho, where he created an atelier on the streets, and worked days and nights on his artwork.

Hattendorf's film tackles serious themes like justice, loss, and redemption, earning awards stateside and abroad. It's a personal project that not only boosted Hattendorf's reputation but also shed light on Mirikitani's significant artwork - the "cats" in the title are a nod to his art.

In May 2007 The Cats of Mirikitani aired on the PBS series Independent Lens.

Mirikitani died October 21, 2012, at the age of 92. Director Linda Hattendorf and her collaborator, Masa Yoshikawa, were at Mirikitani's deathbed.

== Reception ==
On review aggregator website Rotten Tomatoes, the film holds an approval rating of 96% based on 26 reviews, with an average rating of 7.6/10.

== Awards ==
- Won the Audience Award at the 2006 Tribeca Film Festival.
- Won the Best Picture Award in the Japanese Eyes section of the 2006 Tokyo International Film Festival
- Won the audience award at the 2007 Lyon Film festival (Lyfe / Hors-Ecran)
