= Glide Memorial Church =

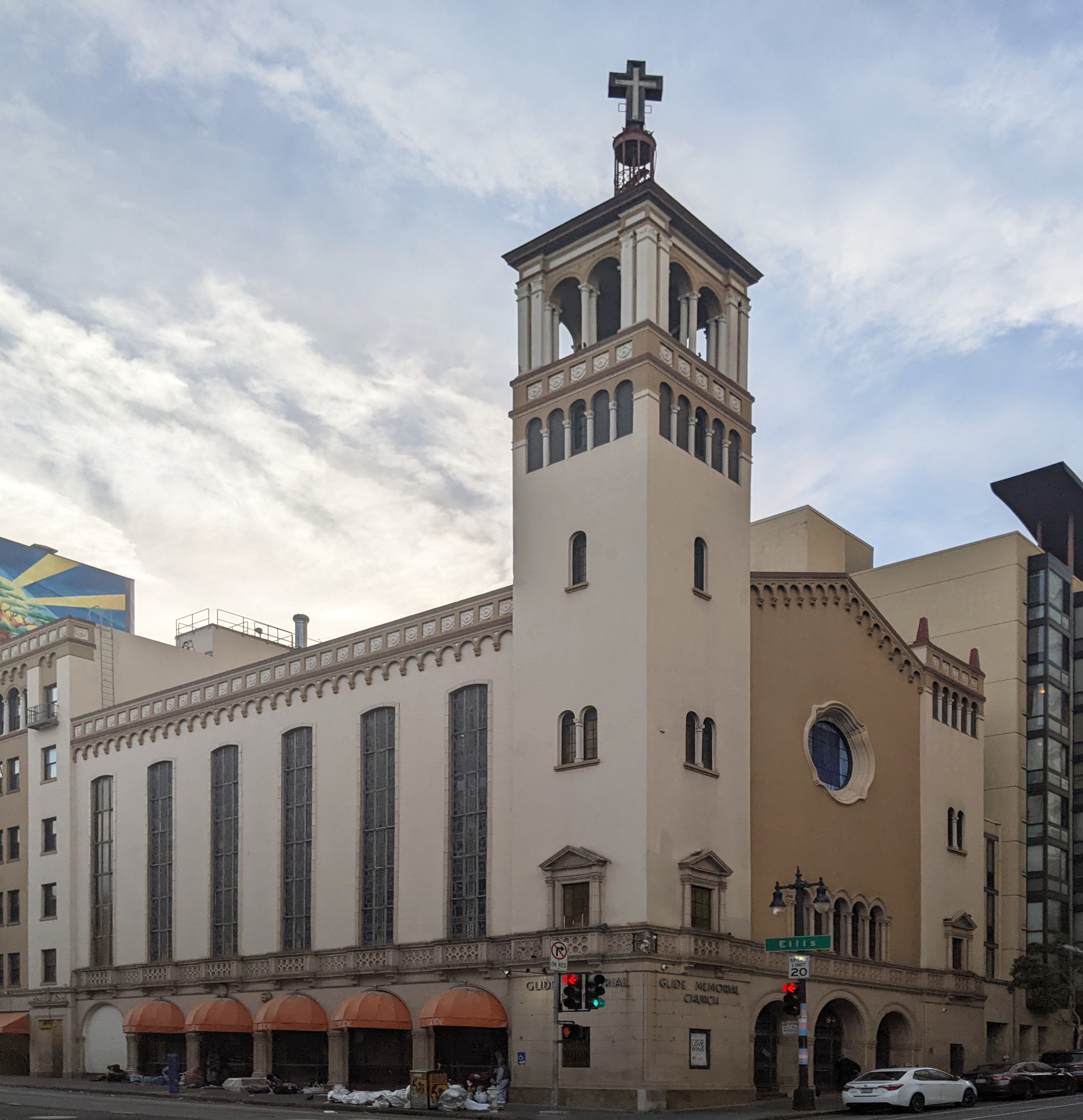
- Glide Memorial Church in 2022

- Location of Glide Memorial in San Francisco
- 37°47′7″N 122°24′41″W
- Location: 330 Ellis Street; San Francisco, California
- Country: United States
- Denomination: Nondenominational
- Website: www.glide.org

History
- Founded: 1929
- Founder: Lizzie Glide

Architecture
- Completed: 1931

Administration
- District: Bridges District

Glide Memorial Church is a nondenominational church in San Francisco, California, which opened in 1930. Since the 1960s, it has served as a counter-culture rallying point, as one of the most prominently liberal churches in the United States. Located in the city's Tenderloin neighborhood, an area affected by drug addiction and homelessness, Glide is known for its social service programs, as well as the Glide Ensemble, its Gospel choir. The church building was listed on the National Register of Historic Places in 2022.

== History ==
In 1929, Methodist philanthropist Lizzie Glide purchased a parcel of land at the intersection of Ellis and Taylor Streets in San Francisco and founded the Glide Foundation as a memorial to her millionaire cattleman husband, H.L. Glide of Sacramento. Construction of Glide Memorial Methodist Church was completed two years later. Glide purchased the Hotel Californian two blocks away and it was operated as a temperance hotel for decades. The foundation also built a dormitory for Christian women at U.C. Berkeley and a home for young working Christian women at 403 Taylor Street (formerly Hotel Californian).

On December 22, 1960, John Charles Daly married Virginia Warren (1928–2009), daughter of then–chief justice Earl Warren, at Glide Memorial Church. Justice Warren attended the wedding.

Glide's revival began in 1962. For a full year, the Rev. Louis Durham studied the ministry needs in San Francisco and travelled to Methodist churches throughout the region to learn about how they were responding to the needs of young adults. The Rev. Ted McIlvenna was hired in January 1963 to care for young adults in urban society. Later that same year, the Rev. Donald Kuhn was hired in the communications division and the Rev. Cecil Williams was hired to lead the church and community division.

The Rev. Donald Kuhn adapted the communications division to meet the needs of a constantly changing community in San Francisco. The board approved the publication of its first book Reluctant Revolution. Glide published several important books including the first positive book about lesbians, by Del Martin and Phyllis Lyon.

In 1966, the board merged the staff of the church and the urban center. The Rev. John Moore, who was then the church's pastor, helped its staff become part of the Glide Urban Center. The Rev. Cecil Williams commenced leadership when he "took over a small congregation and opened it to the neighborhood's poor and disenfranchised — including drug addicts, prostitutes and gay runaways" (as summarized later by the San Francisco Chronicle).

Glide Memorial Church organized coalitions and interfaith communities to support historically marginalized communities. In 1964, the Glide church helped form the Council on Religion and the Homosexual in an effort to close the gap between people of faith and the LGBTQ community. The church also replaced traditional hymns with jazz and blues music, and its message of "unconditional love and acceptance" would come to resonate with celebrities including Quincy Jones, Marvin Gaye, Bono, Maya Angelou, Robin Williams, Oprah Winfrey, Sharon Stone and Warren Buffett.

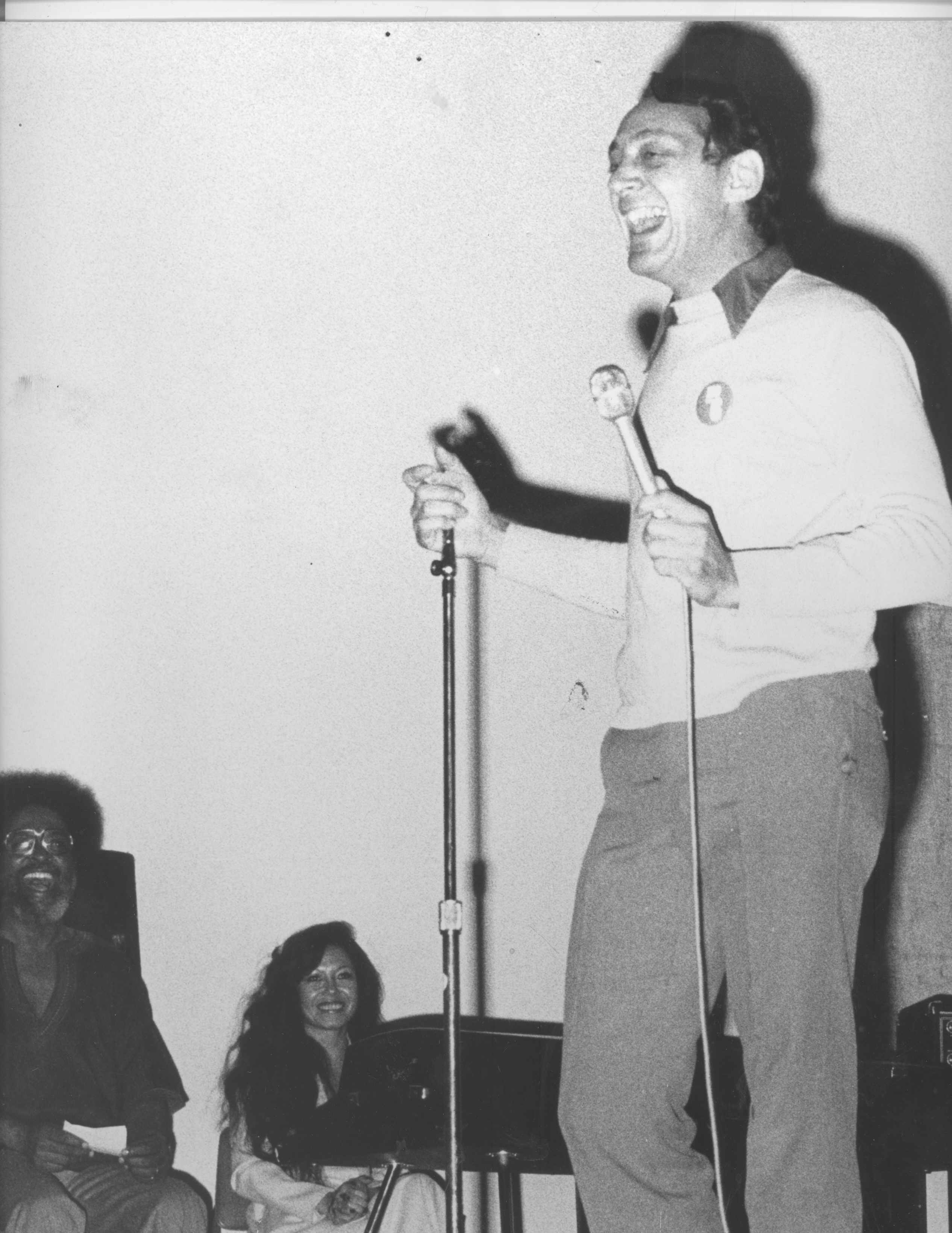
Harvey Milk laughs while speaking at Glide Memorial Church. Janice Mirikitani and the Rev. Cecil Williams can also be seen in this photo.

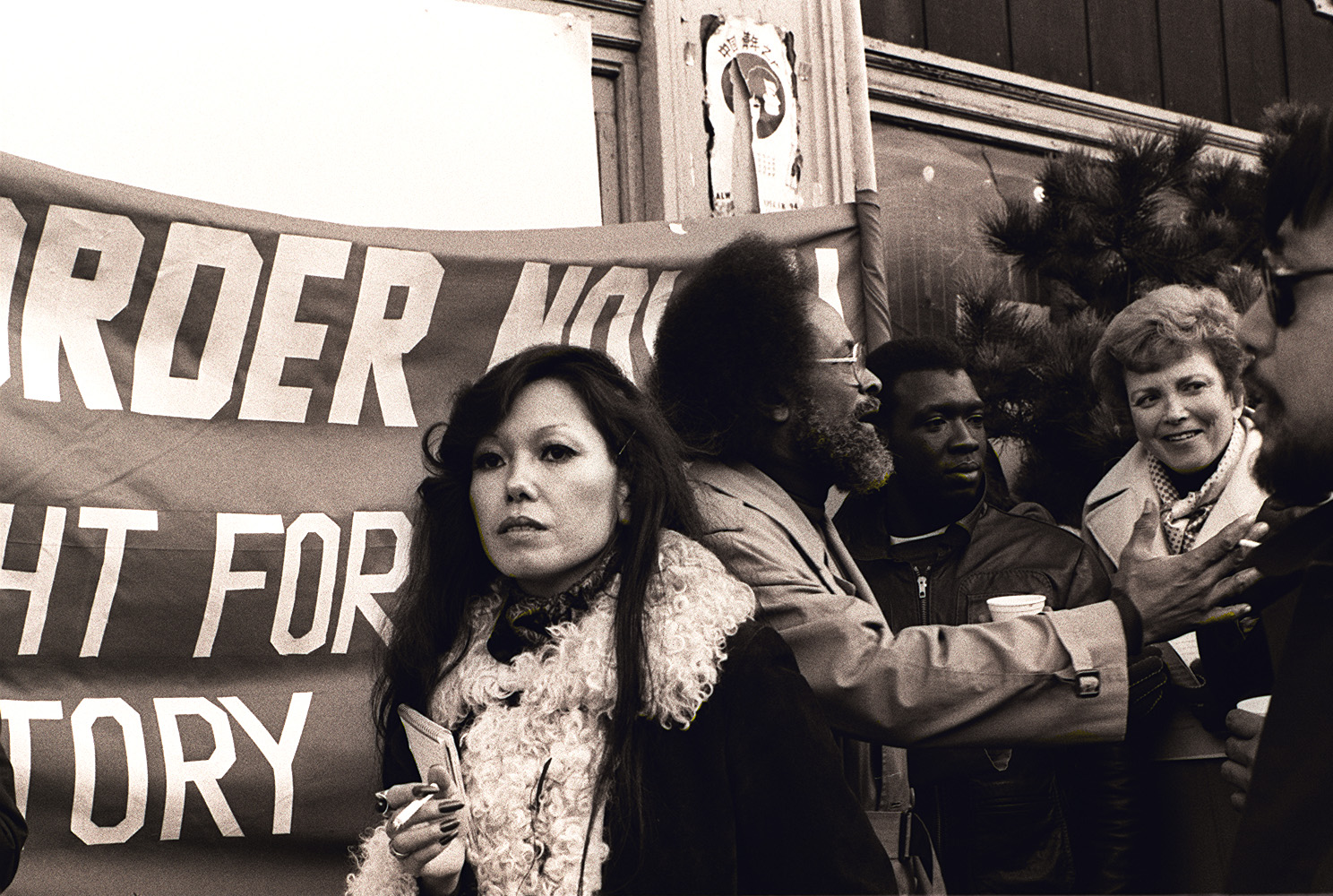
Church worker Janice Mirikitani and Rev. Williams at a protest of the demolition of the International Hotel. Supervisor Dorothy von Beroldingen is at right.

In the 1970s, church leaders and members protested the proposed demolition of the International Hotel. Williams was a prominent supporter of LGBTQ rights and supported leaders like Harvey Milk. Glide Church's Candidates Night and Citizen's Alert help the City of San Francisco recognize that LGBTQ individuals represented a major voting block.

In November 2020, Glide Church separated from its denomination, the United Methodist Church. The bishop of the Western Jurisdictional Conference of the United Methodist Church, Minerva G. Carcaño, had censured Glide Church after it was found not to be faithful to Methodist doctrine in its teaching and worship. Glide Church remained committed to supporting LGBTQ faith leaders and congregants; at the time of Glide Church's departure from the United Methodist Church, the denomination took a socially conservative stance on the issue.

In 2022, the Glide Foundation submitted plans for a $200 million redevelopment to replace its former women's dormitory at 300 Ellis Street with a new 10-story building and renovate the adjacent church building itself.

On November 10, 2022, the National Labor Relations Board held a union election by secret ballot at Glide Foundation's Ellis St building. 83 percent of Glide workers who participated in the election voted in support of the formation of a union, to be represented by the Office and Professional Employees International Union (OPEIU).

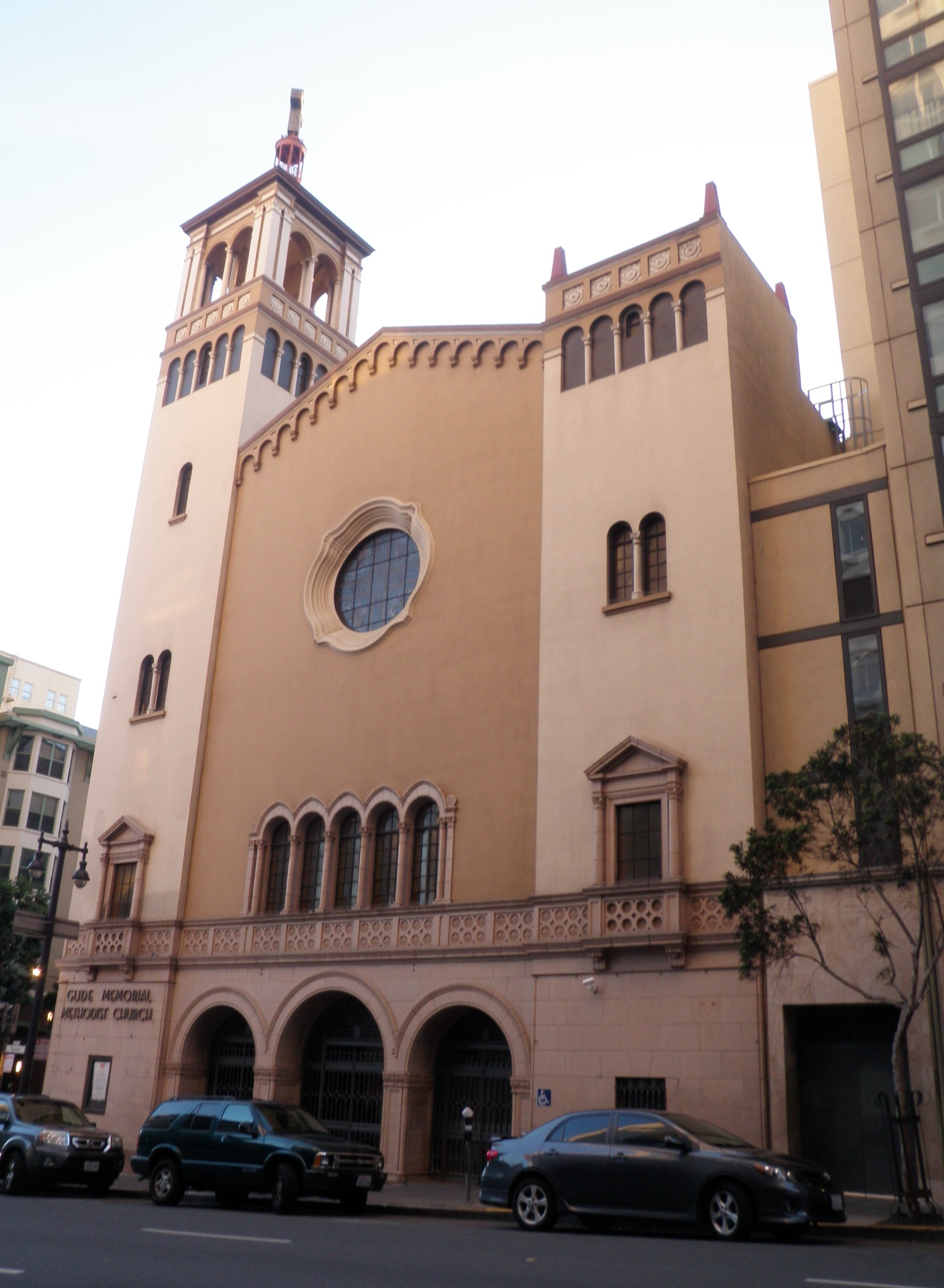
The church building seen from Taylor Street (in 2016, with the sign "Glide Memorial Methodist Church" predating the separation from the United Methodist Church)

=== Leadership ===
The Rev. Julian Claudius Mc Pheeters (also known as J. C. Mc Pheeters) was the first pastor at Glide Memorial Church, serving from 1931 until 1948.

The Rev. John R. Kenney served the congregation beginning in February 1950.

The Rev. John Moore, whose 1965 three-part sermon series on sexuality appeared on the front page of the San Francisco Chronicle, it provided the Christian perspectives on sexuality, which included advocating a more open attitude toward homosexual persons. In 1965, Moore was also a founding member of the Council on Religion and the Homosexual, a group that advocated for gay rights.

The Rev. Louis E. Durham was the President of Glide Foundation and Executive Minister of Glide Memorial Methodist Church from 1962 until 1972.

The Revs. Ted McIlvina, Cecil Williams and Donald Kuhns were hired in 1963. The Rev. Cecil Williams served with various titles at Glide Memorial Church from 1963 until 2023.

The Rev. Lloyd Wake, a Japanese American, started his service in 1963 on the Glide board where he served for many years as the president. He later became the Minister of Community Life and served the congregation for 23 years from 1967 to 1990 when he retired.

The Rev. Tony Ubalde, a Filipino pastor served as a Minister to the Asian Community from 1969 to 1971.

In the 1970s Rabbi Abraham Feinberg served for four years as Rabbi-in-Residence and had a radio show called Grey Lib that advocated for the rights of seniors.

The Rev. Douglass Fitch was named co-Pastor. In 2000, Rev. Fitch was appointed Pastor upon Williams' retirement and transition into the role of Glide Foundation's CEO. Fitch remained Glide's primary pastor until his 2006 retirement, at which time Williams was succeeded as CEO by Willa Seldon.

The Rev. Dr. Donald F. Guest was appointed senior pastor from 2006-2011, and the Rev. Dr. Karen Oliveto joined Glide as his co-pastor in 2008. In early 2010, Glide announced the resignation of CEO Willa Seldon, who agreed to continue in the position until a replacement was found.

In September 2010, Rita Shimmin and Kristen Growney Yamamoto were appointed Co-Executive Directors of Glide, replacing Executive Director Janice Mirikitani. Mirikitani, Williams' wife, continued in her role as Founding President.

In August 2012, Rev. Theon Johnson III was appointed as Associate Pastor. In June 2014, Rev. Angela Brown JD., was also appointed Associate Pastor.

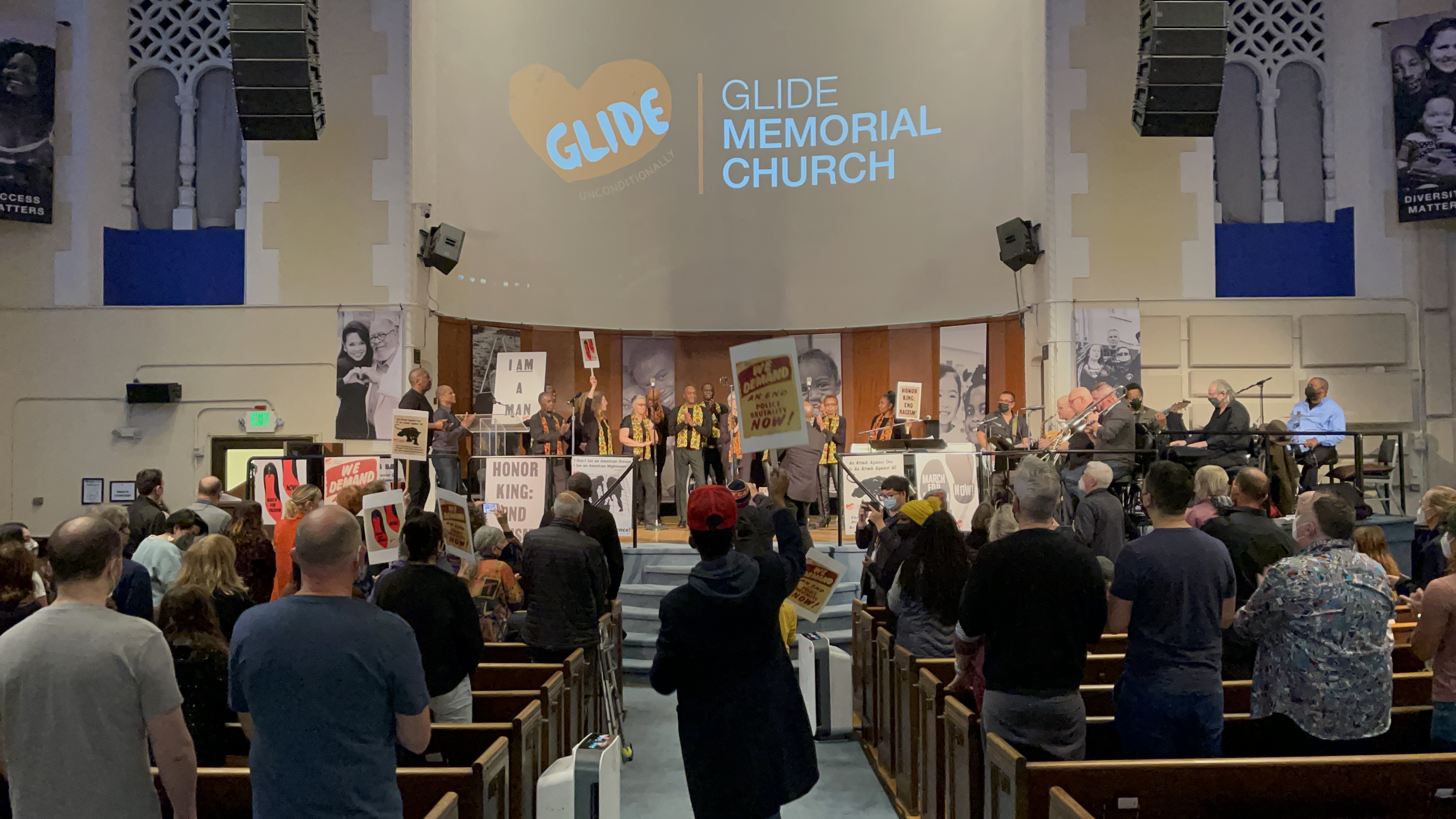
2023 Martin Luther King Jr Day Celebration at Glide Memorial Church

Senior Pastor, the Rev. Karen Oliveto left Glide after being elected bishop in July 2016. Bishop Warner H. Brown, Jr. served as Interim Senior Pastor for the following year.

Co-Executive Director Kristen Growney Yamamoto stepped down on June 30, 2016, when her family relocated to England. By that time, Glide had already begun a nationwide search for candidates to fill a new leadership role, that of Foundation President, which was to come into effect as Rev. Williams and Janice Mirikitani moved into part-time roles.

In 2017, Rabbi Michael Lezak began working as the director the Glide Foundation's Center for Social Justice and leads pilgrimages to Alabama that help create racial justice. In August, Karen J. Hanrahan became Glide Foundations' President and Chief Executive Officer, joining a leadership team that includes Executive Director Rita Shimmin, Co-Founders Cecil Williams and Janice Mirikitani, and Lead Pastor Rev. Jay Williams.

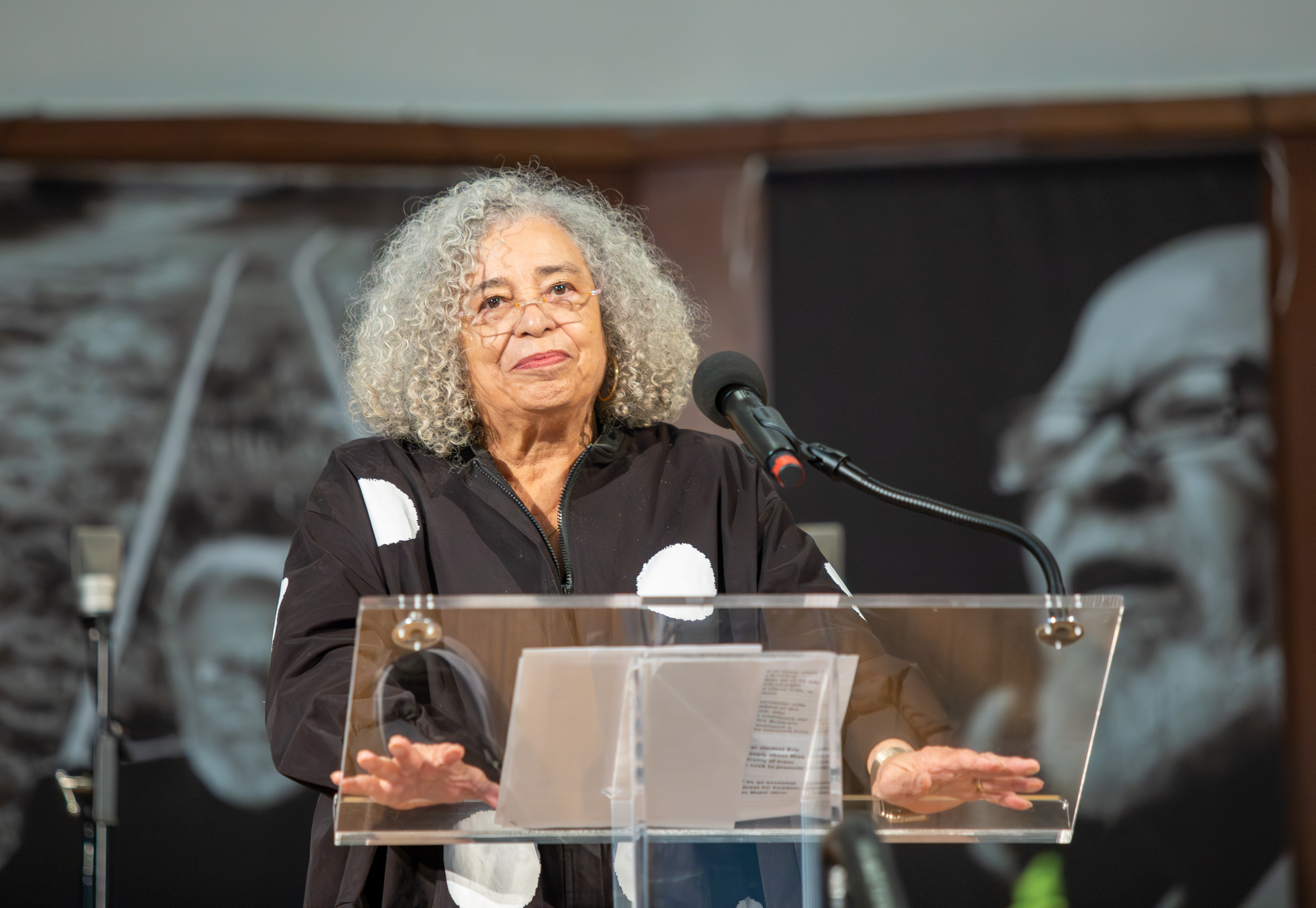
Angela Davis speaks at a memorial for Miss Major Griffin-Gracy in December 2025.

Without notice, the United Methodist Church removed all of its pastoral leadership from Glide Church on Father's Day of 2018. Minister Marvin K. White began preaching as an interim and was ultimately selected to become the Minister of Celebration. Marvin has authored several books, including Last Rights and Nothin' Ugly Fly, which were finalists for the Lambda Literary Award for Gay Men's Poetry. Glide Church has a board of directors that oversees its operations.

After its separation from the Methodists, Glide Memorial Church became a nondenominational church and launched its Mission, Vision, Values and Statement of Faith on Sunday August 6, 2023.

In October 2023, Dr. Gina Fromer became GLIDE's President and CEO. A former meal participant, Dr Fromer's Love Agenda seeks to expand Glide's reach and respond to the urgent needs of the homeless and hungry throughout San Francisco.

== Programs ==
Since the 1960s, Glide Church has provided various services for the poor and disenfranchised. The GLIDE Foundation currently runs 87 various social service programs. Through their Daily Free Meals program, Glide serves three meals daily, amounting to over 750,000 free meals a year (as of 2014).

They provided over 100,000 hours of licensed childcare and quality after-school programming to over 325 clients in 2007. They provided emergency supplies to 2,190 individuals in 2006. And they booked 5,707 shelter beds and helped 120 homeless persons move into permanent housing in 2007. As of 2022, Glide was serving 800,000 meals annually.

The church also provides HIV testing, mental and primary health care, women's programs, crisis intervention, an after-school program, creative arts and mentoring for youth, literacy classes, computer training, job skills training, drug and alcohol recovery programs, free legal services for the homeless, and housing with case management.

In 2024, the Cecil Williams Community Ambassador program was created, providing street level outreach to the homeless in the neighborhood.

== Music ==
=== Glide Ensemble ===
From about 1990–2000, the Glide Ensemble, the church's Gospel Choir, had about 100 members. The Glide Ensemble choir held its first rehearsals in 1969 and has been an integral part of Sunday Celebrations ever since. Directed by John F. Turk Jr. and Ron Sutherland and backed by a full band called the Change Band, the choir groups perform every Sunday at Glide's 9am and 11am Sunday Celebrations. From 2016-2024 the Glide Ensemble's music director was Vernon Bush. Zoe Ellis became the Director of Music Ministries in 2024 and is the first Jewish leader of the gospel choir. The Glide Ensemble has teamed up with a host of notable musicians such as Sammy Davis Jr., Leonard Bernstein, Marvin Gaye, Bono, Bobby McFerrin, Maya Angelou, Michael Franti, India Arie and Joan Baez.

In 2005, SF Weekly named the Glide Ensemble and Change Band "Best Gospel" in their annual "Best Of San Francisco" awards.

=== Discography ===
The Glide Ensemble and Change Band released at least nine albums which, prior to the 2020 pandemic, were sold on the first level of the church. All proceeds help fund Glide Foundation's various social service programs.

- John Turk's 30th Anniversary Concert (2010)
- The Real Sounds of the Glide Ensemble: Special Edition Anthology [4 CDs]
- Wings of Song: A Spiritual Flight (2009)
- Holidays with Real Soul (2007)
- A Salute to Ron Sutherland (2004)
- The Sounds of Hope (2001)
- Love to Give (1997)
- Coming Home to the Spirit (1994)
- Touch the Spirit (1991)

Podcasts of every Sunday celebration are available on Glide's website.

=== Youth and Children's Choirs ===
In the 90's Glide Ensemble Member Errin Mixon led a choir of teens and young adults that rehearses once a week and performs at services once a month. The Children's Choir sings during Sunday Celebrations several times a year.

== Funding ==
In the 1960s, Glide helped the Tenderloin become recognized as an Anti-Poverty District and was able to receive federal funding to support seniors, LGBTQ individuals and the homeless in the area.

In 1981, Glide began receiving subsidies from the city for its meals program. As of 2002, individual donations from Sunday mass contributed less than $640,000 of the foundation's $8.5 million revenue. Glide also obtains funding from other various fundraising activities such as their Annual Holiday Festival.

From 2000 to 2022, business magnate Warren Buffett raised over $34.2 million for Glide through an annual auction whose winner was invited to have lunch with him. In 2024, the Power of One auction was led by Marc Benioff and had raised more than $50 million.

== Notable actions ==
Glide became known for its views on issues such as same-sex marriage.

- Removing the cross inside the sanctuary at Glide.
- Helping form the Council on Religion and Homosexuality in 1964

== In popular culture ==
- Glibb Memorial Church in Armistead Maupin's book, Tales of the City is based on Glide.
- Glide Memorial Methodist Church was featured prominently in The Pursuit of Happyness in 2006.

== See also ==
- LGBT-affirming churches
- National Register of Historic Places listings in San Francisco
