= Hotel Californian (San Francisco, California) =

Historic building in San Francisco, US

- U.S. National Register of Historic Places
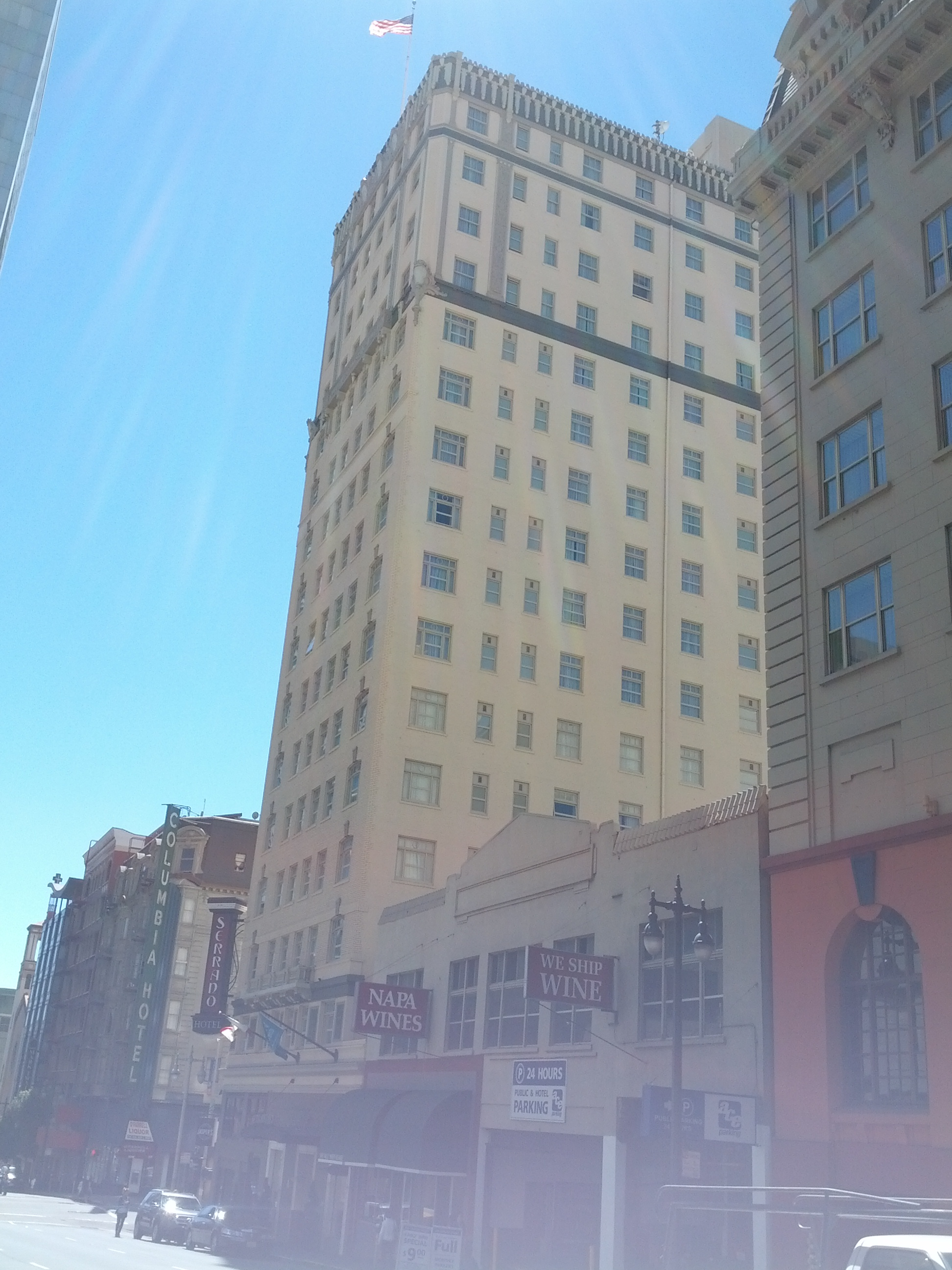
- The building as Serrano Hotel in 2012

- Location within San Francisco County Location within California Location within the United States
- Location: 403 Taylor Street, San Francisco, California, U.S.
- Coordinates: 37°47′10″N 122°24′42″W
- Architectural style: Art Deco, Mission Revival/Spanish Revival
- NRHP reference No.: 98001195
- Added to NRHP: September 25, 1998

The Spero Hotel, originally the Hotel Californian and later the Serrano Hotel, is a historic hotel building at 403 Taylor Street in the Tenderloin neighborhood of San Francisco, California. It was designed by architect Edward E. Young and built in 1923. A four story addition designed by Alfred Henry Jacobs was completed in 1929. The 12-story hotel is at 405 Taylor Street. It underwent a $16 million renovation and became the Spero Hotel in 2018. It is listed on the listed on the National Register of Historic Places in San Francisco, California since 1998; and it is a contributing property to the National Register of Historic Places's Uptown Tenderloin Historic District since 2009.

== History ==
The building was initially an upscale apartment hotel and was owned by former builder M. A. Little who operated it as a hostelry.

In 1935 the building was purchased by Lizzie Glide. Her husband was a stockman and after his death oil was discovered from his property allowing her to fund the Glide Foundation and carry out mission work including the Glide Memorial Methodist Church (two blocks from the Hotel Californian), a dormitory for Christian girls on the UC Berkeley campus, and a home for young Christian working women. From 1935 until 1978, the Hotel Californian was a temperance hotel.

Attendees at the 1938 NEA Convention stayed at the hotel and held a luncheon there.

== Architecture ==
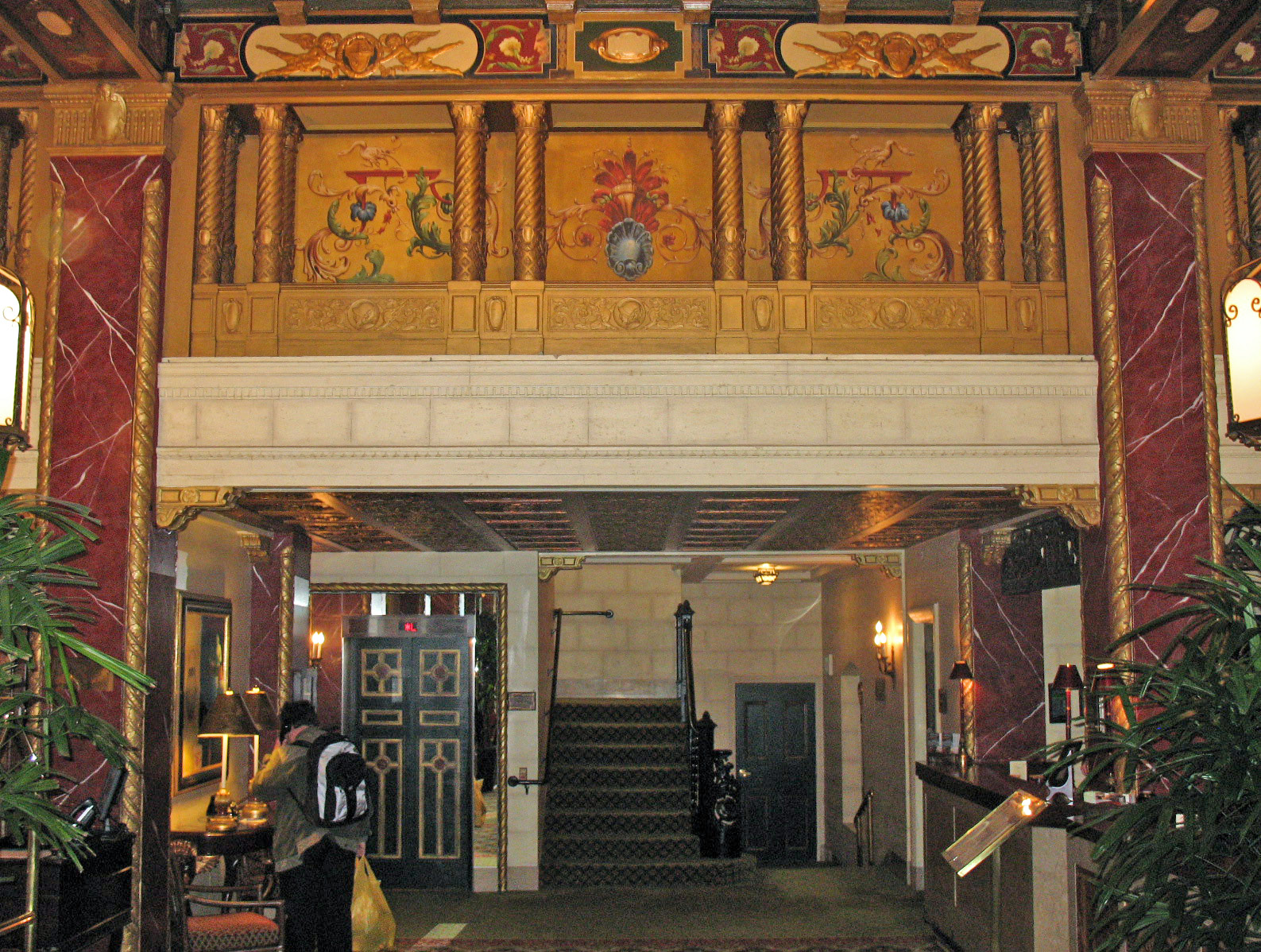
Lobby of the Hotel Serrano in 2008

The building's exterior was constructed in a Renaissance Revival architecture style while the lobby was designed with Spanish Colonial Revival architecture features. The four story addition by Jacobs was finished in 1929 where he added 100 more rooms, added marble to the common areas, and added Art Deco features to the building's facade. The exterior includes pressed metal panels, balconies, and elaborate cornice decoration. It also features marble floors. It included a coffee shop and soda fountain counter area, which is now a restaurant.

The lobby has columns with a twisting design and decorative ironwork. Ground floor retail spaces have evolved over the years while the upper floors have remained largely intact.
