= Scotia, California =

Scotia
- Census designated place
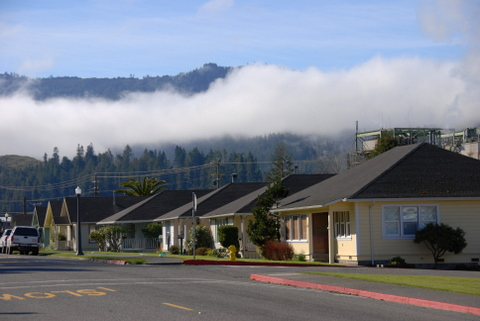
- Main Street in Scotia

- Location in California Scotia (the United States)
- Coordinates: 40°28′56″N 124°06′03″W
- Country: United States
- State: California
- County: Humboldt

Area
  - Total: 0.842 sq mi (2.180 km^{2})
  - Land: 0.746 sq mi (1.932 km^{2})
  - Water: 0.095 sq mi (0.247 km^{2}) 11.3%
- Elevation: 194 ft (59 m)

Population (2020)
  - Total: 681
  - Density: 913/sq mi (352/km^{2})
- Time zone: UTC-8 (Pacific)
  - Summer (DST): UTC-7 (PDT)
- ZIP code: 95565
- Area code: 707
- FIPS code: 06-70518
- GNIS feature IDs: 232715, 2611446
- Website: www.townofscotia.com

Scotia, formerly known as Forestville until 1888, is a census-designated place in Humboldt County, California, United States. It is located on the Eel River along U.S. Route 101, 8.5 miles (13.7 km) southeast of Fortuna and 244 miles (393 km) north of San Francisco. Scotia has a population of 681 (2020 census).

Scotia was a company town founded by the Pacific Lumber Company (PALCO) to house workers for the lumber industry. The town was entirely owned by PALCO until 2008, following the corporation's declaration of bankruptcy. While it is home to hundreds of past and present lumber mill employees and their dependents, a process is underway to divide the homes into lots for sale.

== History ==
Scotia was founded in 1863 as Forestville by the Pacific Lumber Company to house workers for its lumber industry operations in the area. The town was formed following the winter flood of 1861–1862; that flood level was not observed again until 1955. The Eel River crested at a gauge height of 72 feet (10.1 feet higher than 1955) on December 23, 1964. Eighteen-million board feet of redwood logs and 23-million board feet of lumber were washed out of the Scotia sawmill and scattered along the lower river and Pacific coast to the mouth of the Columbia River.

The Humboldt Bay and Eel River Railroad built to connect to The Pacific Lumber Company Railroad at Alton to the town of Scotia on August 20, 1885. This railway became part of Atchison, Topeka and Santa Fe Railway subsidiary San Francisco and Northwestern Railway in 1903, and was linked to the national rail network by completion of the Northwestern Pacific Railroad in 1914.

Forestville was renamed 25 years later in 1888 to prevent confusion with a community in Sonoma County of the same name. It is said that the new name was chosen because it was populated by many residents originated from New Brunswick and Nova Scotia (Canada), and that the name Scotia was chosen by a coin toss, with the alternative being Brunswick. The first post office in the town opened the same year.

Life in early 20th century Scotia is documented by the Neill Photo Albums, which feature 292 photographs of the Neill family, townspeople, and daily life in the company town. Images reflect everyday life and hardships, local residents and homes, vacations, trips into the surrounding forest, and Pacific Lumber Company's mill and work operations, between the years of 1908 and 1913. The Neil Photo Album is available for viewing at library of Humboldt State Polytechnic University's Special Collections. During the mid-to-late 19th century, Scotia was one of numerous company towns established across the Pacific Northwest, many of which closed during the Great Depression in the 1930s. Scotia was one of the handful of company towns to survive this period and further into the 20th century. Most of the existing houses were built between the 1920s and 1950s.

The 1992 Cape Mendocino earthquakes caused widespread damage in Humboldt County, including Scotia, when three major earthquakes occurred in less than a 24-hour span. The first was a magnitude 7.2 quake at 11:06 a.m. on April 25, causing mill damage that took months to repair. The second quake, a 6.5, at 12:41 a.m. on April 26, caused the most damage. A fire started in the Hoby's Market shopping center exploded, with firefighters trying to extinguish the fire the rest of the night, but the entire shopping center was destroyed. The earthquake also caused extensive damage to the North Court area of Scotia, with numerous homes damaged and gas leakages from a damaged gas line. Pacific Gas & Electric responded to repair the gas line in North Court while all the residents were gathered on a grassy hill for the entire night. The third quake at 4:26 a.m. on April 26, measuring 6.7, compounded damage from the previous two quakes. Scotia was temporarily without water and electricity. PALCO rebuilt the shopping center that had been destroyed.

=== PALCO bankruptcy ===
PALCO announced in 2006 a desire to sell the homes (to the employees and retirees who lived there) and commercial property. The company suggested that Scotia become part of Rio Dell, a small neighboring town located directly across the Eel River. Additionally, the need for employees at the lumber mill had fallen from over 1,000 to around 300, due in part to automation and a shortage of timber.

On January 18, 2007, PALCO filed for bankruptcy protection under Chapter 11, Title 11, United States Code. On July 8, 2008, the court issued its judgment and order confirming the Plan of Reorganization submitted by secured creditor Marathon Structured Finance Fund (Marathon), joined by Mendocino Redwood Company (MRC). Pursuant to that plan, most of the Town of Scotia's real and personal assets transferred to a reorganized entity wholly owned by Marathon, Town of Scotia Company, LLC (TOS). Under the plan, the active Scotia sawmill facilities and other ancillary office buildings were to be transferred to a second reorganized entity, Humboldt Redwood Company (HRC) in which Marathon and MRC both have interests (United States Bankruptcy Court for the Southern District of Texas, Corpus Christi Division as "Case No. 07-20027-C-11" under the consolidated title "In Re Scotia Development LLC, et al., Debtors"). As of 2025, the sawmill is owned by the Humboldt Sawmill Company.

The Town of Scotia LLC has pursued a General Plan Amendment/ Zone Reclassification and Final Map Subdivision application. Subdivision requires fulfillment of conditions of approval which include formation of a community services district or other public entity to manage utilities. Service district formation requires approval by the Humboldt County Local Agency Formation Commission, which has a pending application. The purpose of the subdivision is to create individual parcels for existing residential and commercial properties, and public facilities. The proposed subdivision would allow for the sale of residential and commercial lots (all of which are currently owned and operated by the Town of Scotia LLC) to individual property owners.

== Infrastructure ==
Offerings includes the following: a movie theater, a museum and a hotel with the town's only bar and restaurant, a new shopping center, a school through eighth grade, a community recreation center, a baseball field and two churches. PALCO operated the town on a $1 million annual budget. Available housing consists of 274 two- to four-bedroom wood-frame cottages. The 28-person volunteer fire department is fully funded by PALCO.

PALCO's infrastructure in town also included the electrical distribution system. The Scotia distribution system was the very last one in the state to use color-coded crossarms on the utility system. Red arms are for low-voltage service to the houses and buildings, yellow arms are for 2,400-volt primary distribution, and blue designates the Pacific Gas & Electric interconnection. As part of the process of subdividing the town, PG&E has constructed a new distribution system (built to the California Public Utilities Commission's current specifications) to serve those portions of the town no longer under the company's control.

A biomass energy plant attached to the city's sawmill generates energy by burning wood waste from the mill. This mill provides 20% of the energy for the Redwood Coast Energy Authority (RCEA), a joint powers agency of the County of Humboldt, the seven cities within the county, the Yurok Tribe, and the Humboldt Bay Municipal Water District. Local environmental organizations are pressuring RCEA to not renew its contract with the plant in 2031 over air quality and climate change concerns.

== Demographics ==
Historical population
Census	Pop.	Note	%±
2010	850		—
2020	681		−19.9%
U.S. Decennial Census; 1860–1870 1880-1890; 1900 1910 1920; 1930 1940 1950; 1960 1970 1980; 1990 2000 2010

Scotia first appeared as a census designated place in the 2010 U.S. census.

The 2020 United States census reported that Scotia had a population of 681. The population density was 912.9 inhabitants per square mile (352.5/km^{2}). The racial makeup of Scotia was 474 (69.6%) White, 7 (1.0%) African American, 27 (4.0%) Native American, 5 (0.7%) Asian, 2 (0.3%) Pacific Islander, 39 (5.7%) from other races, and 127 (18.6%) from two or more races. Hispanic or Latino of any race were 128 persons (18.8%).

The census reported that 677 people (99.4% of the population) lived in households, 4 (0.6%) lived in non-institutionalized group quarters, and no one was institutionalized.

There were 226 households, out of which 85 (37.6%) had children under the age of 18 living in them, 98 (43.4%) were married-couple households, 31 (13.7%) were cohabiting couple households, 45 (19.9%) had a female householder with no partner present, and 52 (23.0%) had a male householder with no partner present. 45 households (19.9%) were one person, and 16 (7.1%) were one person aged 65 or older. The average household size was 3.0. There were 152 families (67.3% of all households).

The age distribution was 222 people (32.6%) under the age of 18, 45 people (6.6%) aged 18 to 24, 203 people (29.8%) aged 25 to 44, 150 people (22.0%) aged 45 to 64, and 61 people (9.0%) who were 65 years of age or older. The median age was 30.9 years. For every 100 females, there were 112.8 males.

There were 276 housing units at an average density of 370.0 units per square mile (142.9 units/km^{2}), of which 226 (81.9%) were occupied. Of these, 86 (38.1%) were owner-occupied, and 140 (61.9%) were occupied by renters.

== Visitor attractions ==
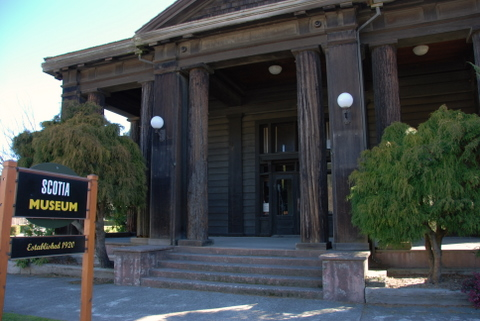
Scotia Museum

The Scotia Museum contains artifacts, photographs, and exhibits. The Fisheries Center allows visitors to view various types of the area's native fish and experience a setting that is remarkably similar to their natural environment.

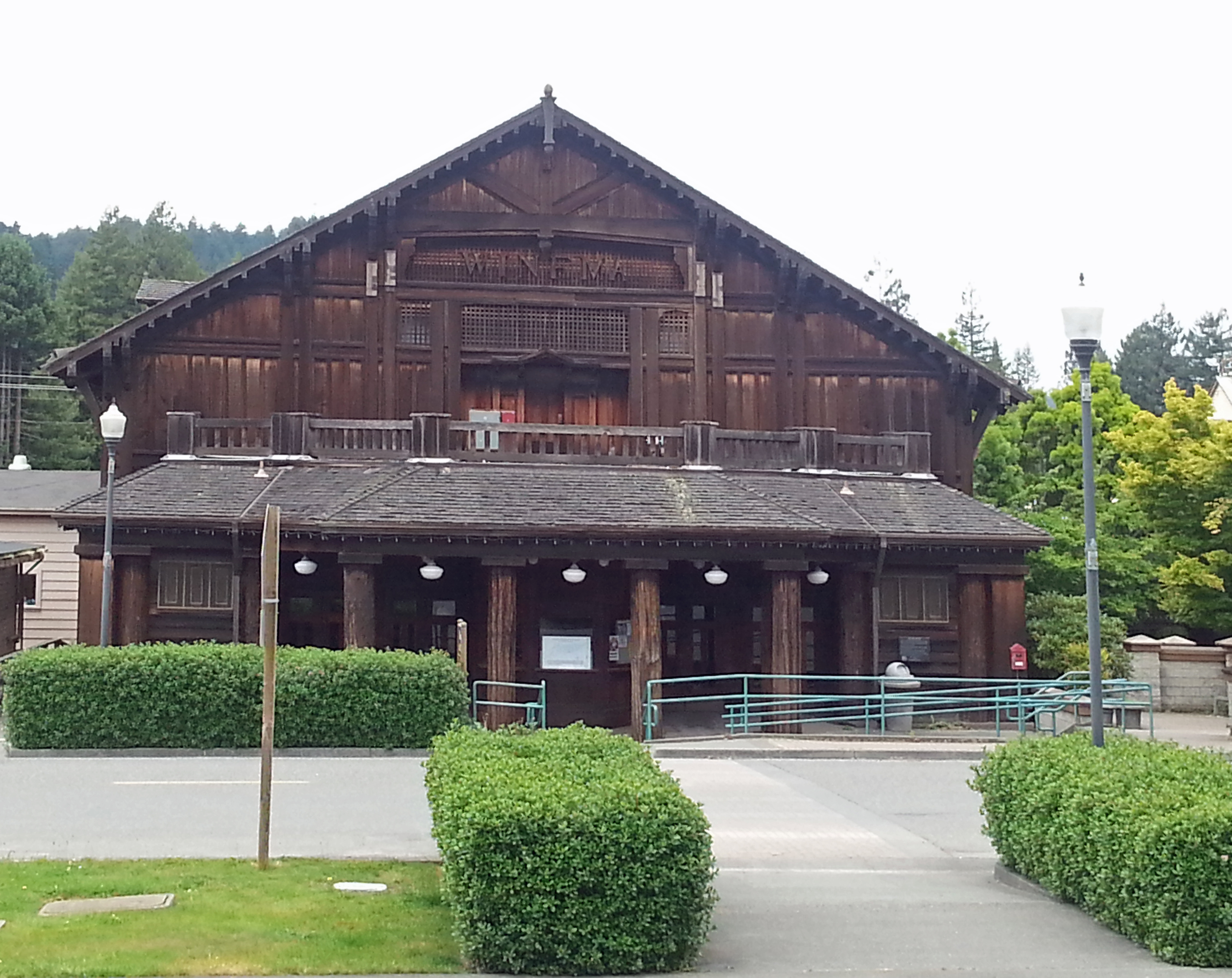
Winema Theater in 2017

The Winema Theater, built in 1919 according to designs by Alfred Henry Jacobs, was renovated in 2002. The redwood structure's design evokes a Tyrolean Swiss chalet with exposed wooden beams.

== Appearances in popular culture ==
Scotia is featured in California's Gold Episode 7002 with Huell Howser.

== Politics ==
In the state legislature, Scotia is in the 2nd senatorial district, represented by Democrat Mike McGuire, and the 2nd Assembly district, represented by Democrat Chris Rogers.

Federally, Scotia is in California's 2nd congressional district, represented by Democrat Jared Huffman.

== Climate ==
Scotia has a warm-summer Mediterranean climate (Csb) according to the Köppen climate classification system. Being in a river valley sheltered from some coastal moderation, the all-time record high of 104 °F (40 °C) in September 2017 is a lot warmer than coastal Humboldt County. It was a full 9 °F (5.0 °C) warmer than the previous all-time record. The record cold measured in Scotia was 17 °F (−8 °C) with strong inversion from the surrounding hills in winter being infrequent.

Scotia has not had an ice day since records began in 1926 with the lowest daily maximum being 33 °F (1 °C) in 1990. During the normals between 1991 and 2020, the coldest average daily high was at 45 °F (7 °C). The moderate and foggy Pacific summer air cools down the nights in that season. The warmest low on record was 67 °F (19 °C) in September 1939 and the warmest low in a normal year is a mild 62 °F (17 °C).

Climate data for Scotia, California (1991–2020 normals, extremes 1926–present)
Month	Jan	Feb	Mar	Apr	May	Jun	Jul	Aug	Sep	Oct	Nov	Dec	Year
Record high °F (°C)	76 (24)	82 (28)	86 (30)	92 (33)	97 (36)	94 (34)	90 (32)	93 (34)	104 (40)	97 (36)	81 (27)	73 (23)	104 (40)
Mean maximum °F (°C)	66.6 (19.2)	71.1 (21.7)	72.3 (22.4)	76.3 (24.6)	78.2 (25.7)	79.2 (26.2)	80.1 (26.7)	82.6 (28.1)	86.3 (30.2)	85.1 (29.5)	73.1 (22.8)	64.8 (18.2)	90.5 (32.5)
Mean daily maximum °F (°C)	56.6 (13.7)	57.8 (14.3)	59.2 (15.1)	61.6 (16.4)	64.4 (18.0)	67.2 (19.6)	70.0 (21.1)	71.6 (22.0)	72.5 (22.5)	68.6 (20.3)	60.6 (15.9)	55.1 (12.8)	63.8 (17.7)
Daily mean °F (°C)	49.6 (9.8)	50.3 (10.2)	51.4 (10.8)	53.4 (11.9)	56.5 (13.6)	59.3 (15.2)	61.8 (16.6)	62.9 (17.2)	62.2 (16.8)	58.4 (14.7)	52.7 (11.5)	48.3 (9.1)	55.6 (13.1)
Mean daily minimum °F (°C)	42.6 (5.9)	42.7 (5.9)	43.5 (6.4)	45.2 (7.3)	48.6 (9.2)	51.4 (10.8)	53.5 (11.9)	54.2 (12.3)	51.9 (11.1)	48.3 (9.1)	44.9 (7.2)	41.6 (5.3)	47.4 (8.6)
Mean minimum °F (°C)	32.3 (0.2)	33.3 (0.7)	35.5 (1.9)	37.6 (3.1)	41.9 (5.5)	45.3 (7.4)	48.8 (9.3)	48.8 (9.3)	44.7 (7.1)	39.2 (4.0)	34.8 (1.6)	32.2 (0.1)	29.8 (−1.2)
Record low °F (°C)	20 (−7)	23 (−5)	29 (−2)	31 (−1)	33 (1)	40 (4)	40 (4)	41 (5)	37 (3)	28 (−2)	27 (−3)	17 (−8)	17 (−8)
Average precipitation inches (mm)	8.59 (218)	7.83 (199)	6.93 (176)	3.89 (99)	1.91 (49)	0.57 (14)	0.14 (3.6)	0.05 (1.3)	0.47 (12)	2.38 (60)	5.23 (133)	9.68 (246)	47.67 (1,211)
Average precipitation days	17.2	15.1	16.8	14.0	9.7	5.0	1.9	1.4	2.9	7.1	13.9	17.6	122.6
Source: NOAA

== Plane crash ==
On June 19, 1977, a Rockwell Commander plane piloted by Norman Wascher crashed in woods near Scotia, not long after takeoff from Murray Field in Eureka, bound for Oxnard. His wife, Beverly, was the only other person on board. The plane was not found until 1996, nineteen years later, and the couple's bodies were not found until 2005, 28 years after the incident. Robin Lee Wascher, one of the couple's three daughters, was the air traffic controller on duty during the 1991 Los Angeles airport runway collision.

== See also ==
- Northwestern Pacific Railroad
- Scotia, New York
