= Alfred Henry Jacobs =

American architect

- Born: 1882; San Francisco, California, U.S.
- Died: December 14, 1954 (aged 71–72)
- Education: Mark Hopkins Art Institute, École des Beaux Arts
- Alma mater: University of California, Berkeley, Massachusetts Institute of Technology
- Occupation: Architect
- Spouse: Lillian Wollenberg

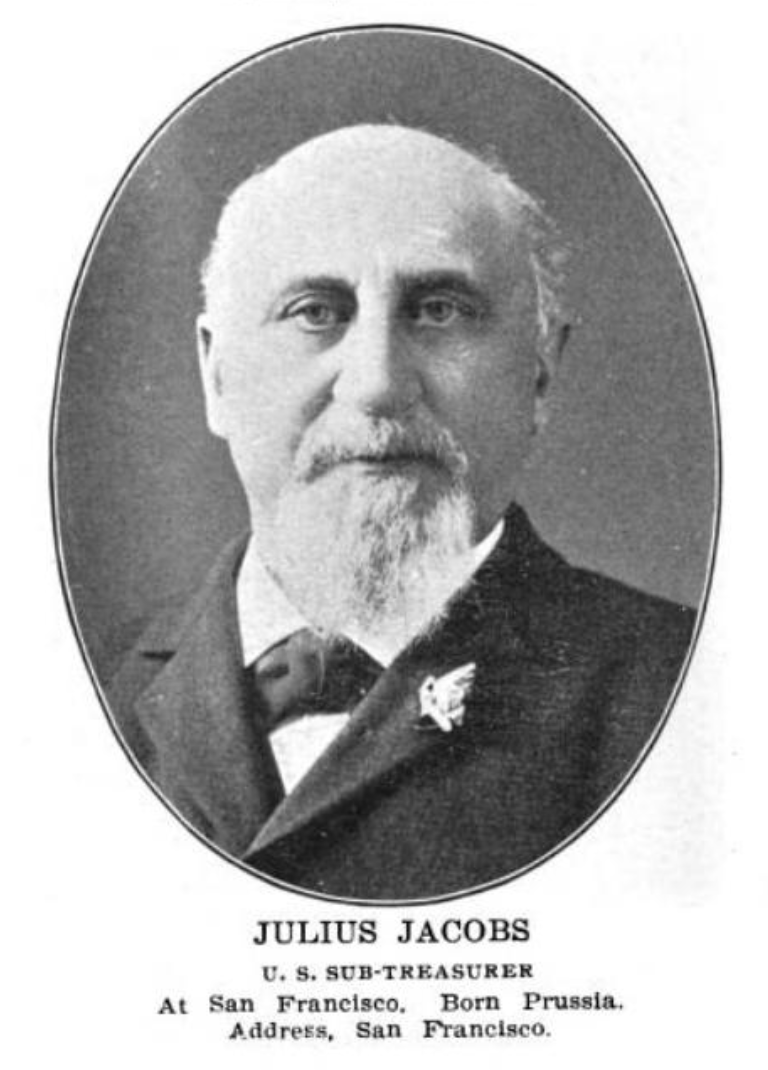
Alfred Henry Jacobs's father Julius Jacobs

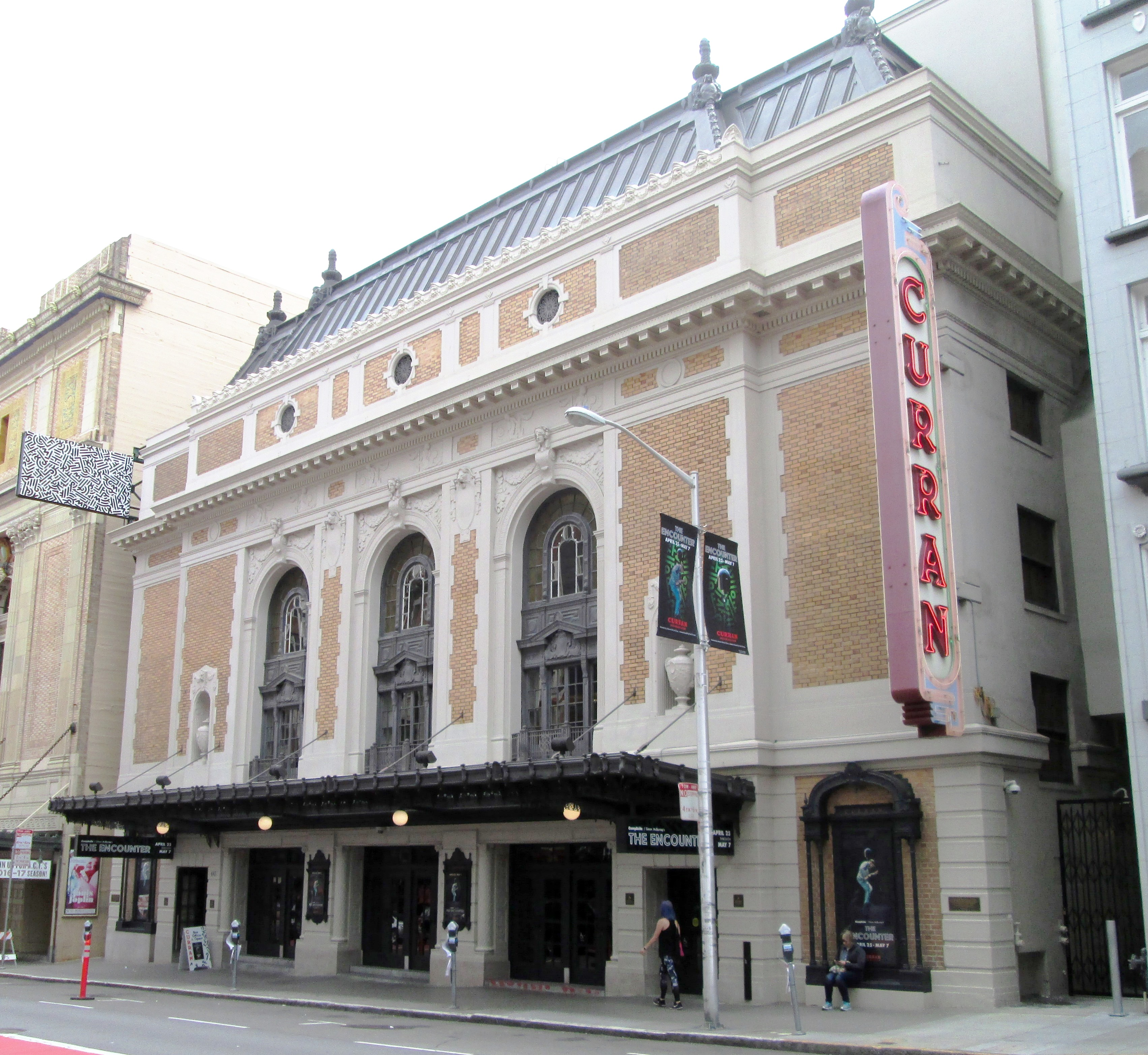
Curran Theatre, 445 Geary Street

Alfred Henry Jacobs (1882 – December 14, 1954) was an American architect. He designed theaters, hotels, residential, and religious buildings, primarily working in the San Francisco Bay Area. Three of the buildings he designed are listed on the National Register of Historic Places. He also worked as a watercolorist.

== Early life and education ==
Alfred Henry Jacobs was born in 1882 in San Francisco, California to Julius and Sarah Adler Jacobs. His father Julius Jacobs was born in Prussia in 1840 and immigrated to California in 1853. In 1898 he was appointed Assistant U.S. Treasurer, in charge of the Sub-Treasury in San Francisco. He was Jewish. He graduated high school from the California School of Mechanical Arts (now Lick-Wilmerding High School).

Jacobs studied fine art at Mark Hopkins Art Institute (later known as San Francisco Art Institute) from 1897 until 1899. This was followed by mechanical engineering studies at the University of California, Berkeley where he graduated in 1903; and Massachusetts Institute of Technology where he received a B.S. degree in architecture in 1904 and an M.S. degree in architecture in 1905. He did further studies at the École des Beaux Arts in Paris.

He married Lillian Wollenberg in 1908.

== Career ==
Back in San Francisco by 1907, he partnered with Walter Ratcliff and helped design the Berkeley Tennis Club (1908) in Berkeley, California. In 1909, he joined San Francisco's Fidelity Lodge, Number 120, Free and Accepted Masons of California and established his own firm.

Jacobs gained emeritus membership status with the American Institute of Architects.

== Death and legacy ==
He died on December 14, 1954. The Magnes Collection of Jewish Art and Life at the University of California, Berkeley has a collection of his papers, drawings, and photographs.

In August 2003 to January 2004, a solo exhibition titled "Alfred Henry Jacobs" at the Judah L. Magnes Museum (now known as the Magnes Collection of Jewish Art and Life at U.C. Berkeley) was held featuring his architectural drawings and related documents, his fine artwork, and photographs.

== Work ==
- Berkeley Tennis Club (1908), 2624 Hillegass Avenue, Berkeley, California; now a private home
- Religious school house for Congregation Emanu-El (1910), 1337 Sutter Street, San Francisco, California; NRHP–listed; later known as the Grabhorn Press building
- Herald Hotel (1910), 308 Eddy Street, San Francisco, California; part of the NRHP–listed Uptown Tenderloin Historic District
- 1244–1268 Sutter Street (1911), commercial building in Polk Gulch, San Francisco, California; later known as the Avalon Ballroom
- Jacobs family's residence (1915), 80-21st Avenue, San Francisco, California
- California Theatre (1916), 787–799 Market Street, San Francisco, California; renamed the State Theatre, and torn down in 1954
- Winema Theater (1920), Main Street, Scotia, California; made with redwood lumber.
- Granada Theater (1920–1921), 1066 Market Street, San Francisco, California; renamed the Paramount Theatre, dismantled in 1965
- Homewood Terrace (1920–1921) Pacific Hebrew Orphan Asylum and Home Society, San Francisco, California
- Curran Theatre (1921–1922), 445 Geary Street, San Francisco, California
- Ansel Adams childhood home (1929), 129-24th Avenue, San Francisco, California
- Hotel Californian (1929; addition-only), 403 Taylor Street, San Francisco, California
- Butterfield and Butterfield Auctioneer building, San Francisco, California
- Memorial for the Pacific Hebrew Orphan Asylum at the Home of Peace Cemetery, Colma, California
- Pacific Hebrew Orphanage, North Ocean Boulevard, San Francisco, California; a Jewish orphanage now demolished
Jacob's designs

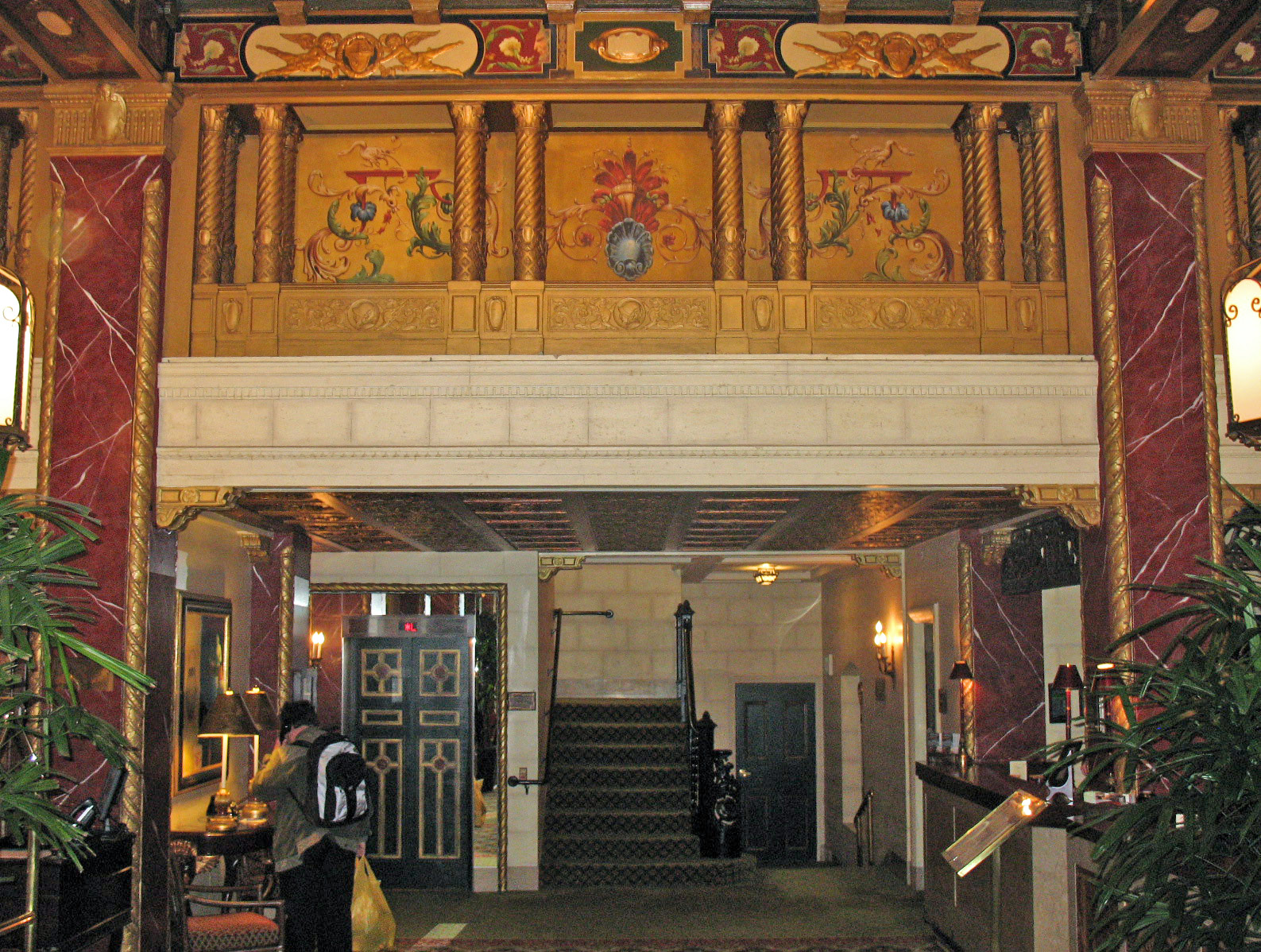
Hotel Spero (formerly the Hotel Californian), 403 Taylor Street, entry

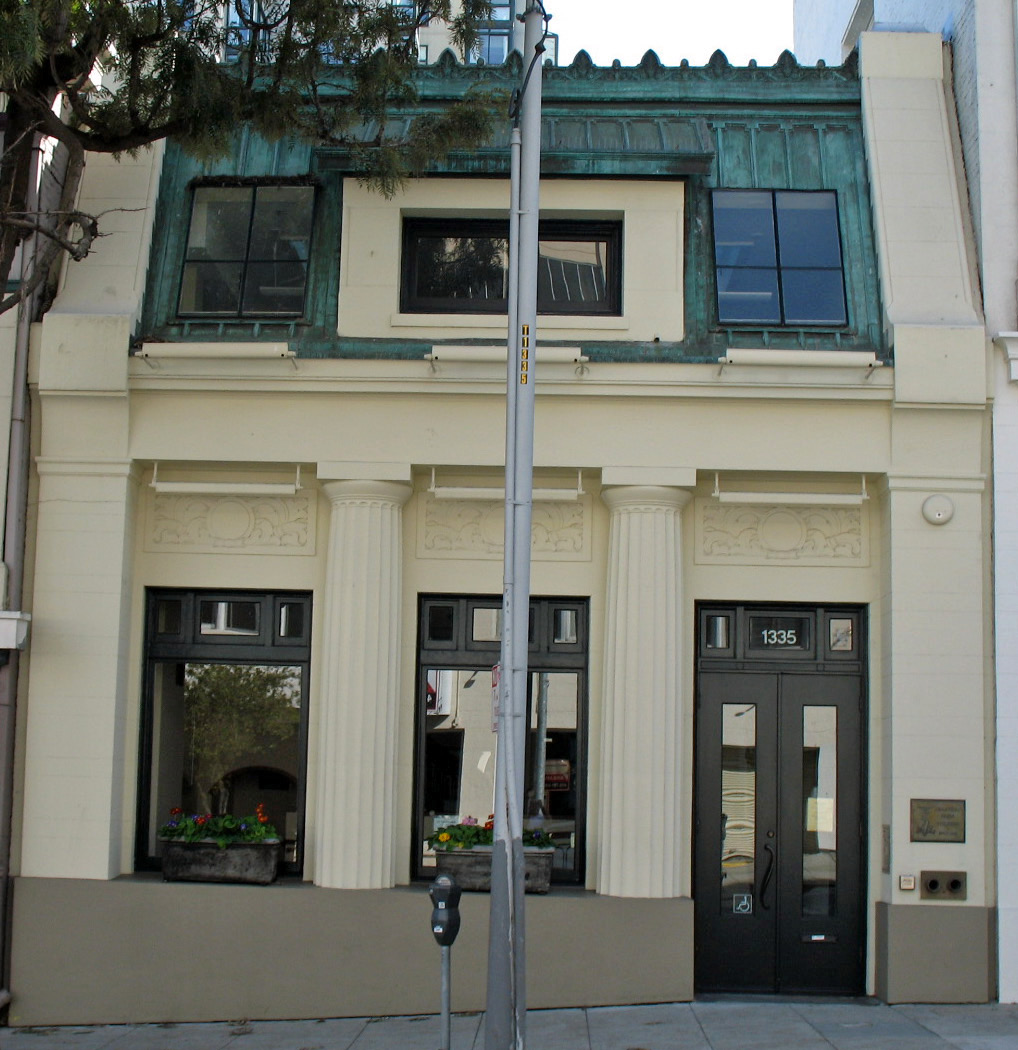
Former Grabhorn Press building, 1337 Sutter Street

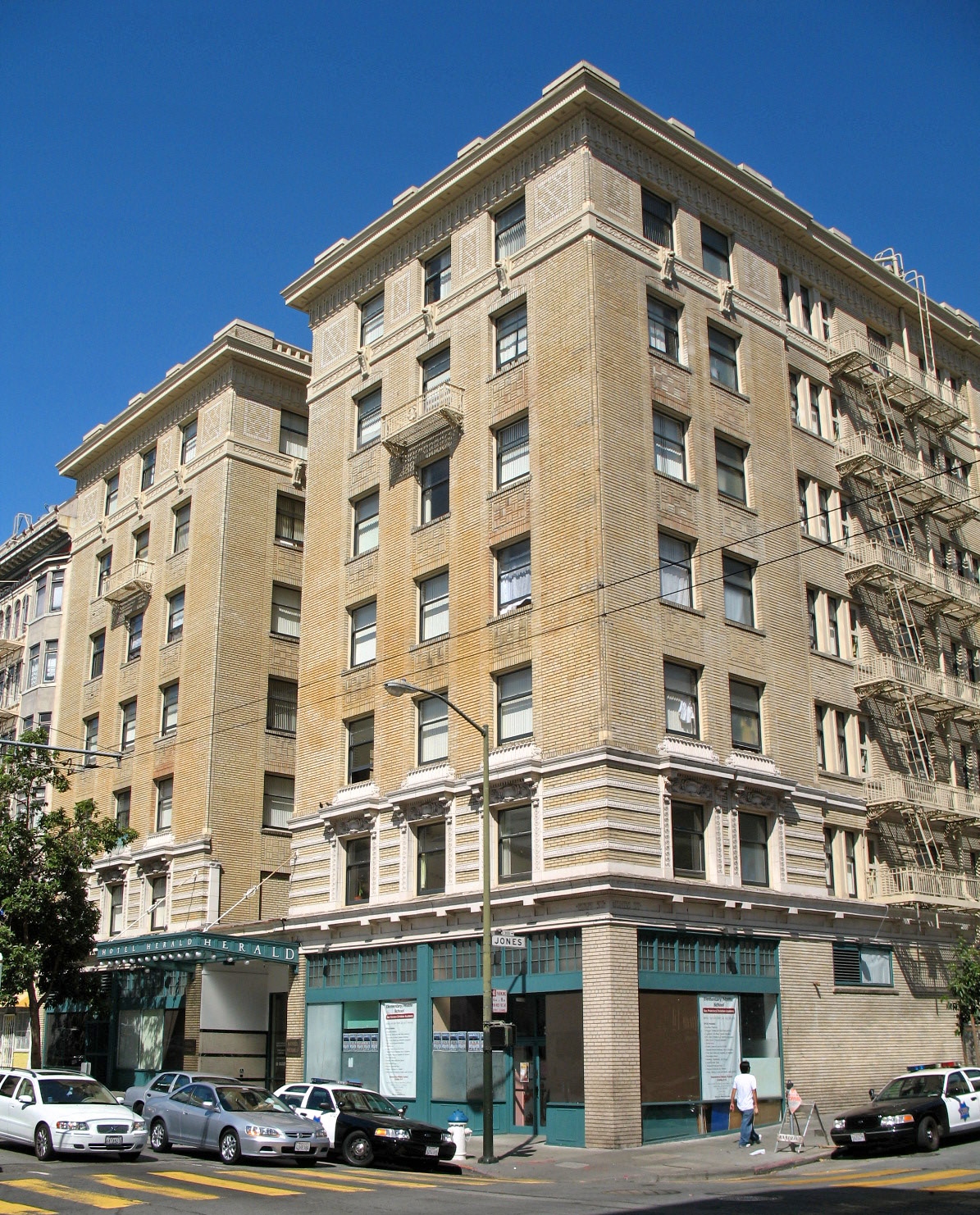
Herald Hotel, 308 Eddy Street

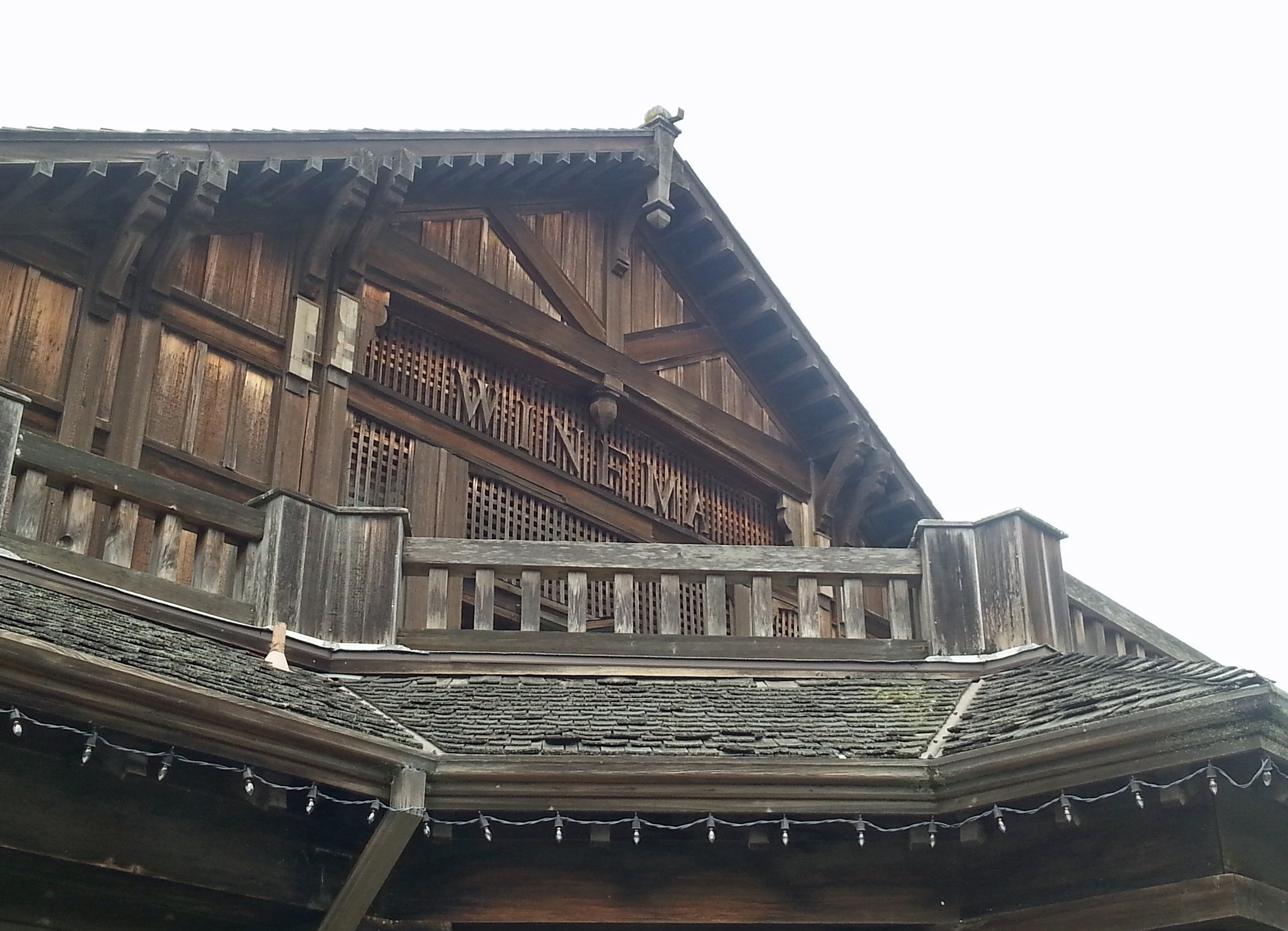
Winema Theater roofline and signage

== See also ==
- Albert Pissis
- Sylvain Schnaittacher
