= Cecil Williams (pastor) =

American Methodist minister (1929–2024)

The Reverend Cecil Williams
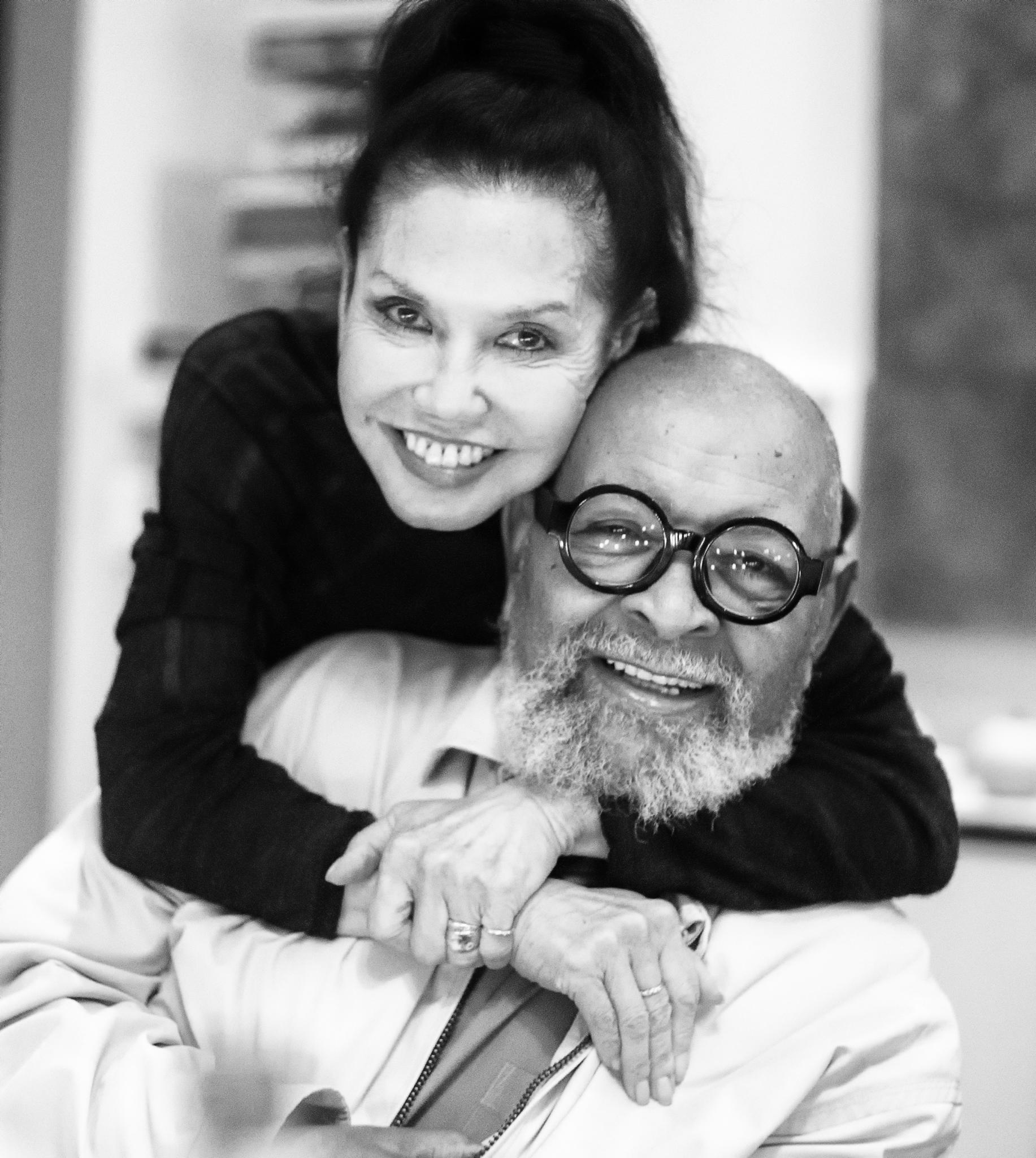
- Williams and his wife Janice Mirikitani
- Born: Albert Cecil Williams; September 22, 1929; San Angelo, Texas, U.S.
- Died: April 22, 2024 (aged 94); San Francisco, California, U.S.
- Education: B.A. (Sociology), Huston–Tillotson University (1952); ThM, Perkins School of Theology at Southern Methodist University (1955)
- Occupations: Evangelist, activist, community leader, author
- Spouses: Evelyn Robinson (m. 1956; div. 1976) Janice Mirikitani (m. 1982; died 2021)
- Children: 2 (with Robinson)

Albert Cecil Williams (September 22, 1929 – April 22, 2024) was an American pastor, civil and LGBT rights activist, community leader, and author who was the pastor of Glide Memorial Church in San Francisco.

He was one of the first five African-American graduates of the Perkins School of Theology at Southern Methodist University. Subsequently, he hosted political rallies, which drew in very diverse key speakers as result of the events' inclusive and inviting nature. Drawing on his experiences in the civil rights movement, Williams was also one of the first African-Americans to become involved in the gay rights movement.

Under his leadership, Glide Memorial became a diverse 10,000-member congregation of all races, ages, genders, ethnicities, and sexual orientations. To this day, it is the largest provider of social services in San Francisco.

== Early life ==
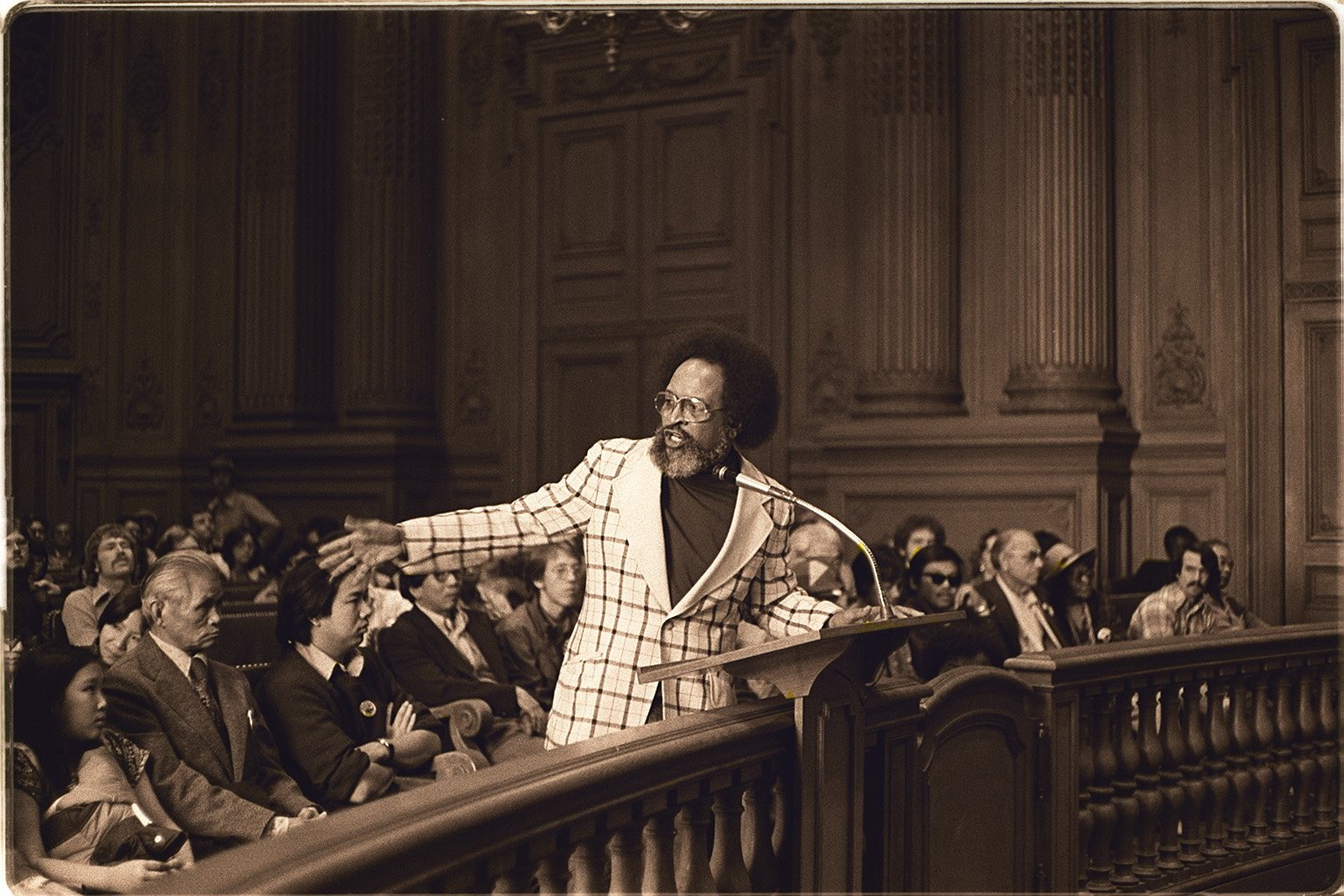
Williams speaking in San Francisco's Board of Supervisors chambers in support of the International Hotel tenants.

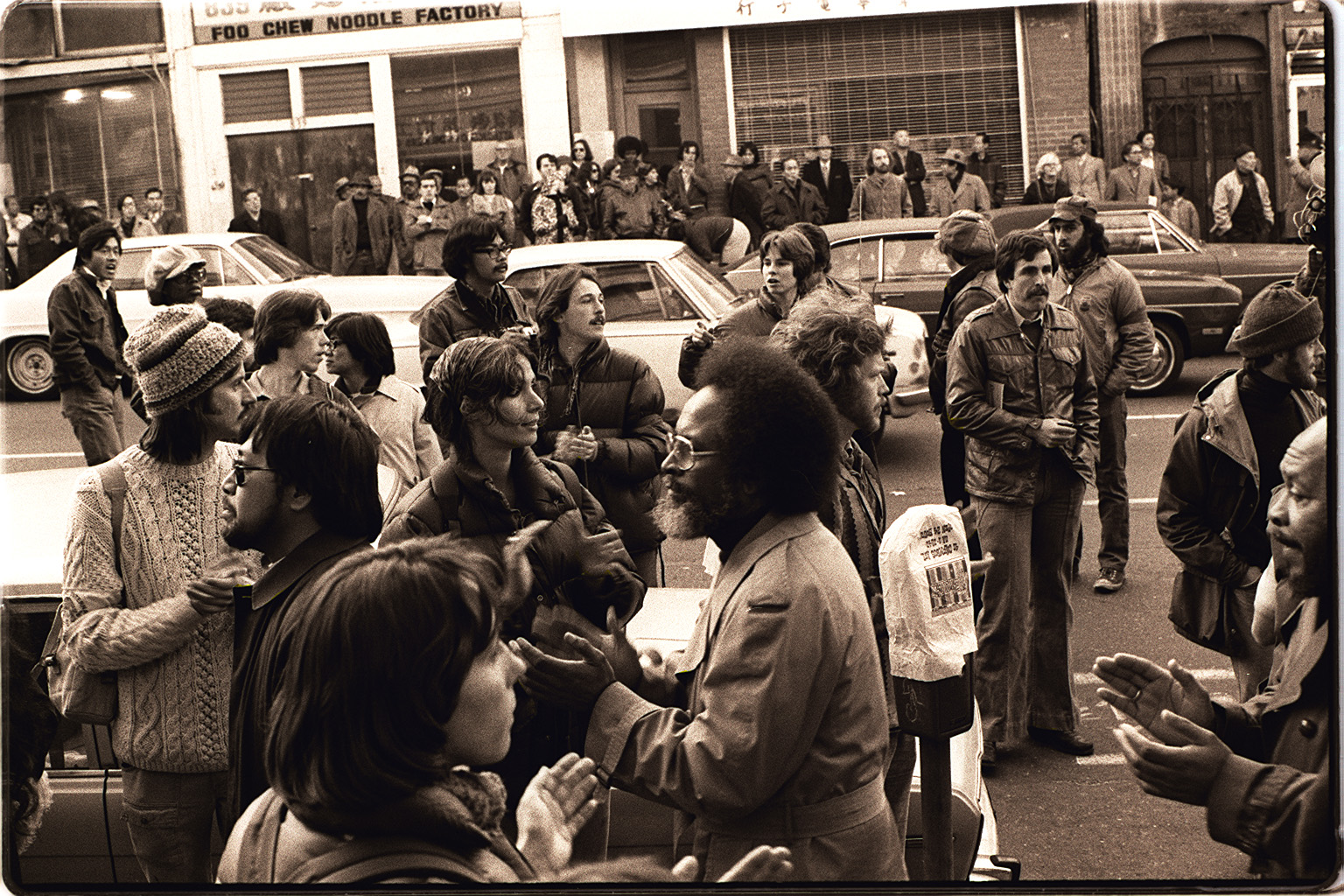
Williams walking south on Kearny Street at the January 1977 protest

One of six children, Williams was born in San Angelo, Texas, to Earl Williams Sr. He had four brothers, Earl Jr., Reedy, Claudius "Dusty", Jack and a sister, Johnny.

Williams received a Bachelor of Arts degree in sociology from Huston–Tillotson University in 1952. He was one of the first five African-American graduates of the Perkins School of Theology at Southern Methodist University in 1955. He became the pastor of Glide Memorial Church in San Francisco, California in 1963, and founded the Council on Religion and the Homosexual the following year. He welcomed everyone to participate in services and hosted political rallies in which Angela Davis and the Black Panthers spoke and lectures were given by personalities as diverse as Bill Cosby and Billy Graham. When Patty Hearst was kidnapped by the Symbionese Liberation Army, Williams attempted to negotiate a deal for her release.

In 1967, Williams had the cross removed from the church's sanctuary, saying it was a symbol of death and that his congregation should instead celebrate life and living. "We must all be the cross," he explained.

== LGBT rights activism ==
Drawing on his experiences in the civil rights movement, Williams was one of the first African-Americans to become involved in the gay rights movement. In 1964, he gave a speech at the Society for Individual Rights in San Francisco, which was more outspoken than the contemporary Mattachine Society. Based on the contemporary campaign for African-American voting rights, he suggested that gays should use their votes to gain political power and effect change. In his advice for gay movement to create tensions, he echoed Martin Luther King Jr.'s Letter from Birmingham Jail:

I think that we must not be afraid of controversy or tension. We in the civil rights movement have learned how to rock the boat, how to disturb complacent middle-class people, how to root out complacency. It is good to have strong disagreement because from it comes movement and reaction. Controversy is the need; it stimulates communication and the exchange of ideas. Rejection once in awhile is a good thing too. It forces one to find oneself . . . Tension leads to resolution, to movement; at least, it lets people know that a living, fulfilling movement is on its way.

== Legacy ==
Under his leadership, Glide Memorial became a 10,000-member congregation of all races, ages, genders, ethnicities and sexual orientations. It is the largest provider of social services in the city, serving over three thousand meals a day, providing AIDS/HIV screenings, offering adult education programs, and giving assistance to women dealing with homelessness, domestic violence, substance abuse, and mental health issues.

Williams retired as pastor in 2000 having turned 70 years old, the mandatory age of retirement for pastors employed by the United Methodist Church. (Pastors in the United Methodist Church are not employed by the local church or congregation. Instead, UMC pastors are assigned to a local church by the presiding bishops of the global Church.)

When Williams became ineligible for assignment to a congregation by the episcopate, the local congregation and affiliated non-profit foundation hired Williams to fill a new office entitled Minister of Liberation. The position was created to allow Williams to officially continue to serve the community and church. He retained that office, as well as his position as CEO of the Glide Foundation, until officially stepping down in 2023.

In August 2013, the intersection of Ellis and Taylor Streets (location of the Glide church in San Francisco) was renamed "Rev. Cecil Williams Way" in honor of Williams.

Both Williams and the church are featured in the 2006 film The Pursuit of Happyness.

== Personal life and death ==
Williams was married to school teacher Evelyn Robinson (1927–1982) from 1956 until their divorce in 1976. They had two children: a son, Albert, and a daughter, Kim. He was married to Janice Mirikitani, a poet, from 1982 until her death in 2021.

Williams died on April 22, 2024, at the age of 94.

== Bibliography ==
- Williams, Cecil (1980). I'm Alive: An Autobiography. San Francisco, CA: Harper & Row. ISBN 9780062509505.
- Williams, Cecil; Mirikitani, Janice (2013). Beyond the Possible: 50 Years of Creating Radical Change in a Community Called Glide. Dave Eggers (Forward). New York City, NY: Harper Collins. ISBN 9780062105059.
