= Winema Theater =

Coordinates: 40.48424°N 124.10254°W

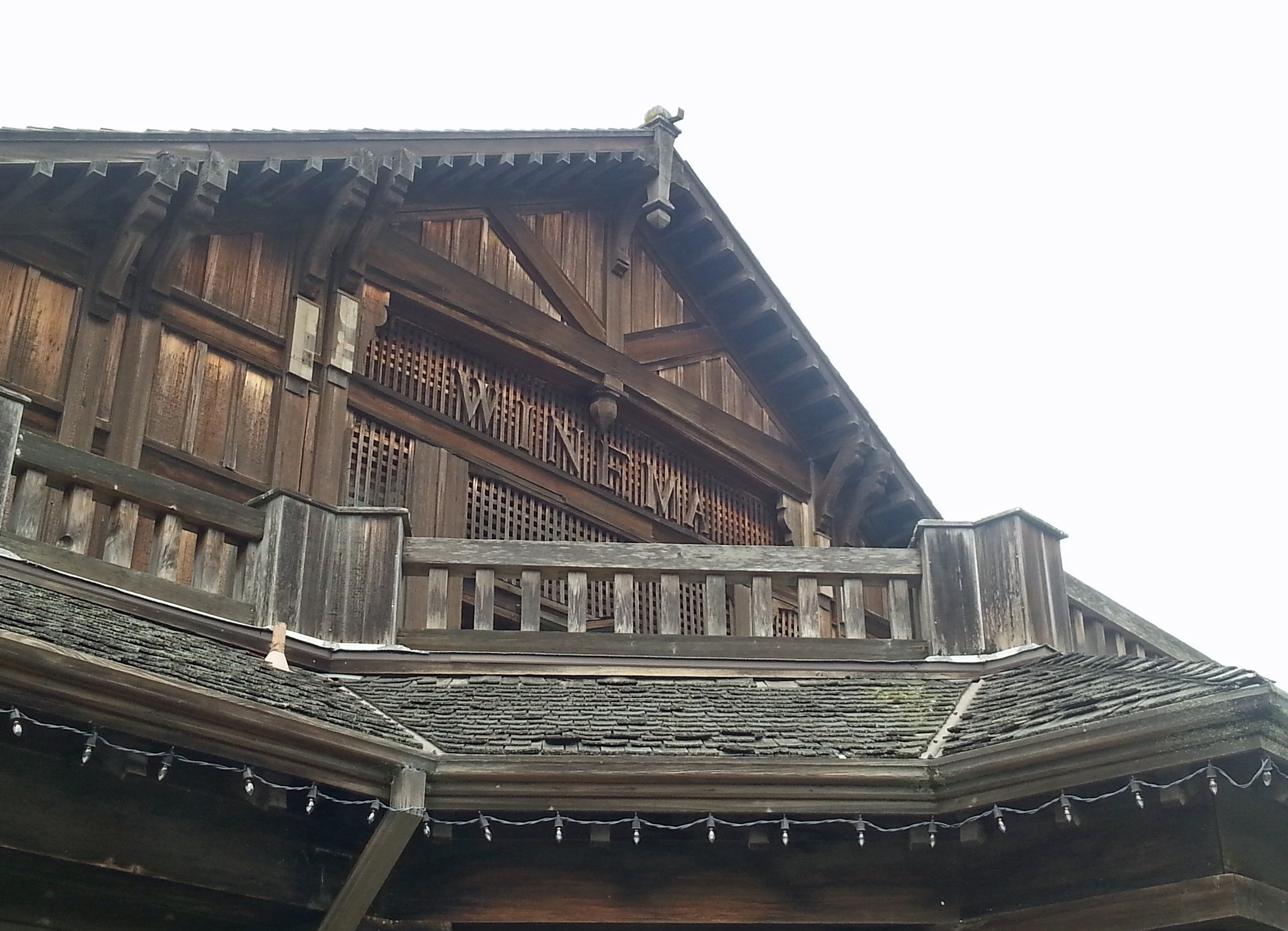
Winema Theater signage below roofline

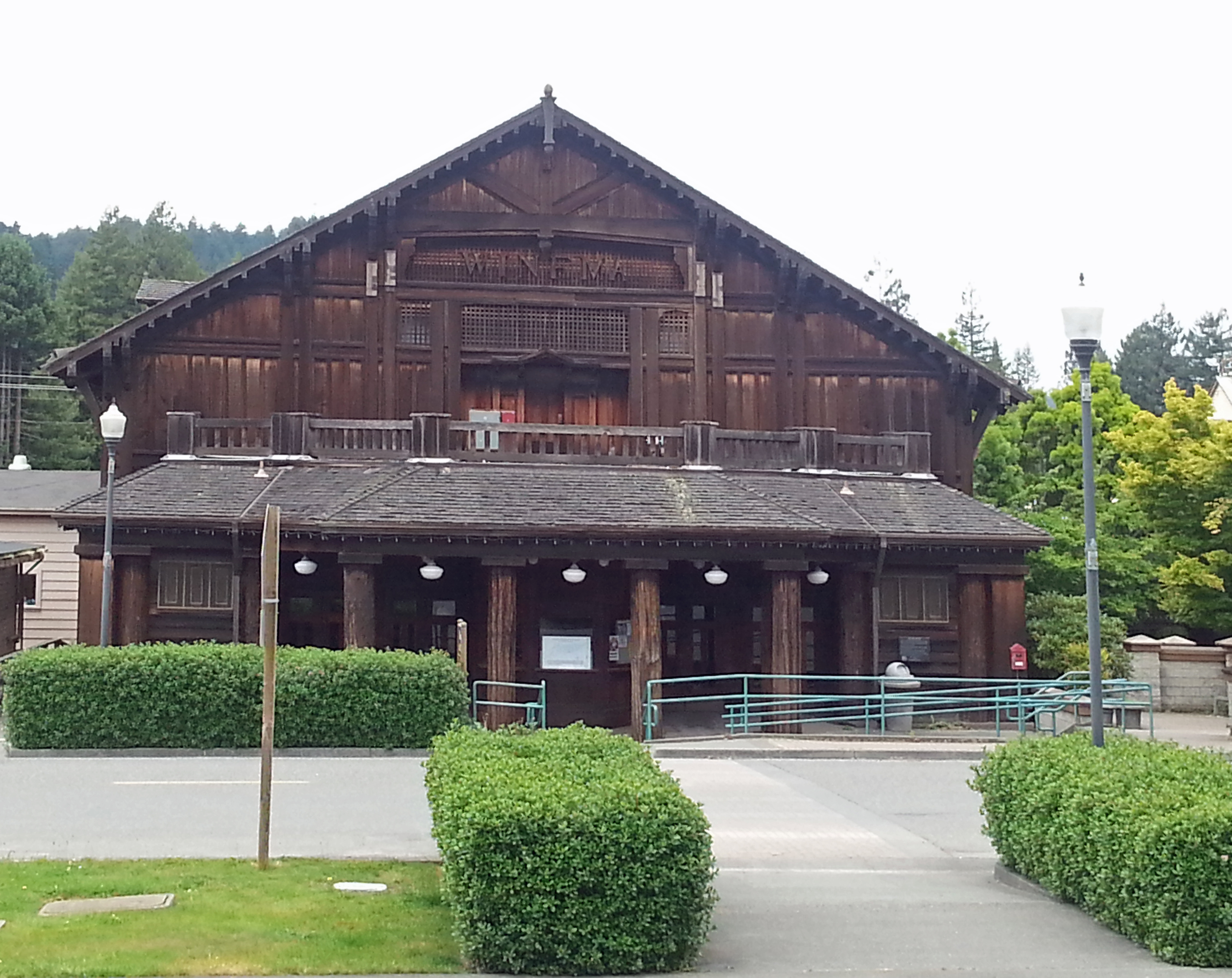
The Winema Theater in Scotia, California in 2017

The Winema Theater is a historic wooden theater building in the lumber town of Scotia, California. Built in a rustic style with redwood logs, it was designed by San Francisco architect Alfred Henry Jacobs and built in 1919. The first show was held in 1920. It was renovated in 2002. A historic marker is outside the theater. It has a gabled roof and a colonnade of redwood logs.
