= Glide Foundation =

Charity based in San Francisco, California, US

- Formation: 1929
- Type: Charitable organization
- Headquarters: San Francisco, CA, United States
- President and Chief Executive Officer: Karen Hanrahan
- Key people: Jay Williams; Rita Shimmin; Cecil Williams; Janice Mirikitani
- Website: www.glide.org

The Glide Foundation is a charity organization that helps the homeless, based in San Francisco, California, associated with devout Methodist Lizzie Glide and the Glide Church.

== Lizzie Glide ==
Lizzie Glide was the widow of millionaire cattleman, H.L. Glide of Sacramento.

Lizzie Glide's daughter Elizabeth Glide and Seldon Roane Williams were married on April 24, 1913, at Lizzie's apartments in Cloyne Court Hotel. Their home at 2821 Claremont Boulevard was Seldon Williams House.

== History ==
Glide and the foundation bought the Hotel Californian two blocks from the church in 1935 and it was operated as a temperance hotel for decades. She also funded a home for young working Christian women and a dorm for young Christian women at U.C. Berkeley.

== Recent activities ==
The foundation has worked with investor Warren Buffett who has donated the proceeds from his eBay "Power Lunch with Warren Buffett" auctions to Glide. As of 2017, he had raised nearly $24 million for the Foundation. The winning bid in 2006 was $620,100, won by Duan Yongping, a California investor. In 2008, Mohnish Pabrai and Guy Spier won the auction for $650,100. The 2009 auction was won with a bid of $1.68 million by an anonymous bidder In 2011 an anonymous bidder paid $2,626,411 for a lunch with Buffet. The June 9, 2012 auction for lunch with Buffett yielded a record figure of $3,456,789; the highest figure paid for lunch with the investor at the time. This number was tied at the 2016 auction. The 2017 winning bid was $2.68 million. In 2019, the annual auction closed with a winning bid of $4,567,888 by Justin Sun. In 2022, the 21st "Grand Finale" auction closed with a winning record bid of $19,000,100 from an anonymous bidder, bringing the total raised by the annual actions to over $53 million. In 2025, AI entrepreneur Yi Shi won the charity auction with a six-figure bid for a lunch with Marc Benioff. Shi had previously attended the Warren Buffett lunch in 2015. The Glide auction's winners traditionally dine with Buffett at New York's Smith and Wollensky steak house. The restaurant donates at least $10,000 to Glide each year to host the auction lunch.

== Power Lunch Winning Bids ==
Event number	Year	Winning bid (USD)
22	2025	$200,100
21	2022	$19 million
20	2019	$4.57 million
19	2018	$4.23 million
18	2017	$2.68 million
17	2016	$3.46 million
16	2015	$2.35 million
15	2014	$2.16 million
14	2013	$1 million
13	2012	$3.46 million
12	2011	$2.63 million
11	2010	$2.63 million
10	2009	$1.68 million
9	2008	$2.1 million
8	2007	$650,100
7	2006	$620,100
6	2005	$351,100
5	2004	$202,100
4	2003	$250,100
3	2002	$25,000
2	2001	$18,000
1	2000	$25,000
