= Jimmy Mirikitani =

Japanese-American artist (1920–2012)

- Born: Tsutomu Mirikitani; June 15, 1920; Sacramento, California, US
- Died: October 21, 2012 (aged 92); New York City, New York, US
- Known for: drawing; painting

Tsutomu "Jimmy" Mirikitani (June 15, 1920 – October 21, 2012) was an American artist notable as the subject of the 2006 documentary film The Cats of Mirikitani.

== Biography ==
Mirikitani was born June 15, 1920, in Sacramento, California. By age 4, his family had moved to Hiroshima, Japan. He returned to the US shortly before the US entered World War II, and as a result he was sent to the Tule Lake internment camp. In the decades after the war, he worked a series of odd jobs until the early 1950s, when he wound up unemployed and homeless in New York City. Here he began producing brightly colored drawings with ballpoint pen or colored pencil and selling them in parks. When an art professor found him sleeping in the Columbia University library, he referred Mirikitani to the New York Buddhist Church, who provided him with housing. During this time, he obtained employment as a cook and met Jackson Pollock at a restaurant in Long Island. He eventually became a live-in cook for a wealthy benefactor living on Park Avenue, but when this person died in the late 1980s he again became homeless.

In 2001, he met filmmaker Linda Hattendorf, who purchased some of his art and began filming him. Eventually her content became the 2006 documentary film The Cats of Mirikitani, which outlines Mirikitani's life and covers his artwork. After the film's release, Mirikitani's first solo exhibition was organized by the Wing Luke Asian Museum of Seattle; it then traveled to the Asian/Pacific/American Institute at New York University, the University of North Texas, and Portland's Nikkei Legacy Center, among others. In 2010 his work was featured in an exhibit of Japanese American Internment Camp artwork at the Smithsonian's Renwick Gallery. In 2011, his work was featured at the Japanese Canadian National Museum.

In 2023, his works were displayed in Snoqualmie City Hall on loan from the Wing Luke Museum, which is the first art gallery at the hall since the COVID-19 pandemic.

From February 19, 2026–June 28, 2026, the Spencer Museum of Art at the University of Kansas, Lawrence exhibited Street Nihonga: The Art of Jimmy Tsutomu Mirikitani. The exhibit featured approximately 160 works in different mediums that “became both a survival strategy and a means of transforming memories of his transpacific journey and Japanese American experiences into shared testimony.”
