= Tay-Bush Inn raid =

1961 police raid in San Francisco

Tay-Bush Inn raid Tay-Bush raid
- Part of Gay liberation movement
- Date: September 14, 1961
- Venue: Tay-Bush Inn
- Location: Bush Street at Taylor Street, Lower Nob Hill, San Francisco, California, U.S.

The Tay-Bush Inn raid was a 1961 police raid on an all-night, one-room café in San Francisco, California. It was the largest raid on a gay bar in this city and is considered a pivotal event in the history of LGBT rights in San Francisco.

== Background ==
On August 28, 1951, the Supreme Court of California ruled in Stoumen v. Reilly that gays have a right to freely assemble. Despite this, by the mid 1950s, and with the support of the state Alcoholic Beverage Control Board and newly elected San Francisco mayor George Christopher, the San Francisco Police Department was able to exploit vague and imprecise language in the Stoumen v. Reilly ruling to continue to surveil, harass, and raid gay bars. Christopher ran on an anti-crime platform that specifically targeted gay bars in his attempts to make San Francisco more family friendly. SFPD aided in policing gay bars by providing the Alcoholic Beverage Control Board with plainclothes officers who would arrest patrons via entrapment. In 1960, the “gayola” scandal revealed a pattern of San Francisco police demanding bribes from bar owners to protect them from raids, the exposure of which ended the policy and led to an even stricter crackdown on gay establishments.

== The Raid ==
At 3:15 a.m. on September 14, 1961, undercover police officers arrested 103 out of 242 patrons of the Tay-Bush Inn, most of whom were charged as “visitors to a disorderly house”. They arrested 89 men and 14 women. The arrested were described in the press as mostly white and middle-class men. Firsthand accounts said that they allowed white professional or politically connected patrons to leave before arresting largely working class people of color.

Ultimately, all but two of the charges were eventually dropped.

== Aftermath and Legacy ==
The raid marked a turning point in public opinion. In response to the incident, media coverage became more critical of the SFPD’s policing methods.

The conservative learning newspaper The San Francisco Examiner published a critical depiction of those in the bar, along with a photo of some of the accused patrons in suits and ties. The Examiner also published the names, ages, addresses, occupations, and employers of the professionals arrested. According the Examiner, those arrested included actors, actresses, professional dancers, a hospital psychologist, a bank department manager, an artist, and an Air Force purchasing agent. The liberal learning San Francisco Chronicle was more sympathetic toward the arrested and the bar’s owner, a 27-year-old white gay man named Robert “Bob” Johnson. These depictions of the arrested as white professionals was influential in garnering public favor.

Following the incident, some media professionals claimed that police should segregate gay bars rather than try to get rid of them. Newspaper columnist Guy Wright argued that getting rid of gay bars would push gay men into heterosexual bars instead.

The mayoral office and police department had differing reactions to the closure of the Tay-Bush Inn. A spokesman for the SFPD maintained their stance on homosexual immorality, citing the same-sex dancing they witnessed in the bar as immoral. Mayor George Christopher cited violations of fire codes as the reason for the bar’s closure, rather than focusing on homosexuality.

The raid also marked a turning point legally for gay bars. Prior to the incident, many people arrested in gay bars pleaded guilty to avoid public humiliation. Many of those involved in the Tay-Bush Inn raid pleaded not guilty and had their charges dropped. In doing so, they took a moral stance on the laws regulating gay bars. In court, Johnson pleaded not guilty to the charges of keeping a disorderly house. As part of his defense, he identified the cafe as a “gathering spot for homosexuals,” but refuted the idea that this meant it was disorderly. He won the case, and his chargers were dropped. The Mattachine Society played an influential legal role, providing representation for the defendants in the case.

The LGBTQ community also organized new groups to combat these injustices, namely the Society for Individual Rights (SIR), Citizens Alert, the Tavern Guild, and the Council of Religion and the Homosexual (CRH).

Following the Tay-Bush Inn raid, the 1965 New Years Ball at California Hall (a fundraiser for the Council on Religion and the Homosexual and other homophile organizations) also ended in a police raid and subsequent lawsuit for gay rights.

The site of the Tay-Bush Inn is now called the La Galleria Condominiums (at 900 Bush Street), a 14-story building that contains 152 units.

== See also ==
- Gayola, a type of police bribe
- Hazel's Inn raid (1956)
- Cooper Do-nuts Riot (1959)
