= 1950s in LGBTQ rights =

This is a list of notable events in the history of LGBT rights that took place worldwide in the 1950s.

== 1950 ==
- Donald Webster Cory publishes The Homosexual in America: A Subjective Approach. The book is hailed as one of the most important works in the history of the gay rights movement.
- February — Under Secretary of State John Peurifoy tells a United States Senate committee of a "homosexual underground" in the State Department. His remarks along with gay baiting comments from Senator Joseph McCarthy help ignite the so-called "Lavender scare".
- November 11 — After two years of planning, five friends in Los Angeles found the Mattachine Society, the first major gay organization in the United States.

== 1951 ==
- August 28 — The Supreme Court of California rules in Stoumen v. Reilly that the mere congregation of homosexuals at a bar was not sufficient grounds for suspending the bar's liquor license. The ruling came in the case of the Black Cat Bar, a San Francisco gay bar that was the target of a 15-year campaign by state and local authorities to shut it down.

== 1952 ==
- June 23 — Following his arrest on charges of "lewd behavior", Mattachine Society co-founder Dale Jennings exercises his right to a jury trial in an era when men almost uniformly pleaded guilty to such charges. At trial he acknowledges his homosexuality but denies the specific charge. The jury deadlocks 11-1 for acquittal and the charges are dropped. Mattachine declares a legal victory and membership in the Society swells.
- March 31 — Alan Turing lost his trial versus the UK's government and was banned from the US. He was later chemically castrated. (The UK Prime minister apologised for this after a survey in 2009)
- November 15 — Articles of incorporation for One, Inc., an early homophile group, are signed.

== 1953 ==
- Alfred Kinsey and the Institute for Sex Research publish Sexual Behavior in the Human Female, the second of two Kinsey Reports.
- April 27 — President Dwight D. Eisenhower signs Executive Order 10450. Among other effects, the order establishes "sexual perversion" as grounds for the investigation and dismissal of federal employees.

== 1954 ==
- March 16 — The Army–McCarthy hearings convene to investigate conflicting charges made by the United States Army and Senator Joseph McCarthy about allegations of preferential treatment that McCarthy and his aide Roy Cohn had secured for Cohn's friend David Schine. The hearings include inquiries into the supposed security risks posed by homosexuals employed by the federal government and include instances of gay-baiting by Special Counsel for the Army Joseph Welch. Notably, Welch defines a pixie as being "a close relative of a fairy". "Fairy" is a slang term for "homosexual" and Welch's remark is interpreted as a jibe at Cohn, a closeted homosexual.
- August — Following a series of high-profile arrests and trials, the Wolfenden Commission is formed in England to examine the possibility of reforming the laws relating to male homosexual conduct.

== 1955 ==
- The New York chapter of the Mattachine Society is founded.
- April 14 — in the wake of a moral panic brought on by the sexual assault and murder of a boy in 1954, Iowa enacts a "sexual psychopath" law, allowing for the involuntary commitment of anyone charged with a public offense who possessed "criminal propensities toward the commission of sex offenses". Twenty gay men from the Sioux City area, none of them suspected of having any connection with the crime that inspired the law, were committed in 1955. Another 13 men were arrested in a sweep in 1958, but were not committed as sexual psychopaths.
- October 19 — The Daughters of Bilitis, the first American organization specifically for lesbians, is founded in San Francisco.
- October 31 — Three men are arrested in Boise, Idaho, on charges of lewd conduct and sodomy, inciting a moral panic in Boise that resulted in 16 arrests, 15 convictions and almost 1,500 people being questioned.
- December 22 — The United States Court of Appeals for the District of Columbia Circuit denies an appeal from Raymond W. Longernecker, whom the Veterans Administration (VA) had denied benefits under the G.I. Bill. Longernecker held a blue discharge, which meant he had been separated from military service under conditions neither honorable nor dishonorable. The Court found that two laws specifically denied the courts jurisdiction over such decisions by the VA Administrator. Nevertheless, the Court noted that the denial of benefits should only have occurred if Longernecker had been dishonorably discharged and that the VA Administrator was acting without authority in treating a blue discharge as if it were dishonorable.

== 1956 ==
- February 22 — The Hazel's Inn raid near San Francisco, California results in nearly 100 arrests of homosexuals.
- May — Confidential magazine publishes an expose on Sumner Welles' 1940 sex scandal, the Pullman porter affair.

== 1957 ==
- The Homosexual Law Reform Society forms in England for the sole purpose of decriminalizing homosexual acts.
- September 4 — The Wolfenden report is published in England. The committee recommends "that homosexual behavior between consenting adults in private should no longer be a criminal offense". The committee also recommended that the age of consent for sexual acts between men be set at 21, in contrast to 16 for heterosexual and lesbian sex.
- December 20 — Frank Kameny is fired from his job as an astronomer in the United States Army's Map Service in Washington, D.C., because of his homosexuality. A few days later he is blacklisted from seeking federal employment. These events spur Kameny into being a gay rights activist.

== 1958 ==
- January 13 — The United States Supreme Court rules in One, Inc. v. Olesen that ONE: The Homosexual Magazine was not an obscene publication. It is the first U.S. Supreme Court ruling related to homosexuality.

== 1959 ==
- May — LGBT people clash with police at Cooper's Donuts, a hang-out for drag queens and street hustlers who were frequently harassed by the Los Angeles Police Department (LAPD). Police arrest three people, including John Rechy, but other patrons begin pelting the police with donuts and coffee cups. The LAPD calls for back-up and arrests a number of rioters. Rechy and the other two original detainees are able to escape.
- December 23 — In Vallerga v. Department of Alcoholic Beverage Control, the Supreme Court of California rules that a 1955 statute allowing ABC to revoke the liquor license of any establishment that was a "resort ... for sexual perverts" violated the state constitution. The court indicates that had the revocation been based on accusations of homosexual conduct rather than the mere gathering of homosexuals, it might have upheld the statute. It established the right of LGBT people to congregate in California as long as they did not express their sexuality physically.

== See also ==
- Timeline of LGBT history — timeline of events from 12,000 BCE to present
- LGBT rights by country or territory — current legal status around the world
- LGBT social movements
