= Cooper Do-nuts Riot =

Alleged 1959 LGBTQ uprising in Los Angeles, California

- Part of events leading to the Gay liberation movement
- A Cooper Do-nuts location in 1961
- Date: May 1959
- Location: Cooper Do-nuts, 215 South Main Street, Los Angeles, California, US
- Goals: Gay liberation and LGBTQ rights in the United States

Parties
Los Angeles Police Department	Patrons of Cooper Do‑nuts cafe

The Cooper Do-nuts Riot was an uprising in reaction to police harassment of LGBTQ people at a 24-hour donut cafe in Los Angeles in 1959. Whether the riot actually happened, the date, location and whether or not the cafe was a branch of the Cooper chain are all disputed, and there is a lack of contemporary documentary evidence, with the Los Angeles Police Department (LAPD) stating that any records of such event would have been purged years ago.

According to John Rechy, who stated he was at the event, it occurred in 1958 or 1959, about 10 years prior to the better-known Stonewall riots in New York City, and is viewed by some historians as the first modern LGBTQ uprising in the United States.

== Background ==
Few people lived openly as LGBTQ in the 1950s, and those that did faced both social and legal consequences for doing so. One of the few places they were welcome were gay bars, which themselves often faced legal consequences for serving them, such as the loss of their license. Los Angeles law made it illegal for a person's gender presentation not to match the gender shown on their ID, and this was often used to target and arrest transgender or cross-dressing bar patrons. For this reason, many gay bars were hostile to transgender patrons and banned or discouraged them from entering.

Novelist John Rechy, who says he was present at the riot, described the routine arrests in his 1963 novel, City of Night: "They interrogate you, fingerprint you without booking you: an illegal L.A. cop-tactic to scare you from hanging around." The names of individuals arrested in a bar raid would routinely be reported by local newspapers, outing them to the community, usually resulting in the loss of jobs and being socially ostracized. Arrests by the LAPD for homosexuality had increased by more than 85% in the previous decade under the police chief William H. Parker. Queer activist Harry Hay later recalled that abuse of LGBTQ people by police was common during this time, and sometimes met resistance.

== Riots ==
At times, Rechy has said that the shop was located on the 500 block of South Main Street and did not belong to the Cooper chain, but that donut shops were referred to by that name generically. A common version of the story says that Cooper Do-nuts was a café at 215 South Main Street in downtown Los Angeles' Skid Row neighborhood. Located near two gay bars—Harold's, at 555 South Main Street, and The Waldorf, at 521 South Main Street—and open all night, it was a popular hangout for gay people, and welcomed them. One evening in May 1959 (Rechy once wrote 1958), two police officers reportedly entered the cafe and asked for IDs from several patrons, a typical form of harassment. The officers are said to have attempted to arrest two drag queens, two male sex workers, and a young man cruising for a date. Rechy said they attempted to arrest him, and described the LAPD's abuse on this night as a culmination of routine targeting of the LGBTQ community.

The report continues that one of those arrested protested the lack of room in the police car for all five of them, and onlookers began throwing assorted coffee, donuts, cups, and trash at the police until they fled in their car without making the arrests. People then reportedly took to rioting and celebrating in the streets, as a larger crowd grew as patrons of surrounding gay bars and others in the area heard about it. The story continues that police backup arrived, blocking off the street for the entire night, and that police beat or arrested several people. Rechy said he was still slated for arrest, but escaped.

== Legacy ==
The Cooper Do-nuts uprising is often cited as the first gay uprising in the United States. Hay identified it as the first specifically against police treatment of LGBTQ people. Some historians contest the significance, claiming that anyone who was openly gay at the time was already in rebellion and risking arrest and imprisonment. Mark Thompson, a historian who lived in the same area as Rechy, wrote: "I would not describe it as a riot but more like an isolated patch of local social unrest that had lasting repercussions. I think less in its day, more as a lesson for us today."

In 2020 the Downtown Los Angeles Neighborhood Council considered making Cooper Do-nuts a historical site and requested police records to corroborate Rechy's account of the riots. The LAPD revealed that there were no records from that time, because they were either "purged or destroyed". Nancy Valverde stated she had heard about the event right away from a friend.

On June 22, 2023, as the City of Los Angeles erected a ceremonial Cooper Do-nuts Square sign at 2nd and Main Streets, the LAPD made a formal apology for its harassment of gay citizens. Commander Ruby Flores said, "I deeply apologize on behalf of the men and women of the LAPD. This mistreatment and harassment of our citizens was wrong. It should have never happened."

== See also ==
- List of LGBTQ actions in the United States prior to the Stonewall riots
- Hazel's Inn raid (1956)
- Tay-Bush Inn raid (1961)
- Compton's Cafeteria riot (1966)
- Black Cat Tavern riot (1967)
- Stonewall riots (1969)
