= City of Night =

1963 novel by John Rechy

- First edition cover
- Author: John Rechy
- Cover artist: Richard Seaver
- Language: English
- Genre: Gay novel
- Publisher: Grove Press, Inc., N.Y.
- Publication date: 1963
- Publication place: United States
- Media type: Print (hardback & paperback)
- Pages: 410 pp

City of Night is a novel written by John Rechy. It was published in 1963 in New York by Grove Press. Earlier excerpts had appeared in Evergreen Review, Big Table, Nugget, and The London Magazine.

City of Night is notable for its exposé approach to and stark depiction of hustling as well as its stream of consciousness narrative style.

== Synopsis ==
A young man (Rechy uses the term "youngman" when referring to hustlers) travels across the country while working as a hustler. The book focuses chapters on locations that the youth visits and certain personages he meets there, from New York City, to Los Angeles, San Francisco, and New Orleans. Throughout the novel, the unnamed narrator has trysts with various peculiar characters, including another hustler, an older man, an S&M enthusiast and a bed-ridden old man. All of these relationships range in the extent of their emotional and sexual nature, as well as in their peculiarity.

The book includes writing about the Cooper Do-nuts Riot, which happened in 1959 in Los Angeles, when the lesbians, gay men, transgender people, and drag queens who hung out at Cooper Do-nuts and who were frequently harassed by the Los Angeles Police Department fought back after police arrested three people, including Rechy. Patrons began pelting the police with donuts and coffee cups. The LAPD called for back-up and arrested a number of rioters. Rechy and the other two original detainees were able to escape.

== Reception and influences ==
The narrator shares many characteristics, including his ethnicity and relative age, with the author at the time. The author uses curious methods to achieve verisimilitude, for instance, omitting the apostrophe in contractions, in order to recreate the speech of characters who are barely literate.

In an interview with Ronald Martinetti of American Legends website, Rechy recalled of Andre Gide: "Gide was quite an influence. I loved his elegant reflections on art in The Counterfeiters, and this influences what I do with my work."

Pornographer David Hurles wrote that "Rechy's story set me free...His story told me of a world I had only hoped might really exist. The effect was visceral, sexy, frightening, and it made my spirit soar. In 1965 this book helped lure me to California."

City of Night inspired film director Gus Van Sant to write the screenplay for My Own Private Idaho.

City of Night is quoted as the main reason film director Toby Ross came to the United States from Switzerland to start his American film career. Upon arrival in Los Angeles, he started searching and looking for the characters mentioned in the book.

City of Night was ranked number 22 on a list of the best 100 gay and lesbian novels compiled by The Publishing Triangle in 1999.

In the song "L.A. Woman" by The Doors, the phrase "City of Night" is repeated in the lyrics, in reference to this book.
