= Grand Ducal Council of San Francisco =

The Grand Ducal Council of San Francisco, Inc., is a predominantly gay 501(c)(3) nonprofit fund raising organization. Formed in 1973 as a more camp-oriented response to San Francisco's Imperial Court System by H.L. Perry, who reigned as the Court's Grand Duchess I, the Grand Ducal Council raises money for a wide array of charity organizations through large annual costume balls and various other, smaller fund raisers throughout the year. Both the Imperial Court System and the Grand Ducal Council of San Francisco are built using roughly the same power structure. "Monarchs" are elected and the nonprofit, 501(c)(3) portion is run by a board of directors or trustees.

The Grand Ducal Council of San Francisco, in turn, inspired similar such organizations to be founded around the country. In 1998, the Grand Ducal Council of San Francisco was joined by a sister Court located in Alameda County, on the opposite side of the San Francisco Bay. A third such sovereign Ducal Court exists in London, Ontario, Canada.

Called "one of the city's unsung gay heroes," in 2006 Perry's work establishing the San Francisco Ducal Council and more were commemorated with a month-long exhibit at the San Francisco Public Library.

== Structure ==
Each individual court chapter (or "realm") is a separate, legally incorporated charitable non-profit organization that raises funds and awareness for various charities and people in need within its realm. Each chapter has its own board of directors and is financially responsible for its own management. In addition to local non-profit status, many courts in the United States have Federal 501(c) status.

== Titles ==
Each court holds an annual "coronation," which is usually the chapter's largest fundraiser and is attended by both local members and members of other Ducal chapters as well Imperial Courts from across North America. The evening culminates in the ceremony in which the new monarch or monarchs—the Grand Duke and Grand Duchess—are crowned. In San Francisco, the new monarchs are determined by popular elections held in the community.

Within a set number of weeks, the newly elected monarchs must hold an "investiture," at which time they name the members of their Court. The titles given to members vary from one chapter to another and are primarily left to the discretion of the reigning monarchs.

Each Court consists of a Royal Crown Prince and Royal Crown Princess, Prince/Princess Royale, Baron/Baroness, etc. Additionally, each year the Court holds fund raising competitions to crown such titles as Royal Baby Girl & Baby Boy, King & Queen of Hearts, Mr. & Miss Royal Bunny, Royal Daddy & Royal Daddy's Boy and White Knight and Debutante. In 2009, the Court added an annual fund raising pageant to crown Miss San Francisco Gold Rush.

== Fundraising ==
Each court conducts numerous fundraisers throughout the year. Drag shows, ranging in size from performances at local bars to events in hotel ballrooms and other large venues, are the main way in which revenue is raised for charity. Especially in recent years, court chapters have diversified their fundraising strategies so as to include yard sales, gift raffles, etc. Court members also solicit donations at LGBT events, gay pride parades and other public events at which they appear.

The Grand Ducal Council of San Francisco donates the funds raised to a variety of causes including those related to AIDS, breast cancer, domestic abuse, and homelessness.

== Membership ==
While composed primarily of gay, lesbian, bisexual and transgender people, each court is open to all. Gay, bisexual, transgender and straight people have all served as monarchs and court members in the system's history. Drag queens collectively comprise about half of the membership.
