= Black Cat Bar =

Historic site in San Francisco

Coordinates: 37.795818°N 122.403257°W

- The exterior of the Black Cat. Image courtesy of the San Francisco History Center, San Francisco Public Library
- Interactive map of Black Cat Bar

Restaurant information
- Established: 1906, 1933
- Location: 710 Montgomery St, San Francisco, California, United States

The Black Cat Bar or Black Cat Café was a bar in San Francisco, California. It originally opened in 1906 and closed in 1921. The Black Cat re-opened in 1933 and operated for another 30 years. During its second run of operation, it was a hangout for Beats and bohemians but over time began attracting more and more of a gay clientele, and becoming a flashpoint for what was then known as the homophile movement, a precursor to the gay liberation movement that gained momentum in the 1960s.

The Black Cat was at the center of a legal fight that was one of the earliest court cases to establish legal protections for gay people in the United States. Despite this victory, continued pressure from law enforcement agencies eventually forced the bar's closure in 1964.

== Origin ==
The Black Cat opened in 1906, shortly after the 1906 San Francisco earthquake. In the early years, the bar was located in the basement of the Athens Hotel at 56 Mason Street in San Francisco's Tenderloin neighborhood. This building still stands today and is now the Bristol Hotel. When entrepreneur Charles Ridley acquired the bar in 1911, he turned it into a showplace for vaudeville-style acts. Over the next several years, Ridley and the Black Cat came under increased police scrutiny as a possible center of prostitution. In 1921, the bar lost its dance permit and closed down.

== Beats and bohemians ==
With the repeal of Prohibition, the Black Cat re-opened in 1933 at 710 Montgomery Street, again under Ridley's proprietorship. Sol Stoumen bought the bar in the 1940s. In the early years of Stoumen's ownership, the Black Cat was a center for the bohemian and Beat crowd. William Saroyan and John Steinbeck were known to frequent the establishment, and part of Jack Kerouac's seminal Beat novel On the Road is set in the bar.

== Growing gay clientele ==
While the Beats continued to congregate at the Black Cat into the 1950s, in the years following World War II, more and more gay people began patronizing it. The varied crowds mixed and gay Beat poet Allen Ginsberg described the Black Cat as "the best gay bar in America. It was totally open, bohemian, San Francisco...and everybody went there, heterosexual and homosexual....All the gay screaming queens would come, the heterosexual gray flannel suit types, longshoremen. All the poets went there." By 1951, the bar was placed on the Armed Forces Disciplinary Control Board's list of establishments which military personnel were forbidden to enter.

The bar featured live entertainers, the best known of whom was José Sarria. Sarria, who began as a waiter, wore drag and entertained the crowd by singing parodies of popular torch songs. Eventually he performed three to four shows a night, along with a regular Sunday afternoon show, with Sarria performing full arias. His specialty was a re-working of Bizet's opera Carmen, set in modern-day San Francisco. Sarria as Carmen would prowl through popular cruising area Union Square. The audience cheered "Carmen" on as she dodged the vice squad and made her escape.

The interior of the bar. Tables were pushed together to form a makeshift stage for live entertainment. Image courtesy of the San Francisco History Center, San Francisco Public Library

Sarria encouraged patrons to be as open and honest as possible, exhorting the clientele, "There's nothing wrong with being gay–the crime is getting caught," and "United we stand, divided they catch us one by one." At closing time, he would lead patrons in singing "God Save Us Nelly Queens" to the tune of "God Save the Queen". Sometimes he would take the crowd outside to sing the final verse to the men across the street in jail, who had been arrested in raids earlier in the night. Speaking of this ritual in the film Word is Out (1977), gay journalist George Mendenhall said:

"It sounds silly, but if you lived at that time and had the oppression coming down from the police department and from society, there was nowhere to turn...and to be able to put your arms around other gay men and to be able to stand up and sing 'God Save Us Nelly Queens'...we were really not saying 'God Save Us Nelly Queens.' We were saying 'We have our rights, too.'"

Sarria became the first openly gay candidate in the United States to run for public office, running in 1961 for a seat on the San Francisco Board of Supervisors. Sarria almost won by default. On the last day for candidates to file petitions, city officials realized that there were fewer than five candidates running for the five open seats, which would have assured Sarria a seat. By the end of the day, 34 candidates had filed. Sarria garnered some 6,000 votes, shocking political pundits and setting in motion the idea that a gay voting bloc could wield real power in city politics. As Sarria put it, "From that day on, nobody ran for anything in San Francisco without knocking on the door of the gay community."

== Police harassment ==
In 1948, the San Francisco Police Department and the Alcoholic Beverage Control Commission, in response to the Black Cat's increasing homosexual clientele, began a campaign of harassment against the bar and its patrons. Bar owner Stoumen was charged with such crimes as "keeping a disorderly house" and the State Board of Equalization suspended the bar's liquor license indefinitely. In response and on principle, Stoumen, who was heterosexual, took the state to court. In 1951, the California Supreme Court, in Stoumen v. Reilly (37 Cal.2d 713) ruled that "[i]n order to establish 'good cause' for suspension of plaintiff's license, something more must be shown than that many of his patrons were homosexuals and that they used his restaurant and bar as a meeting place." This was one of the earliest legal affirmations of the rights of gay people in the United States. The court qualified its opinion, however, by stating that ABC might still close gay bars with "proof of the commission of illegal or immoral acts on the premises."

In response to this legal victory and based on the "illegal or immoral acts" language of the opinion, the state passed a constitutional amendment creating the California Department of Alcoholic Beverage Control (ABC). The California State Assembly in 1955 passed a law authorizing broad powers for the ABC to shut down any "resort [for] sexual perverts." The Black Cat was shut down under this authority, along with a number of other establishments. In 1958, the California Courts of Appeal affirmed the authority of the ABC in Nickola v. Munro, but in a 1959 case involving an Oakland bar, Vallerga v. Department of Alcoholic Beverage Control, the California Supreme Court struck down this new law as unconstitutional. This decision was not a complete victory, as the court noted that had the ABC's revocation been based on "reports of women dancing with other women and women kissing other women" it might have upheld the law. Homosexuals, therefore, had won the right to assemble but only if they agreed not to touch.

Police and city officials responded to the increasing visibility of the Black Cat and other gay bars in the city, and the Black Cat's success in court, by increasingly cracking down, staging more frequent raids and mass arrests. One favorite tactic was to arrest drag queens, since impersonating a member of the opposite sex was, at the time, a crime. Sarria responded by passing out labels for the drag queens to wear reading "I am a boy" so it could not be claimed they were impersonating women.

== Closure ==
By 1963, following some 15 years of unrelenting pressure from the police and the ABC, Stoumen decided he was no longer able financially to sustain the fight. The cost of his long legal battle was more than $38,000. Sarria tried to enlist the owners of the city's other gay bars to help Stoumen pay his legal bills, but none offered any assistance. The ABC lifted the bar's liquor license in 1963, the night before its annual Halloween party. After a final defiant Halloween celebration at which only non-alcoholic beverages were served and an attempt to survive on food and soft drink sales, the Black Cat closed down for good in February 1964.

The site is now the location of Maison Nico, a high-end restaurant. On December 15, 2007, a plaque commemorating the Black Cat and its place in San Francisco history was placed at the site.

== See also ==
- List of LGBTQ bars
