= Tavern Guild =

Former LGBT organization in USA

The Tavern Guild was an association of gay bar owners and liquor wholesalers that formed in 1962 in San Francisco, California, and lasted until 1995.

The Guild was the first gay business association in the United States, formed in response to rising tensions between the police and gay people. This coalition helped unify and protect gay bars and bartenders by fixing drink prices, developing a phone network to track police raids, and setting up funds for members who were unemployed. They also organized many fundraisers and charity events, including the annual Beaux Arts Ball.

While the Tavern Guild disbanded in 1995, the San Francisco Tavern Guild Foundation continues to operate the Community Thrift Store in the Mission District of San Francisco, benefiting many Bay Area nonprofit organizations.

== Founding ==
The Tavern Guild was founded on a Tuesday night in 1962 at the Suzy-Q, a gay bar on Polk Street. Phil Doganiero, a popular bartender at Suzy Q, was elected the first president of the organization, succeeded by Bill Plath (owner of the D'Oak Room) and Darryl Glied (owner of the Jumpin' Frog) in the following years.

The organization met weekly to discuss the various issues of the gay bar community, including the constant police raids and discrimination. In order to bring business to the bars and protect its members, the Guild fixed drink prices so that bars wouldn't compete with each other, as well as monitored and eradicated unsafe business practices and rumormongering (straight bar owners had a habit of marketing themselves as a gay bar if their business was struggling and then turn away homosexuals once their bar was doing better.) Showing a unified front also helped keep the police and the California Department of Alcoholic Beverage Control (ABC) off their backs, and helped relations between alcohol distributors and Guild bars.

== Impact ==
One of the first things the Tavern Guild set up was a phone networking system that kept track of police and Department of Alcoholic Beverage Control movements, warning bars that were about to be raided. They also set up a loan fund for Guild members that were left unemployed due to police raids and shutdowns, making sure good bartenders stayed employed.

As the organization developed from a small group of drinking buddies to a large non-profit charity, the Guild put on many fundraising events. Hosted at bars or featuring many drinking activities, these events helped the Guild become a huge financial and political force, one that could push an LGBTQ civil rights agenda and hold sway with politicians. They held Monday night auctions to increase patronage at various bars, hosted annual Election Day Parties as well as an annual picnic in Marin County known for its drinking games and cruising.

One of the most important events the Tavern Guild sponsored was the annual Halloween drag ball, known as the Beaux Arts Ball. It was San Francisco's first large public drag ball, beginning in 1963 and continuing well into the 70's. During the 1965 Ball, José Sarria was named queen of the ball, then declared himself Empress, which became tradition. Every year at the ball, an Empress would be elected to lead the newly established Imperial Court System.

By 1980, the Guild had at least 184 members and 86 businesses, and gay bar communities in other cities were forming their own versions.

The Tavern Guild helped raise money for many organizations, including the Society for Individual Rights and homophile organizations such as the Mattachine Society and the Daughters of Bilitis. They also helped raise money for people not part of the LGBTQ community, including the United Farm Workers and the Civil Rights Movement, even raising funds to send delegates to Selma.

== Community Thrift Store ==
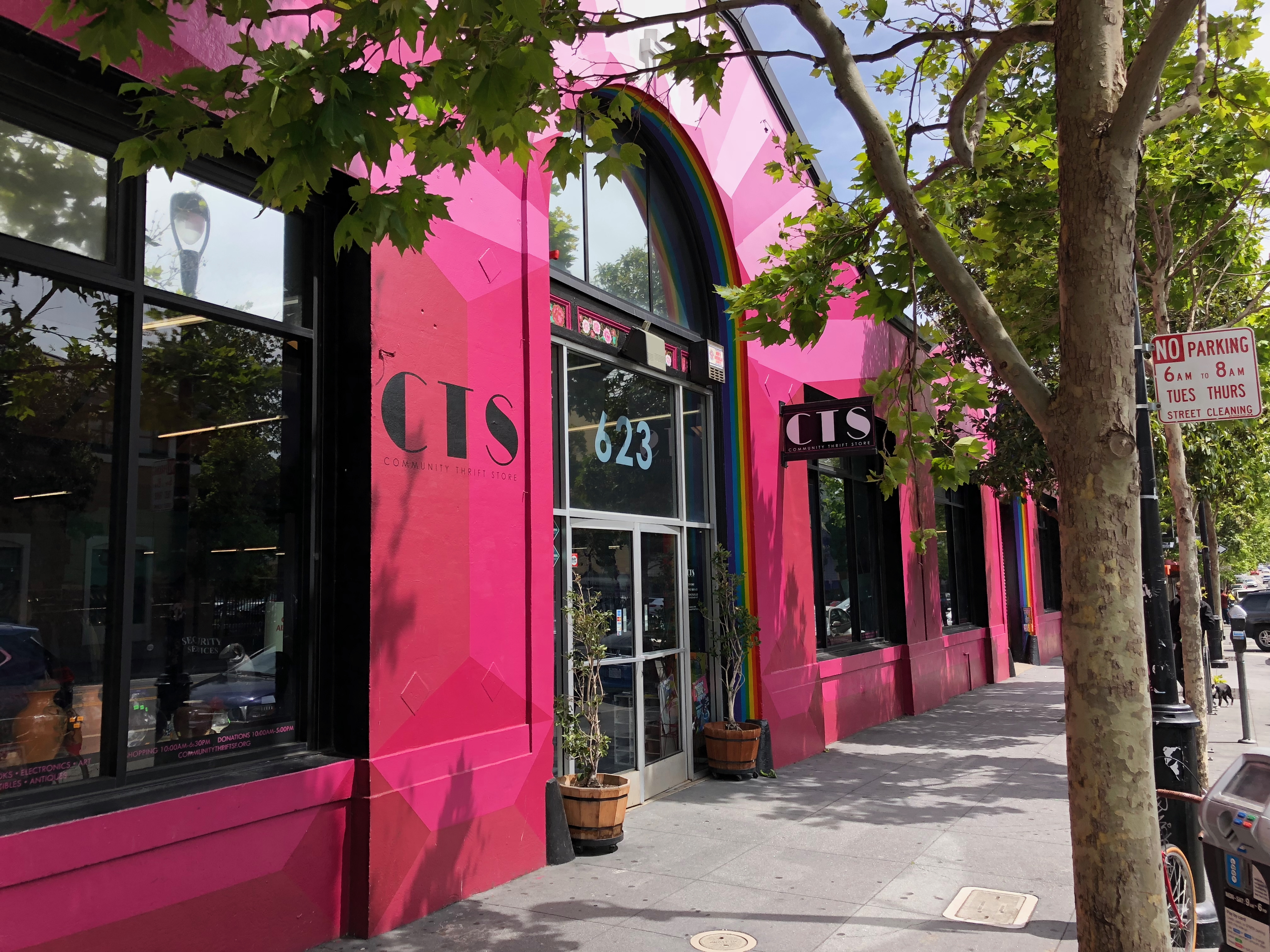
Community Thrift Store in 2018

Of the many service-oriented fundraising projects that were started by the Tavern Guild, the Community Thrift Store remains in operation in San Francisco's Mission District. The Tavern Guild established the store in 1982 to support AIDS-related charities. While the Tavern Guild disbanded in 1995, Community Thrift Store continues to operate under the San Francisco Tavern Guild Foundation with all proceeds benefiting Bay Area charitable organizations.

== See also ==
- 1962 in LGBT rights
- Society for Individual Rights
