= Hazel's Inn raid =

Police raid on gay bar in 1956

- Part of events leading to the Gay liberation movement
- Police checking identification after raid, 1956
- Date: February 19, 1956; 70 years ago
- Location: Pacifica, California, U.S. 37°37′49″N 122°29′35″W
- Caused by: Violations of state "lewd vagrancy" law
- Goals: Intimidation of homosexuals

Parties
United States; San Mateo County Sheriff's Department; Alcoholic Beverage Control; California Highway Patrol	LGBT patrons; American Civil Liberties Union

Lead figures
Sheriff Earl Whitmore	Hazel Nickola

Number
35	300 (approximate)

Casualties
- Arrested: 90
- Charged: 30
- Fined: 2

The Hazel's Inn raid was a police raid on a gay bar in Pacifica, California, on February 19, 1956. Thirty-five officers from the San Mateo County Sheriff's Department raided the bar, arresting 77 gay men and 10 lesbians, for "operating a dance without a permit" and serving alcohol to minors. The American Civil Liberties Union's involvement in the patrons' defense represented one of the organization's first ever LGBT legal rights cases.

== Background ==
In 1915, the chashitsu from the Panama–Pacific International Exposition was relocated to "Salada Sands," the future site of Hazel's Inn. In the early-1930s, the property around the chashitsu was expanded to include a tavern and motel, which were all sold together to Earl and Hazel Nickola in 1939, who renamed the business Hazel's Inn.

Located on a beach next to the Pacific Ocean and near Sharp Park Golf Course, Hazel's Inn became known as a beach escape for San Franciscans during World War II.

In the 1950s, a socially conservative anti-gay moral panic known as the Lavender Scare resulted in widespread police raids of "homosexual gatherings" in San Francisco and throughout the Bay Area. Fears of arrest pushed the city's gays further south, where they eventually settled on Hazel's Inn — which was known as a tolerant establishment.

== Police raid ==
As Hazel's Inn became known as a gay-friendly establishment, it grew into a destination, regularly drawing as many as 500 people on weekends. This rapid growth, however, also attracted the attention of San Mateo County law enforcement. After being tipped off by neighbors about "unusual activity" at the Inn, plainsclothes officers surveilled the bar at least seven times between January and February 1956. As a result of the surveillance, Sheriff Earl Whitmore led a 35-person raid on Hazel's Inn, which included military police, officers from the California Highway Patrol, and Alcoholic Beverage Control agents.

Shortly after midnight on February 20, 1956, Whitmore's raid began, with the Sheriff jumping on the bar and shouting "This is a raid!" The officers rounded up the Inn's approximately 300 patrons and picked out 90 individuals (seventy-seven men, ten women, and three minors) for arrest. Hazel Nickola was arrested for "operating a dance without a permit," and the Inn's three bartenders for allegedly serving drinks to minors.

== Aftermath ==
The majority of the ninety people arrested were San Francisco residents. They were booked in Redwood City and most were charged with "lewd vagrancy" — a catch-all charge used in the 1950s to target African Americans, poor people, and homosexuals. The juveniles were sent to juvenile hall, while Nickola was released on $250 bail. In an interview with the San Mateo Times, Sheriff Whitmore stated, "The purpose of the raid was to let it be known that we are not going to tolerate gatherings of homosexuals in this county." Hazel's Inn was described as "a resort for sexual perverts."

== ACLU involvement ==
After launching an investigation, the Northern California branch of the ACLU chose to represent 30 of the defendants from the raid. The ACLU newsletter stated, "As far as can be ascertained, none of the patrons of the tavern were misbehaving or breaking any laws when the arrests occurred. The complaint seems to be that these men were making the tavern a ‘hang-out.’ Of course, there is no law against that, so long as their activity was lawful."

During the trials, San Mateo County Sheriff's officers testified against the patrons, stating they had witnessed a white man kissing a Filipino man, and another white man briefly fondling an African-American man. They further testified, "The few female patrons were dressed in mannish attire, and most of them danced with each other." Throughout the trial, the ACLU decried the action as "headline hunting" and challenged the constitutionality of California's vagrancy law. The ACLU was able to successfully clear 27 defendants of the charges. Two men were ultimately found guilty by the jury; they were ordered to pay heavy fines and were banished from San Mateo County for two years.

== Nickola v. Munro ==
Hazel Nickola, meanwhile, lost her liquor license as a result of the raid. Nickola chose to challenge the decision in court, claiming that even though "there was considerable dancing of men with men” at the inn, “it never occurred to her that they might be homos.” The case, Nickola v. Munro, was heard in the California Courts of Appeal and was argued by Nikola's attorney John A. Putkey on one side and California's Attorney General Pat Brown on the other.

The case focused on California Business and Professions Code 24200(e), which allowed the California Department of Alcoholic Beverage Control to regulate bars that catered to or allowed the presence of "sex perverts." In court, Nickola admitted, "Many of the men had their arms wrapped around each other's waists, or shoulders, or buttocks. Many men were observed kissing or fondling or biting each other, or holding hands, and other men were seen sitting on the laps of their male companions and kissing and fondling each other." State agents further testified, "Men were seen powdering their faces, talking in effeminate voices, and generally acting like over-affectionate females."

The court decision affirmed the revoking of Nickola's license and ultimately empowered the State of California to broaden its definition of "illicit behavior." According to the historian Nan Alamilla Boyd, the case remains significant in California's legal history because it "whittled down the homosexual right to assembly and bolstered the state's ability to permanently shut down gay bars and taverns."

== Similar cases ==
The Bay Area Reporter noted similarities between the raid on Hazel's Inn with 1960s raids in San Francisco's Tenderloin District, such as the Compton's Cafeteria riot. In Los Angeles, the Cooper Do-nuts Riot was sparked after police harassment of young LGBT people.

== Hazel Nickola ==
While fighting for her license in court, Hazel Nickola's business suffered dramatically, and she was forced to sell her car, piano, and property to pay for her legal fees. She stated, "It's like a strike. Nobody [comes] near me any more. And after all I've done for this town." In 1961, Hazel's Inn was condemned by the city and burned by the fire department.

== See also ==
- Gayola
- Stonewall riots
- Tay-Bush Inn raid
