= Ted northe =

Canadian drag queen

Ted Northe
- Canadian drag queen and activist
- Born: September 13, 1939; Edmonton, Alberta, Canada
- Died: March 30, 2014 (aged 74); Vancouver, British Columbia
- Occupations: Drag queen; civil rights activist
- Known for: Advocacy for decriminalization of homosexuality in Canada; Empress of Canada; Founder of Canadian chapter of Imperial Court System
- Title: Empress of Canada (1964–2014)
- Movement: LGBT rights
- Awards: Vancouver named "ted northe Lane" in his honor (2017)

ted northe (September 13, 1939 – March 30, 2014) was a Canadian drag queen and gay civil rights activist. He advocated for the decriminalization of homosexuality in Canada in the 1950s and 1960s. In 2017, "ted northe Lane" in Vancouver, British Columbia became named after him.

== Background ==
Born in Edmonton, Alberta, Northe grew up in Cooking Lake, Alberta. When he grew older he moved to America where he had hoped to pursue education to become a nurse. In America, Northe began to develop his activism through the connections he made in Los Angeles, San Francisco, and Portland. Portland is where Northe became involved with the Imperial Court System and was crowned as the Empress of Canada by the Rose Court in 1964 and held the title until his death in 2014.

== Career ==
=== Activism ===
His activism was initially inspired by the Black civil rights movement happening in America. On August 18, 1958 Northe organized his first protest on the steps of the Vancouver court house; in total there were five protesters. At this protest, and subsequent events, Northe would always attend in full drag, due to the attention gathered by the then-illegal act of dressing up in drag. In order to avoid arrest he would wear the qualifying three pieces of men's clothing by stuffing his bra with two separate pairs of men's socks, and men's underwear.

During the 1960s, Northe helped organize a national letter writing campaign, that caught the attention of both NDP leader Tommy Douglas, and Justice Minister then Prime Minister Pierre Elliot Trudeau. Having caught the attention of two prominent politicians, he was able to help advocate for the decriminalization of homosexuality. Once bill C-150 was passed in 1969, Trudeau, called Northe infamously requesting to speak with "Your majesty".

=== Drag ===
In the 1971, Northe founded the first Canadian Chapter of the Imperial Court System in Vancouver. The Imperial Court System is a non-profit organization and safe haven for the queer community. As Northe was crowned the empress of Canada in 1964 to formation of the courts of Canada was a natural next step During his time as Empress of Canada he helped raise over ten million dollars for different charities.
