= Nancy Valverde =

American Chicana lesbian activist (1932–2024)

Nancy Valverde (March 5, 1932 – March 25, 2024) was an American Chicana LGBT rights activist and pioneer in Los Angeles, California, who was considered a lesbian icon.

== Early life ==
Born on March 5, 1932, in Deming, New Mexico, to Mexican-American parents, Nancy Valverde and her father moved to Lincoln Heights, then a predominantly Chicano neighborhood in Los Angeles when she was nine years old.

== Work ==
Valverde started working at the age of eleven picking apricots and cotton in Santa Paula and Tulare County, California. At thirteen, she assisted the women who worked in the kitchen at a local neighborhood restaurant, where she continued to work even when the restaurant switched owners and became a Mexican owned bakery. Even though she did not have a driver's license, she worked driving pastry deliveries around Los Angeles. At the age of seventeen, she worked as a manager for an apartment complex, after first working for the apartment complex doing painting jobs. She later became a barber. Since she had not completed her education beyond elementary school, she could not enter barber school, but upon passing an IQ test, she received her barbers license. Though she was paid less than her male colleagues, it was her work at a local barbershop in East Los Angeles that made her famous.

== Personal life ==
Valverde experienced discrimination as a Chicana and as a lesbian. As a masculine presenting woman, with short hair and masculine clothing, she was often harassed by the LAPD, who charged her with violating what were known as masquerading laws, which prohibited men and women from wearing gender nonconforming clothes. Nancy, who identified as a woman, and chose to wear men's clothing for comfort, was often targeted because of her masculine presentation. She was routinely harassed and detained multiple times at Lincoln Heights jail and in a section of the Sybil Brand Institute for women known as the Daddy Tank. The Daddy Tank was a private wing of SBI where masculine presenting women and lesbians were held. After doing research at the Los Angeles County Law Library in 1951, Nancy found legal proof that it was not in fact a crime for a woman to wear men's clothing. Her lawyer used this to end the ongoing arrests.

Despite being known and well liked by community members, she was nonetheless discriminated against for being a lesbian. Even after the police ceased the arrests, they would often knock on the window of her barber shop on Brooklyn Avenue with their nightsticks.

Valverde lived with the same woman for 25 years and raised four boys.

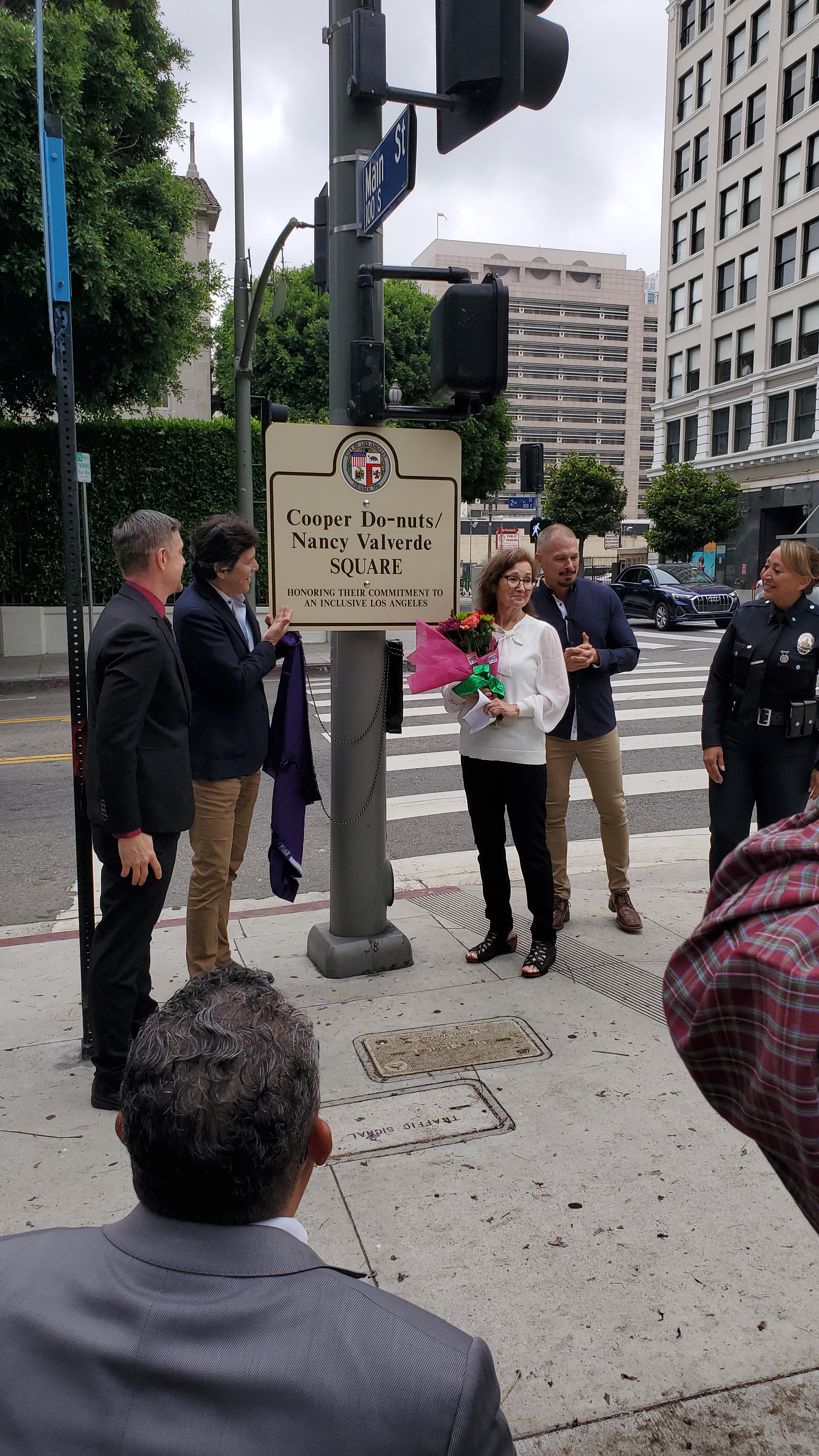
Family, friends and dignitaries in attendance at the unveiling of the commemorative sign for Cooper Do-Nuts/Nancy Valverde Square.

On June 22 and 24, 2023, the intersection of 2nd Street and Main in Downtown Los Angeles was unveiled as Cooper Do-Nuts/Nancy Valverde Square. The unveiling was attended by Nancy's sister and niece, Los Angeles City Councilmember Kevin DeLeon, and Los Angeles Police Department Commander Ruby Flores, who apologized to Nancy and the LGBTQ Community on behalf of the LAPD. Community members and LGBTQ clergy attended the installation of the signs on June 22, 2023.

== Death and Burial ==
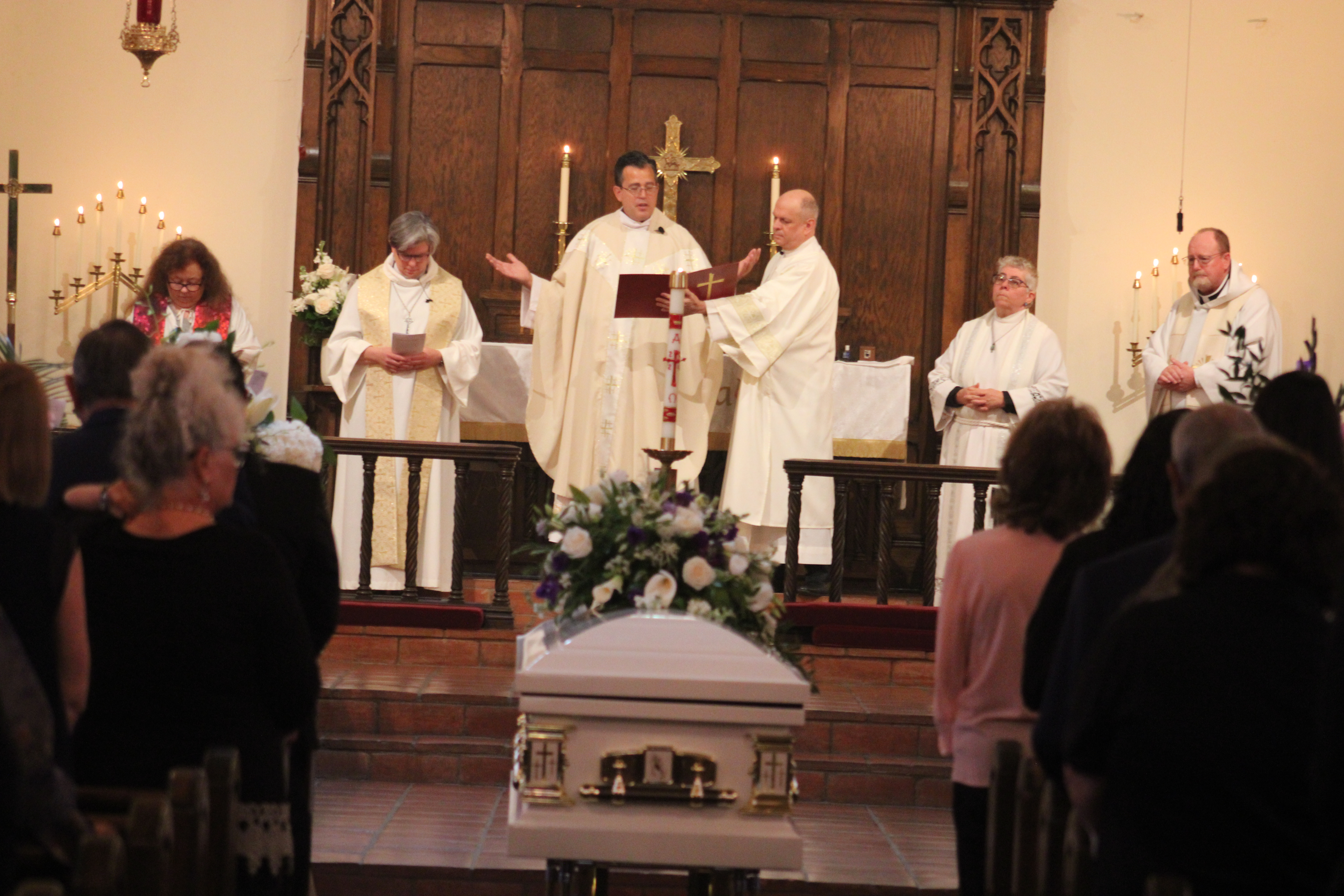
Nancy Valverde's Funeral Mass, with LGBTQ Clergy and Allies concelebrating an interfaith Mass of Christian Burial at Trinity Lutheran Church in Pasadena, California on April 20, 2024

Valverde died at her home in Hollywood, Los Angeles, on March 25, 2024, at the age of 92. Valverde's funeral was celebrated on April 20, 2024 by the Chapel of St. Maximilian Kolbe, an Old Catholic parish nested at Trinity Lutheran Church in Pasadena, California. The Ven. Rev. Dylan Littlefield presided at the interfaith Mass, concelebrated with LGBTQ Clergy and allies, including clergy from the local Dignity chapters. Fr. Dylan shared preaching duties with The Rev. Canon Melissa McCarthy of the Episcopal Diocese of Los Angeles.

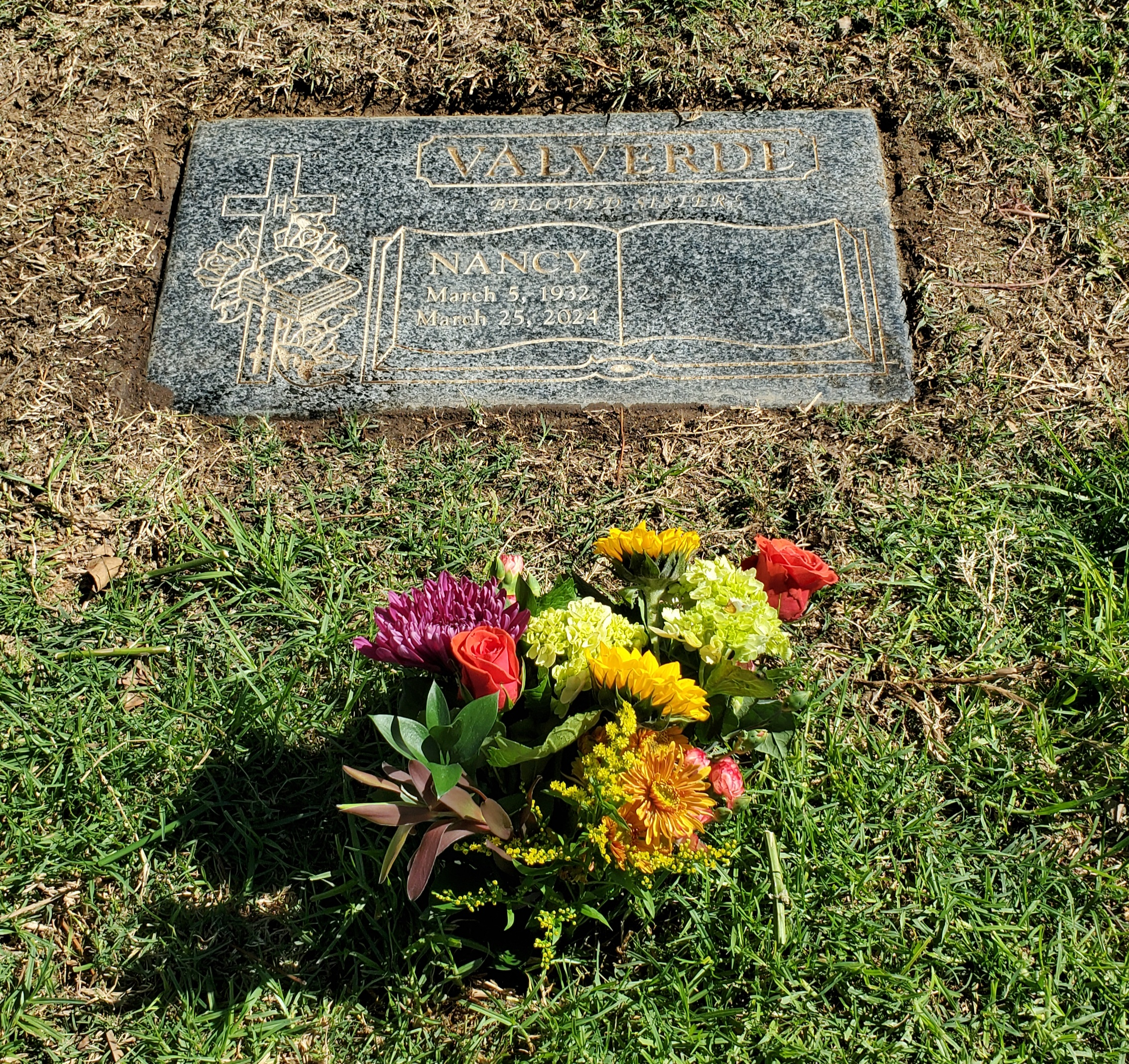
Nancy Valverde's grave site at Resurrection Cemetery in Rosemead, California, with fresh flowers.

Nancy Valverde is buried at Resurrection Cemetery in Rosemead, California. On June 12, 2025, the Old Catholic Union of the West (OCUW) declared Nancy Valverde a Servant of God, marking the first step in the process toward potential canonization. The Union stated that her life "embodies Christ’s presence among the marginalized, mirrors the suffering servant who stands against oppression, and reflects the OCUW’s commitment to justice, inclusion, and honoring the sacred in every life."

== Books, plays, documentaries, features ==
Nancy Valverde has recently become the subject of historians of LGBT histories. She has been featured in a number of documentaries, book chapters, plays, and performances.

- Lillian Faderman & Stuart Timmons, Gay L.A.: A History of Sexual Outlaws, Power Politics, and Lipstick Lesbians. New York: Basic Books, 2006.
- Kunzel, Regina. Criminal Intimacy: Prison and the Uneven History of Modern Sexuality, Chicago and London: University of Chicago Press, 2008.
- Tom De Simone, Teresa Wang, Melissa Lopez, Diem Tran, Andy Sacher, Kersu Dalal, Justin Emerick, Lavender Los Angeles: Roots of Equality, South Carolina: Arcadia Publishing, 2011.
- Karen Tongson, Relocations: Queer Suburban Imaginaries, New York: New York University Press, 2011.
- Marie Carter, Baby, You are My Religion: Women, Gay Bars, and Theology Before Stonewall, London & New York: Taylor & Francis Group Routledge, 2014 (first published 2013 by Acumen).
- "A Gender Variance Who's Who: Essays on trans, intersex, cis and other persons and topics from a trans perspective," Zagria blog post 30 Jan 2013, https://zagria.blogspot.com/2013/01/nancy-valverde-1932-barber.html#.W_AzAehKhnI
- "Nancy From Eastside Clover, Lincoln Heights (Queer History)," Barrio Boychik blog entry June 30, 2017, https://barrioboychik.com/2017/06/30/nancy-from-eastside-clover-lincoln-heights-queer-history-ela/
- Daniel Reynolds, "9 Tales of Young Love and Old Memories: Nine residents of Gay and Lesbian Elder Housing share stories of love from the past and present," Advocate, Aug. 29, 2013, https://www.advocate.com/society/people/2013/08/29/lgbt-seniors-share-9-tales-young-love
- "The Barber of East L.A.," written by Raquel Gutiérrez, . performed by Butchalis de Panochtitlan, 2009.
- Glenne McElhinney (dir), On These Shoulders We Stand, with Nancy Valverde and 10 others. US 75 mins 2009.
- Kimberly Esslinger (dir), The HomoFiles, wr. Marie Cartier, episode 2, 2017.
- Gregorio Davila (dir), LA Queer History, NANCY from East Side CLOVER, 2015.
