= John Rechy =

American writer (born 1931)

- Born: John Francisco Rechy; March 10, 1931 (age 95); El Paso, Texas, U.S.
- Education: University of Texas, El Paso (BA); Columbia University
- Occupations: Novelist; essayist
- Writing career
- Period: 1963–present
- Notable works: City of Night; The Sexual Outlaw; The Miraculous Day of Amalia Gomez
- Military career
- Allegiance: United States
- Branch: United States Army
- Rank: Private
- Website: Official website

John Francisco Rechy (born March 10, 1931) is a Mexican-American novelist and essayist. His novels are written extensively about gay culture in Los Angeles and wider America, among other subject matter. City of Night, his debut novel published in 1963, was a best seller. Drawing on his own background, he has contributed to Mexican-American literature, notably with his novel The Miraculous Day of Amalia Gomez, which has been taught in several Chicano studies courses throughout the United States.

== Early life ==
Rechy was born Juan Francisco Flores Rechy March 10, 1931, in El Paso, Texas. He was the youngest of five children born to Guadalupe (née Flores) and Roberto Sixto Rechy. Both of Rechy's parents were natives of Mexico; his father was of Scottish lineage.

He earned a B.A. in English from Texas Western College (now University of Texas at El Paso), where he served as editor of the college newspaper.

Following graduation from college, Rechy enlisted in the U.S. Army. He was granted early release from the Army to enroll as a graduate student at Columbia University. He applied for admission to a creative writing class taught by novelist Pearl S. Buck by submitting an unpublished draft of a novel he had written titled Pablo! While his application to Buck's class was not accepted, Rechy was admitted into the writing classes of Hiram Haydn, a senior editor at Random House, at the New School for Social Research.

The Cooper Do-nuts Riot happened in 1959 in Los Angeles, when the lesbians, gay men, transgender people, and drag queens who hung out at Cooper Do-nuts and who were frequently harassed by the LAPD fought back after police arrested three people, including Rechy. Patrons began pelting the police with donuts and coffee cups. The LAPD called for back-up and arrested a number of rioters. Rechy and the other two original detainees were able to escape. He later wrote about it in City of Night.

== Literary career ==
Rechy is considered one of Mexican American Literature's founding authors, and based his early writings on Mexican values and cultural problems that were available to him in Mexican films. Though he is probably the best-known gay male Latino writer in the United States, his gay-themed work reflects little of his Mexican-American heritage, except for the surnames of some of his characters.

While Rechy was working on his first novel, installments began to appear in 1958 in literary magazines such as Evergreen Review, Big Table, Nugget, and The London Magazine. These excerpts were fictitious recreations of his life working as a hustler in New York, Los Angeles and New Orleans and appeared alongside writers like Christopher Isherwood, Jack Kerouac and Jean Genet. The largely autobiographical novel City of Night, debuted in October 1963. Despite the predominantly negative reviews the book received at the time of its publication, City of Night became an international bestseller. Alternately, it is also often included on lists of the most banned books in America. Rechy told critic Ronald Martinetti of American Legends website that had the novel been made into a movie, the actor he wanted to play the "main character" was "Young Monty Clift. I liked him very much. I had seen Red River. He was a tremendous actor. So sad."

In addition to have written over a dozen novels, Rechy has contributed numerous essays and literary reviews to various publications including The Nation, The New York Review of Books, Los Angeles Times, L.A. Weekly, The Village Voice, The New York Times, Evergreen Review and Saturday Review. Many of these writings were anthologized in his 2004 publication Beneath the Skin. He has written three plays, Tigers Wild (first performed as The Fourth Angel and based on Rechy's novel of that title), Rushes (based on his novel of the same title), and Momma as She Became—Not as She Was, a one-act play.

Rechy was cited by journalist Amy Harmon in a 2004 New York Times article that reported about a computer glitch on Amazon.com that suddenly revealed the identities of thousands of people who had anonymously posted book reviews. It was revealed that Rechy, among several other authors, had "pseudonymously written themselves five-star reviews, Amazon's highest rating". Amazon stopped accepting anonymous reviews as a result of this finding.

In 2021 Rechy was at work on a new novel entitled Beautiful People at the End of the Line, inspired by "comic books and celebrity culture."

Rechy says of his work, "An early admirer of my work labeled me 'an accidental writer' — the kind who writes randomly, off the top of his head, the way Kerouac is reputed to have done. But that's not true of me. I'm a very conscious writer, attentive to the right word, even the lengths of sentences, and punctuation for effect."

== Personal life ==
Rechy has acknowledged earning money as a sex worker prior to the start of his literary career, and following the success of his first novel. He continued hustling into his forties while also teaching at UCLA, teaching during the day, and hustling at night. Throughout the 1970s and 1980s he dealt with personal drug use, as well as the AIDS crisis, which killed several of his friends.

== Awards, honors and recognition ==
Rechy is the first novelist to receive PEN-USA-West's Lifetime Achievement Award (1997); he is the recipient of the Bill Whitehead Award for Lifetime Achievement from Publishing Triangle (1999) and an NEA fellow. He is a faculty member at the Master of Professional Writing Program at the University of Southern California. He is the first recipient of ONE Magazine Culture Hero Award.

In 2016, he won the first annual Los Angeles Review of Books/UCR Creative Writing Lifetime Achievement Award.

At the 30th Lambda Literary Awards in 2018, he won the Lambda Literary Award for Gay Fiction for After the Blue Hour.

In 2018, Rechy was also awarded with the Robert Kirsch Award for lifetime achievement noting that he is "a major figure in Mexican, LGBTQ and Los Angeles literary communities."

In 2020 The Texas Institute of Letters honored Rechy with its Lon Tinkle Lifetime Achievement Award. TIL President Carmen Tafolla called Rechy's work "a significant turning point in modern American literature, and a prose so poetically crafted it sharpens our perception of both the beauty and the ache of the human experience."

== Legacy ==
Writers Michael Cunningham, Kate Braverman, Sandra Tsing Loh, and Gina Nahai were students of Rechy's creative writing classes before becoming published authors.

Rechy's contributions to women-centered narratives and the Chicana feminist canon are reflected in many of his works. Maria DeGuzman argues in her book, Understanding John Rechy, that "his decolonial Chicana feminist representations of women indicate the fact that he has long understood the relationship that exists between misogyny and homophobia (against gay men as well as against LGBTQ+ more generally). The oppression of women and trans women (for example, "Troja" in Marilyn's Daughter) is not just about Latinx communities; it is, in Rechy's work, also about the larger U.S. culture."

English pop artist David Hockney's painting Building, Pershing Square, Los Angeles was inspired by a passage in City of Night.

The 1983 song "Numbers" by the English synth-pop duo Soft Cell was inspired by Rechy's 1967 novel of the same title.

A CD-ROM of Rechy's life and work was produced by the Annenberg Center of Communications and is titled Mysteries and Desire: Searching the Worlds of John Rechy.

In 2019 the Wittliff Collection at Texas State University acquired Rechy's complete archive stating, "This treasure trove of letters serves as a virtual diary of one of the most significant periods in Rechy's personal and literary life"

Other artists who have acknowledged Rechy's influence include David Bowie, Jim Morrison, Bob Dylan and Tom Waits.

== Bibliography ==
=== Novels ===
- City of Night (Grove Press, 1963)
- Numbers (Grove Press, 1967)
- This Day's Death (Grove Press, 1969)
- The Vampires (Grove Press, 1971)
- The Fourth Angel (Viking, 1972)
- Rushes (Grove Press, 1979)
- Bodies and Souls (Carroll & Graf, 1983)
- Marilyn's Daughter (Carroll & Graf, 1988)
- The Miraculous Day of Amalia Gomez (Arcade, 1991)
- Our Lady of Babylon (Arcade, 1996)
- The Coming of the Night (Grove Press, 1999)
- The Life and Adventures of Lyle Clemens (Grove Press, 2003)
- After the Blue Hour (Grove Press, 2017)
- Pablo! (Arte Público Press, 2018)

=== Non-fiction ===
- The Sexual Outlaw (Grove Press, 1977)
- Beneath the Skin (Carroll & Graf, 2004)
- About My Life and the Kept Woman (Grove Press, 2008) (memoir)
