= Dance permit =

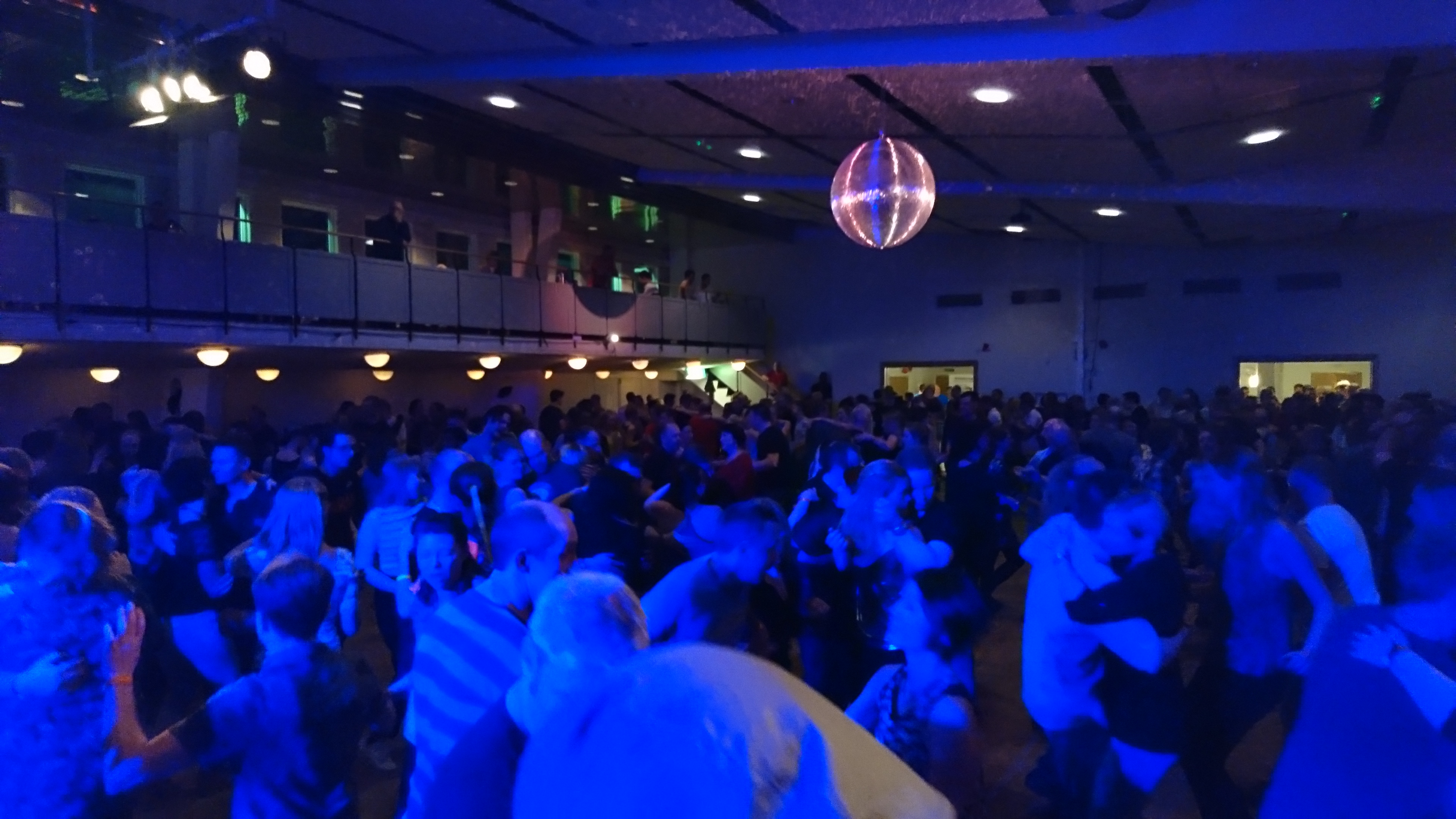
Social dancing in Härnösand, Sweden.

Dance permit is a permit required for dancing.

== Dance permit in Sweden ==
Since the 1930s a dance permit (danstillstånd) is required for public dance events in Sweden per the law of order (2 kap. 4 § ordningslagen 1993:1617).

Filing for a dance permit is associated with a fee of 700 SEK (2014) for the establishment. Establishment lacking such permit must prevent guests from dancing, for example by stopping the music. The police may take photographs and films of patrons moving in sync with the music in a dance like way. These photos and films may later be used as evidence of a crime if the establishment is lacking the required permit.

Proponents of the law, including the Swedish police, highlighted the security aspect.

In 2016, the Riksdag (the national legislature and the supreme decision-making body of Sweden) voted unanimously to abolish the requirement for a dance permit for non-public places but the law existed and was enforced for several more years. The law was changed on 1 July 2023: since then, permits are still required for public events and gatherings, but establishments must still report dance events to the police in advance, however free of charge.

There is still a requirement to apply for permits for public gatherings and events to the police and pay an application fee.

== See also ==
- Dancing ban
