= Imperial Court System =

One of the oldest and largest LGBT organizations in the world

Imperial Court System logo

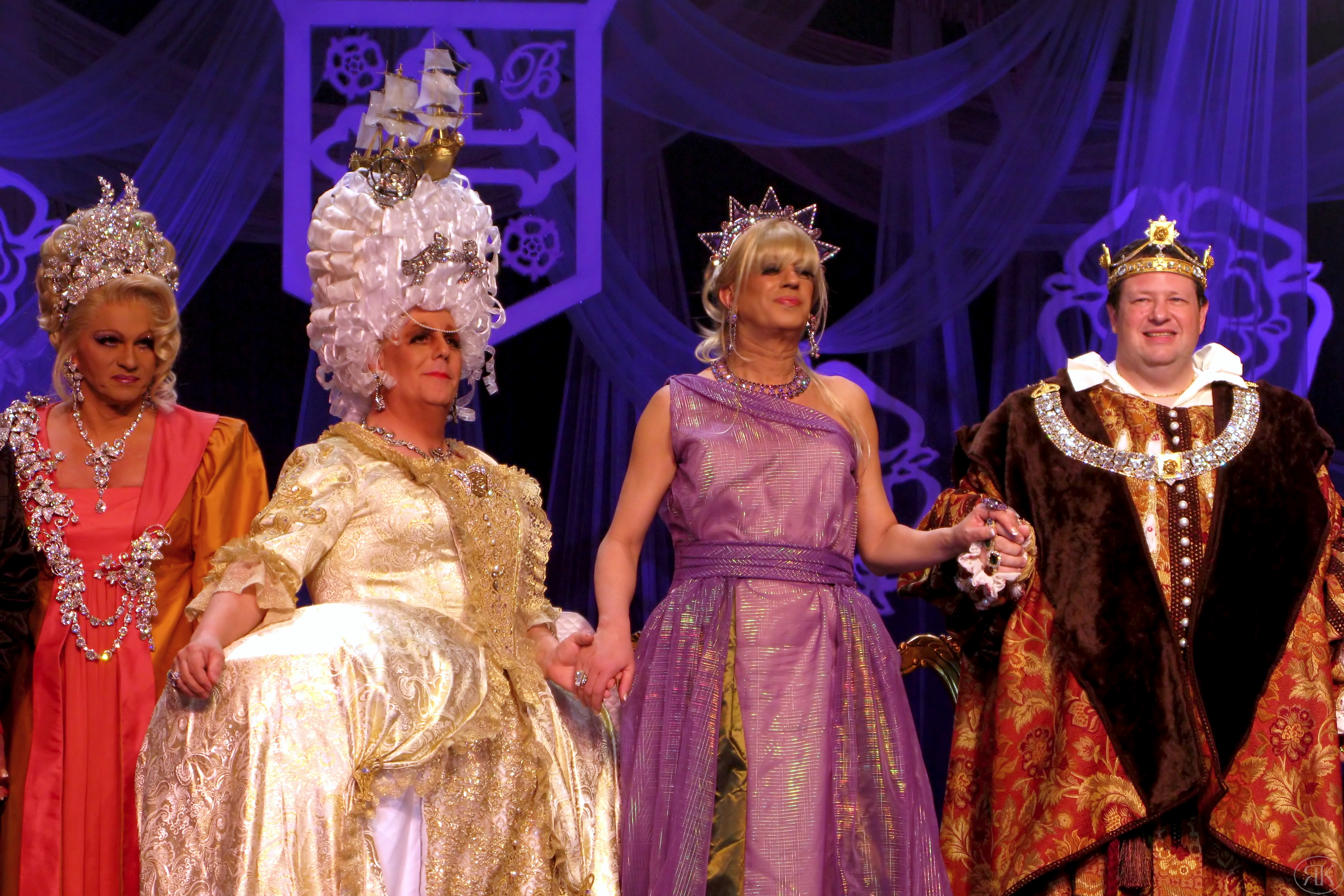
The Imperial Court of New York's annual Night of a Thousand Gowns Coronation Ball in Times Square. Craig Hollywood, the 2007 emperor, with his current and two prior empresses.

The Imperial Court of New York's annual Night of a Thousand Gowns Coronation Ball in Times Square (2008)

The International Imperial Court System (IICS) also known as the International Court System is one of the oldest and largest LGBT organizations in the world. The Imperial Court System is a grassroots network of organizations that works to build community relationships for equality and raise money for charitable causes through the production of annual Gala Coronation Balls that invite an unlimited audience of attendees to be presented at Royal Court in their fanciest attire throughout North America along with numerous other fundraisers each year, all for the benefit of their communities. The Imperial Court System is the second largest LGBT organization in the world, surpassed only by the Metropolitan Community Church.

== History ==
The Imperial Court System in the United States was founded in San Francisco, California, in 1965 by José Sarria. Sarria, affectionately known as "Mama José" or similar among Imperial Court members, adopted the stage name "Widow Norton" as a reference to Joshua Norton, a much-celebrated citizen of 19th-century San Francisco who had declared himself Emperor of the United States and Protector of Mexico in 1859.

Sarria soon became the nexus of a fundraising group with volunteer members bearing titles of nobility bestowed by yearly elected figurehead leaders of Emperor and Empress. In the United States, the first court outside of San Francisco was in Portland, Oregon, which joined with San Francisco in 1971 to start the Court System, followed by Seattle, and then by Vancouver (by the Empress of Canada, ted northe, who was crowned Empress of Canada in 1964 by the long-standing Rose Court of Portland Oregon and who always spelled his name in the lower case), who founded the Canadian Court System in 1971, after being inspired by attending a ball in Portland OR, and thus became the International Court System). These empires operated and formed policies more-or-less independently until an Imperial Court Council led by Sarria was formed to prevent participation by groups that were not strictly and solely involved with charitable fundraising.

For years, some chapters of the Canadian Imperial Courts remained outside the recognition of the Widow Norton and the Imperial Court Council for various reasons, some regulatory and some related to dispute over northe's title. Eventually ICS leadership recognized northe as The Empress of All Canada, which ended a substantial falling out between ted northe and the international court system. In 1997, northe was among the first recipients of the "José Honors Award" handed out by Sarria.

Infrequently, a schism within a court chapter has given rise to a "rogue court" unrecognized by the organization as a whole. Most of these so-called "rogue courts" or "rival courts" have collapsed and dissolved within a few years.

== Structure ==
Each individual court chapter (or "Empire") is a separate, legally-incorporated charitable nonprofit organization that raises funds and awareness for various charities and civic causes for people in need within its realm. Each chapter has its own board of directors and is financially responsible for its own management. In addition to local non-profit status, many courts in the United States have Federal 501(c) status.

The Imperial Court Council, created in 1995, is an incorporated non-profit organization created to advise chapters of the Imperial Court System and, when necessary, to grant or rescind recognition by the ICS as a whole. The council also urges a degree of consistency regarding matters of protocol via proclamations which are generally observed by all chapters.

On 17 February 2007, Sarria (who turned 84 years old in December 2006) officially passed the leadership of the ICS to Empress Nicole the Great of San Diego, CA (real name Nicole Murray-Ramirez), who held the designation of Heir Apparent 1st in Line of Succession, in a ceremony held in Seattle, Washington.

Nicole the Great has been the titular leader of the ICS since. She uses the title of "Queen Mother I of the Americas" and has been assisted in this capacity by her Privy Council made up of Empress Coco LaChine of New York, NY, Emperor Rick Ford of Long Beach, California, Empress Milo of San Diego, California, Empress Jack-E of Reno, Nevada, Empress Panzi of New York, New York, Empress Remy Martin of San Francisco, and other Imperial Court Council members. Queen Mother Nicole the Great has created her own line of succession replacing those formerly so designated by Sarria. Like those monarchs in the former line of succession, these "Heirs Apparent" comprise the current day International Court Council.

After ted northe's death in May 2014, Avaughna Sanoir was selected as the new Empress of Canada in June. This title is currently not recognized by the ICS as of September 2014.

Juanita More served as Empress of San Francisco.

== Chapters ==
The Imperial Court System over the past almost fifty years has grown to represent communities in 86 different locations across the United States, Canada, and Mexico. Some realms cover entire states, such as Alaska, Connecticut, Hawaii, Iowa or Montana while others cover cities such as the city of Toronto or Buffalo, NY, counties or regions, the communities of Alameda County, California or the Greater Niagara Region.

Most chapters are Imperial Courts and are also known as "Empires". A few chapters are called "ducal court" (infrequently called a "duchy") or "barony" (infrequently called a "baronial court"). The term ducal court is typically used in the rare situation when one chapter's area overlaps with the territory of an already established chapter, as is the case with the Grand Ducal Council of San Francisco and the Grand Ducal Council of Alameda. The term barony is typically used when a new chapter has yet to fully be elevated to the level of infrastructure and successful fundraising characteristic with those chapters deemed full-fledged Imperial Courts. Except for the titles used by the monarchs (i.e. baroness rather than empress, etc.) baronial and ducal chapters function in essentially the same way as those chapters headed by Emperors and Empresses.

Indicative of the ICS's growth in the 1990s, three of North America's largest metropolitan areas -- Boston, Chicago, and Washington, DC, – established baronies which have since become prominent and successful Imperial Courts.

As the oldest chapter in the organization, the Imperial Court of San Francisco is considered the "Mother Court" of the Imperial Court System. The term "Mother Court" is also used for a court chapter who grants the recognition and establishment a new court. For example, the Imperial Court of New York is the Mother Court of the Imperial Court of Rhode Island at Providence.

== Titles ==
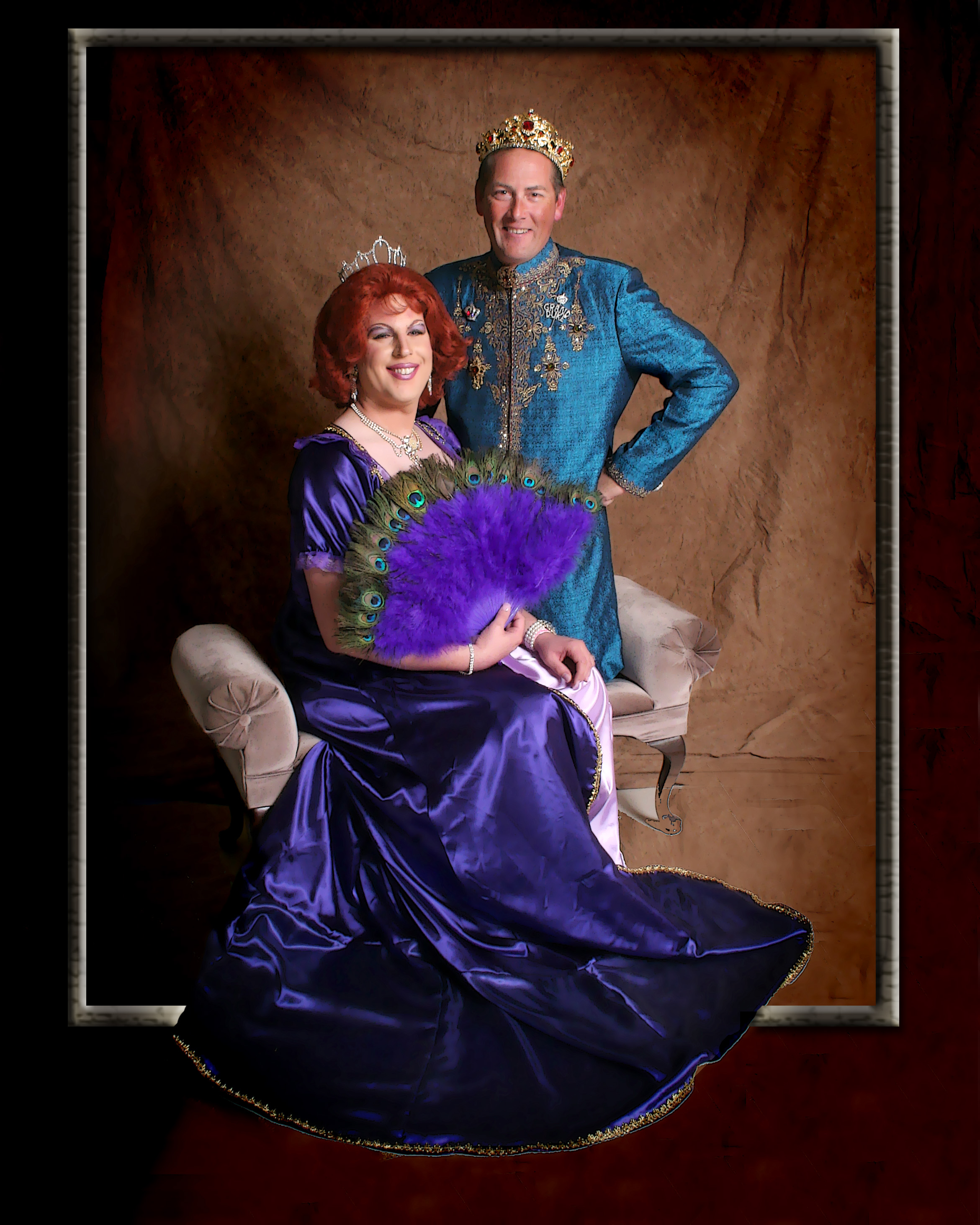
Grand Duchess and Duke XVIII Vivian Lee St. Michael and Ken St. Michael of the Royal Grand Ducal of Alameda and Contra Costa Counties (CA) (2009)

Each court holds an annual "coronation" (or "adornment" in the case of baronies and ducal courts) which is usually the chapter's largest fundraiser and is attended by both local people and members of other chapters from across North America. The evening culminates with the ceremony in which the new monarch or monarchs are crowned. The method by which monarchs are selected varies from chapter to chapter, ranging from election by vote among the active membership in closed session to election by open vote of the community region in which individuals are residents...held between one week to up to six months before the coronation to election by all in attendance on the night of the ceremony.

The office of monarch is taken very seriously within the court system and requires a large commitment of the holder's time and money. Accordingly, while the presence of an "imperial couple" is the norm, it is not uncommon for an emperor or empress to reign alone depending on the availability of suitably dedicated and charismatic candidates with the necessary resources to fulfil the requirements of a one-year reign.

In the most frequent case, several weeks after coronation the new monarch or monarchs present their court titles at a fundraiser called investitures. The titles given to members vary from one chapter to another and are primarily left to the discretion of the reigning monarch or monarchs, the fons honorum (fountain of honor) of their chapter.

Typical titles awarded are Imperial Crown Prince, Grand Duchess, Marquess, Viscount, etc. Other appellations bestowed resemble offices or professions within a medieval or modern noble court rather than titles of nobility, such as "Court Jester" or "Chancellor of the Realm" and so forth. These titles may be as serious-sounding or as humorously campy as the monarchs wish.

Titles are traditionally based upon those used by European nobility (especially the British Peerage) but nothing prohibits the creation of titles such as Czarina, Raja or Sultan and these are sometimes used as well.

Noble titles are ranked according to an order of precedence so that, for example, a member who has been created a duke takes precedence over a member who has been created a countess. The main effect of this hierarchy involves the order that members are introduced during "protocol", a ceremonial procedure endemic to the Imperial Court in which courts are presented with courtiers' titles read by the master of ceremonies as members approach the presiding monarchs of the coronation. This bit of pageantry, which is typically reserved for coronations and similar large events, gives Imperial Court members an opportunity to display their titles as well as costumes to the assembled crowd.

Monarchs, both reigning and former, are typically allowed to create various societies, clubs, houses, fraternities, sororities and so forth. These are typically for the sole purpose of granting membership to people they wish to honor. Many of these have colorful names that are either grandiose, humorous or both. Examples include the House of Fairies, Friends and Frivolity, the Order of the Far East, The Society of the Crown and Scepter, "La Casa De Milagros" – The House of Miracles, etc. In some cases, membership is exclusive; in other cases, it is granted relatively indiscriminately. Unlike titles, these memberships are rarely if ever regulated by chapters' by-laws or boards of directors.

Similar to society memberships are "family titles" such as the Foxx Family Den or the Surreal Family Dynasty. Monarchs often name people as sons, daughters, brothers, uncles, and so forth. These are likewise typically unregulated within the system and may be granted as freely or as sparingly as a monarch wishes.

== Fundraising ==
Due to the decentralized nature of the organization and inconsistent record keeping in some chapters early in their histories, it is difficult to estimate the total amount of money raised by the ICS. Proceeds from the Imperial Court of New York City's renowned "Night of a Thousand Gowns" have resulted in as much as $67,000 donated to its charitable recipients in a single weekend. Since its inception, the Imperial Court de San Diego has raised at least $1 million. In 2008 (Reign 22), The Imperial Court of Toronto awarded their charities $60,000 under Emperor 22 Hunter James and Empress 22 Tiffany Louise-Charles.

Each court conducts numerous fundraisers throughout the year. Drag shows, ranging in size from performances at local bars to events in hotel ballrooms and other large venues, are the main way in which revenue is raised for charity. Especially in recent years, court chapters have diversified their fundraising strategies to include yard sales, gift raffles, etc. Court members also solicit donations at LGBTQ events, gay pride parades and other public events.

Imperial Court chapters donate the funds raised to a variety of causes including those related to AIDS, breast cancer, domestic abuse, and homelessness. Empires have also established or contributed to a variety of scholarships. Court chapters receive frequent recognition by elected officials and celebrities for their humanitarian contributions.

Unlike many other large charitable fundraising organizations, the Imperial Court System is composed entirely of volunteers. There are no paid positions within the Imperial Court System and both the culture of the Court System and the regulations set down by the boards of directors of each chapter prohibit any member from profiting from the Imperial Court or its activities. Rather, depending on individual level of involvement with the system, many court members spend hundreds or thousands of dollars of their own money each year on costumes, travel to events in other parts of North America, and donations to various charitable beneficiaries.

== Membership ==
Most members are homosexual and transgender people, but membership is open to all. Gay, bisexual, transgender and straight people have all served as monarchs and court members. Drag queens and other sorts of cross-dressers collectively comprise about half of the membership.

The Court System also appeals to people interested in various forms of costume and dress-up who are willing to lend their enthusiasm to the court's culture of charitable fundraising. Included among these are people involved with the leather fetishism and leather subcultures, members of the Society for Creative Anachronism and similar historical reenactment hobbyists, various types of cosplay enthusiasts, and so on.

Most court members, especially monarchs, past-monarchs and those aspiring towards a throne, wear an assortment of regalia including elaborate crowns, bejeweled chains of office and other costume jewelry which is often custom-made for the wearer.

== Related groups ==
Many court members are involved with other LGBT groups, especially non-profit groups that provide charitable services directly rather than providing the funds for such services as ICS does. Besides these, two specific spheres of activity have relevance to ICS history:

Competitive pageantry: Some court members have also been involved with competitive pageantry, especially drag pageants and the various leather competitions through which people may qualify for International Mister Leather. Like the ICS, these competitions provide an opportunity to garner titles while showcasing one's appearance and talents. Some court chapters grew out of the sphere of competitive pageantry and some courts conduct annual competitive "Mr. Gay. .." and "Miss Gay. .." (or similarly named) pageants as part of their fundraising schedule.

Ball culture: Less frequently, the Imperial Court System has had overlapping membership and joint ventures with drag houses of the type documented in Paris is Burning. For example, during the 1990s the annual "Snow Ball" in Hartford was both a coronation and a competition in which contestants did "walks" in various specific categories in order to win trophies. The ICS has innumerable "houses" within its ranks as mentioned above. However, unlike ballroom scene houses such as The House of Xtravaganza and House of Labeija, houses within the IICS are not an important means of organization within the group and there is no limit to the number of houses to which a person can belong.

== See also ==
- List of LGBT-related organizations
- Drag ball
- LGBTQ culture in Tijuana
