= Stoumen v. Reilly =

California Supreme Court case on gay bars

- Court: California Supreme Court
- Decided: August 28, 1951
- Citations: ; 37 Cal.2d 713 (Cal. 1951) 234 P.2d 969

Case history
- Subsequent action: Allowance of "disorderly house" as long as no immoral actions occur

Court membership
- Chief judge: Phil S. Gibson
- Associate judges: John W. Shenk, Douglas L. Edmonds, Jesse W. Carter, Roger J. Traynor, B. Rey Schauer, Homer R. Spence

Case opinions
- Concurrence: Shenk, joined by Edmonds, Carter, Traynor, Schauer, and Spence

Stoumen v Reilly, 37 Cal.2d 713 (C.A. 1951), is a California Supreme Court case that determined that gay bars were not outright against the law as long as no illegal or immoral acts occurred on the premise. By many accounts, this case is one of the first landmark victories for gay civil rights. All seven judges agreed with the ruling in favor of the plaintiff retaining their business and liquor licenses.

== Lawsuit ==
In 1949, the California State Board of Equalization (BOE) suspended the liquor license of the Black Cat. This bohemian bar and restaurant in San Francisco was accused of permitting "persons of known homosexual tendencies" to gather. Owner of the Black Cat Sol Stoumen appealed the suspension to the Supreme Court of California on the grounds that the effeminate nature of some patrons did not constitute legal action. The plaintiff argued against defendant George R. Reilly, a representative for the BOE.

== Decision ==
On August 28, 1951, the justices permitted that human beings are entitled to food and shelter, "and mere proof of patronage, without proof of the commission of illegal or immoral acts on the premises, or resort thereto for such purposes, is not sufficient to show a violation of section 58." The suspension of Stoumen's license would require more substantial proof of the Black Cat being used as a "disorderly house" than his patrons being homosexuals and using the bar as a meeting place. "There was no evidence of any illegal or immoral conduct on the premises or that the patrons resorted to the restaurant for purposes injurious to public morals".

Stoumen's other charge, selling alcohol to a person under twenty-one, was not revoked by this case. His license was suspended for 30 days on this charge alone.

=== Concurrence ===
All seven justices were in concurrence on revoking the suspension of Stoumen's liquor license. Chief Justice Phil S. Gibson articulated the following: "Unlike evidence that an establishment is reputed to be a house of prostitution, which means a place where prostitution is practiced and thus necessarily implies the doing of illegal or immoral acts on the premises, testimony that a restaurant and bar is reputed to be a meeting place for a certain class of persons contains no such implication."

== Legislative response ==
Following this victory for the queer community, California state legislature adopted new laws that allowed for the removal of licenses from establishments that housed sexual perverts, prostitutes, pimps, or panderers. Although these laws didn't outright refer to homosexuals, they were utilized against gay bars until 1959, when they were deemed unconstitutional.

== See also ==
- LGBT rights in California
- LGBT history in the United States
