= California Department of Alcoholic Beverage Control =

Department within the California state government

Department of Alcoholic Beverage Control
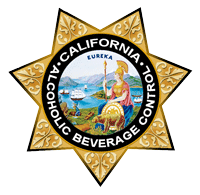
- Seal of the California Department of Alcoholic Beverage Control

Department overview
- Formed: January 1, 1955; 71 years ago
- Jurisdiction: California
- Headquarters: Sacramento, California
- Employees: 210 Sworn
- Annual budget: $84.6 Million
- Department executive: Eric Hirata, Director
- Parent department: Business, Consumer Services and Housing Agency
- Website: abc.ca.gov

The California Department of Alcoholic Beverage Control (ABC) is a government agency of the state of California that regulates the manufacture, distribution, and sale of alcoholic beverages.

== Background/History ==
Upon the repeal of Prohibition in 1933 and the return of the legal sale of alcoholic beverages to California, taxation and regulation of the manufacture, distribution, and sale of alcoholic beverages were given to the State Board of Equalization. In 1955, an amendment to the state constitution was enacted which removed the duty of regulating the manufacture and sale of alcoholic beverages from the State Board of Equalization and placing it in the new Department of Alcoholic Beverage Control.

The department is headed by a director appointed by the governor of California, and its two divisions are divided into districts based on population and geographical needs.

The department's workload is divided into three elements: administration, licensing, and compliance. The Department's Headquarters in Sacramento consists of the Director's office and other offices performing licensing, fiscal management, legal, trade practices, training, and personnel/labor relations and other administrative support functions for the department.

Agents and/or Licensing Representatives investigate applications for licenses to sell alcoholic beverages and report on the moral character and fitness of applicants and the suitability of premises where sales are to be conducted. These reports are reviewed at the District Office and are forwarded to Headquarters in Sacramento for further review and processing. If the license is denied, or if its issuance is protested, the applicant is entitled to a hearing before an Administrative Law Judge. After hearing the evidence, the Administrative Law Judge makes a proposed decision which is reviewed by the Legal Section of the department and acted upon by the Director.

ABC Agents are peace officers under Section 830.2 of the California Penal Code and are empowered to investigate and make arrests for violations of the Business and Professions Code that occur on or about licensed premises. Agents are further empowered to enforce any penal provisions of the law any place in the State. Licensees who violate State laws or local ordinances are subject to disciplinary action and may have their licenses suspended or revoked. These licensees are entitled to a hearing before an Administrative Law Judge and an appellate process to the State Supreme Court.

== AB 1221 ==
In 2017, the Legislature amended the Alcoholic Beverage Control Act to require the department to establish mandatory training courses for alcohol servers by July 1, 2021: the Responsible Beverage Service (RBS) Training Program.

== See also ==
- Black Cat bar (police harassment)
