= Annual Reminder =

LGBTQ demonstrations in Philadelphia, United States

The Annual Reminders were a series of early pickets organized by gay organizations, held yearly from 1965 through 1969. The Reminder took place each July 4 at Independence Hall in Philadelphia and were among the earliest LGBTQ demonstrations in the United States. The events were designed to inform and remind the American people that gay people did not enjoy basic civil rights protections.

The Reminders were held each year from 1965 through 1969, with the final picket taking place shortly after the June 28 Stonewall riots, considered the flashpoint of the modern gay liberation movement. Reminder organizers decided to discontinue the July 4 pickets at this point, and shifted their focus to organizing the Christopher Street Liberation Day demonstration held June 28, 1970, to commemorate the anniversary of the riot. This became the first Gay Pride Parade.

== Origin ==
Jack Nichols (left) pickets Independence Hall on July 4, 1965, at the first Annual Reminder

The Second Largest Minority, a 1968 documentary of the fourth Annual Reminder

Activist Craig Rodwell conceived of the event following a picket at the White House on April 17, 1965, by members of the New York City and Washington, D.C. chapters of the Mattachine Society, Philadelphia's Janus Society, and the New York chapter of the Daughters of Bilitis. The groups operated under the collective name East Coast Homophile Organizations (ECHO). The name of the event was selected to remind the American people that a substantial number of American citizens were denied the rights of "life, liberty, and the pursuit of happiness" enumerated in the United States Declaration of Independence.

Enthused by Rodwell's idea, ECHO put together the first Reminder picket in just over two months. Thirty-nine people attended the first picket, including veteran activists Frank Kameny, Barbara Gittings, and Kay Tobin. Kameny insisted on a strict dress code for participants, including jackets and ties for the men and dresses for the women. Kameny's goal was to represent homosexuals as "presentable and 'employable'".

Picketers carried signs with such slogans as "HOMOSEXUAL BILL OF RIGHTS" and "15 MILLION HOMOSEXUAL AMERICANS ASK FOR EQUALITY, OPPORTUNITY, DIGNITY". The picket ran from 3:30 until 5:00 PM. Press coverage was sparse, although Confidential magazine ran a large feature about the Reminder and other homophile pickets in its October 1965 issue under the headline "Homos On The March".

== Final Reminder ==
The Annual Reminder continued through July 4, 1969. This final Reminder occurred in the immediate aftermath of the Stonewall riots, where patrons of a Greenwich Village gay bar fought against police raiding the Stonewall Inn on June 28. Rodwell received several telephone calls threatening him and the other New York participants, but he was able to arrange for police protection for the chartered bus all the way to Philadelphia. About 45 people participated, including the deputy mayor of Philadelphia and his wife.

The dress code was still in effect at the Reminder, but two women from the New York contingent broke from the single-file picket line and held hands. When Kameny tried to break them apart, Rodwell furiously denounced him to onlooking members of the press. Similarly to Stonewall, most of the major Philadelphia newspapers failed to cover the Annual Reminder, with limited notice in Philadelphia Tribune, Distant Drummer, and the Temple Free Press.

Following the 1969 Annual Reminder, there was a sense, particularly among the younger and more radical participants, that the time for silent picketing had passed. As Frank Kameny put it, "[P]icketing as such had become questionable. Dissent and dissatisfaction had begun to take new and more emphatic forms in society." At the November 1–2, 1969 meeting of the Eastern Regional Conference of Homophile Organizations (the successor to ECHO), Ellen Broidy of the NYU Student Homophile League presented Craig Rodwell's proposal for a new commemorative demonstration. The conference passed a resolution drafted by Rodwell, his partner Fred Sargeant, Broidy and Linda Rhodes to move the demonstration from July 4 in Philadelphia to the last weekend in June in New York City, as well as proposing to "other organizations throughout the country... suggest(ing) that they hold parallel demonstrations on that day" to commemorate the Stonewall riots. The newly-located event in New York City became known as Christopher Street Liberation Day.

== Commemoration ==
Portion of "Pride and Progress" mural (by Ann Northrup, located on the side of the William Way LGBT Community Center at 1315 Spruce Street, Philadelphia) that depicts a poster which itself depicts part of the Annual Reminder picket held in 1966. In the poster, Barbara Gittings is the woman in the light gray dress behind the part of the banner that says JULY; her sign says "SUPPORT HOMOSEXUAL CIVIL RIGHTS".

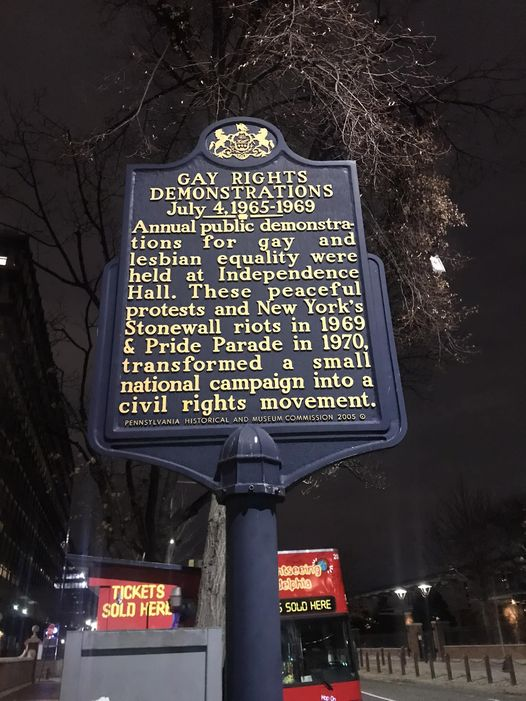
Pennsylvania state historical marker commemorating the Annual Reminders, placed by the Pennsylvania Historical and Museum Commission at 6th and Chestnut Streets in 2005.

As part of the mural "Pride and Progress" by Ann Northrup (located on the side of the William Way LGBT Community Center at 1315 Spruce Street, Philadelphia) there is a depiction of a man pasting up a poster that itself depicts part of the Annual Reminder picket held in 1966; the poster features Barbara Gittings among others.

The Annual Reminders were commemorated in 2005 by the placement of a Pennsylvania state historical marker by the Pennsylvania Historical and Museum Commission at 6th and Chestnut Streets.

On July 4, 2015, the first Annual Reminder was recreated as part of the celebration of the action's 50th anniversary.

== In fiction ==
The 1995 film Stonewall presents a fictionalized Annual Reminder. However, the film sets the Reminder earlier in the summer, predating the June 28 Stonewall riots.

== See also ==
- Homophile movement
- LGBTQ rights in Pennsylvania
- Pride parade
