= Alan Sears =

Alan Sears may refer to:

- Alan E. Sears, American lawyer
- Alan Sears (sociologist), Canadian sociologist
