= Barry D. Adam =

Canadian sociologist and author

Barry Douglas Adam (born 1952 in Yorkton, Saskatchewan) is Distinguished University Professor Emeritus of Sociology at the University of Windsor and from 2008 to 2019, Senior Scientist at the Ontario HIV Treatment Network in Toronto. Educated at Simon Fraser University (BAHon 1972) and the University of Toronto (PhD 1977) and trained as a sociologist, he is the author of: The Survival of Domination, The Rise of a Gay and Lesbian Movement (1978, revised 1995), and with Alan Sears, Experiencing HIV. He later co-edited The Global Emergence of Gay and Lesbian Politics (1999). He has an extensive research record on the dynamics of domination and empowerment, LGBT studies, HIV prevention, and issues of living with HIV and AIDS, and was a co-founder of the AIDS Committee of Windsor, Ontario.

Recent work has been grounded in community-based research projects to better discern the social networks at the leading edges of the HIV epidemic, to identify the discursive strands and reasoning processes circulating among vulnerable populations, and to work toward health system reform to better coordinate mental health, addictions, and primary care resources to address syndemic conditions and better use new prevention technologies. The theoretical underpinnings of this work have appeared in such papers as: "Domination, resistance, and subjectivity" in The Blackwell Companion to Social Inequalities (2005), "Epistemic fault lines in biomedical and social approaches to HIV prevention," in the Journal of the International AIDS Society (2011), and "Neoliberalism, masculinity, and HIV risk" published in Sexuality Research and Social Policy (2016).

In 2006, he received a Career Scientist Award in Risk, Culture and Sexuality from the Ontario HIV Treatment Network and in 2007, the Simon-Gagnon Award for a distinguished career in the study of sexualities, presented by the Sociology of Sexualities Section of the American Sociological Association. In 2012, he received the Community Partners Award of the Ontario AIDS Network, in 2013 the Queen's Diamond Jubilee Medal, in 2015 the Career Award for outstanding contributions to the Sociology of HIV/AIDS, presented by the Sociologists AIDS Network of the American Sociological Association, and in 2017 the Anselm Strauss award from the U.S. National Council on Family Relations for an article published in the Journal of Marriage and the Family.

In a 2012 interview with the Community-Based Research Centre, Adam explained that his research primarily used qualitative methods, although he also participated in quantitative studies.
