= Craig Rodwell =

American gay rights activist (1940-1993)

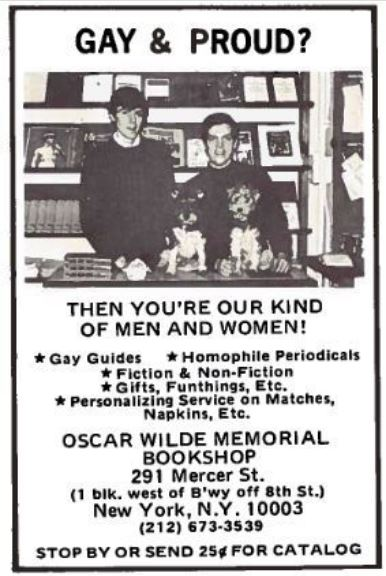
- Rodwell (right) with his partner, Fred Sargeant, in the Oscar Wilde Memorial Bookshop
- Born: Craig Louis Rodwell; October 31, 1940; Chicago, Illinois, U.S.
- Died: June 18, 1993 (aged 52); New York City, New York, U.S.
- Occupations: Activist and bookshop proprietor
- Known for: Founding Oscar Wilde Memorial Bookshop and proposed the first annual Gay Pride March, then called Christopher Street Liberation Day
- Honors: Lambda Literary Award for Publisher's Service, in the inaugural fifty American "pioneers, trailblazers, and heroes" inducted on the National LGBTQ Wall of Honor within the Stonewall National Monument

Craig L. Rodwell (October 31, 1940 – June 18, 1993) was an American gay rights activist known for founding the Oscar Wilde Memorial Bookshop on November 24, 1967 - the first bookstore devoted to gay and lesbian authors - and as the prime mover for the creation of the New York City gay pride demonstration. Rodwell, who was already an activist when he participated in the 1969 Stonewall uprising, is considered by some to be the leading gay rights activist in the early, pre-Stonewall, homophile movement of the 1960s.

== Early life ==
Rodwell was born in Chicago, Illinois. His parents separated prior to his first birthday and for the next few years he was boarded out for day care where he was required to do kitchen labor and laundry to supplement his board and care. When he was six years old, Rodwell's mother, Marion Kastman, fearing that the child care set up could cause her to lose custody of her son, arranged for his admission to the Christian Scientist affiliated Chicago Junior School (later called the Fox River Country Day School) for "problem" boys, in Elgin, Illinois. Although same-sex relationships were highly discouraged at the all-boys school, they were quite common. Rodwell got a reputation for being a rebellious child during his seven years at the school, but had good memories from the school despite its sometimes "Dickensian" aspects such as corporal punishment. It was at Chicago Junior School that Rodwell first experienced same-sex relationships and also came to internalize Christian Science ideals. He realized there that "telling the truth" was "always the best policy."

From 13 to 14 years old, Rodwell had sex with hundreds of men in Chicago whom he met while cruising outside of gay bars. He later said, “This is what I lived for, literally.” When Rodwell was 14, he was charged and convicted by the Chicago police for juvenile delinquency when he was caught walking home after having sex with a man in his thirties. He was sentenced to two years of probation.

After graduating from the Chicago Junior School, Rodwell attended Sullivan High School in Chicago. Rodwell continued studying Christian Science by enrolling in Sunday school at the 16th Church of Christ, Scientist. He later studied ballet in Boston before finally moving to New York City in 1958. It was in New York that he first volunteered for a gay rights organization, The Mattachine Society of New York. Rodwell settled in Greenwich Village in New York after someone, intending to discourage him from going to the area, told him "that's where all the queers are!" He got a job at a popular gay restaurant in Greenwich Village, but later quit and got a clerical job. Although he was active with the Mattachine Society, he eventually became disillusioned with them as he felt they were too conservative and fearful.

== Harvey Milk ==
In 1962, Rodwell had a romantic relationship with Harvey Milk, who went on later to become one of the first openly gay politicians elected to high office. It was Rodwell's first serious relationship. Rodwell's relationship with Milk ended in part due to Milk's conflicted reaction to Rodwell's early activism and his introduction to Milk of "strange new ideas that tied homosexuality to politics, ideas that both repelled and attracted the thirty-two-year-old Milk." Milk believed that Rodwell had been responsible for Milk contracting an STD. After Rodwell's arrest and incarceration when picked up cruising in Washington Square Park, Milk ended their romantic involvement. Shortly after, Rodwell attempted suicide.

When Rodwell opened the Oscar Wilde Memorial Bookshop in 1967, Milk dropped by frequently, and after moving to San Francisco Milk expressed his intention to Rodwell of opening a similar store "as a way of getting involved in community work." Milk eventually opened a camera store that also functioned as a community center, much like Rodwell's bookshop had as a community gathering place.

== Early activism ==
Also in 1967, Rodwell began the group Homophile Youth Movement in Neighborhood (HYMN) and began to publish its periodical, HYMNAL. Rodwell conceived of the first yearly gay rights protest, the Annual Reminder picketing of Independence Hall held from 1965 to 1969; Homophile Youth Movement rallies in 1967, and was present at the Stonewall Riots in 1969. He was active in the Mattachine Society until April 1966 and in several other early homophile rights organizations. At the Mattachine Society, where most members chose pseudonyms to protect themselves from law enforcement surveillance, Rodwell did not. Rodwell was a radical in the generally cautious homophile movement.

In early 1964 Rodwell, a Mattachine Society of New York volunteer and vice president, organized Mattachine Young Adults and was also an early member of Eastern Regional Conference of Homophile Organizations (ECRHO) and the North American Conference of Homophile Organizations (NACHO).

On September 19, 1964, Rodwell, along with Randy Wicker, Jefferson Poland, Renee Cafiero, and several others picketed New York's Whitehall Street Induction Center to protest the military's practice of excluding gays from serving and, when discovered serving, dishonorably discharging them.

On April 18, 1965, Rodwell led picketing at the United Nations Plaza in New York to protest Cuban detention and placement into workcamps of gays, along with Wicker, Allen Ginsberg, Peter Orlovsky and about 25 others.

In 1968, Rodwell and noted gay rights activist Frank Kameny began to promote a slogan, based on Black is Beautiful, but instead as Gay is Good. Rodwell promoted the slogan in advertising for the Oscar Wilde Memorial Bookshop, his publication Hymnal, posting the slogan in the bookshop window, and selling buttons, patches and stickers in his bookshop. The slogan, denoting pride, was an early step toward gay visibility.

== Sip-In ==
On April 21, 1966, Rodwell, along with Mattachine President Dick Leitsch and John Timmons engaged in a demonstration then called a "Sip-In" at Julius, a bar in Greenwich Village, to protest the New York State Liquor Authority rule against the congregation of gays in establishments that served alcohol. Rodwell had at an earlier date been thrown out of Julius for wearing an "Equality for Homosexuals" button. Rodwell and the others argued that the rule furthered bribery and corruption of the police. The resultant publicity led eventually to the end of the SLA rule.

== Stonewall Riots ==
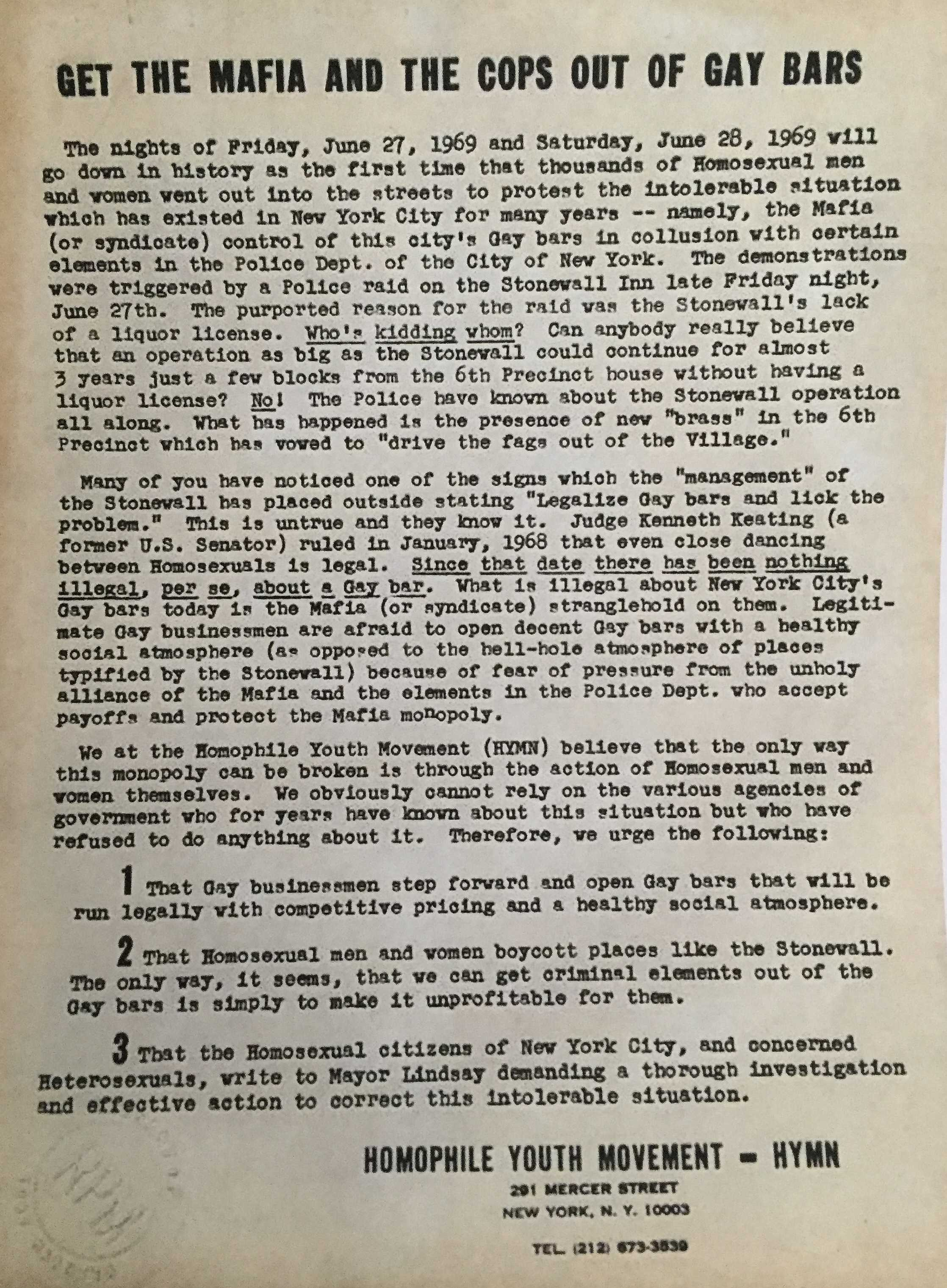
The flyer that Sargent and Rodwell distributed around NYC after the second night of the Stonewall riots.

Rodwell, already a community organizer for gay rights, was a participant in the Stonewall Riots. Early in the morning of June 28, 1969, Rodwell was on his way home with his partner, Fred Sargeant. As they passed the Stonewall Inn, they discovered a plainclothes police raid underway. As the police began to bring arrestees from the bar to a paddy wagon, Rodwell led a chant, "Gay Power!" The police retreated back into bar and the riot began. Rodwell and Sargeant called the press - The New York Times, the New York Post and the New York Daily News - to report the riot, but only The New York Times covered the story later that day. Later that morning, Rodwell and Sargeant prepared a leaflet denouncing the relationship between the police and the Stonewall's Mafia management. They continued their organizing and leafletting throughout the nights of rioting, distributing 5,000 copies of their "Get the Mafia and Cops Out of Gay Bars" flyer throughout New York City.

== First gay pride march ==
In November 1969, Rodwell proposed the first gay pride parade to be held in New York City by way of a resolution at the Eastern Regional Conference of Homophile Organizations meeting in Philadelphia, along with his partner Fred Sargeant (HYMN vice chairman), Ellen Broidy and Linda Rhodes. The first march was organized from Rodwell's apartment on Bleecker Street.

That the Annual Reminder, in order to be more relevant, reach a greater number of people, and encompass the ideas and ideals of the larger struggle in which we are engaged-that of our fundamental human rights-be moved both in time and location.

We propose that a demonstration be held annually on the last Saturday in June in New York City to commemorate the 1969 spontaneous demonstrations on Christopher Street and this demonstration be called CHRISTOPHER STREET LIBERATION DAY. No dress or age regulations shall be made for this demonstration.

We also propose that we contact Homophile organizations throughout the country and suggest that they hold parallel demonstrations on that day. We propose a nationwide show of support.

== Later activism ==
Rodwell is believed to have created the term heterosexism in January 1971 when he wrote:

After a few years of this kind of 'liberated' existence such people become oblivious and completely unseeing of straight predjudice [sic?] and - to coin a phrase - the 'hetero-sexism' surrounding them virtually 24 hours a day.

In 1978 Rodwell was one of the creators and organizers of Gay People in Christian Science (GPICS). Rodwell credits Kay Tobin with suggesting the idea for the group. One reason for the creation of the group was that 3 of its members had been recently excommunicated from the local branch church. In 1980 the group began to demonstrate by leafletting at the church's Annual Meeting in Boston and by 1999, six years after Rodwell's death, the Christian Scientist church no longer barred openly gay or lesbian people from membership.

In March 1993, Rodwell sold his bookshop. Rodwell died at Saint Vincent's Catholic Medical Center on June 18, 1993, of stomach cancer at 52.

== Honors ==
Rodwell was the recipient of the 1992 Lambda Literary Award for Publisher's Service.

In June 2019, Rodwell was one of the inaugural fifty American "pioneers, trailblazers, and heroes" inducted on the National LGBTQ Wall of Honor within the Stonewall National Monument (SNM) in New York City's Stonewall Inn. The SNM is the first U.S. national monument dedicated to LGBTQ rights and history, and the wall's unveiling was timed to take place during the 50th anniversary of the Stonewall riots.

== See also ==
- Timeline of LGBT history
- LGBT culture in New York City
- List of LGBT people from New York City
- List of gay, lesbian or bisexual people
- List of LGBT rights activists
- NYC Pride March
