= Stonewall riots =

1969 LGBTQ uprising in the US

- Part of the events leading to gay liberation and the modern LGBTQ rights movement
- The only known photograph taken during the first night of the riots, by freelance photographer Joseph Ambrosini, shows LGBTQ+ youth scuffling with police.
- Date: June 28 – July 3, 1969
- Location: Stonewall Inn, New York City, U.S. 40.7338°N 74.0021°W
- Caused by: Police raid on the Stonewall Inn (specifically); General repression of LGBTQ rights (more broadly)
- Goals: Gay liberation and LGBTQ rights in the United States
- Methods: riots; demonstrations; arsons; lootings; vandalism

Parties
Government of New York City; New York City Police Department; Tactical Patrol Force; Fourth Precinct; Fifth Precinct; Sixth Precinct; Ninth Precinct	Stonewall Inn patrons; and other sympathizers

Number
Day 1: 10 NYPD officers (inside the Inn); Day 2: Multiple NYPD precincts	Day 1: 500–600 supporters outside Day 2: ~1,000 supporters inside and outside

Casualties and losses
4 policemen injured	Unknown number of rioters injured. 13–20 arrested.

The Stonewall riots (also known as the Stonewall uprising, Stonewall rebellion, Stonewall revolution, or simply Stonewall) were a series of spontaneous riots and demonstrations against a police raid that took place in the early morning of June 28, 1969, at the Stonewall Inn, in the Greenwich Village neighborhood of New York City. Although the demonstrations were not the first time American LGBTQ people fought back against government-sponsored persecution of sexual minorities, the Stonewall riots marked a new beginning for the gay rights movement in the United States and around the world. (Note: Descriptors in this article reflect terminology that was used at the time. The one-word unifying term for people in same sex relationships or not conforming to gender norms in the 1950s through the early 1980s was "homosexual" or "gay" (see Gay liberation). Later ('70s/80s) this was expanded by many groups to lesbian and gay, then by the '90s and '00s to lesbian, gay, bisexual, transgender (LGBT).)

American gays and lesbians in the 1950s and 1960s faced a legal system more anti-homosexual than those of some other Western and Eastern countries. (Note: Except for Illinois, which decriminalized sodomy in 1961, homosexual acts, even between consenting adults acting in private homes, were a criminal offense in every U.S. state at the time the Stonewall riots occurred: "An adult convicted of the crime of having sex with another consenting adult in the privacy of his or her home could get anywhere from a light fine to five, ten, or twenty years—or even life—in prison. In 1971, twenty states had 'sex psychopath' laws that permitted the detaining of homosexuals for that reason alone. In Pennsylvania and California sex offenders could be committed to a psychiatric institution for life, and [in] seven states they could be castrated." (Carter, p. 15) Castration, emetics, hypnosis, electroshock therapy and lobotomies were used by psychiatrists to attempt to cure homosexuals through the 1950s and 1960s.(Katz, pp. 181–197.)(Adam, p. 60.)) Early homophile groups in the U.S. sought to prove that gay people could be assimilated into society, and they favored non-confrontational education for homosexuals and heterosexuals alike. The last years of the 1960s, however, were very contentious, as many social movements were active, including the civil rights movement, the counterculture of the 1960s, and antiwar demonstrations. These influences, along with the liberal environment of Greenwich Village, served as catalysts for the Stonewall riots.

Very few establishments welcomed openly gay people in the 1950s and 1960s. Those that did were often bars, although bar owners and managers were rarely gay. The Stonewall Inn was owned by the Mafia and catered to an assortment of patrons. It was popular among the poorest and most marginalized people in the gay community: drag queens, representatives of the transgender community, effeminate young men, hustlers, and homeless youth. Police raids on gay bars were routine in the 1960s, but, in contrast to what was typical for raids at the time, the Mafia was not alerted by police prior to their arrival, nor was the NYPD's sixth precinct. Beyond this, raids typically occurred on weeknights in the early evening, when bar crowds were expected to be small. The Stonewall raid, in contrast, was to take place late on a Friday night, when crowd sizes were expected to be at their highest. Officers quickly lost control of the situation at the Stonewall Inn and attracted a crowd that was incited to riot. Tensions between New York City police and gay residents of Greenwich Village erupted into more protests the next evening and again several nights later. Within weeks, Village residents quickly organized into activist groups to concentrate efforts on establishing places for gay people to be open about their sexual orientation without fear of being arrested.

Following the Stonewall riots, sexual and gender minorities in New York City still faced gender, class, and generational obstacles to becoming a cohesive community. Over the following weeks and months, they initiated politically active social organizations and launched publications that spoke openly about rights for gay and trans people. The first anniversary of the riots was marked by peaceful demonstrations in several American cities that have since grown to become pride parades. The Stonewall National Monument was established at the site in 2016. Today, pride events are held annually throughout the world toward the end of June to mark the Stonewall riots.

== Background ==
=== Homosexuality in 20th-century United States ===
Following the social upheaval of World War II, many people in the United States felt a fervent desire to "restore the prewar social order and hold off the forces of change", according to historian Barry Adam. Spurred by the national emphasis on anti-communism, Senator Joseph McCarthy conducted hearings searching for communists in the U.S. government, the U.S. Army, and other government-funded agencies and institutions, leading to a national paranoia. Anarchists, communists, and other people deemed un-American and subversive were considered security risks. Gay men and lesbians were included in this list by the U.S. State Department on the theory that they were susceptible to blackmail. In 1950, a Senate investigation chaired by Clyde R. Hoey noted in a report, "It is generally believed that those who engage in overt acts of perversion lack the emotional stability of normal persons", and said all of the government's intelligence agencies "are in complete agreement that sex perverts in Government constitute security risks". Between 1947 and 1950, 1,700 federal job applications were denied, 4,380 people were discharged from the military, and 420 were fired from their government jobs for being suspected homosexuals.

Throughout the 1950s and 1960s, the Federal Bureau of Investigation (FBI) and police departments kept lists of known homosexuals and their favored establishments and friends; the U.S. Post Office kept track of addresses where material pertaining to homosexuality was mailed. State and local governments followed suit: bars catering to gay men and lesbians were shut down and their customers were arrested and exposed in newspapers. Cities performed "sweeps" to rid neighborhoods, parks, bars, and beaches of gay people. They outlawed the wearing of opposite-gender clothes and universities expelled instructors suspected of being homosexual.

In 1952, the American Psychiatric Association listed homosexuality in the Diagnostic and Statistical Manual (DSM) as a mental disorder. A large-scale study of homosexuality in 1962 was used to justify the inclusion of the "disorder" as a supposed pathological hidden fear of the opposite sex caused by traumatic parent–child relationships. This view was widely influential in the medical profession. In 1956, the psychologist Evelyn Hooker performed a study that compared the happiness and well-adjusted nature of self-identified homosexual men with heterosexual men and found no difference. Her study stunned the medical community and made her a hero to many gay men and lesbians, but homosexuality remained in the DSM until 1974.

=== Homophile activism ===
In response to this trend, two organizations formed independently of each other. Los Angeles area homosexuals created the Mattachine Society in 1950, in the home of communist activist Harry Hay. Their objectives were to unify homosexuals, educate them, provide leadership, and assist "sexual deviants" with legal troubles. Facing enormous opposition to their radical approach, in 1953 the Mattachine shifted their focus to assimilation and respectability. They reasoned that they would change more minds about homosexuality by proving that gay men and lesbians were normal people, no different from heterosexuals. Soon after, several women in San Francisco met in their living rooms to form the Daughters of Bilitis (DOB) for lesbians. Although the eight women who created the DOB initially came together to be able to have a safe place to dance, as the DOB grew they developed similar goals to the Mattachine and urged their members to assimilate into general society.

One of the first challenges to government repression came in 1953. An organization named ONE, Inc. published a magazine called ONE. The U.S. Postal Service refused to mail its August issue, which concerned homosexual people in heterosexual marriages, on the grounds that the material was obscene despite it being covered in brown paper wrapping. The case eventually went to the Supreme Court, which in 1958 ruled that ONE, Inc. could mail its materials through the Postal Service.

Homophile organizations—as homosexual groups self-identified in this era—grew in number and spread to the East Coast. Gradually, members of these organizations grew bolder. Frank Kameny founded the Mattachine of Washington, D.C. He had been fired from the U.S. Army Map Service for being a homosexual and sued unsuccessfully to be reinstated. Kameny wrote that homosexuals were no different from heterosexuals, often aiming his efforts at mental health professionals, some of whom attended Mattachine and DOB meetings telling members they were abnormal.

In 1965, news on Cuban prison work camps for homosexuals inspired Mattachine New York and D.C. to organize protests at the United Nations and the White House. Similar demonstrations were held at other government buildings. The purpose was to protest poor treatment of gay people in Cuba and employment discrimination in the U.S. These pickets shocked many gay people and upset some of the leadership of Mattachine and the DOB. At the same time, demonstrations in the civil rights movement and opposition to the Vietnam War all grew in prominence, frequency, and severity as did their confrontations with police forces.

=== Earlier resistance and riots ===
On the outer fringes of a few small gay communities were people who challenged traditional gender norms—effeminate men, masculine women, or people who dressed and lived in ways that contrasted with their sex assigned at birth, either part-time or full-time. At the time, nomenclature classified them as transvestites. Thus, as the most visible representatives for sexual minorities, they belied the carefully crafted image promoted by the Mattachine Society and DOB, which sought to portray homosexuals as capable of fitting within a normative society. The Mattachine and DOB believed that being arrested for wearing clothing normative of the opposite gender was akin to the struggles of homophile organizations—similar but distinctly separate.

Gay, lesbian, bisexual, and transgender people rioted at the Cooper Do-nuts café in Los Angeles in 1959 to counteract police harassment. In a larger 1966 event in San Francisco, drag queens, hustlers, and trans women were sitting in Compton's Cafeteria when the police arrived to arrest people who appeared to have been assigned male at birth but presented femininely. A riot ensued: cafeteria patrons were slinging cups, plates, and saucers, breaking the plexiglass windows in the front of the restaurant. They returned several days later to break the windows again shortly after they were replaced. Professor Susan Stryker classifies the Compton's Cafeteria riot as an "act of anti-transgender discrimination, rather than an act of discrimination against sexual orientation" and connects the uprising to the intersectionality of gender, race, and class in relation to sexual orientation, which were being downplayed by contemporary homophile organizations. It marked the beginning of transgender activism in San Francisco.

=== Greenwich Village ===
Washington Square Park in Greenwich Village

The Manhattan neighborhoods of Greenwich Village and Harlem were home to sizable gay and lesbian populations after World War I, when people who had served in the military took advantage of the opportunity to settle in larger cities. The enclaves of gay men and lesbians, described by a newspaper story as "short-haired women and long-haired men", developed a distinct subculture through the following two decades. Prohibition inadvertently benefited gay establishments, as drinking alcohol was pushed underground along with other behaviors considered immoral. New York City passed laws against homosexuality in public and private businesses, but because alcohol was in high demand, speakeasies and impromptu drinking establishments were so numerous and temporary that authorities were unable to police them all. However, police raids continued, resulting in the closure of iconic establishments such as Eve's Hangout in 1926.

The social repression of the 1950s resulted in a cultural revolution in Greenwich Village. A cohort of poets, later named the Beat poets, wrote about the evils of the social organization at the time, glorifying anarchy, drugs, and hedonistic pleasures over unquestioning social compliance, consumerism, and closed-mindedness. Of them, Allen Ginsberg and William S. Burroughs—both Greenwich Village residents—also wrote bluntly and honestly about homosexuality. Their writings attracted sympathetic liberal-minded people, as well as homosexuals looking for a community.

By the early 1960s, a campaign to rid New York City of gay bars was in full effect by order of Mayor Robert F. Wagner Jr., who was concerned about the image of the city in preparation for the 1964 World's Fair. The city revoked the liquor licenses of the bars and undercover police officers worked to entrap as many homosexual men as possible. Entrapment usually consisted of an undercover officer who found a man in a bar or public park, engaged him in conversation; if the conversation headed toward the possibility that they might leave together—or the officer bought the man a drink—he was arrested for solicitation. One story in the New York Post described an arrest in a gym locker room, where the officer grabbed his crotch, moaning, and a man who asked him if he was all right was arrested. Few lawyers would defend cases as undesirable as these and some of those lawyers kicked back their fees to the arresting officer.

The Mattachine Society succeeded in getting newly elected mayor John Lindsay to end the campaign of police entrapment in New York City. They had a more difficult time with the New York State Liquor Authority (SLA). While no laws prohibited serving homosexuals, courts allowed the SLA discretion in approving and revoking liquor licenses for businesses that might become "disorderly". Despite the high population of gay men and lesbians who called Greenwich Village home, very few places existed, other than bars, where they were able to congregate openly without being harassed or arrested. In 1966 the New York Mattachine held a "sip-in" at a Greenwich Village bar named Julius, which was frequented by gay men, to illustrate the discrimination homosexuals faced.

Lindsay's re-election campaign for mayor in the summer of 1969 resulted in an acceleration of police enforcement action against gay bars and their patrons, stemming primarily from a belief that such enforcement would be praised by an increasingly anxious general public amidst the myriad social movements of the era. Closeted gay men were seen as an easy target for political scapegoating as a result of their marginalized position in American society, combined with the perceived unlikelihood that they or anyone else would actively resist police violence against them.

A week before the Stonewall riots, the Checkerboard, another popular gay bar in the area, was raided by police. None of the bars frequented by gay men and lesbians were owned by gay people. Almost all of them were owned and controlled by organized crime, who treated the regulars poorly, watered down the liquor, and overcharged for drinks. However, they also paid off police to prevent frequent raids.

=== Stonewall Inn ===
Location of the Stonewall Inn in relation to Greenwich Village
1 Stonewall Inn
2 Christopher Park
3 Sheridan Square

The Stonewall Inn, located at 51 and 53 Christopher Street, along with several other establishments in the city, was owned by the Genovese crime family. In 1966, three members of the Mafia invested $3,500 to turn the Stonewall Inn into a gay bar, after it had been a restaurant and a nightclub for heterosexuals. Once a week a police officer would collect envelopes of cash as a payoff known as a gayola, as the Stonewall Inn had no liquor license. It had no running water behind the bar—dirty glasses were run through tubs of water and immediately reused. There were no fire exits, and the toilets overran consistently. Though the bar was not used for prostitution, drug sales and other black market activities took place. It was the only bar for gay men in New York City where dancing was allowed; dancing was its main draw since its re-opening as a gay club.

Visitors to the Stonewall Inn in 1969 were greeted by a bouncer who inspected them through a peephole in the door. The legal drinking age was 18 and to avoid unwittingly letting in undercover police (who were called "Lily Law", "Alice Blue Gown", or "Betty Badge"), visitors would have to be known by the doorman or 'look gay'. Patrons were required to sign their names in a book to prove that the bar was a private "bottle club", but they rarely signed their real names. There were two dance floors in the Stonewall. The interior was painted black, making it very dark inside, with pulsing gel lights or black lights. If police were spotted, regular white lights were turned on, signaling that everyone should stop dancing or touching. In the rear of the bar was a smaller room frequented by "queens"; it was one of two bars where effeminate men who wore makeup and teased their hair (though dressed in men's clothing) could go. Only a few people in full drag were allowed in by the bouncers. The customers were "98 percent male" but a few lesbians sometimes came to the bar. Younger homeless adolescent males, who slept in nearby Christopher Park, would often try to get in so customers would buy them drinks. The age of the clientele ranged from the upper teens to the early thirties and the racial mix consisted of mostly white patrons, with some who were Black or Hispanic. Because of its mix of people, its location, and the attraction of dancing, the Stonewall Inn was known by many as "the gay bar in the city".

Police raids on gay bars were frequent, occurring on average once a month for each bar. Many bars kept extra liquor in a secret panel behind the bar, or in a car down the block, to facilitate resuming business as quickly as possible if alcohol was seized. Bar management usually knew about raids beforehand due to police tip-offs, and raids occurred early enough in the evening that business could commence after the police had finished. During a typical raid, the lights were turned on and customers were lined up and their identification cards checked. Those without identification or dressed in full drag were arrested; others were allowed to leave. Some of the men, including those in drag, used their draft cards as identification. Women were required to wear three pieces of feminine clothing and would be arrested if found not wearing them. Typically, employees and management of the bars were also arrested. The period immediately before June 28, 1969, was marked by frequent raids of local bars—including a raid at the Stonewall Inn on the Tuesday before the riots—and the closing of the Checkerboard, the Tele-Star, and two other clubs in Greenwich Village.

== Riots ==
=== Police raid ===
Layout of the Stonewall Inn, 1969

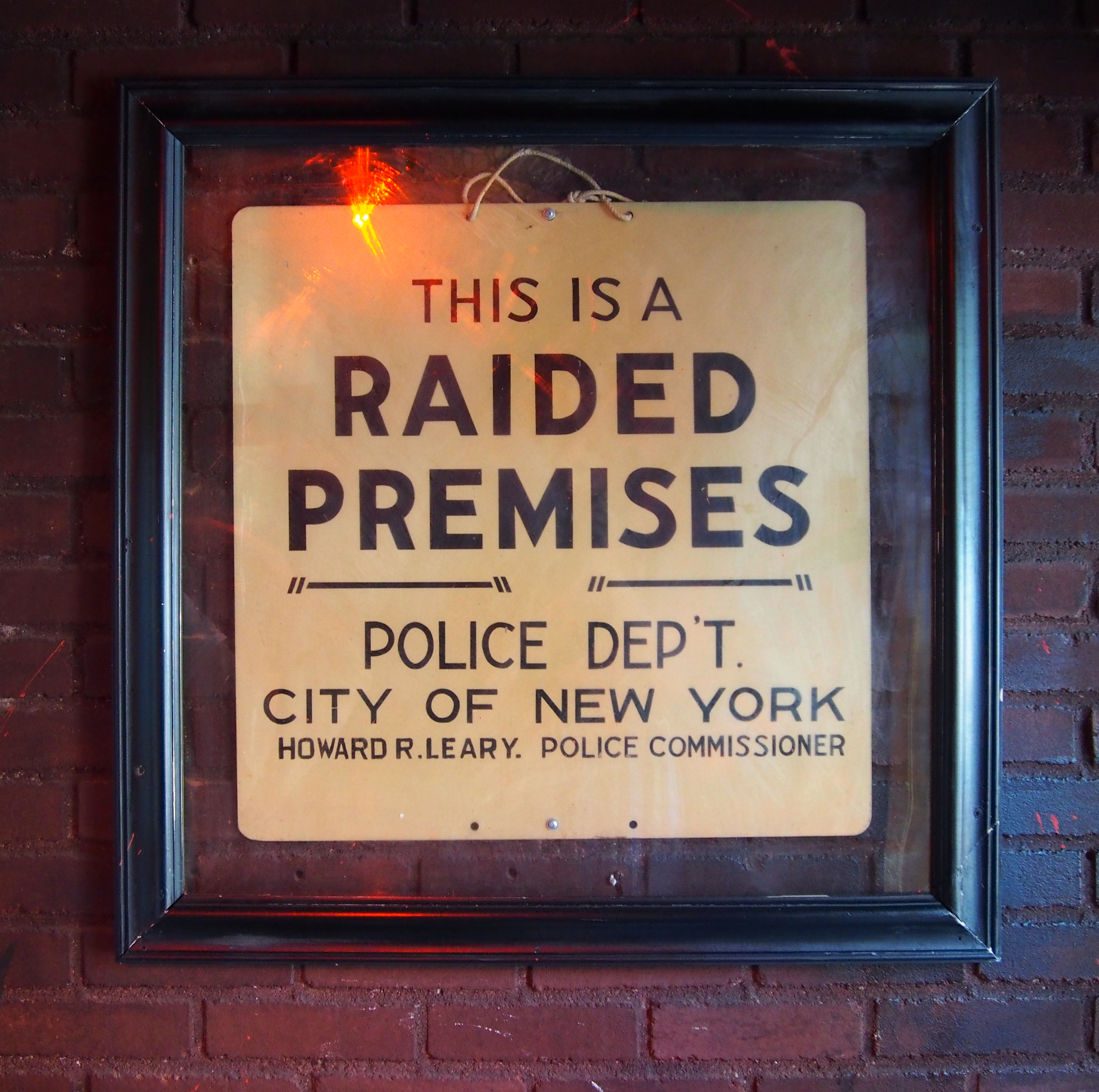
The sign left by police following the raid is now on display just inside the entrance.

At 1:20 a.m. on Saturday, June 28, 1969, four plainclothes policemen in dark suits, two patrol officers in uniform, Detective Charles Smythe, and Deputy Inspector Seymour Pine arrived at the Stonewall Inn's double doors and announced "Police! We're taking the place!" Two undercover policewomen and two undercover policemen entered the bar early that evening to gather visual evidence, as the Public Morals Squad waited outside for the signal. Once ready, the undercover officers called for backup from the Sixth Precinct using the bar's pay telephone. Stonewall employees do not recall being tipped off that a raid was to occur that night, as was the custom. (Note: According to Duberman (p. 194), there was a rumor that one might happen, but since it was much later than raids generally took place, Stonewall management thought the tip was inaccurate. Days after the raid, one of the bar owners complained that the tipoff had never come, and that the raid was ordered by the Bureau of Alcohol, Tobacco, and Firearms, who objected that there were no stamps on the liquor bottles, indicating the alcohol was bootlegged. David Carter presents information (p. 96–103) indicating that the Mafia owners of the Stonewall and the manager were blackmailing wealthier customers, particularly those who worked on Wall Street. They appeared to be making more money from extortion than they were from liquor sales in the bar. Carter deduces that when the police were unable to receive kickbacks from blackmail and the theft of negotiable bonds (facilitated by pressuring gay Wall Street customers), they decided to close the Stonewall Inn permanently.) The music was turned off and the main lights were turned on. Approximately 200 people were in the bar that night. Patrons who had never experienced a police raid were confused. A few who realized what was happening began to run for doors and windows in the bathrooms, but police barred the doors. Michael Fader remembered, "Things happened so fast you kind of got caught not knowing. All of a sudden there were police there and we were told to all get in lines and to have our identification ready to be led out of the bar."

The raid did not go as planned. Standard procedure was to line up the patrons, check their identification and have female police officers take patrons they perceived to be women to the bathroom to verify their sex. The officers would then arrest any trans women or drag queens. The women refused to go with the officers and the men in line refused to produce their identification. The police decided to take everyone present to the police station, after separating those suspected of cross-dressing in a room in the back of the bar. All parties involved recall that a sense of discomfort spread very quickly, beginning with police who assaulted some of the lesbians by "feeling some of them up inappropriately" while frisking them.

When did you ever see a fag fight back? ... Now, times were a-changin'. Tuesday night was the last night for bullshit ... Predominantly, the theme [w]as, "this shit has got to stop!"

— Ronnie Di Brienza

The police were to transport the bar's alcohol in patrol wagons. Twenty-eight cases of beer and nineteen bottles of hard liquor were seized, but the patrol wagons had not yet arrived, so patrons were required to wait in line for about 15 minutes. Those who were not arrested were released from the front door, but they did not leave quickly as usual. Instead, they stopped outside and a crowd began to grow and watch. Within minutes, between 100 and 150 people had congregated outside, some after they were released from inside the Stonewall and some after noticing the police cars and the crowd. Although the police forcefully pushed or kicked some patrons out of the bar, some customers released by the police performed for the crowd by posing and saluting the police in an exaggerated fashion. The crowd's applause encouraged them further.

When the first patrol wagon arrived, Inspector Pine recalled that the crowd—most of whom were assumed to be homosexual—had grown to at least ten times the number of people who were arrested and they all became very quiet. Confusion over radio communication delayed the arrival of a second wagon. The police began escorting Mafia members into the first wagon, to the cheers of the bystanders. Next, regular employees were loaded into the wagon. A bystander shouted, "Gay power!", someone began singing "We Shall Overcome" and the crowd reacted with amusement and general good humor mixed with "growing and intensive hostility". An officer shoved a person in drag, who responded by hitting him on the head with her purse. The cop clubbed her over the head, as the crowd began to boo. Author Edmund White, who had been passing by, recalled, "Everyone's restless, angry, and high-spirited. No one has a slogan, no one even has an attitude, but something's brewing." Pennies, then beer bottles, were thrown at the wagon as a rumor spread through the crowd that patrons still inside the bar were being beaten.

A scuffle broke out when a woman in handcuffs was escorted from the door of the bar to the waiting police wagon several times. She escaped repeatedly and fought with four of the police, swearing and shouting, for about ten minutes. Described as "a typical New York butch" and "a dyke–stone butch", she had been hit on the head by an officer with a baton for, as one witness claimed, complaining that her handcuffs were too tight. Bystanders recalled that the woman, whose identity remains unknown (Stormé DeLarverie has been identified by some, including herself, as the woman, but accounts vary (Note: Accounts of people who witnessed the scene, including letters and news reports of the woman who fought with police, conflicted. Where witnesses claim one woman who fought her treatment at the hands of the police caused the crowd to become angry, some also remembered several "butch lesbians" had begun to fight back while still in the bar. At least one was already bleeding when taken out of the bar. Craig Rodwell claims the arrest of the woman was not the primary event that triggered the violence, but one of several simultaneous occurrences: "there was just ... a flash of group—of mass—anger.")), sparked the crowd to fight when she looked at bystanders and shouted, "Why don't you guys do something?" After an officer picked her up and heaved her into the back of the wagon, the crowd became violent.

=== Violence breaks out ===
The police tried to restrain some of the crowd, knocking a few people down, which incited bystanders even more. Some of those handcuffed in the wagon escaped when police left them unattended (deliberately, according to some witnesses). (Note: Witness Morty Manford stated, "There's no doubt in my mind that those people were deliberately left unguarded. I assume there was some sort of relationship between the bar management and the local police, so they really didn't want to arrest those people. But they had to at least look like they were doing their jobs.") As the crowd tried to overturn the police wagon, two police cars and the wagon—with a few slashed tires—left immediately, with Inspector Pine urging them to return as soon as possible. The commotion attracted more people who learned what was happening. Someone in the crowd declared that the bar had been raided because "they didn't pay off the cops", to which someone else yelled, "Let's pay them off!" Coins sailed through the air towards the police as the crowd shouted "Pigs!" and "Faggot cops!" Beer cans were thrown and the police lashed out, dispersing some of the crowd who found a construction site nearby with stacks of bricks. The police, outnumbered by between 500 and 600 people, grabbed several people, including activist folk singer Dave Van Ronk—who had been attracted to the revolt from a bar two doors away. Though Van Ronk was not gay, he had experienced police violence when he participated in antiwar demonstrations: "As far as I was concerned, anybody who'd stand against the cops was all right with me and that's why I stayed in ... Every time you turned around the cops were pulling some outrage or another." Van Ronk was the first of thirteen arrested that night. Ten police officers—including two policewomen—barricaded themselves, Van Ronk, Howard Smith (a column writer for The Village Voice), and several handcuffed detainees inside the Stonewall Inn for their own safety.

Multiple accounts of the riot assert that there was no pre-existing organization or apparent cause for the demonstration; what ensued was spontaneous. (Note: In the years since the riots occurred, the death of gay icon Judy Garland earlier in the week on June 22, 1969 has been attributed as a significant factor in the riots, but no participants in Saturday morning's demonstrations recall Garland's name being discussed. No print accounts of the riots by reliable sources cite Garland as a reason for the riot. Only one contemporary account suggested it, an account by a heterosexual person ridiculing the riots. Bob Kohler used to talk to the homeless youth in Sheridan Square and said, "When people talk about Judy Garland's death having anything much to do with the riot, that makes me crazy. The street kids faced death every day. They had nothing to lose. And they couldn't have cared less about Judy. We're talking about kids who were fourteen, fifteen, sixteen. Judy Garland was the middle-aged darling of the middle-class gays. I get upset about this because it trivializes the whole thing.") Michael Fader explained:

We all had a collective feeling like we'd had enough of this kind of shit. It wasn't anything tangible anybody said to anyone else, it was just kind of like everything over the years had come to a head on that one particular night in the one particular place and it was not an organized demonstration...

The only known photograph from the first night of the riots, taken by freelance photographer Joseph Ambrosini, shows the homeless gay youth who slept in nearby Christopher Park, scuffling with police. Jackie Hormona and Tommy Lanigan-Schmidt are on the far left.

The Mattachine Society newsletter a month later offered its explanation of why the riots occurred: "[The Stonewall] catered largely to a group of people who are not welcome in, or cannot afford, other places of homosexual social gathering ... The Stonewall became home to these kids. When it was raided, they fought for it. That and the fact that they had nothing to lose other than the most tolerant and broadminded gay place in town, explains why."

Garbage cans, garbage, bottles, rocks, and bricks were hurled at the building, breaking the windows. Witnesses attest that "flame queens", hustlers, and gay "street kids"—the most outcast people in the gay community—were responsible for the first volley of projectiles, as well as the uprooting of a parking meter used as a battering ram on the doors of the Stonewall Inn.

The mob lit garbage on fire and stuffed it through the broken windows as the police grabbed a fire hose. Because it had no water pressure, the hose was ineffective in dispersing the crowd and seemed only to encourage them. Marsha P. Johnson later said that it was the police that had started the fire in the bar. (Note: Sylvia Rivera reported being handed a Molotov cocktail and throwing it (there were no eyewitness accounts of Molotov cocktails the first night although many fires were set). In 2019, David Carter admitted that this account of Rivera's actions was fabricated and that multiple witnesses over the years, including Marsha P. Johnson, had all agreed that Rivera had not been present at the uprising. Bob Kohler told Carter that although Rivera had not been at the uprising, he hoped that Carter would still portray her as having been there. Another Stonewall veteran, Thomas Lanigan-Schmidt, claimed that he wanted Carter to include Rivera "so that young Puerto Rican transgender people on the street would have a role model." When Kohler and Rivera had a discussion over whether Kohler would back Rivera's claims to Carter for the book, Rivera asked Kohler to say that Rivera threw a Molotov cocktail. Kohler responded, "Sylvia, you didn't throw a Molotov cocktail!" Rivera continued to bargain with him, asking if he'd say she threw the first brick. He replied, "Sylvia, you didn't throw a brick." The first bottle? He still refused. Finally, Kohler agreed to lie and say Rivera had been there and had at some point thrown a bottle.) When demonstrators broke through the windows—which had been covered by plywood by the bar owners to deter the police from raiding the bar—the police inside unholstered their pistols. The doors flew open and officers pointed their weapons at the angry crowd, threatening to shoot. Howard Smith, in the bar with the police, took a wrench from the bar and stuffed it in his pants, unsure if he might have to use it against the mob or the police. He watched someone squirt lighter fluid into the bar; as it was lit and the police took aim, sirens were heard and fire trucks arrived. The onslaught had lasted 45 minutes.

When the violence broke out, the women and transmasculine people being held down the street at The Women's House of Detention joined in by chanting, as well as setting fire to their belongings and tossing them into the street below. The historian Hugh Ryan says, "When I would talk to people about Stonewall, they would tell me, that night on Stonewall, we looked to the prison because we saw the women rioting and chanting, 'Gay rights, gay rights, gay rights.'"

=== Escalation ===
The Tactical Patrol Force (TPF) of the New York City Police Department arrived to free the police trapped inside the Stonewall. One officer's eye was cut and a few others were bruised from being struck by flying debris. Bob Kohler, who was walking his dog by the Stonewall that night, saw the TPF arrive:

I had been in enough riots to know the fun was over ... The cops were totally humiliated. This never, ever happened. They were angrier than I guess they had ever been because everybody else had rioted ... but the fairies were not supposed to riot ... no group had ever forced cops to retreat before, so the anger was just enormous. I mean, they wanted to kill.

With larger numbers, police detained anyone they could and put them in patrol wagons to go to jail, though Inspector Pine recalled, "Fights erupted with the transvestites, who wouldn't go into the patrol wagon." His recollection was corroborated by another witness across the street who said, "All I could see about who was fighting was that it was transvestites and they were fighting furiously."

The TPF formed a phalanx and attempted to clear the streets by marching slowly and pushing the crowd back. The mob openly mocked the police. The crowd cheered, started impromptu kick lines and sang to the tune of "Ta-ra-ra Boom-de-ay": "We are the Stonewall girls/ We wear our hair in curls/ We don't wear underwear/ We show our pubic hair." (Note: Some references have the last line as "... pubic hairs" instead.) Lucian Truscott reported in The Village Voice: "A stagnant situation there brought on some gay tomfoolery in the form of a chorus line facing the line of helmeted and club-carrying cops. Just as the line got into a full kick routine, the TPF advanced again and cleared the crowd of screaming gay power[-]ites down Christopher to Seventh Avenue." One participant who had been in the Stonewall during the raid recalled, "The police rushed us and that's when I realized this is not a good thing to do, because they got me in the back with a nightstick." Another account stated, "I just can't ever get that one sight out of my mind. The cops with the [nightsticks] and the kick line on the other side. It was the most amazing thing ... And all the sudden that kick line, which I guess was a spoof on the machismo ... I think that's when I felt rage. Because people were getting smashed with bats. And for what? A kick line."

Marsha P. Johnson, an African-American street queen, recalled arriving at the bar around "2:00 [am]", and that at that point the riots were well underway, with the building in flames. As the riots continued into the early morning, Johnson, along with Zazu Nova and Jackie Hormona, were noted as "three individuals known to have been in the vanguard" of the pushback against the police.

Craig Rodwell, owner of the Oscar Wilde Memorial Bookshop, reported watching police chase participants through the crooked streets, only to see them appear around the next corner behind the police. Members of the mob stopped cars, overturning one of them to block Christopher Street. Jack Nichols and Lige Clarke, in their column printed in Screw, declared that "massive crowds of angry protesters chased [the police] for blocks screaming, 'Catch them!'"

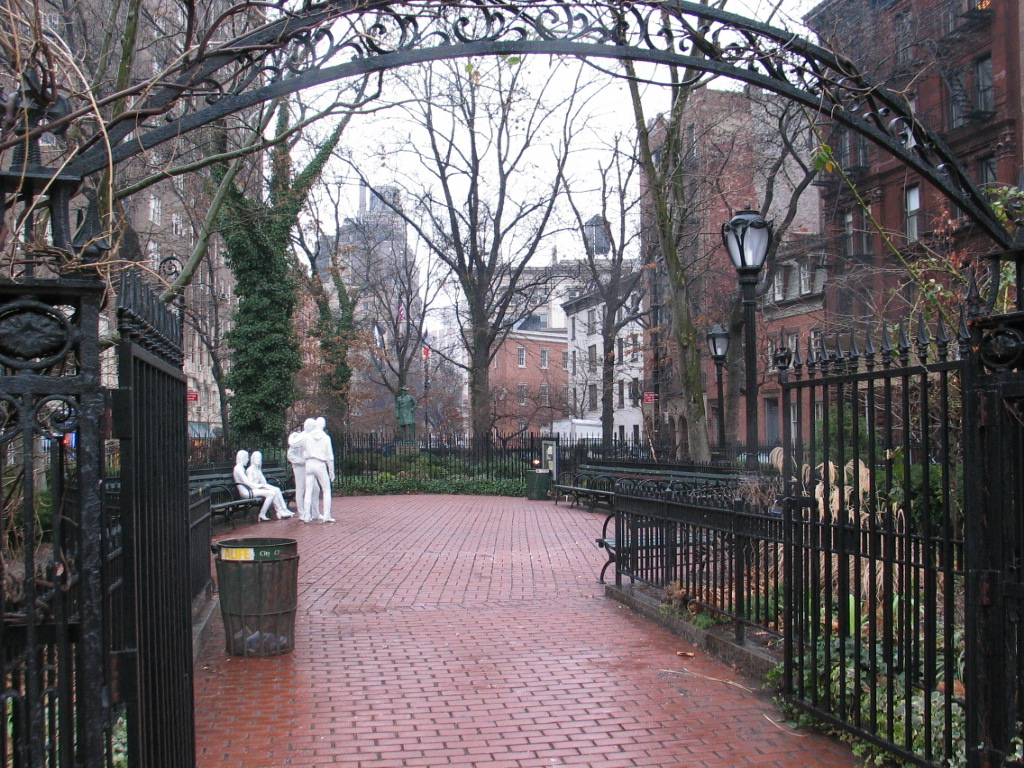
Christopher Park, where many of the demonstrators met after the first night of rioting to talk about what had happened. It is now the site of the Gay Liberation Monument, featuring a sculpture of four figures by George Segal.

By 4:00 am, the streets had nearly been cleared. Many people sat on stoops or gathered nearby in Christopher Park throughout the morning, dazed in disbelief at what had transpired. Many witnesses remembered the surreal and eerie quiet that descended upon Christopher Street, though there continued to be "electricity in the air". One commented: "There was a certain beauty in the aftermath of the riot ... It was obvious, at least to me, that a lot of people really were gay and, you know, this was our street." Thirteen people had been arrested. Some in the crowd were hospitalized, (Note: One protester needed stitches to repair a knee broken by a nightstick; another lost two fingers in a car door. Witnesses recollect that some of the most "feminine boys" were beaten badly.) and four police officers were injured. Almost everything in the Stonewall Inn was broken. Inspector Pine had intended to close and dismantle the Stonewall Inn that night. Pay phones, toilets, mirrors, jukeboxes, and cigarette machines were all smashed, possibly in the riot and possibly by the police.

=== Second night of rioting ===
During the siege of the Stonewall, Craig Rodwell called The New York Times, the New York Post, and the Daily News to tell them what was happening. All three papers covered the riots; the Daily News placed coverage on the front page. News of the riot spread quickly throughout Greenwich Village, fueled by rumors that it had been organized by the Students for a Democratic Society, the Black Panthers, or triggered by "a homosexual police officer whose roommate went dancing at the Stonewall against the officer's wishes". All day Saturday, June 28, people came to stare at the burned and blackened Stonewall Inn. Graffiti appeared on the walls of the bar, declaring "Drag power", "They invaded our rights", "Support gay power" and "Legalize gay bars", along with accusations of police looting and—regarding the status of the bar—"We are open."

The next night, rioting again surrounded Christopher Street; participants remember differently which night was more frantic or violent. Many of the same people returned from the previous evening—hustlers, street youths, and "queens"—but they were joined by "police provocateurs", curious bystanders, and even tourists. Remarkable to many was the sudden exhibition of homosexual affection in public, as described by one witness: "From going to places where you had to knock on a door and speak to someone through a peephole in order to get in. We were just out. We were in the streets."

Thousands of people had gathered in front of the Stonewall, which had opened again, choking Christopher Street until the crowd spilled into adjoining blocks. The throng surrounded buses and cars, harassing the occupants unless they either admitted they were gay or indicated their support for the demonstrators. Marsha P. Johnson was seen climbing a lamppost and dropping a heavy bag onto the hood of a police car, shattering the windshield.

As on the previous evening, fires were started in garbage cans throughout the neighborhood. More than a hundred police were present from the Fourth, Fifth, Sixth and Ninth Precincts, but after 2:00 a.m. the TPF arrived again. Kick lines and police chases waxed and waned; when police captured demonstrators, whom the majority of witnesses described as "sissies" or "swishes", the crowd surged to take them back from the police. Again, street battling ensued until 4:00 am.

Beat poet and longtime Greenwich Village resident Allen Ginsberg lived on Christopher Street and happened upon the jubilant chaos. After he learned of the riot that had occurred the previous evening, he stated, "Gay power! Isn't that great! ... It's about time we did something to assert ourselves" and visited the open Stonewall Inn for the first time. While walking home, he declared to Lucian Truscott, "You know, the guys there were so beautiful—they've lost that wounded look that fags all had 10 years ago."

Activist Mark Segal recounts that Martha Shelley and Marty Robinson stood and made speeches from the front door of the Stonewall on June 29, 1969, the second night of the riot.

=== Leaflets, press coverage, and more violence ===
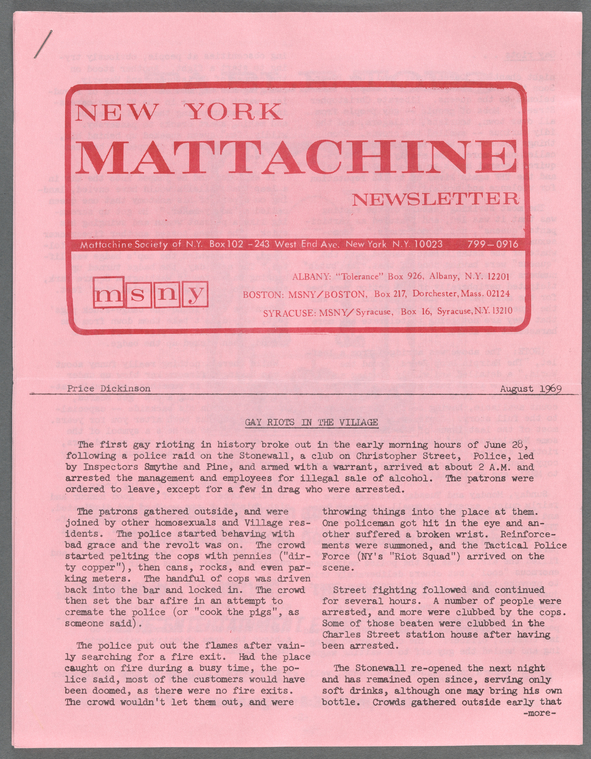
August 1969 Mattachine Society newsletter, covering the events

Activity in Greenwich Village was sporadic on Monday, June 30, and Tuesday, July 1, partly due to rain. Police and Village residents had a few altercations, as both groups antagonized each other. Craig Rodwell and his partner Fred Sargeant took the opportunity the morning after the first riot to print and distribute 5,000 leaflets, one of them reading: "Get the Mafia and the Cops out of Gay Bars." The leaflets called for gay people to own their own establishments, for a boycott of the Stonewall and other Mafia-owned bars, and for public pressure on the mayor's office to investigate the "intolerable situation".

Not everyone in the gay community considered the revolt a positive development. To many older homosexuals and many members of the Mattachine Society who had worked throughout the 1960s to promote homosexuals as no different from heterosexuals, the display of violence and effeminate behavior was embarrassing. Randy Wicker, who had marched in the first gay picket lines before the White House in 1965, said the "screaming queens forming chorus lines and kicking went against everything that I wanted people to think about homosexuals ... that we were a bunch of drag queens in the Village acting disorderly and tacky and cheap." Others found the closing of the Stonewall Inn, termed a "sleaze joint", as advantageous to the Village.

On Wednesday, however, The Village Voice ran reports of the riots, written by Howard Smith and Lucian Truscott, that included unflattering descriptions of the events and its participants: "forces of faggotry", "limp wrists" and "Sunday fag follies". (Note: Carter (p. 201) attributes the anger at The Village Voice reports to its focus on the effeminate behavior of the participants, with the exclusion of any kind of bravery. Author Edmund White insists that Smith and Truscott were trying to assert their own heterosexuality by referring to the events and people in derogatory terms.) A mob descended upon Christopher Street once again and threatened to burn down the offices of The Village Voice, which at the time was headquartered several buildings west of the Stonewall Inn on Christopher Street; that proximity gave Truscott and other writers for the newspaper first hand observations of the uprising. Also in the mob of between 500 and 1,000 were other groups that had had unsuccessful confrontations with the police and were curious how the police were defeated in this situation. Another explosive street battle took place, with injuries to demonstrators and police alike, local shops getting looted, and arrests of five people. The incidents on Wednesday night lasted about an hour and were summarized by one witness: "The word is out. Christopher Street shall be liberated. The fags have had it with oppression."

== Aftermath ==
The feeling of urgency spread throughout Greenwich Village, even to people who had not witnessed the riots. Many who were moved by the rebellion attended organizational meetings, sensing an opportunity to take action. On July 4, 1969, the Mattachine Society performed its annual picket in front of Independence Hall in Philadelphia, called the Annual Reminder. Organizers Craig Rodwell, Frank Kameny, Randy Wicker, Barbara Gittings, and Kay Lahusen, who had all participated for several years, took a bus along with other picketers from New York City to Philadelphia. Since 1965, the pickets had been very controlled: women wore skirts and men wore suits and ties and all marched quietly in organized lines. This year Rodwell remembered feeling restricted by the rules Kameny had set. When two women spontaneously held hands, Kameny broke them apart, saying, "None of that! None of that!" Rodwell, however, convinced about ten couples to hold hands. The hand-holding couples made Kameny furious, but they earned more press attention than all of the previous marches. Participant Lilli Vincenz remembered, "It was clear that things were changing. People who had felt oppressed now felt empowered." Rodwell returned to New York City determined to change the established quiet, meek ways of trying to get attention. One of his first priorities was planning Christopher Street Liberation Day.

=== Gay Liberation Front ===
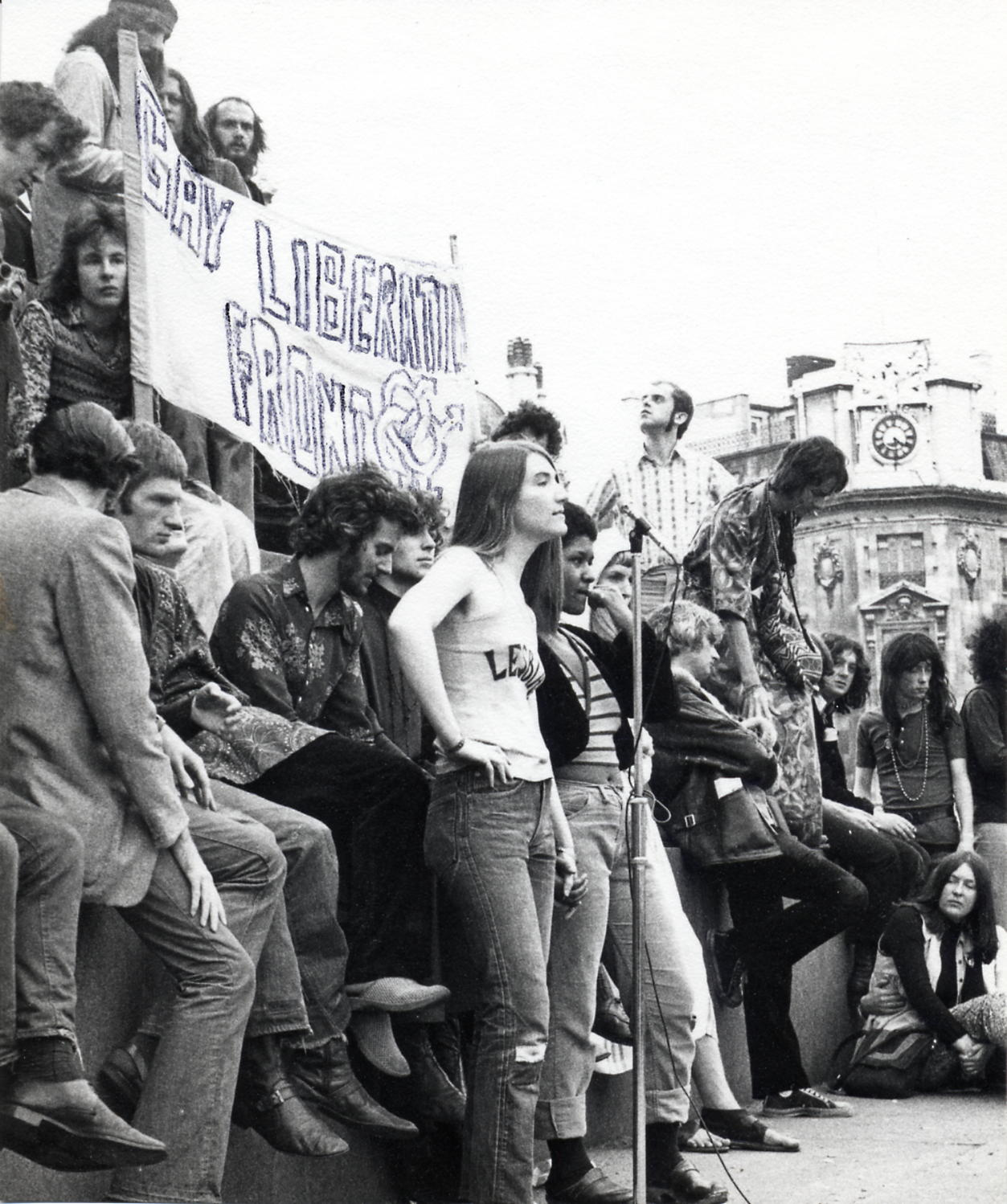
Gay rights demonstration in Trafalgar Square, London, including members of the Gay Liberation Front (GLF). The GLF in the UK held its first meeting in a basement classroom at the London School of Economics on October 13, 1970. The organization was very informal, instituting marches and other activities, leading to the first British Gay Pride March in 1972.

Although the Mattachine Society had existed since the 1950s, many of their methods now seemed too mild for people who had witnessed or been inspired by the riots. Mattachine recognized the shift in attitudes in a story from their newsletter entitled, "The Hairpin Drop Heard Around the World." (Note: "Hairpin drop" was gay slang that meant to drop hints about one's sexual orientation.) When a Mattachine officer suggested an "amicable and sweet" candlelight vigil demonstration, a man in the audience fumed and shouted, "Sweet! Bullshit! That's the role society has been forcing these queens to play." With a flyer announcing: "Do You Think Homosexuals Are Revolting? You Bet Your Sweet Ass We Are!", the Gay Liberation Front (GLF) was soon formed, the first gay organization to use gay in its name. Previous organizations such as the Mattachine Society, the Daughters of Bilitis (DOB), and various homophile groups had masked their purpose by deliberately choosing obscure names.

The rise of militancy became apparent to Frank Kameny and Barbara Gittings—who had worked in homophile organizations for years and were both very public about their roles—when they attended a GLF meeting to see the new group. A young GLF member demanded to know who they were and what their credentials were. Gittings, nonplussed, stammered, "I'm gay. That's why I'm here." The GLF borrowed tactics from and aligned themselves with black and antiwar demonstrators with the ideal that they "could work to restructure American society." They took on causes of the Black Panthers, marching to the Women's House of Detention in support of Afeni Shakur and other radical New Left causes. Four months after the group formed, however, it disbanded when members were unable to agree on operating procedure.

=== Gay Activists Alliance ===
Within six months of the Stonewall riots, activists started a citywide newspaper called Gay; they considered it necessary because the most liberal publication in the city—The Village Voice—refused to print the word gay in GLF advertisements seeking new members and volunteers. Two other newspapers were initiated within a six-week period: Come Out! and Gay Power.

GLF members organized several same-sex dances, but GLF meetings were chaotic. When Bob Kohler asked for clothes and money to help the homeless youth who had participated in the riots, many of whom slept in Christopher Park or Sheridan Square, the response was a discussion on the downfall of capitalism. In late December 1969, several people who had visited GLF meetings and left out of frustration formed the Gay Activists Alliance (GAA). The GAA was to be more orderly and entirely focused on gay issues. Their constitution began, "We as liberated homosexual activists demand the freedom for expression of our dignity and value as human beings." The GAA developed and perfected a confrontational tactic called a zap: they would catch a politician off guard during a public relations opportunity and force him or her to acknowledge gay and lesbian rights. City councilmen were zapped and mayor John Lindsay was zapped several times—once on television when GAA members made up the majority of the audience.

Police raids on gay bars did not stop after the Stonewall riots. In March 1970, deputy inspector Seymour Pine raided the Zodiac and 17 Barrow Street. An after-hours gay club with no liquor or occupancy licenses called The Snake Pit was soon raided and 167 people were arrested. One of them was Diego Viñales, an Argentinian national so frightened that he might be deported as a homosexual that he tried to escape the police precinct by jumping out of a two-story window, impaling himself on a 14-inch (36 cm) spike fence. The New York Daily News printed a graphic photo of the young man's impalement on the front page. GAA members organized a march from Christopher Park to the Sixth Precinct in which hundreds of gay men, lesbians, and liberal sympathizers peacefully confronted the TPF. They also sponsored a letter-writing campaign to Mayor Lindsay in which the Greenwich Village Democratic Party and congressman Ed Koch sent pleas to end raids on gay bars in the city.

The Stonewall Inn lasted only a few weeks after the riot. By October 1969 it was up for rent. Village residents surmised it was too notorious a location and Rodwell's boycott discouraged business.

=== Gay Pride ===
Gay and Proud, a 1970 film by Lilli Vincenz documenting the first Christopher Street Liberation Day

Christopher Street Liberation Day, on June 28, 1970, marked the first anniversary of the Stonewall riots with an assembly on Christopher Street; with simultaneous Gay Pride marches in Los Angeles and Chicago, these were the first Gay Pride marches in US history. The next year, Gay Pride marches took place in Boston, Dallas, Milwaukee, London, Paris, West Berlin and Stockholm. The march in New York covered 51 blocks, from Christopher Street to Central Park. The march took less than half the scheduled time due to excitement, but also due to wariness about walking through the city with gay banners and signs. Although the parade permit was delivered only two hours before the start of the march, the marchers encountered little resistance from onlookers. The New York Times reported (on the front page) that the marchers took up the entire street for about 15 city blocks. Reporting by The Village Voice was positive, describing "the out-front resistance that grew out of the police raid on the Stonewall Inn one year ago".

There was little open animosity and some bystanders applauded when a tall, pretty girl carrying a sign "I am a Lesbian" walked by.

— The New York Times coverage of Gay Liberation Day, 1970

By 1972, the participating cities included Atlanta, Buffalo, Detroit, Washington, D.C., Miami, Minneapolis, and Philadelphia, as well as San Francisco.

Frank Kameny soon realized the pivotal change brought by the Stonewall riots. An organizer of gay activism in the 1950s, he was used to persuasion, trying to convince heterosexuals that gay people were no different from them. When he and other people marched in front of the White House, the State Department, and Independence Hall only five years earlier, their objective was to look as if they could work for the US government. Ten people marched with Kameny then and they alerted no press to their intentions. Although he was stunned by the upheaval by participants in the Annual Reminder in 1969, he later observed, "By the time of Stonewall, we had fifty to sixty gay groups in the country. A year later there were at least fifteen hundred. By two years later, to the extent that a count could be made, it was twenty-five hundred."

Similar to Kameny's regret at his own reaction to the shift in attitudes after the riots, Randy Wicker came to describe his embarrassment as "one of the greatest mistakes of his life". The image of gay people retaliating against police, after so many years of allowing such treatment to go unchallenged, "stirred an unexpected spirit among many homosexuals". Kay Lahusen, who photographed the marches in 1965, stated, "Up to 1969, this movement was generally called the homosexual or homophile movement ... Many new activists consider the Stonewall uprising the birth of the gay liberation movement. Certainly, it was the birth of gay pride on a massive scale." David Carter explained that even though there were several uprisings before Stonewall, the reason Stonewall was so significant was that thousands of people were involved, the riot lasted a long time (six days), it was the first to get major media coverage, and it sparked the formation of many gay rights groups.

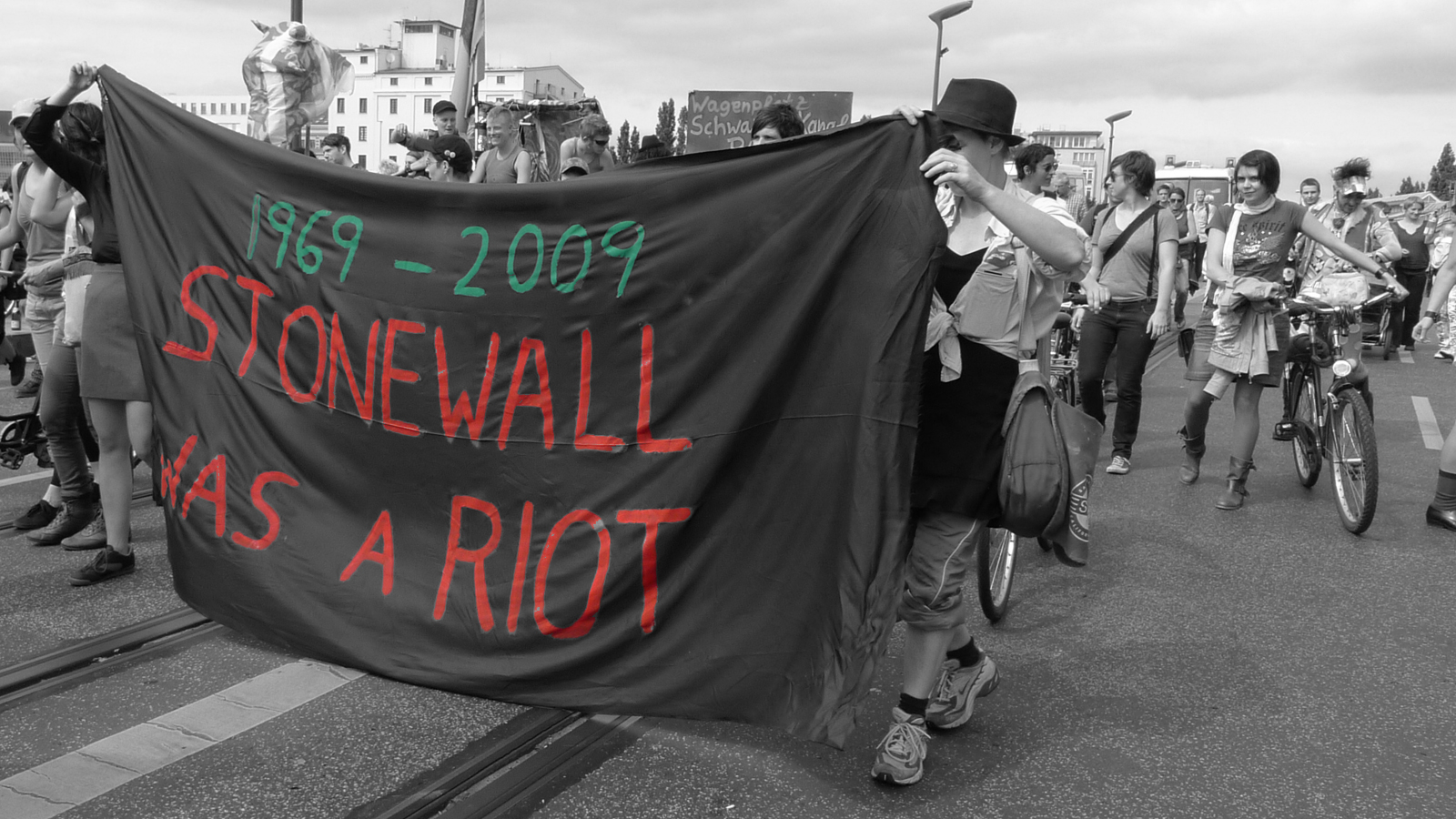
Banner reading "Stonewall was a riot" pictured during Berlin Pride, 2009

=== Trans organizations ===
According to Susan Stryker's book, Transgender History, the Stonewall riots had significant effects on trans rights activism. Sylvia Rivera and Marsha P. Johnson established the Street Transvestite Action Revolutionaries (STAR) organization, as they believed that trans people weren't being adequately represented in the Gay Activists Alliance and Gay Liberation Front. They established politicized versions of "houses", which came from Black and Latino queer communities, and were places that marginalized trans youth could seek shelter.

Besides STAR, organizations such as Transvestites and Transsexuals (TAT) and Queens' Liberation Front (QLF) were also established. QLF, which was established by drag queen Lee Brewster and heterosexual transvestite Bunny Eisenhower, marched on Christopher Street Liberation Day and fought against drag erasure and for trans visibility.

== Legacy ==
The Stonewall riots are often considered to be the origin or impetus of the gay liberation movement, and many studies of LGBTQ history in the U.S. are divided into pre- and post-Stonewall analyses. This has been criticized by historians of sexuality. Calls for the rights of gender and sexual minorities predate the Stonewall riots. The first homosexual movement began one hundred years earlier, in Germany. West Germany had abolished criminal liability for homosexual acts among adults over 21 years of age through a change of Section 175 of the German Criminal Code on June 25, 1969 − just three days before the Stonewall riots began. There was already the emergence of a gay liberation movement in New York at the time of the riots. The Stonewall riots were not the only time LGBTQ people organized politically amid attacks on LGBTQ establishments. The event has been said to occupy a unique place in the collective memory of many LGBTQ people, including those outside of the United States, as it "is marked by an international commemorative ritual – an annual gay pride parade", according to sociologist Elizabeth A. Armstrong.

Jean O'Leary speaks at 1973 NYC Pride.

=== Community ===
Within two years of the Stonewall riots, there were gay rights groups in every major American city, as well as in Canada, Australia, and Western Europe. People who joined activist organizations after the riots had very little in common other than their same-sex attraction. Many who arrived at GLF or GAA meetings were taken aback by the number of gay people in one place. Race, class, ideology, and gender became frequent obstacles in the years after the riots. This was illustrated during the 1973 Stonewall rally when, moments after Barbara Gittings exuberantly praised the diversity of the crowd, feminist activist Jean O'Leary protested what she perceived as the mocking of women by cross-dressers and drag queens in attendance. Sylvia Rivera, not originally planned to speak at the event, made her way onstage and took the microphone, giving her famous "Y'all Better Quiet Down" speech to the crowd. After, during a statement by O'Leary, in which she claimed that drag queens made fun of women for entertainment value and profit, Lee Brewster took the stage and gave his own speech, saying, "You go to bars because of what drag queens did for you and these bitches tell us to quit being ourselves!" Both the drag queens and lesbian feminists in attendance left in disgust.

O'Leary also worked in the early 1970s to exclude transgender people from gay rights issues because she felt that rights for transgender people would be too difficult to attain. Sylvia Rivera left New York City in the mid-1970s, relocating to upstate New York. She later returned to the city in the mid-1990s, after the 1992 death of friend Marsha P. Johnson. Rivera lived on the "gay pier" at the end of Christopher street and advocated for homeless members of the gay community. The initial disagreements among participants in the movements often evolved after further reflection. O'Leary later regretted her stance against the drag queens attending in 1973: "Looking back, I find this so embarrassing because my views have changed so much since then. I would never pick on a transvestite now." "It was horrible. How could I work to exclude transvestites and at the same time criticize the feminists who were doing their best back in those days to exclude lesbians?"

O'Leary was referring to the Lavender Menace, an appellation by second-wave feminist Betty Friedan based on attempts by members of the National Organization for Women (NOW) to distance themselves from the perception of NOW as a haven for lesbians. As part of this process, Rita Mae Brown and other lesbians who had been active in NOW were forced out. They staged a protest in 1970 at the Second Congress to Unite Women and earned the support of many NOW members, finally gaining full acceptance in 1971.

The growth of lesbian feminism in the 1970s at times so conflicted with the gay liberation movement that some lesbians refused to work with gay men. Many lesbians found men's attitudes patriarchal and chauvinistic and saw in gay men the same misguided notions about women that they saw in heterosexual men. The issues most important to gay men—entrapment and public solicitation—were not shared by lesbians. In 1977, a Lesbian Pride Rally was organized as an alternative to sharing gay men's issues, especially what Adrienne Rich termed "the violent, self-destructive world of the gay bars". Veteran gay activist Barbara Gittings chose to work in the gay rights movement, explaining, "It's a matter of where does it hurt the most? For me it hurts the most not in the female arena, but the gay arena."

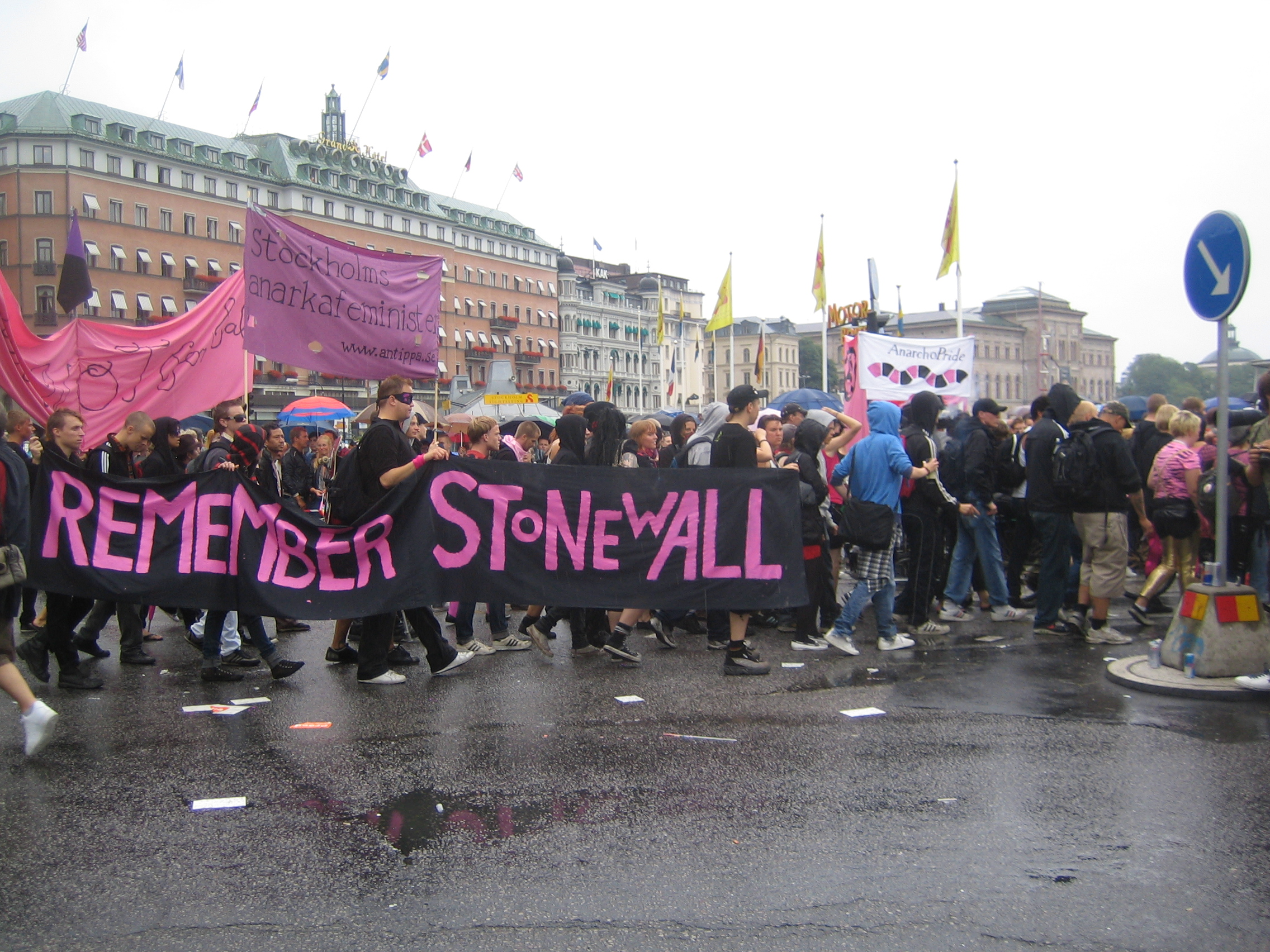
Queer anarchists at Stockholm Pride with banner reading "Remember Stonewall"

Throughout the 1970s, gay activism had significant successes. One of the first and most important was the "zap" in May 1970 by the Los Angeles GLF at a convention of the American Psychiatric Association (APA). At a conference on behavior modification, during a film demonstrating the use of electroshock therapy to decrease same-sex attraction, Morris Kight and GLF members in the audience interrupted the film with shouts of "Torture!" and "Barbarism!" They took over the microphone to announce that medical professionals who prescribed such therapy for their homosexual patients were complicit in torturing them. Although 20 psychiatrists in attendance left, the GLF spent the hour following the zap with those remaining, trying to convince them that homosexual people were not mentally ill. When the APA invited gay activists to speak to the group in 1972, activists brought John E. Fryer, a gay psychiatrist who wore a mask, because he felt his practice was in danger. In December 1973—in large part due to the efforts of gay activists—the APA voted unanimously to remove homosexuality from the Diagnostic and Statistical Manual.

Gay men and lesbians came together to work in grassroots political organizations responding to organized resistance in 1977. A coalition of conservatives named Save Our Children staged a campaign to repeal a civil rights ordinance in Miami-Dade County. Save Our Children was successful enough to influence similar repeals in several American cities in 1978. However, that same year, a campaign in California called the Briggs Initiative, designed to force the dismissal of homosexual public school employees, was defeated. Reaction to the influence of Save Our Children and the Briggs Initiative in the gay community was so significant that it has been called the second Stonewall for many activists, marking their initiation into political participation. The subsequent 1979 National March on Washington for Lesbian and Gay Rights was timed to coincide with the tenth anniversary of the Stonewall riots.

=== Rejection of prior gay subculture ===
The Stonewall riots marked such a significant turning point that many aspects of prior gay and lesbian culture, such as bar culture formed from decades of shame and secrecy, were forcefully ignored and denied. Historian Martin Duberman writes, "The decades preceding Stonewall ... continue to be regarded by most gay men and lesbians as some vast neolithic wasteland." Sociologist Barry Adam notes, "Every social movement must choose at some point what to retain and what to reject out of its past. What traits are the results of oppression and what are healthy and authentic?" In conjunction with the growing feminist movement of the early 1970s, roles of butch and femme that developed in lesbian bars in the 1950s and 1960s were rejected, because as one writer put it: "all role playing is sick." Lesbian feminists considered the butch roles as archaic imitations of masculine behavior. Some women, according to Lillian Faderman, were eager to shed the roles they felt forced into playing. The roles returned for some women in the 1980s, although they allowed for more flexibility than before Stonewall.

Author Michael Bronski highlights the "attack on pre-Stonewall culture", particularly gay pulp fiction for men, where the themes often reflected self-hatred or ambivalence about being gay. Many books ended unsatisfactorily and drastically, often with suicide, and writers portrayed their gay characters as alcoholics or deeply unhappy. These books, which he describes as "an enormous and cohesive literature by and for gay men", have not been reissued and are lost to later generations. Dismissing the notion that the rejection was motivated by political correctness, Bronski writes, "gay liberation was a youth movement whose sense of history was defined to a large degree by rejection of the past."

The Stonewall Veterans Association still advocates for gay rights.

=== Impact and recognition ===
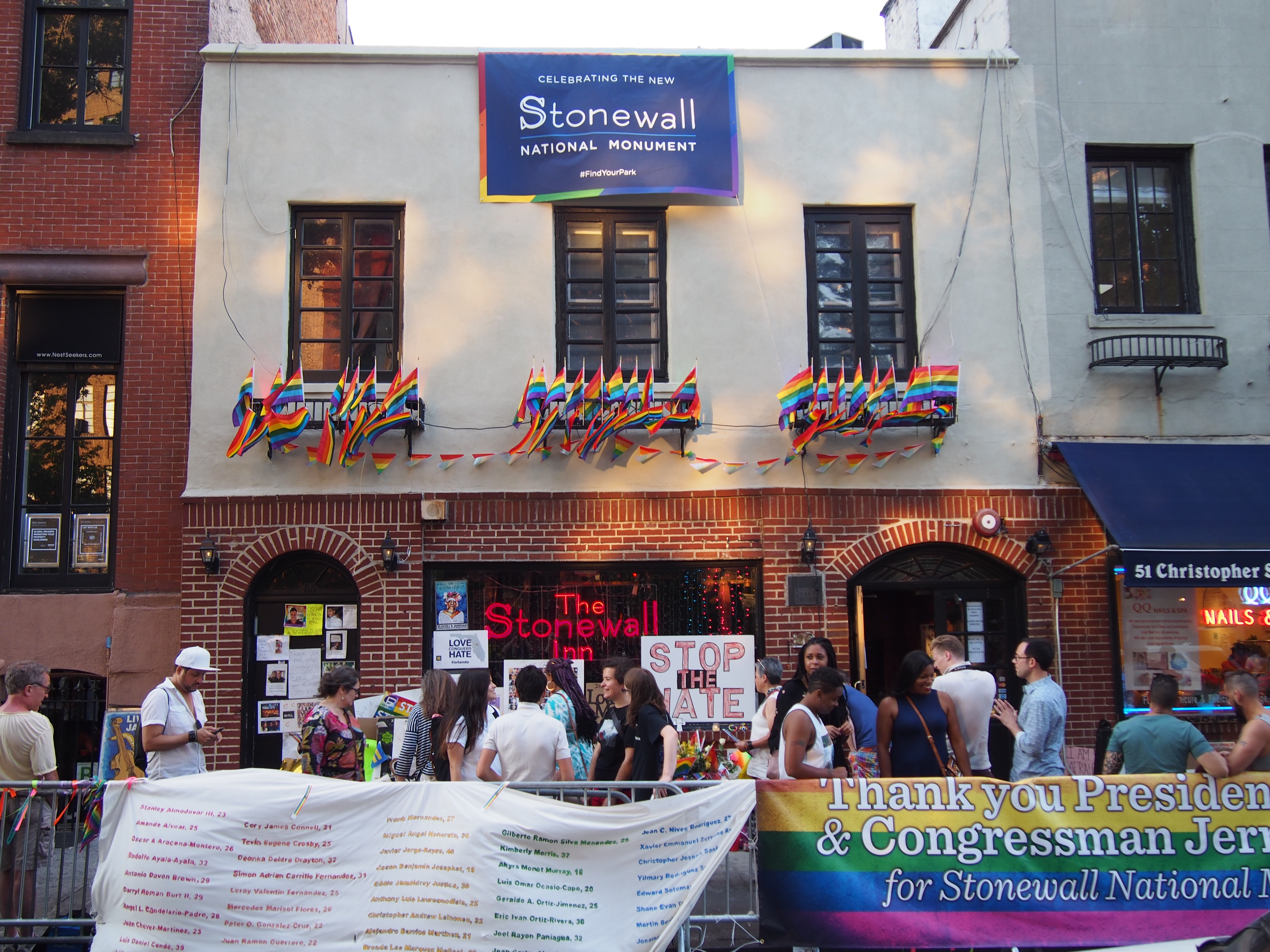
The modern Stonewall Inn, occupying one of the original Stonewall Inn's two buildings. The buildings and the surrounding streets have been declared a National Historic Landmark.

The riots spawned from a bar raid became a literal example of gay men and lesbians fighting back and a symbolic call to arms for many people. Historian David Carter remarks in his book about the Stonewall riots that the bar itself was a complex business that represented a community center, an opportunity for the Mafia to blackmail its own customers, a home, and a place of "exploitation and degradation". The true legacy of the Stonewall riots, Carter insists, is the "ongoing struggle for lesbian, gay, bisexual, and transgender equality". Historian Nicholas Edsall writes:

Stonewall has been compared to any number of acts of radical protest and defiance in American history from the Boston Tea Party on. But the best and certainly a more nearly contemporary analogy is Rosa Parks' refusal to move to the back of the bus in Montgomery, Alabama, in December 1955, which sparked the modern civil rights movement. Within months after Stonewall, radical gay liberation groups and newsletters sprang up in cities and on college campuses across America and then across all of northern Europe as well.

Before the rebellion at the Stonewall Inn, homosexuals were, as historians Dudley Clendinen and Adam Nagourney write:

a secret legion of people, known of but discounted, ignored, laughed at or despised. And like the holders of a secret, they had an advantage which was a disadvantage too, and which was true of no other minority group in the United States. They were invisible. Unlike African Americans, women, Native Americans, Jews, the Irish, Italians, Asians, Hispanics, or any other cultural group which struggled for respect and equal rights, homosexuals had no physical or cultural markings, no language or dialect which could identify them to each other, or to anyone else ... But that night, for the first time, the usual acquiescence turned into violent resistance ... From that night the lives of millions of gay men and lesbians and the attitude toward them of the larger culture in which they lived, began to change rapidly. People began to appear in public as homosexuals, demanding respect.

Historian Lillian Faderman calls the riots the "shot heard round the world", explaining, "The Stonewall Rebellion was crucial because it sounded the rally for that movement. It became an emblem of gay and lesbian power. By calling on the dramatic tactic of violent protest that was being used by other oppressed groups, the events at the Stonewall implied that homosexuals had as much reason to be disaffected as they."

Janet Cooper and Israel Fishman created the American Library Association's Task Force on Gay Liberation in 1970, which was the first gay and lesbian U.S. professional group. Fishman recounted that the Stonewall riots emboldened and inspired him to create the task force. The task force created the Gay Book Award in 1971, later renamed to the Stonewall Book Award.

Joan Nestle co-founded the Lesbian Herstory Archives in 1974 and credits "its creation to that night and the courage that found its voice in the streets." Cautious, however, not to attribute the start of gay activism to the Stonewall riots, Nestle writes:

I certainly don't see gay and lesbian history starting with Stonewall ... and I don't see resistance starting with Stonewall. What I do see is a historical coming together of forces, and the sixties changed how human beings endured things in this society and what they refused to endure ... Certainly, something special happened on that night in 1969 and we've made it more special in our need to have what I call a point of origin ... it's more complex than saying that it all started with Stonewall.

The events of the early morning of June 28, 1969, were not the first instances of gay men and lesbians fighting back against police in New York City and elsewhere. Not only had the Mattachine Society been active in major cities such as Los Angeles and Chicago, but similarly marginalized people started the riot at Compton's Cafeteria in 1966 and another riot responded to a raid on Los Angeles' Black Cat Tavern in 1967. However, several circumstances were in play that made the Stonewall riots memorable. The location of the Lower Manhattan raid was a factor: it was across the street from The Village Voice offices, and the narrow crooked streets gave the rioters an advantage over the police. Many of the participants and residents of Greenwich Village were involved in political organizations that were effectively able to mobilize a large and cohesive gay community in the weeks and months after the rebellion. The most significant facet of the Stonewall riots, however, was the commemoration of them in Christopher Street Liberation Day, which grew into the annual Gay Pride events around the world.

Stonewall (officially Stonewall Equality Limited) is an LGBTQ rights charity in the United Kingdom, founded in 1989 and named after the Stonewall Inn because of the Stonewall riots. The Stonewall Awards is an annual event the charity has held since 2006 to recognize people who have affected the lives of British lesbian, gay, and bisexual people.

The middle of the 1990s was marked by the inclusion of bisexuals as a represented group within the gay community, when they successfully sought to be included on the platform of the 1993 March on Washington for Lesbian, Gay and Bi Equal Rights and Liberation. Transgender people also asked to be included but were not, though trans-inclusive language was added to the march's list of demands. The transgender community continued to find itself simultaneously welcome and at odds with the gay community as attitudes about non-binary gender discrimination and pansexual orientation developed and came increasingly into conflict. In 1994, New York City celebrated "Stonewall 25" with a march that went past the United Nations Headquarters and into Central Park. Estimates put the attendance at 1.1 million people. Sylvia Rivera led an alternate march in New York City in 1994 to protest the exclusion of transgender people from the events.

Attendance at LGBTQ Pride events has grown substantially over the decades. Most large cities around the world now have some kind of Pride demonstration; Pride events in some cities mark the largest annual celebration of any kind. The growing trend towards commercializing marches into parades—with events receiving corporate sponsorship—has caused concern about taking away the autonomy of the original grassroots demonstrations.

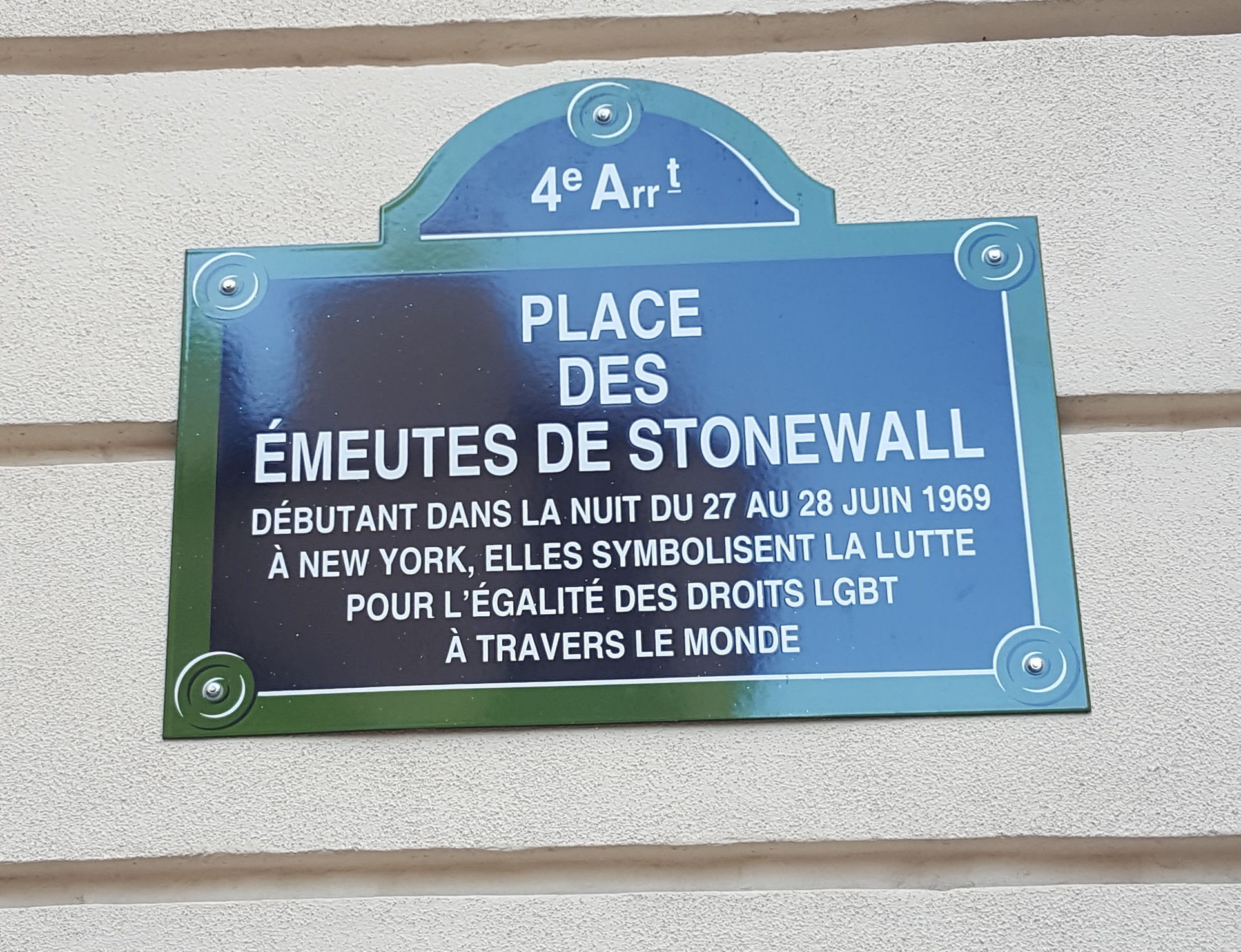
In Paris (France), town square commemorating the Stonewall Riots

President Barack Obama declared June 2009 Lesbian, Gay, Bisexual, and Transgender Pride Month, citing the riots as a reason to "commit to achieving equal justice under law for LGBT Americans". The year marked the 40th anniversary of the riots. Prompted by the Obama administration's continued legal defense of the Defense of Marriage Act – following longstanding practice by the Department of Justice to defend all federal laws in court – an editorial in the Washington Blade compared the scruffy, violent activism during and following the Stonewall riots to the lackluster response to failed promises given by President Obama; for being ignored, wealthy LGBTQ activists reacted by promising to give less money to Democratic causes. Two years later, the Stonewall Inn served as a rallying point for celebrations after the New York State Senate voted to pass same-sex marriage. The act was signed into law by Governor Andrew Cuomo on June 24, 2011.

Obama also referenced the Stonewall riots in a call for full equality during his second inaugural address on January 21, 2013:

We, the people, declare today that the most evident of truths—that all of us are created equal—is the star that guides us still; just as it guided our forebears through Seneca Falls and Selma and Stonewall ... Our journey is not complete until our gay brothers and sisters are treated like anyone else under the law—for if we are truly created equal, then surely the love we commit to one another must be equal as well.

This was a historic moment: the first time that a president mentioned gay rights or the word "gay" in an inaugural address.

Throughout June 2019, Stonewall 50 – WorldPride NYC 2019, produced by Heritage of Pride in partnership with the I Love New York program's LGBTQ division, took place in New York to commemorate the 50th anniversary of the Stonewall uprising. The final official estimate included 5 million visitors attending in Manhattan alone, making it the largest LGBTQ celebration in history. June is traditionally Pride month in New York City and worldwide, and the events were held under the auspices of the annual NYC Pride March. On June 6, 2019, coinciding with WorldPride being celebrated in New York City, Police Commissioner James P. O'Neill apologized on behalf of the NYPD for the actions of its officers at the Stonewall uprising.

The official 50th-anniversary commemoration of the Stonewall Uprising occurred on June 28, 2019, on Christopher Street in front of Stonewall Inn. The official commemoration was themed as a rally, in reference to the original rallies in front of Stonewall Inn in 1969. Speakers at this event included mayor Bill De Blasio, senator Kirsten Gillibrand, congressman Jerry Nadler, American activist X González, and global activist Rémy Bonny.

Also in June 2019, to coincide with the fifty-year anniversary of the Stonewall riots, steps at the Franklin D. Roosevelt Four Freedoms Park were turned into the largest LGBTQ pride flag. The rainbow-decorated 12-by-100-foot (3.7 m × 30.5 m) staircase Ascend With Pride was installed June 14–30.

Also in 2019, Paris, France, officially named a square in the Marais district as Place des Émeutes-de-Stonewall (Stonewall Riots Place).

==== Stonewall Day ====
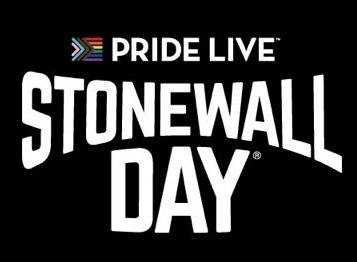
Stonewall Day logo by Pride Live

In 2018, 49 years after the uprising, Stonewall Day was announced as a commemoration day by Pride Live, a social advocacy and community engagement organization. The second Stonewall Day was held on Friday, June 28, 2019, outside the Stonewall Inn. During this event, Pride Live introduced their Stonewall Ambassadors program, to raise awareness for the 50th anniversary of the Stonewall Riots.

=== Historic landmark and monument ===
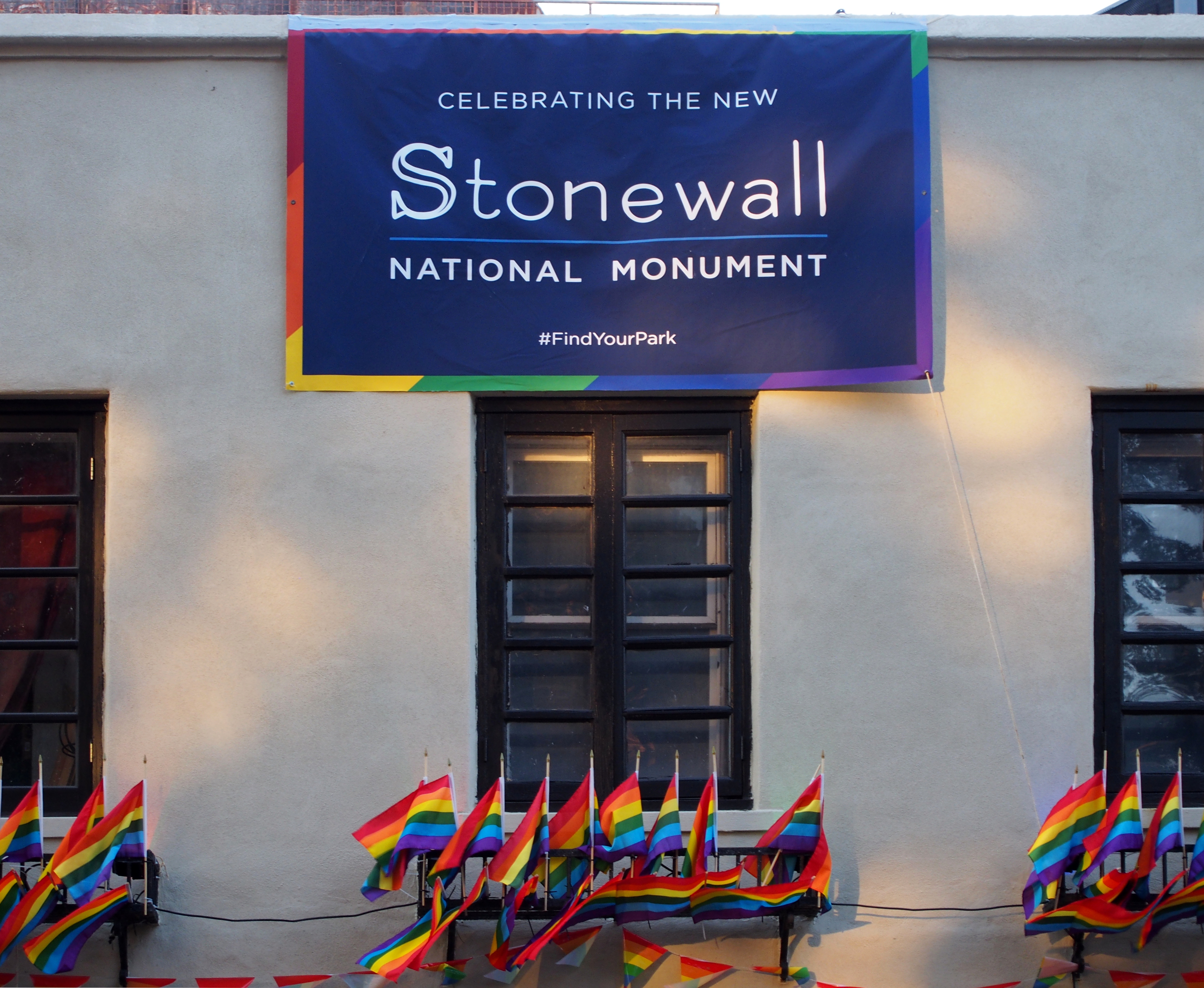
A banner hanging from the top of the building the day after President Obama announced creation of the Stonewall National Monument

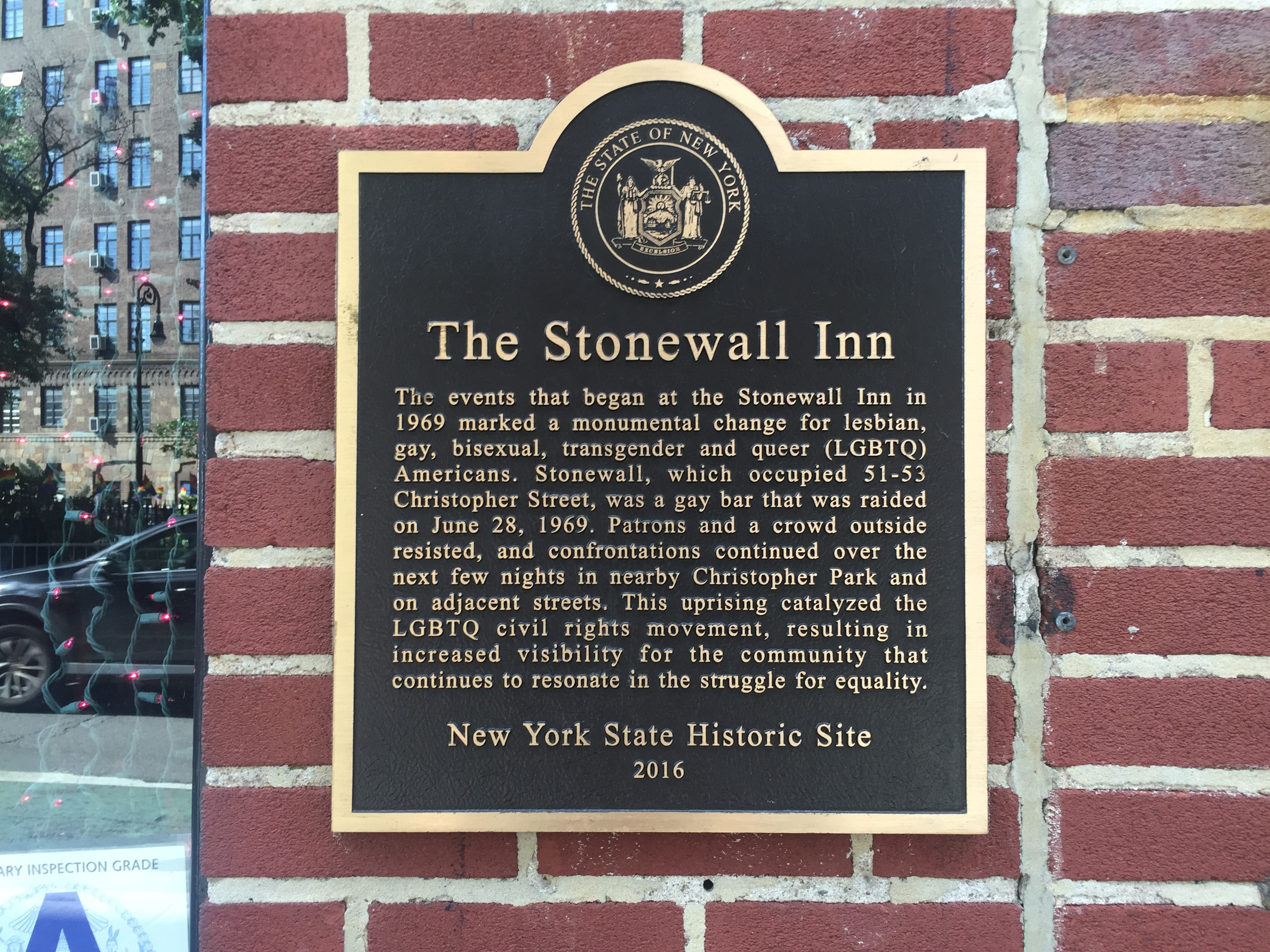
Plaque at the Stonewall Inn commemorating the Stonewall Riots

In June 1999, the US Department of the Interior included 51 and 53 Christopher Street and the surrounding area in Greenwich Village into the National Register of Historic Places, the first of significance to the LGBTQ community. In a dedication ceremony, Assistant Secretary of the Department of the Interior John Berry stated, "Let it forever be remembered that here—on this spot—men and women stood proud, they stood fast, so that we may be who we are, we may work where we will, live where we choose, and love whom our hearts desire." The Stonewall Inn was also named a National Historic Landmark in February 2000. On June 23, 2015, the New York City Landmarks Preservation Commission designated Stonewall as a city landmark, the first to be designated based on its LGBTQ cultural significance alone.

On June 24, 2016, President Barack Obama announced the establishment of the Stonewall National Monument, administered by the National Park Service. The designation protects Christopher Park and adjacent areas totaling more than seven acres; the Stonewall Inn is within the boundaries of the monument but remains privately owned. The National Park Foundation formed a new nonprofit organization to raise funds for a ranger station and interpretive exhibits for the monument, including the first official national visitor center dedicated to the LGBTQ+ experience, which was inaugurated on June 28, 2024. The New York City Subway's Christopher Street–Sheridan Square station was renamed the Christopher Street–Stonewall station on the same day.

=== Removal of references to transgender and bisexual people ===
On February 13, 2025, references to transgender and queer people were removed from the monument's official website, prompting protests. On July 10, 2025, references to bisexual people were removed as well.

== Media representations ==
No newsreel or TV footage was taken of the riots and few home movies and photographs exist, but those that do have been used in documentaries.

=== Film ===
- Before Stonewall: The Making of a Gay and Lesbian Community (1984), a documentary on the decades leading up to the Stonewall Rebellion
- Stonewall (1995), a dramatic presentation of the events leading up to the riots
- After Stonewall (1999), a documentary of the years from Stonewall to the century's end
- Stonewall Uprising (2010), a documentary using archival footage, photographs, documents, and witness statements
- Stonewall (2015), a drama about a fictional protagonist who interacts with fictionalized versions of some of the people in and around the riots
- Happy Birthday, Marsha! (2016), a short, experimental drama, inspired by some of the legends surrounding gay and transgender rights activists Marsha P. Johnson and Sylvia Rivera, set on the night of the riots

=== Music ===
- Activist Madeline Davis wrote the folk song "Stonewall Nation" in 1971 after attending her first gay civil rights march. Released on Mark Custom Recording Service, it is widely regarded as the first gay liberation record, with lyrics that "celebrate the resiliency and potential power of radical gay activism".
- The song "'69: Judy Garland", written by Stephin Merritt and appearing on 50 Song Memoir by The Magnetic Fields, centers on the Stonewall Riots and the idea that they were caused by the death of Judy Garland six days earlier, on June 22, 1969.
- New York City Opera commissioned the English composer Iain Bell and American librettist Mark Campbell in 2018 to write the opera Stonewall to commemorate the 50th anniversary of the riots, to be premiered on June 19, 2019 and directed by Leonard Foglia.
- The Stonewall Celebration Concert is the debut studio album by Renato Russo, released in 1994. The album was a tribute to twenty-five years of the Stonewall riots in New York. Part of the royalties was donated to Ação da Cidadania Contra a Fome, a Miséria e Pela Vida (Citizen Action Against Hunger and Poverty and for Life) campaign.
- The concert band piece A Mother of A Revolution! by American composer Omar Thomas was written in 2019 to commemorate the 50th anniversary of the riots, incorporating music reminiscent of both superhero films and disco as a "celebration of the bravery of trans women" and to "honor club culture, a sacred space held amongst LGBTQ persons".

=== Theatre ===
- Street Theatre (1982) by Doric Wilson

== See also ==
- Christopher Street Day
- LGBTQ culture in New York City
- LGBTQ history in New York
- LGBTQ rights in New York
- Queer Liberation March
- Transgender culture of New York City

Analogous events

- Dance of the Forty-One (1901), Mexico
- Ariston Bathhouse raid (1903), the first anti-gay police raid in New York City
- Harlem riot (1964), another riot that involved NYPD's Tactical Patrol Force; it was caused by police brutality on an African-American teen.
- Huanchaca street scandal (June 15, 1969), Chile
- Operation Soap (1981), Toronto, Canada
- Sex Garage raid (1990), Montreal, Canada
- Tasty nightclub raid (1994), dubbed "Australia's Stonewall"
- Bar Abanicos police raid (1997), Ecuador
- Rainbow Night (2020), dubbed "Polish Stonewall"

== Sources ==
- Adam, Barry (1987). The Rise of a Gay and Lesbian Movement. G. K. Hall & Co. ISBN 978-0-8057-9714-5.
- Bronski, Michael, ed. (2003). Pulp Friction: Uncovering the Golden Age of Gay Male Pulps. St. Martin's Griffin. ISBN 978-0-312-25267-0.
- Cain, Paul (2007). Leading the Parade: Conversations with America's Most Influential Lesbians and Gay Men. Scarecrow Press, Inc. ISBN 978-0-8108-5913-5.
- Carter, David (2004). Stonewall: The Riots that Sparked the Gay Revolution. St. Martin's Press. ISBN 978-0-312-34269-2.
- Clendinen, Dudley; Adam, Nagourney (1999). Out for Good. Simon & Schuster. ISBN 978-0-684-81091-1.
- Deitcher, David, ed. (1995). The Question of Equality: Lesbian and Gay Politics in America Since Stonewall. Scribner. ISBN 978-0-684-80030-1.
- Duberman, Martin (1993). Stonewall. Penguin Books. ISBN 978-0-525-93602-2.
- Edsall, Nicholas (2003). Toward Stonewall: Homosexuality and Society in the Modern Western World. University of Virginia Press. ISBN 978-0-8139-2211-9.
- Faderman, Lillian (1991). Odd Girls and Twilight Lovers: A History of Lesbian Life in Twentieth Century America. Penguin Books. ISBN 978-0-14-017122-8.
- Faderman, Lillian; Timmons, Stuart (2006). Gay L.A.: A History of Sexual Outlaws, Power Politics and Lipstick Lesbians. Basic Books. ISBN 978-0-465-02288-5..
- Fejes, Fred (2008). Gay Rights and Moral Panic: The Origins of America's Debate on Homosexuality. Palgrave MacMillan. ISBN 978-1-4039-8069-4.
- Gallo, Marcia (2006). Different Daughters: A History of the Daughters of Bilitis and the Rise of the Lesbian Rights Movement. Seal Press. ISBN 978-1-58005-252-8.
- Hoffman, Amy (2007). An Army of Ex-Lovers: My life at the Gay Community News. University of Massachusetts Press. ISBN 9781558496217. OCLC 134990244.
- Katz, Jonathan (1976). Gay American History: Lesbians and Gay Men in the U.S.A. Thomas Y. Crowell Company. ISBN 978-0-690-01165-4.
- LaFrank, Kathleen, ed. (January 1999). National Historic Landmark Nomination: Stonewall (PDF). US Department of the Interior: National Park Service. Archived (PDF) from the original on April 29, 2016.
- Marcus, Eric (2002). Making Gay History. HarperCollins. ISBN 978-0-06-093391-3.
- Teal, Donn (1971). The Gay Militants. St. Martin's Press. ISBN 978-0-312-11279-0.
- Williams, Walter; Retter, Yolanda, eds. (2003). Gay and Lesbian Rights in the United States: A Documentary History. Greenwood Press. ISBN 978-0-313-30696-9.
- Witt, Lynn; Thomas, Sherry; Marcus, Eric, eds. (1995). Out in All Directions: The Almanac of Gay and Lesbian America. New York: Warner Books. ISBN 978-0-446-67237-5.
