= Ellen Broidy =

American LGBT rights activist

- Education: New York University; University of California, Irvine
- Occupations: Professor and research librarian
- Known for: Gay rights activism

Ellen Broidy is an American gay rights activist. She was one of the proposers and a co-organizer of the first gay pride march.

== Early life ==
Broidy grew up in Peter Cooper Village, a housing project in New York City. Broidy says she knew she was a lesbian "when [she] was eleven, or twelve or thirteen when [she] was in school".

Broidy attended New York University, where she founded and became president of the Student Homophile League, the college’s first LGBTQ organization, that later became NYU Gay Students Liberation. She has a PhD in U.S. history from University of California, Irvine.

== Activism ==
While living in Berkeley, CA, Broidy was a member of the Lesbian School Workers, a group born out of the Gay Teachers and School Workers in 1977.

=== Christopher Street Liberation Day ===
On November 2, 1969, Broidy presented a resolution at the Eastern Regional Conference of Homophile Organizations on behalf of herself, Linda Rhodes, Craig Rodwell and Fred Sargeant, proposing hold an annual march on the last Saturday in June to be called Christopher Street Liberation Day, in honor of the 1969 Stonewall Riots which had taken place on Christopher Street. The motion passed unanimously. Beginning in early 1970, Broidy and the other proposers held regular meetings with members of many different gay rights organizations to organize the march, which was ultimately scheduled for June 28, 1970, the first anniversary of Stonewall.

The Christopher Street Liberation Day March became what is now referred to as Pride. Broidy has been critical of contemporary Pride parades as she feels they have taken on an overly corporate tone and are more of a party than a revolutionary march.

=== Lavender Menace ===
In May 1970, Broidy and other radical feminist lesbians dyed their t-shirts purple and printed the words 'Lavender Menace' on them, in reference to a phrase used by Betty Friedan to describe the perceived threat that association with lesbians brought to the women's rights movement. They wore their shirts to the second Conference to Unite Women in Manhattan, demanding the inclusion of lesbians in what became known as a turning point for the lesbian feminist movement.

=== 21st century ===
In 2019, Broidy expressed disappointment in the efficacy of the various rights movements of the 1960s and '70s, saying "The revolution did not happen." But she was more hopeful a year later, applauding the resurgence of intersectionality in Pride that had happened in the wake of the Black Lives Matter Movement:

"We always believed strongly in what we now call intersectionality, in that statement that none of us are free until all of us are free. Also, the whole revolutionary idea was that none of us wanted a piece of the pie — we literally wanted to blow up the whole bakery. We are in a whole new era now. Regrettably, it took death to bring it about, but there seems to be an energy in the streets. If people can keep this going, the revolution that failed to materialize in 1970 — in spite of the Black power movement, the anti-war movement, the LGBT movement, the women's movement — might just come into being now. I feel more optimistic than I have in a long time."

== Career ==
Broidy worked as a research librarian. She also taught in the women's studies department at the University of California on both the Los Angeles and Irvine campuses. She is now retired.

== Bibliography ==
- "Cyberdykes, or Lesbian Studies in the Information Age" in The New Lesbian Studies (ed. Toni A. H. McNaron and Bonnie Zimmerman, 1982)

== Personal life ==
At the time of the organization of the Christopher Street Liberation Day Parade, Broidy was dating co-organizer Linda Rhodes.

Broidy currently lives in Santa Barbara, California with her spouse, Joan Ariel.
