= Eastern Regional Conference of Homophile Organizations =

US gay rights organisation

East Coast Homophile Organizations (ECHO) was established in January 1963 in Philadelphia, to facilitate cooperation between homophile organizations and outside administrations. Its formative membership included the Mattachine Society chapters in New York and Washington D.C., the Daughters of Bilitis chapter in New York, and the Janus Society in Philadelphia, which met monthly. Philadelphia was chosen as the host city due to its central location among all involved parties.

The organization voted to dissolve in 1966 due to internal issues, but was essentially renewed as the Eastern Regional Conference of Homophile Organizations (ERCHO): a subsidiary of the newly minted North American Conference of Homophile Organizations (NACHO), established in 1966 to better coordinate a larger contingent of homophile organizations. By 1969 ERCHO members included New York's Council on Equality for Homosexuals and the Student Homophile League, Philadelphia's Homophile Action League, Hartford's Institute for Social Ethics, and the West Side Discussion Group, in addition to the original ECHO members.

At the November 1969 ERCHO meeting in Philadelphia, Craig Rodwell, Fred Sargeant, Ellen Broidy and Linda Rhodes submitted a resolution for a march to be held in New York City to commemorate the "spontaneous demonstrations on Christopher Street", which had occurred in June. Most ERCHO members supported the resolution. As a result of the measure, the first Christopher Street Liberation Day demonstrations took place in June 1970, with coordinated events in Chicago (later Chicago Pride Parade), New York (later NYC Pride March), Los Angeles (later Los Angeles Pride), and San Francisco (later San Francisco Pride).

ERCHO, NACHO, and other homophile movements collapsed with the rise of more radical gay liberation politics following the Stonewall riots, and the final NACHO meeting took place in 1970.

== See also ==
- List of LGBT actions in the United States prior to the Stonewall riots
