= Fred Sargeant =

French-American gay rights activist

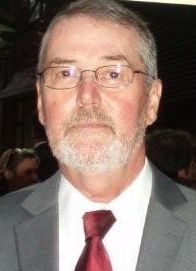
- Sargeant in 2010
- Born: Frédéric André Sargeant; July 29, 1948 (age 78); Fontainebleau, France
- Occupation: Police officer (retired)
- Known for: Participant in the Stonewall riots and co-proposer and organizer of the first annual Gay Pride March
- Website: fredsargeant.com

Frédéric André Sargeant (born July 29, 1948) is a French-American gay rights activist and a former lieutenant with the Stamford, Connecticut Police Department. He participated in each of the nights of the 1969 Stonewall riots and was one of the four co-founders of the first NYC Pride March in Manhattan in 1970. He was vice-chairman of the Homophile Youth Movement at the time.

== Early life ==
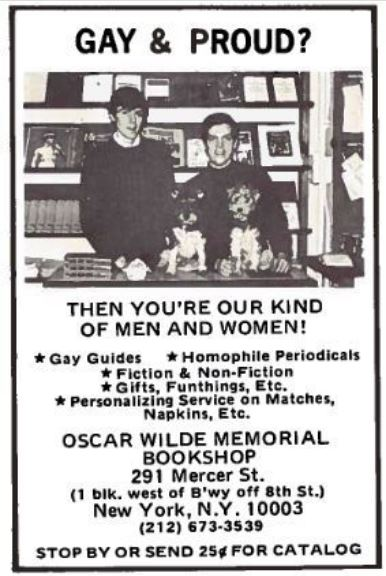
A 1968 magazine advertisement for the Oscar Wilde Memorial Bookshop. Pictured are Fred Sargeant (left) and Craig Rodwell.

Sargeant was born in Fontainebleau, France, to an American G.I. father and a French mother. He grew up in Connecticut.

Sargeant moved to New York City at age nineteen. There, he met and began dating Craig Rodwell, who had recently opened what was then the country's only gay bookstore, the Oscar Wilde Memorial Bookshop in Greenwich Village. The bookshop was a gathering place for young gay activists, and soon Sargeant was managing the store and had become an active member of the Homophile Youth Movement (HYMN), which operated out of it.

== Stonewall riots ==
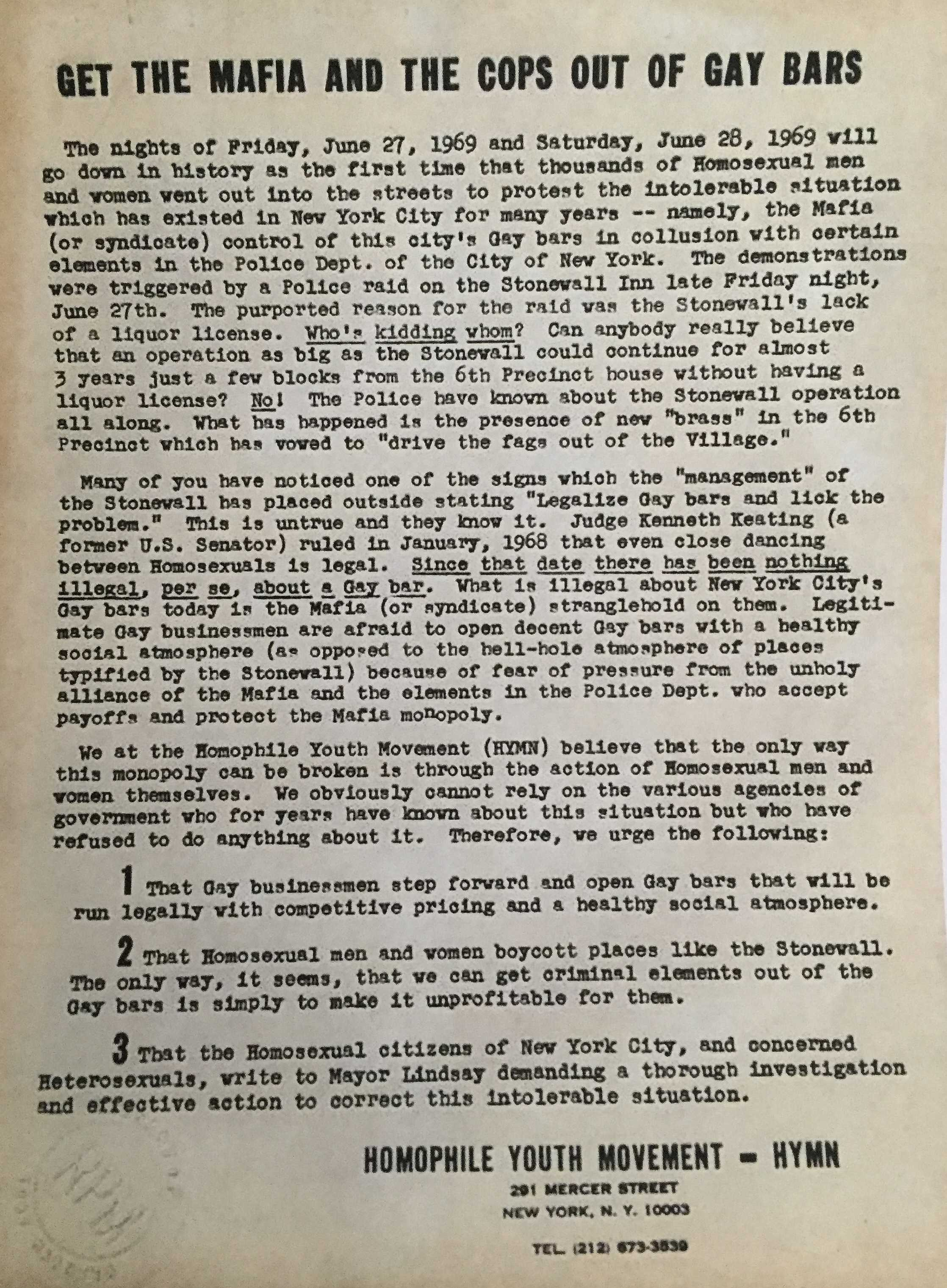
The flyer that Sargent and Rodwell distributed around NYC after the second night of the Stonewall riots

After 1 a.m. on Saturday, June 28, 1969, Sargeant and Rodwell were returning from dinner at a friend's home and were passing the Stonewall Inn, a gay bar and club owned by a member of the Genovese crime family. They saw a crowd of about 75 people gathered outside the Inn and a police car in front, and were told the club had been raided. As police emerged from inside the Stonewall leading a customer, someone began throwing coins at the officers and others joined in throwing objects and yelling insults, eventually forcing the police to retreat back into the building and call for reinforcements. A full-scale riot broke out between the responding Tactical Patrol Force and the crowd that lasted for several hours, with Sargeant and Rodwell staying until the sun came up.

In a radio interview that he gave to WBAI's New Symposium II days after the riot, Sargeant was asked what had set the crowd off and replied:

The kids felt that some of the other kids were being kept inside and being beaten up by the police. I don't know whether it really happened that way or not, but the rumor spread.

At dawn, the couple went back to their apartment, where Rodwell and Sargeant began writing the first of many leaflets calling for the gay community to seize the moment and stand up to the corrupt police and the mafia who controlled their neighborhoods. After returning to the Stonewall again for a second night of rioting on Saturday evening, they released the first leaflet on Sunday, June 29, 1969.

The headline of the first leaflet read Get the Mafia and the Cops Out of Gay Bars, and began,

The nights of Friday, June 27, 1969 and Saturday, June 28, 1969 will go down in history as the first time that thousands of Homosexual men and women went out into the streets to protest the intolerable situation which has existed in New York City for many years -- namely, the Mafia (or syndicate) control of this city's Gay bars in collusion with certain elements in the Police Dept. of the City of New York. The demonstrations were triggered by a Police raid on the Stonewall Inn late Friday night, June 27th. The purported reason for the raid was the Stonewall's lack of a liquor license. Who's kidding whom? Can anybody really believe that an operation as big as the Stonewall could continue for almost 3 years just a few blocks from the 6th Precinct house without having a liquor license? No! The Police have known about the Stonewall operation all along. What has happened is the presence of new "brass" in the 6th Precinct which has vowed to "drive the fags out of the Village."

— Get the Mafia and the Cops Out of Gay Bars

The flyer continues with details about the corruption in the police department, the alliance between some cops and organized crime, the need to legalize Gay bars, and ends with these demands:

1. That Gay businessmen step forward and open Gay bars that will be run legally with competitive pricing and a healthy social atmosphere.
2. That Homosexual men and women boycott places like the Stonewall. The only way, it seems, that we can get criminal elements out of the Gay bars is simply to make it unprofitable for them.
3. That the Homosexual citizens of New York City, and concerned Heterosexuals, write to Mayor Lindsay demanding a thorough investigation and effective action to correct this intolerable situation.

— Homophile Youth Movement - HYMN

Starting that Sunday, Rodwell and Sargeant, aided by a group of volunteers, distributed about 5,000 copies around the city.

== First Gay Pride march ==
As a member of Mattachine, Craig Rodwell had participated in July 4 'Annual Reminders' for gay rights at Independence Hall in Philadelphia. In an effort to make gay integration into society and the workforce seem non-threatening, Mattachine's Frank Kameny insisted on conservative dress and behavior at the protests: women were required to wear skirts and men suits, and no displays of affection were allowed between participants. At the Annual Reminder that was held just a week after the Stonewall riots began, Rodwell and other young activists balked at these restrictions, having come to the conclusion that more aggressive action was needed to achieve civil rights for gay people.

Five months after the Stonewall riots, in November 1969, the Eastern Regional Conference of Homophile Organizations (ERCHO) convened in Philadelphia. At the conference, Ellen Broidy and Linda Rhodes of the lesbian activist group Lavender Menace joined Rodwell and Sargeant in proposing the following resolution:

That the Annual Reminder, in order to be more relevant, reach a greater number of people, and encompass the ideas and ideals of the larger struggle in which we are engaged—that of our fundamental human rights—be moved both in time and location. We propose that a demonstration be held annually on the last Saturday in June in New York City to commemorate the 1969 spontaneous demonstrations on Christopher Street and this demonstration be called CHRISTOPHER STREET LIBERATION DAY. No dress or age regulations shall be made for this demonstration.

Most of the preparation work was done by Sargeant, GLF members Michael Brown and Marty Nixon and Mattachine Society member Foster Gunnison Jr., who acted as treasurer. They utilized the bookshop's mailing list to gather support and participants for the march and negotiated the details with over a dozen different gay advocacy groups including Lavender Menace and the Gay Activists Alliance. Starting in the winter of 1970, Sargeant headed the Eastern Regional Conference of Homophile Organizations clearinghouse of materials for participating member organizations of the march, according to ERCHO Secretary Robert Angell's post of the November 1969 conference informational update.

On the first anniversary of the Stonewall uprising, the Christopher Street Liberation Day March, now considered the first NYC Pride March, began with a few hundred participants in front of the Stonewall Inn. By the time it reached Sheep's Meadow in Central Park 50 blocks later, the marchers numbered in the thousands.

Sargeant marched at the front of the parade and as the only person there with a bullhorn, led the official chant: "Say it loud, gay is proud." He wrote in an article for The Village Voice in 2010:

At one point, I climbed onto the base of a light pole and looked back. I was astonished; we stretched out as far as I could see, thousands of us. There were no floats, no music, no boys in briefs. The cops turned their backs on us to convey their disdain, but the masses of people kept carrying signs and banners, chanting and waving to surprised onlookers.

== Current activism ==
Sargeant supports the LGB Alliance, an anti-transgender advocacy group that describes its objective as "asserting the right of lesbians, bisexuals and gay men to define themselves as same-sex attracted", and states that such a right is threatened by "attempts to introduce confusion between biological sex and the notion of gender."

Sargeant protested at the Burlington VT Pride march and Outright fire truck pull in 2022, carrying a sign containing the words "Black Face" and "Woman Face" crossed out in red. At the event, someone attempted to take his sign.

Sargeant has argued for the need of a 'new gay liberation movement', arguing that credit for starting the Stonewall Riot should be given to Stormé DeLarverie.

== Other work ==
In 1971, Sargeant left New York and returned to Connecticut, where several years later, he decided to become a police officer: "I wanted to see if I could make a difference, and having seen the situation at Stonewall and how the NYPD handled that, I thought I could do it differently. Stonewall wasn't the only riot I saw. I'd been caught up in riots in the Village before and watched what the police did." He went on to attain the rank of lieutenant with the Stamford Police Department before retiring.

== In media ==
Sargeant appeared in the 2011 Peabody Award winning documentary film, Stonewall Uprising.

He wrote the foreword to the 2019 book The Stonewall Riots: Coming Out in the Streets, by Gayle E. Pitman.

He appeared as a historic character in the 2022 graphic history The Stonewall Riots: Making a Stand for LGBTQ Rights, by Archie Bongiovanni.

== Personal life ==
He lives in Vermont with his husband, whom he married in 2010.

== Honors and tributes ==
In 2014, at the 44th annual NYC Pride March, Sargeant was honored as one of the founders of Gay Pride. Once again he led the march with a bullhorn.

On June 18, 2019, Sargeant received an honorary award at the Association des Journalists LGBTQI Cote D'or in Paris, France.

== General sources ==
- Armati, Lucas (June 2019). "Les gays se rebellent a Stonewall" (PDF). Causette. Paris: Causette Media.
- Bollinger, Alex (May 18, 2020). ""Harry Potter" author J.K. Rowling continues support for extreme anti-transgender rhetoric". LGBTQ Nation.
- Bongiovanni, Archie. (2022). The Stonewall Riots: Making a Stand for LGBTQ Rights. New York: First Second, Roaring Book Press. ISBN 978-1-250-16835-1.
- Carter, David. (2005). Stonewall: The Riots that Sparked the Gay Revolution. New York: St. Martin's Griffin. ISBN 978-0-3123-4269-2.
- Duberman, Martin. (1994). Stonewall. New York: Plume. ISBN 978-0-4522-7206-4.
- Fitzsimons, Tim (October 5, 2018). "LGBTQ History Month: The road to America's first gay pride march". NBC News.
- Fitzsimons, Tim (June 3, 2019). "#Pride 50: Fred Sargeant - Co-organizer of first NYC Pride March". NBC News.
- Kohler, Will (May 5, 2019). "Forgotten Gay Heroes - Craig Rodwell: The Father of PRIDE". Back2Stonewall.
- Library of Congress. "Library of Congress Catalog Record for The Stonewall Riots: coming out in the streets". LC Catalog.
- Lindholm, Jane (June 26, 2014). "Vermonter to be Honored at New York's Gay Pride Parade". Vermont Public Radio.
- PBS (2010). "Who was at Stonewall?". American Experience.
- Petter, Olivia (October 24, 2019). "LGB Alliance group faces criticism for being transphobic". The Independent.
- Pitts, Charles (1969). "Interview with Fred Sargeant on WBAI Radio". Fred Sargeant.
- Pitman, Gayle E.. (2019). The Stonewall Riots: Coming Out in the Streets. New York: Abrams Books for Young Readers. ISBN 978-1-4197-3720-6.
- Sanders, Kate (producer) (2011). Stonewall Uprising Interviews: Interview with Fred Sargeant (videotape). American Experience.
- Sargeant, Fred (June 22, 2010). "1970: A First-Person Account of the First Gay Pride March". The Village Voice. Archived from the original on June 23, 2017.
- Sargeant, Fred (June 25, 2009). "Anger Management". The New York Times.
- Sargeant, Fred (April 8, 2020). "8 April 2020".
- Swerling, Gabriella (October 23, 2019). "Trans dispute prompts new gay faction to break with Stonewall". The Telegraph.
