= Oscar Wilde Bookshop =

Book store in New York City

Coordinates: 40.7340°N 74.0006°W

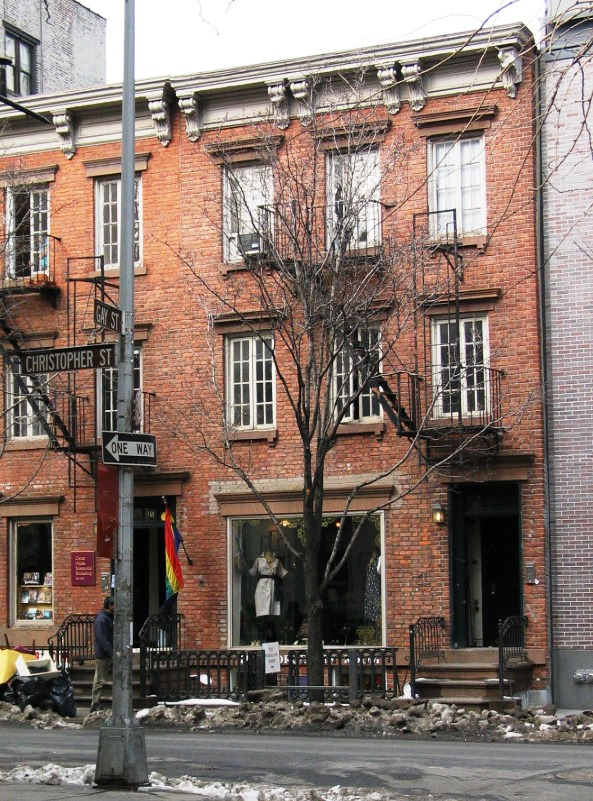
- Exterior view on Christopher Street in 2007
- Formerly: Oscar Wilde Memorial Bookshop
- Industry: LGBTQ bookstore
- Founded: November 24, 1967
- Founder: Craig Rodwell
- Defunct: March 29, 2009
- Fate: Closed
- Headquarters: 15 Christopher Street, New York, New York

The Oscar Wilde Bookshop was a bookstore located in New York City's Greenwich Village neighborhood that focused on LGBTQ works. It was founded by Craig Rodwell on November 24, 1967, as the Oscar Wilde Memorial Bookshop. Initially located at 291 Mercer Street, it moved in 1973 to 15 Christopher Street, opposite Gay Street.

The bookstore closed on March 29, 2009, citing the Great Recession and challenges from online bookstores.

In 2006, the bookshop received the Michele Karlsberg Leadership Award from the Publishing Triangle.

== History ==
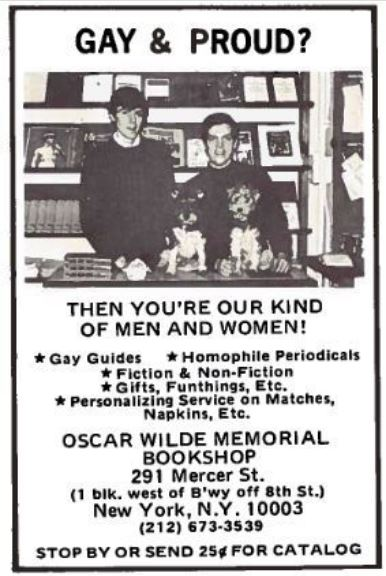
Advertisement for the Bookshop which ran in Queen's Quarterly magazine in 1968. Pictured are Fred Sargeant (l.) and Craig Rodwell (r.).

As a member and vice president of the Mattachine Society, Rodwell sought to make Mattachine more visible to gays and society at large by opening a storefront to cater to the growing local gay community in Greenwich Village, saying:

I was trying to get the (Mattachine) Society to be out dealing with the people instead of sitting in an office. We even looked at a few storefronts. I wanted the Society to set up a combination bookstore, counseling services, fund-raising headquarters, and office. The main thing was to be out on the street.

Rodwell did not consider himself to be a bookseller businessman but, rather, a person who at the age of 13 set out to help change the world's view of gay people and of gay people's own self-image.

The bookstore opened on November 24, 1967. Craig and his mother set up the store the night before the opening. Despite a limited selection of materials when the bookstore was first established, Rodwell refused to stock pornography and instead favored literature by gay and lesbian authors. On how he chose the shop's name, Rodwell said:

I wanted a name that would tell people what the shop was about. So I tried to think of the most prominent person whose name I could use who is most readily identifiable as a Homosexual by most people, someone who's sort of a pseudo-martyr. And Oscar Wilde was the most obvious at the time, so I called it the Oscar Wilde Memorial Bookshop.

In March 1968 Rodwell began publishing a monthly newsletter from the bookshop, calling it HYMNAL.

Early organizing meetings for the first Pride Parade in New York City were held at the bookshop in 1970.

Rodwell sold the bookshop in March 1993 to Bill Offenbaker, three months before Rodwell's death of stomach cancer. In June 1996 Offenbaker sold the store to Larry Lingle. In January 2003 Lingle announced that the bookshop would close due to financial difficulties. Deacon Maccubbin, owner of Lambda Rising bookstores, purchased it to prevent the historically significant bookstore from closing. The Advocate story on the scheduled closing failed to note that the founder of the Oscar Wilde Bookshop was Craig Rodwell, prompting a letter of correction from his former partner and first manager of the bookshop, Fred Sargeant. In 2006, the bookstore was purchased by one time manager, Kim Brinster.

The bookstore closed on March 29, 2009, due to double-digit declines in sales caused by the economic crisis amid extreme competition with online book sellers, according to Brinster. It was part of a spate of LGBT brick and mortar bookstores closures in the early 21st century, including Lambda Rising's Washington store and A Different Light in Los Angeles and San Francisco.

== Inspiration ==
Rodwell was brought up as a member of the Christian Science church. The roots of Rodwell's belief in "gay liberation" arose from his daily readings of Christian Science literature which stressed the dignity of every human being regardless of sexual identity.

Using the Christian Science example of community outreach and stressing the availability of literature that contained positive images of gays and lesbians, Rodwell modeled the Oscar Wilde Memorial Bookshop after Christian Science Reading Rooms.

== Bibliography ==
- Downs, Jim, Stand By Me: The Forgotten History of Gay Liberation (Basic, 2016)
- Duberman, Martin, Stonewall (New York: Dutton, 1993) ISBN 0-452-27206-8
- Marotta, Toby, The Politics of Homosexuality (Boston: Houghton Mifflin, 1981) ISBN 0-395-31338-4
- Sargeant, Fred (2009) Anger Management, New York Times Op-Ed, June 25, 2009 Retrieved January 3, 2011
