= Alan Sears (sociologist) =

Canadian sociologist

- Born: 1956 (age 68–69)
- Education: BA (Carleton), MA (Carleton), PhD (Warwick, Sociology)
- Scientific career
- Fields: sociology
- Institutions: Toronto Metropolitan University, University of Windsor
- Thesis: The health of nations : public health and the social reproduction of the working class in Canada and Britain 1900-20 (1988)
- Doctoral advisor: Simon Clarke

Alan Sears is a Canadian sociologist and Professor Emeritus of Sociology at Toronto Metropolitan University. Previously he taught at the University of Windsor. Sears is known for his work on sexuality, education and social movements.

== Books ==
- Sears, A. 2025. Eros and Alienation: Capitalism and the Making of Gendered Sexualities. London: Pluto Press.
- Sears, A. and J. Cairns. 2015. A Good Book in Theory: Making Sense through Inquiry (3rd ed.). Toronto: University of Toronto Press.
- Sears, A. 2014. The Next New Left: A History of the Future. Winnipeg: Fernwood Press.
- Cairns, J. and A. Sears. 2012. The Democratic Imagination: Envisioning Popular Power in the Twenty-First Century. Toronto: University of Toronto Press
- Sears, A. 2003. Retooling the Mind Factory: Education in a Lean State. Toronto: University of Toronto Press.
