= 1960s in LGBTQ rights =

This is a list of notable events in the history of LGBTQ rights that took place in the 1960s.

== Events during this period ==
=== 1960 ===
- January 20 – The United States Court of Federal Claims overturns the Other Than Honorable discharge issued by the United States Air Force to Fannie Mae Clackum for her alleged homosexuality. This is the first known instance of a homosexuality-related discharge being successfully fought, although the case turned on due process issues and did not affect the military's policy of excluding homosexuals from service. This was an amazing relief to those who were homosexual.
- June – The National Assembly of France passes the Mirguet Amendment, which declares homosexuality, along with alcoholism and prostitution, a "social scourge" and urges the government to take action against it.

=== 1961 ===
- March 20 – The United States Supreme Court denies certiorari to Frank Kameny's petition to review the legality of his firing by the United States Army's Map Service in 1957, bringing his four-year legal battle to a close.
- July 28- Illinois Governor Otto Kerner (D) signs Laws of Illinois 1961, a set of revisions to the state's legal code which include repeal of Illinois' sodomy law.
- September 11 – KQED in San Francisco broadcasts The Rejected, the first made-for-television documentary about homosexuality on American television.
- November 7 – José Sarria, the first known openly gay candidate for political office in the world, shocks political observers by garnering nearly 6,000 votes in his bid for a seat on the San Francisco Board of Supervisors. This feat marked the beginning of the notion that gays could represent a powerful voting bloc.
- November 15 — After three months of preliminary meetings, Frank Kameny and Jack Nichols formally found the Mattachine Society of Washington, D.C.
- August 5- A large bar fight between 14-19 homophobic men went into a gay bar on a dare, they were met with many homosexuals ready to fight. This became known as the Black Nite Brawl.

=== 1962 ===
- After a "gayola" scandal in which police officers demanded payoffs from gay bar owners, officer Elliott Blackstone is designated by San Francisco Police Department as the department's first liaison officer to the "homophile community", a position which is today replicated in various police departments as an LGBT liaison officer and an early example of community policing.
- The first LGBTQ business association, the Tavern Guild, is formed by gay bar owners in San Francisco.
- January 1 – Illinois' new criminal code goes into effect, making it the first state in the United States to strike down sodomy laws.
- June 25 – The United States Supreme Court rules in MANual Enterprises v. Day that photographs of nude or semi-nude men designed to appeal to homosexuals are not obscene and may be sent through the mail.

=== 1963 ===
- January – East Coast Homophile Organizations (ECHO) is established in Philadelphia; initial members include the regional chapters of Daughters of Bilitis, Janus Society, and Mattachine Society.
- October 30 – Following a 15-year campaign to close it down, the California Department of Alcoholic Beverage Control revokes the liquor license of the Black Cat Bar, a focus of early gay activism in the San Francisco Bay Area.

=== 1964 ===
- February – The Black Cat Bar, having struggled for several months to survive without liquor sales, closes permanently.
- April 25 – The Fun Lounge police raid near Chicago resulted in 109 arrests and led to the creation of Mattachine Midwest, a gay rights organization modeled after the Mattachine Society.
- September 19 – A small group pickets the Whitehall Street Induction Center in New York City after the confidentiality of gay men's draft records was violated. This action has been identified as the first gay rights demonstration in the United States.
- December 2 – Four gay men and lesbians picket a New York City lecture by a psychoanalyst espousing the model of homosexuality as a mental illness. The demonstrators are given ten minutes to make a rebuttal.

=== 1965 ===
- January 1 – San Francisco police arrest gay and lesbian party-goers at a fund-raising ball for the Council on Religion and the Homosexual, held at California Hall, an event which galvanizes the local gay and lesbian community.
- April 17 – Ten gay and lesbian demonstrators picket the White House in Washington, D.C., the first in a series of demonstrations staged this year by the East Coast Homophile Organization (ECHO).
- April 18 – Twenty-nine ECHO demonstrators picket the United Nations in New York City.
- April 25 – An estimated 150 people participate in a sit-in when the manager of Dewey's restaurant in Philadelphia, Pennsylvania, refused service to several people he thought looked gay. Four people are arrested, including homophile rights leader Clark Polak of Philadelphia's Janus Society. All four are convicted of disorderly conduct. Members of the society also leaflet outside the restaurant the following week and negotiate with the owners to bring an end to the denial of service.
- May 29 – Ten men and three women participate in an ECHO picket of the White House.
- June 16 — The United States Court of Appeals for the District of Columbia Circuit rules in Scott v. Macy that the United States Civil Service Commission "may not rely on a determination of 'immoral conduct' based only on such vague labels as 'homosexual' and 'homosexual conduct' as a ground" for disqualifying applicants for federal employment.
- July 4 – ECHO pickets Independence Hall in Philadelphia on Independence Day. This is the first in a series of actions, called the Annual Reminder, held each July 4 through 1969.
- September 26 – Thirty people picket Grace Cathedral to protest punitive actions taken against Rev. Canon Robert Cromey for his involvement in the Council on Religion and the Homosexual, an alliance between LGBT people and religious leaders.
- October 23 – Thirty-five ECHO demonstrators picket the White House. The last White House picket; demonstrators felt, with this event, that picketing the White House had lost its effectiveness as a tactic.

=== 1966 ===
- January – The South African Police raid a gay party attended by about 300 people in Forest Town, a suburb of Johannesburg. This attracts much public and political attention, leading in 1969 to an extension of the criminalization of male homosexuality.
- January 21 – Time magazine publishes an unsigned two-page article, "The Homosexual in America". The article includes statements such as "Homosexuality is a pathetic little second-rate substitute for reality, a pitiable flight from life. ... it deserves no encouragement ... no pretense that it is anything but a pernicious sickness."
- February 18 – The first meeting of the coalition of gay rights groups that will become the North American Conference of Homophile Organizations takes place in Kansas City, Missouri.
- April 21 – Activists stage a "sip-in" at Julius, a bar in New York City, challenging a state Liquor Authority regulation prohibiting serving alcohol to homosexuals on the basis that they are disorderly. Although the resultant complaint to the Liquor Authority results in no action, the city's human rights commission declares that such discrimination could not continue.
- May 21 – A coalition of homophile organizations across the country organizes simultaneous demonstrations for Armed Forces Day. The Los Angeles group holds a 15-car motorcade (which has been identified as the nation's first gay pride parade) and activists hold pickets in the other cities.
- July 18 – Approximately 25 people picket Compton's Cafeteria in San Francisco when new management begins using Pinkerton agents and police to harass gay and transgender customers.
- August – Gay and transgender customers riot at Compton's in response to continued police harassment. The restaurant and the surrounding neighborhood sustain heavy damage. The following night demonstrators throw up another picket line, which quickly descends into new violence and damage to the restaurant.
- September – Mattachine Midwest pickets the Chicago Tribune and the Chicago Sun-Times for routinely ignoring press material and refusing advertising from the organization.

=== 1967 ===
- The book Homosexual Behavior Among Males: A Cross-Cultural and Cross-Species Investigation by Wainwright Churchill III breaks ground as a scientific study approaching homosexuality as a fact of life rather than as a sin, crime or disease, and introduces the term "homoerotophobia", a possible precursor to "homophobia".
- Pierre Trudeau, then Canada's Minister of Justice, introduces an Omnibus Bill to overhaul Canada's criminal laws, which includes decriminalizing homosexual acts. Trudeau tells reporters, "There's no place for the state in the bedrooms of the nation" and "What's done in private between two consenting adults doesn't concern the Criminal Code." After 18 months of debate, the bill becomes law in 1969.
- January 1 – In the first hour of the new year, a raid occurs at the Black Cat Tavern in the Silverlake area near Los Angeles. Several hundred people spontaneously demonstrate on Sunset Boulevard and picket outside the Black Cat, fueling the formation of gay rights groups in California.
- January 16 – The Louisiana Supreme Court rules that the state's statutory ban on "unnatural carnal copulation" applies to women engaged in oral sex with other women.
- February 11 – In a follow-up action to the Black Cat demonstration, around 40 picketers demonstrate in front of the Black Cat in coordination with hippies and other counterculture groups who had been targeted by police for harassment and violence.
- March 7 – CBS airs "The Homosexuals", an episode of CBS Reports. This first-ever national television broadcast on the subject of homosexuality has been described as "the single most destructive hour of antigay propaganda in our nation's history."
- April 23 – The Student Homophile League of Columbia University pickets and disrupts a panel of psychiatrists discussing homosexuality.
- July 27 – The Sexual Offences Act 1967 receives royal assent from Elizabeth II, decriminalizing private homosexual acts in England and Wales. The age of consent for homosexual acts is set at 21, compared to 16 for heterosexual acts.
- August – Following the arrest of two patrons at the Los Angeles gay bar The Patch, owner Lee Glaze organizes the other patrons to move on the police station. After buying out a nearby flower shop, the demonstrators caravan to the station, festoon it with the flowers and bail out the arrested men.
- November 24 – Craig Rodwell opens the first bookstore devoted to gay and lesbian authors in the United States, the Oscar Wilde Memorial Bookshop.

=== 1968 ===
- Paragraph 175 is eased in East Germany.
- May 9 – About 200 students at Bucks County Community College protested the college's cancelation of a speech by gay rights activist Dick Leitsch.
- July 17 – The Wall Street Journal publishes an article entitled, "U.S. Homosexuals Gain in Trying to Persuade Society to Accept Them".

=== 1969 ===
- Paragraph 175 eased in West Germany.
- Paul Goodman publishes "The Politics of Being Queer".
- March – California state assemblyman Willie Brown starts an annual tradition of introducing legislation to repeal the state's sodomy law. He would finally succeed in 1975.
- April – When gay activist and journalist Gale Whittington is fired by the States Steamship Company after coming out in print, a small group of activists operating under the name "Committee for Homosexual Freedom" (CHF) pickets the company's San Francisco offices every workday between noon and 1:00 for several weeks.
- May 14 – Canada decriminalizes homosexual acts between consenting adults with the passage of the Criminal Law Amendment Act, 1968-69.
- May 18 – Fight Repression of Erotic Expression (FREE), later to be called the Queer Student Cultural Center, is formed at the University of Minnesota in the United States. It is the first gay and lesbian organization in the state, and is one of the first gay and lesbian college student-led groups in the country, the first being the Student Homophile League at Columbia, founded in 1967.
- May 21 – The Committee for Homosexual Freedom pickets a Tower Records store for several weeks following the firing of an employee believed to be gay. The employee is re-hired.
- May 21 – In South Africa, the Immorality Amendment Act, 1969 introduces Section 20A, the infamous "men at a party" clause, which criminalised all sexual acts committed between men "at a party", where "party" is defined as any occasion where more than two people are present. The amendment also raised the age of consent for male homosexual activity from 16 to 19, although "sodomy" and "unnatural acts" were already criminal.
- June 28 – The Stonewall riots in New York City mark the start of the modern gay rights movement. Rioting breaks out sporadically over the next several days.
- July 1
  - Stonewall becomes center for gathering LGBTQ+ advocates.
  - In Norton v. Macy, the United States Court of Appeals for the District of Columbia Circuit rules that the termination of a National Aeronautics and Space Administration employee for "immoral conduct" relating to his alleged homosexual conduct was unlawful.
- July 2 - A demonstration is held outside the Greenwich Village offices of The Village Voice newspaper, in protest of their seemingly condescending and homophobic account of the riots.
- July 4 - The final ECHO-organized Annual Reminder is held in Philadelphia.
- July 8 - Connecticut Governor John Dempsey (D) signs into law a set of revisions to the state penal code, one of which is a repeal of the state's sodomy law. The revisions are scheduled to enter into effect on October 1, 1971.
- July 9 - The Mattachine Society of New York hosts a "Homosexual Liberation Meeting" at the Freedom House in Midtown Manhattan. Over 100 attend.
- July 16 - The Mattachine Society of New York hosts another organizing meeting, which over 200 attend. During the course of the meeting, approximately 40 participants walk out in dissatisfaction over chapter president Dick Leitsch's handling of the post-Stonewall political energy.
- July 24 – The Gay Liberation Front (GLF), a radical leftist group addressing not only gay rights but other left-wing causes, forms in New York City. Over the next few years dozens of local GLF chapters would form across the country.
- August – Canada decriminalizes consensual sex between adults.
- August 5 – The Lonesome Cowboys police raid in Atlanta occurs.
- October 31
  - Sixty members of the Gay Liberation Front (GLF) and the Committee for Homosexual Freedom (CHF) staged a protest outside the offices of the San Francisco Examiner in response to a series of news articles disparaging LGBT people in San Francisco's gay bars and clubs. Examiner employees dumped a bag of printers' ink from the third story window of the newspaper building onto the crowd. The protestors then used the ink to stamp purple hand prints as well as scrawling "Gay Power" and other slogans on the side of the building.
  - Time magazine runs a cover story entitled, "The Homosexual: Newly Visible, Newly Understood". The author, Christopher Cory, presented a "case for greater tolerance of homosexuals" yet "emphasized the effeminate side of homosexuality to the exclusion of everyone else," resulting in a protest at the Time-Life Building on November 12, 1969.
- November 2 - The Eastern Regional Conference of Homophile Organizations votes at its convention to abandon the Annual Reminder demonstration in Philadelphia in favor of an event to commemorate the Stonewall Riots. This proposed event would eventually blossom into the first Christopher Street Liberation Day, held on June 28, 1970.
- December 21 – Ten to fifteen members of the New York City chapter of Gay Liberation Front break away to form Gay Activists Alliance to focus exclusively on gay rights issues.
- December 28 – The Los Angeles chapter of Gay Liberation Front announces plans to establish Stonewall Nation, the world's first legally recognized gay village, by moving several hundred gay people to Alpine County, California, recalling the county government and electing an all-gay slate. After a brief flurry of national attention, GLF announces that the plan is off.

== See also ==
- Timeline of LGBT history – timeline of events from 12,000 BCE to present
- LGBT rights by country or territory – current legal status around the world
- LGBT social movements
