= List of LGBTQ actions in the United States prior to the Stonewall riots =

Although the Stonewall riots (also called the Stonewall uprising) on June 28, 1969, are generally considered the impetus of the modern gay liberation movement, a number of demonstrations of civil resistance took place prior to that date. These actions, often organized by local homophile organizations but sometimes spontaneous, addressed concerns ranging from anti-gay discrimination in employment and public accommodations to the exclusion of homosexuals from the United States military to police harassment to the treatment of homosexuals in revolutionary Cuba. The early actions have been credited with preparing the gay community for Stonewall and contributing to the riots' symbolic power.

A common technique of early activists was the picket line, especially for those actions organized by such Eastern groups as the Mattachine Society of New York, the Mattachine Society of Washington, Philadelphia's Janus Society, and the New York chapter of Daughters of Bilitis; these groups acted under the collective name East Coast Homophile Organizations (ECHO). Organized pickets tended to be in large urban population centers because these centers were where the largest concentration of homophile activists were located. Picketers at ECHO-organized events were required to follow strict dress codes: men wore ties, preferably with a jacket, and women wore skirts. Because a common focus of was employment discrimination, Mattachine Society of Washington founder Frank Kameny wanted to portray homosexuals as "presentable and 'employable'". Many of the participants in these early actions went on to become deeply involved in the gay liberation movement.

== Actions ==
Date	Location	Reason	Description
October 1955	Baltimore	Resisting police harassment	In 1955, 162 gay men and lesbians were arrested on charges of disorderly conduct after a police raid at the Pepper Hill Club on North Gay Street. Newspapers report that 26 year old Dorothy U. Killman was fined on two charges of assaulting policemen who, "...tried to load her into a paddy wagon."
May 1959	Los Angeles	Resisting police harassment	Transgender women, drag queens, lesbians, and gay men clashed with police at Cooper Do-nuts, a hang-out for them and street hustlers who were frequently harassed by the Los Angeles Police Department (LAPD). Police arrested three people, including John Rechy, but other patrons began pelting the police with donuts and coffee cups. The LAPD called for back-up and arrested a number of rioters. Rechy and the other two original detainees were able to escape.
August 5, 1961	Milwaukee	Self-defense against gay-bashing	When four Navy servicemen jumped the bouncer at Milwaukee's Black Nite gay bar, drag performer Josie Carter used beer bottles to fight off the men attacking her husband, sending two to the hospital. The remaining Navy servicemen left to round up additional servicemen and returned to the bar for revenge. They were met with a counterattack of more than 70 LGBTQ patrons who fought back in what became known as the Black Nite Brawl. The interior of the bar was largely destroyed and three people were hospitalized. Milwaukee police, who had beaten a gay man to death during a park raid only a year earlier, arrested the attackers and did not arrest bar patrons.
September 19, 1964	New York City	Protesting discrimination in the US military	Organized by activist Randy Wicker, a small group picketed the Whitehall Street Induction Center after the confidentiality of gay men's draft records was violated. This action has been identified as the first gay rights demonstration in the United States.
December 2, 1964	New York City	Protesting the disease model of homosexuality	Four gay men and lesbians picketed a lecture by a psychoanalyst espousing the model of homosexuality as a mental illness. The demonstrators were given ten minutes to make a rebuttal.
January 1, 1965	San Francisco	Resisting police suppression	The Council on Religion and the Homosexual held a costume party at California Hall on Polk Street in San Francisco to raise money for the new organization. When the ministers informed the San Francisco Police Department of the event, the SFPD attempted to force the rented hall's owners to cancel it. At the event itself, some of the ministers and ticket takers were arrested, creating a brief riot.
April 17, and April 18, 1965	Washington, D.C., New York City	Protesting Cuba's persecution of homosexuals	Homophile activists picketed the White House on April 17 and the United Nations on the 18th after learning that Cuba was placing homosexuals in forced labor camps.
April 25, 1965	Philadelphia	Protesting business discrimination	An estimated 150 people participated in a sit-in when the manager of Dewey's restaurant refused service to "a large number of homosexuals and people wearing non-conformist clothing." Four people were arrested, including homophile rights leader Clark Polak of Philadelphia's Janus Society. All four were convicted of disorderly conduct. Members of the society also leafleted outside the restaurant the following week and negotiated with the owners to bring an end to the denial of service. Three people staged another sit-in on May 5, occupying a table for a few hours. The police were also called for this sit-in, but left after taking no action, Polak was quoted saying, "we could stay in there as long as we wanted as the police had no authority to ask us to leave."
May 29, 1965	Washington, D.C.	Demanding equal treatment	Organized by ECHO, seven men and three women picketed the White House. The first of a series of pickets held throughout the summer, which also targeted the Civil Service Commission, the State Department and The Pentagon.
July 4, 1965	Philadelphia	Demanding equal treatment	Organized by ECHO, demonstrators picketed at Independence Hall. Picketers returned each year through 1969 for what came to be known as the Annual Reminder beginning a new era in Philadelphia LGBT culture as a presence in the community.
September 26, 1965	San Francisco	Supporting a pro-gay clergyman	Thirty people picketed Grace Cathedral to protest punitive actions taken against Rev. Canon Robert Cromey for his involvement in the Council on Religion and the Homosexual, an alliance between LGBT people and religious leaders.
October 23, 1965	Washington, D.C.	Demanding equal treatment	The last White House picket. Demonstrators felt, with this event, that picketing the White House had lost its effectiveness as a tactic.
April 21, 1966	New York City	Challenging a discriminatory bar regulation	Activists Dick Leitsch, Craig Rodwell and John Timmons were seeking a test case to challenge New York's regulation barring known homosexuals from being served alcohol in bars and restaurants. They invited reporters to follow the "sip-in" as they sought refusal of service. After being served in three bars despite announcing their homosexuality, the group was finally refused service at Julius', a gay bar that had been raided ten days prior. Although Leitsch's complaint to the State Liquor Authority resulted in no action, the city's human rights commission declared that such discrimination could not continue.
May 21, 1966	Los Angeles, New York City, Philadelphia, San Francisco, Washington, D.C.	Protesting exclusion of homosexuals from the United States armed forces	A coalition of homophile organizations across the country organized simultaneous demonstrations for Armed Forces Day. The Los Angeles group held a 15-car motorcade (which has been identified as the nation's first gay pride parade) and activists held pickets in the other cities. The protest grew out of the first meeting of the organization that would become the North American Conference of Homophile Organizations.
July 18, 1966	San Francisco	Protesting business discrimination	Around 25 people picketed Compton's Cafeteria when new management began using Pinkerton agents and police to harass gay and transgender customers.
August 1966	San Francisco	Protesting police harassment	Gay and transgender customers rioted at Compton's in response to continued police harassment. The restaurant and the surrounding neighborhood sustained heavy damage. The following night demonstrators threw up another picket line, which quickly descended into new violence and damage to the restaurant.
September 1966	Chicago	Protesting press censorship	Mattachine Midwest picketed the Chicago Tribune and the Chicago Sun-Times for routinely ignoring press material and refusing advertising from the organization. Sun-Times columnist Irv Kupcinet mentioned the pickets in his column but neglected to mention that his paper was one of the targets. The Tribune gave the event no coverage.
January 1, 1967	Los Angeles	Resisting a police raid	The LAPD raided the New Year's Eve parties at two gay bars, the Black Cat Tavern and New Faces. Several patrons were injured and a bartender was hospitalized with a fractured skull. Several hundred people spontaneously demonstrated on Sunset Boulevard and picketed outside the Black Cat.
February 11, 1967	Los Angeles	Protesting police raids	Organized by the owner of gay bar Pandora's Box and built on the Black Cat protests of weeks earlier, about 200 LGBT people watched as around 40 picketers demonstrated in front of the Black Cat in coordination with hippies and other counterculture groups who had been targeted by police for harassment and violence.
March 17, 1968	Los Angeles	Challenging police harassment and sting operations	Two drag queens known as "The Princess" and "The Duchess" held a St. Patrick's Day party at Griffith Park, a popular cruising spot and a frequent target of police activity. More than 200 gay men socialized through the day.
April 23, 1968	New York City	Protesting the disease model of homosexuality	The Student Homophile League of Columbia University picketed and disrupted a panel of psychiatrists discussing homosexuality.
May 9, 1968	Newtown, Pennsylvania	Protesting censorship	A talk at Bucks County Community College by Dick Leitsch, president of the Mattachine Society of New York, was cancelled by college president Charles E. Rollins. Approximately two hundred students protested in response.
May 30, 1968	Los Angeles	Challenging police harassment	Homophile groups organized a "gay-in" in Griffith Park.
August 1968	Los Angeles	Protesting a police raid	Following the arrest of two patrons, The Patch owner Lee Glaze organized the other patrons to move on the police station. After buying out a nearby flower shop, the demonstrators caravanned to the station, festooned it with the flowers and bailed out the arrested men.
April 1969	San Francisco	Protesting employer discrimination	When gay activist and journalist Gale Whittington was fired by the States Steamship Company after coming out in print, a small group of activists operating under the name "Committee for Homosexual Freedom" (CHF) picketed the company's San Francisco offices every workday between noon and 1:00 for several weeks.
May 1969	San Francisco	Protesting employer discrimination	Tower Records fired Frank Denaro, believing him to be gay. The Committee for Homosexual Freedom picketed the store for several weeks until Denaro was reinstated. The CHF ran similar pickets of Safeway stores, Macy's and the Federal Building.

== See also ==
- List of LGBT rights organizations
- Timeline of LGBT history
