= 1968 Bucks County Community College protest =

1968 gay rights protest in Newtown, Bucks County, Pennsylvania

On May 9, 1968, a group of up to 200 students at Bucks County Community College in Newtown, Bucks County, Pennsylvania, protested the cancelation by the college president of a planned speech by gay rights activist Dick Leitsch scheduled at the campus later that day. The protest, which was largely peaceful and lasted several hours on the campus, is considered one of only about 30 known gay rights protests in the United States prior to the 1969 Stonewall riots.

In 1968, Ralph Sassi Jr., the president of the college's student government, approved a request from a cultural affairs committee on campus to host a presentation by Leitsch, who was the president of the Mattachine Society chapter in New York City and had received some media attention for challenging that city's ban on bars serving gay patrons. The presentation would focus on the way that gay people were treated by the criminal justice and law enforcement systems. Sassi, likely as with most of the student body, was unfamiliar with Leitsch, but saw no reason to not approve the presentation and felt the students would be interested in a discussion on the topic. He approved the committee's request and allocated $450 (equivalent to $4,069 in 2024) collected from student activity fees to cover Leitsch's speaking fee. After news of the planned speech became public, the college president received about 100 complaints, and anti-gay protestors picketed outside the college. On May 9, just three hours before the planned speech, College President Charles Rollins canceled the event.

Following the cancelation, about 200 students conducted a walkout and began protesting. Sassi was present, criticizing the cancelation as a violation of free speech while urging the protestors to remain peaceful. Rollins, accompanied by security, spoke to the crowd, telling them that outside pressure had led to his decision to cancel the event, as he did not want to damage the college's relationship with the surrounding community. As a replacement, Rollins organized a panel discussion on the topic of homosexuality with several faculty members, which attracted about 50 students. The main protesting lasted a few hours and was followed by some smaller protesting later that day off campus. Plans were made to have Leitsch deliver his lecture at an off-campus site, but these ultimately did not come to fruition, and the controversy soon died down.

Despite extensive coverage in local media, the event was largely forgotten until 2020 when LGBTQ historian Marc Stein discovered a 1968 article in The Philadelphia Inquirer mentioning it. It was considered significant to historians as one of only a few gay rights protests prior to Stonewall, and only one of two that occurred on a college campus. Additionally, unlike other protests from the time, this one was largely organized by protestors who would have likely been straight. As part of his research, Stein published an extensive article in OutHistory and hosted a forum at the college on the 54th anniversary of the event. Today, the college and county are considered more amicable to LGBTQ individuals than during the protest, with the college having a gay–straight alliance and the county hosting a sizable LGBTQ community.

== Background ==
Bucks County Community College is a two-year community college that was established in the mid-1960s with a campus in Newtown, Bucks County, Pennsylvania. Charles Rollins was the founding president of the college and was still serving in that position by early 1968. At that same time, Ralph Sassi Jr., a 20-year-old native of Levittown, Pennsylvania, who was about to graduate from the college with an associate of arts degree, was serving as the president of the student government. In this role, Sassi was responsible for the allocation of money collected from student activity fees—$15 (equivalent to $136 in 2024) collected annually from every student—to different groups on campus. At the time, the college had an enrollment of about 1,200 students.

=== Proposed speech ===
While president, Sassi received a request from a cultural affairs committee, which had recently been formed on campus, to pay for Dick Leitsch, a gay rights activist from New York City, to host a lecture on campus. Leitsch was the president of the New York City chapter of the Mattachine Society, a nationwide gay rights organization, during the homophile movement. He had recently received some media coverage for directly challenging the city's ban on bars serving alcohol to gay patrons. According to contemporary reports from the community college's student newspaper, the committee recommended Leitsch following the results of a questionnaire submitted to the student body asking them for topics they wished to hear more about. Leitsch would be the cultural affairs committee's first guest speaker since the group's founding.

Sassi was unfamiliar with Leitsch, and a 2021 article in The Philadelphia Inquirer stated that much of the student body would have probably also been unfamiliar with the man and his work. Sassi felt that his presentation, "The Problems of the Homosexual in Our Society", which would include the speaker advocating for better treatment of gay people by the criminal justice system and law enforcement officers in particular, would be of interest to the students. Speaking later of the request, Sassi said, "I felt that my job was to represent all of the needs of the students, from whatever was needed to learn and to broaden the educational experience. I didn't think anything of having this speaker come." He approved the committee's request, allocating $450 ($4,069 in 2024) to pay for Leitsch's speaking fee, with the event scheduled for May 9.

=== Backlash and cancelation ===
The day after Sassi approved funding for the speech, the Dean of Student Affairs called him into the office and asked why he had approved the committee's request. Sassi defended his decision by saying that it would allow the students to hear from perspectives they probably would not have otherwise heard from, saying later of his decision, "I wanted to hear it from an educational point of view. We were a new college. I thought at college we should expand our horizons. I didn't figure in the political community in Bucks County and Pennsylvania. I didn’t factor that in at all." After news of the planned speech was made public, the community college received about 100 complaints. Additionally, some anti-gay protestors picketed outside of the college's gates. Due to the backlash, on May 9, only three hours before the speech was set to commence, President Rollins announced that the college administration was cancelling the event.

== Protest ==
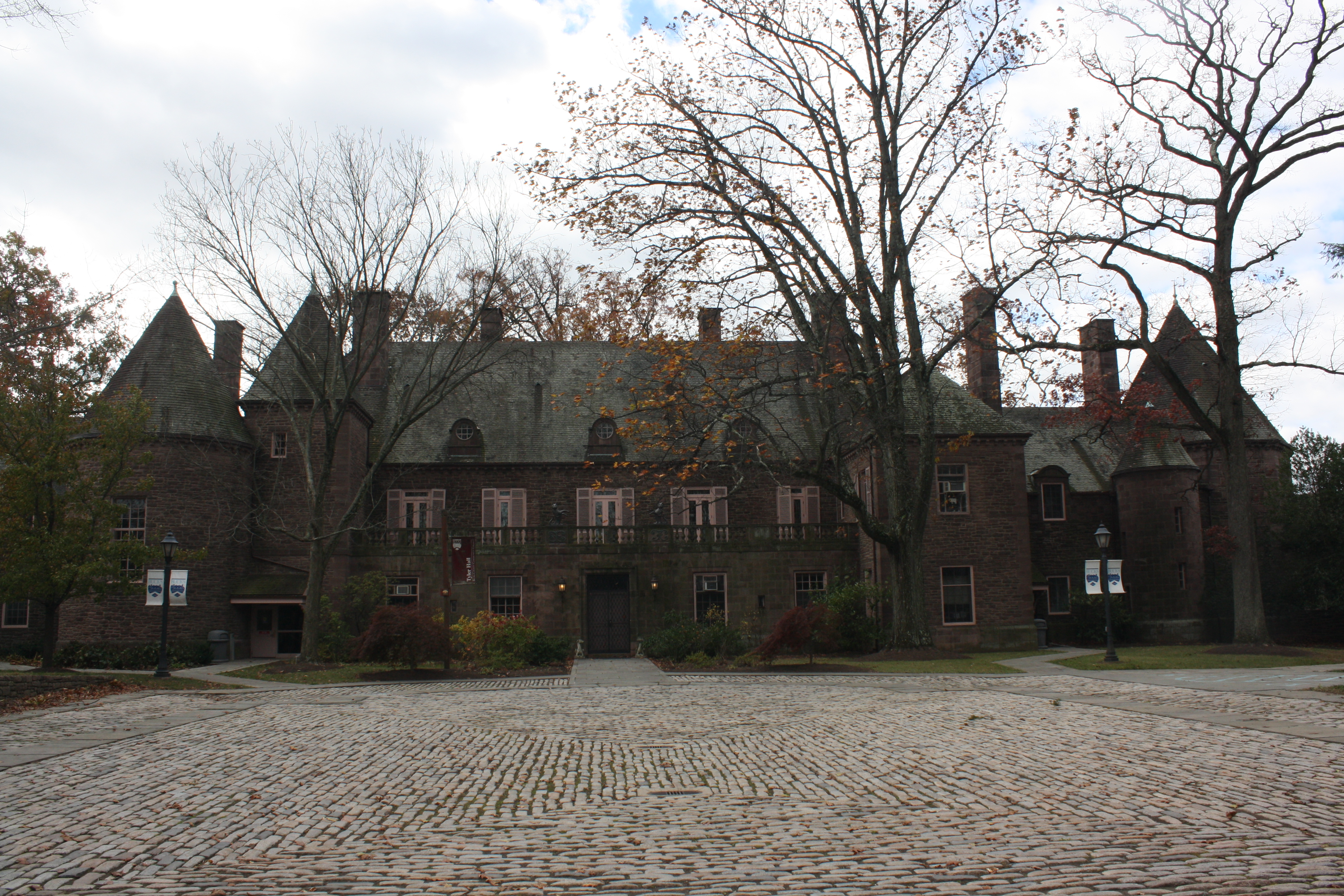
The protest took place outside of Tyler Hall (pictured 2012).

After students learned of the cancellation, some moved quickly through campus, spreading the word to others about their plans to protest the administration's decision. A walkout began, and within two hours of Rollins's announcement, a large group of students had amassed outside of Tyler Hall. In total, up to 200 students participated in the protest, equivalent to about a sixth of the total student body. Sassi, who had never participated in a protest before, publicly spoke to the crowd, calling the president's decision to cancel the speech unfair while urging the protestors to remain civil and peaceful. Regarding his participation in the protest, Sassi stated that his main concern was over free speech and the college's censorship of the students. In a 2022 article in the Bucks County Courier Times, he said, "To me it was a right of free speech, the right to speak up, the right to listen and make decisions on our own. It was a major disappointment at the community college that we weren’t afforded that opportunity." Sassi also mentioned that, while Leitsch's sexuality was the basis for the decision to cancel the speech, student protesters were largely upset by the perception that they lacked the maturity to engage with such culturally controversial topics that would be discussed in the lecture.

Rollins, who was accompanied by security guards, made an appearance during the protest and addressed the crowd, saying that it had been his decision to cancel the speech. During his discussion, he admitted that his decision had been influenced by outside voices, including clergy members and the parents of several students, who had reached out to him about the speech. He justified this in part by stressing the community college's close relationship to the local community, highlighting the fact that local taxes paid for about a third of the overall cost of tuition for students. As a substitute, Rollins stated that a public discussion covering the same topic would he held later that day, featuring faculty members from the college's philosophy, psychology, and sociology departments. Additionally, Rollins fielded questions from some of the student protestors. In total, the protest lasted a few hours. Local media reported at the time that the protesting was largely peaceful.

== Later activities ==
The replacement discussion featuring the college faculty members was conducted later that day with an audience of about 50 students present. During the discussion, several biology professors called homosexuality "abnormal", with one claiming that he had information from a medical doctor that homosexual acts led to "physical as well as psychological damage". Also later that day, two smaller protests occurred at off-campus locations. One student offered to host Leitsch at her home, and while 60 students showed up to hear his presentation, Leitsch was ultimately unable to participate, as he had been in a car accident. At the time that Leitsch notified them of the cancellation, it is likely that he was unaware that the initial program had been canceled.

A day after the protesting, student leaders met with the dean of students to discuss the cancelation, with the dean reiterating that the primary reason had been community pressure, with some in Bucks County mistakenly believing that money collected from their taxes would be used to pay Leitsch's speaking fee. During the meeting, Sassi also noted that there had been a rumor on campus that some professors were going to fail students who attended the lecture, which the dean claimed was most likely an exaggeration, but not entirely unbelievable. Hoping to still have Leitsch speak to the student body, organizers initially made plans to invite him to an off-campus speech on May 21. Student leaders eventually decided against it, believing it would occur just before final exams and graduation. Although further plans to invite Leitsch were discussed, nothing came of them, and it remains unclear whether the $450, already paid before the cancellation, was ever refunded.

The controversy over the planned speech was discussed over the next several days in meetings of both the county commission and the college's board of trustees. To help prevent further controversies, the college created a committee, composed of three faculty members, three administrators, and three students, to draft policies regarding future speakers. While the controversy died down over the next several days, Sassi received an anonymous postcard about three weeks later that contained homophobic and threatening remarks towards him.

== Legacy ==
=== Rediscovery ===
The protest received extensive coverage in the local media at the time, including a mention in The Philadelphia Inquirer. Over time, the event largely faded from memory, and by the 2020s, the event was largely unknown, even among LGBTQ historians. In 2020, Marc Stein, a history professor at San Francisco State University who has researched the LGBTQ history of Philadelphia, stumbled upon The Philadelphia Inquirer article discussing the protest. Stein reached out to Monica Kuna, the librarian of Bucks County Community College, asking for more information on the event, with the librarian discovering that the student newspaper, the County Collegian, had run several articles covering the protest and later activities. As part of his research, Stein also reached out to Sassi, who shared some of his personal recollections about the incident. In 2021, Stein published his findings in an article for OutHistory, and the following year, he helped to produce a traveling exhibit for the Pennsylvania LGBT History Network on LGBTQ history on Pennsylvania colleges that included discussion of the Bucks County protest.

Concerning the forgotten history of the event, Stein attributes it to the fact that, while it was covered extensively by local media outlets, it did not become a national story. According to Bob Skiba, a curator at the William Way LGBT Community Center in Philadelphia, media coverage of LGBTQ activism up until the late 1960s tended to be limited or nonexistent, noting that the 1965 Dewey's sit-ins received very little coverage. Additionally, Stein said that the protest was not covered by LGBTQ publications in part because it had not been conducted by activists within the community, meaning that they "could not take credit for the demonstration". Further, Stein stated that a great deal of LGBTQ history as it pertains to places of post-secondary education often focus on larger and more prestigious universities, with community colleges typically being overlooked.

=== Significance ===
The protest occurred about 13 months before the Stonewall riots, which The Philadelphia Inquirer credits as "launch[ing] the modern LGBTQ rights movement and eclips[ing] most of the pathbreaking events and organizations that preceded it." Multiple sources have called the Bucks County protest one of the largest gay rights protest pre-Stonewall. Per Stein, the protest in Bucks County is one of only about 30 confirmed gay rights protests to take place in the United States prior to the Stonewall riots, which he said are considered the "Holy Grail" to LGBTQ historians due to their rarity. Additionally, the Bucks County incident is one of only two known gay rights protests in the pre-Stonewall era to occur on a college campus, following an earlier protest at Columbia University. Most college activism pertaining to LGBTQ rights did not occur until after the Stonewall riots, and even then, it mainly occurred at colleges in urban areas, such as Temple University and the University of Pennsylvania in Philadelphia.

According to Stein, the protest is also notable in that it was organized largely by white, middle-class, heterosexual individuals, as opposed to other protests from around the same time that were largely the work of activists within the gay community. He notes that this may be evidence of increased acceptance for discussion of LGBTQ topics among college students in the 1960s, which can be viewed as a prelude to the increased LGBTQ activism seen on college campuses in the 1970s. Regarding their rationale for protesting, Stein says, "Most of the protesters ... were probably straight and did not think of themselves as gay rights advocates; they were motivated by a combination of support for student rights and opposition to antigay censorship." Similar sentiments regarding the changing cultural norms in the 1960s and opposition to censorship of LGBTQ topics have been echoed by Daniel Brooks, an LGBTQ activist in New Hope, Pennsylvania, a borough near Newtown in Bucks County.

=== Anniversary forum and later history ===
In May 2022, on the 54th anniversary of the protest, Stein led a forum at the Newtown campus to discuss the event. Titled "Bucks Looks Back: Gay Rights History Made Here", the forum featured both Kuna and Stein, as well as a teleconference call from Sassi. Additional speakers included Martin Sutton, a current professor at the college who was working there when the protest occurred, and Max Probst, a professor who served as the advisor for the college's gay–straight alliance. By this time, the community college had grown to include three campuses across the county, with a total enrollment of about 10,000. The county and college are considered much more accepting to LGBTQ individuals than during the 1968 protest, with Doylestown and New Hope having sizable LGBTQ communities and annual pride parades. In 2020, Probst announced the creation of a new queer studies class, and a few months prior to the anniversary forum, Pennsylvania state senator Steve Santarsiero hosted a forum at the college to discuss human rights protections for LGBTQ individuals in the state.

== See also ==
- 1960s in LGBT rights
- List of LGBTQ actions in the United States prior to the Stonewall riots

== Sources ==
- Bambino, Samantha (May 23, 2022). "Forgotten history: Bucks students held pre-Stonewall LGBT protest". Lower Bucks Times. Archived from the original on June 18, 2024.
- "One of the Largest Pre-Stonewall Protests Happened Here in 1968". Bucks County Community College. May 12, 2022. Archived from the original on September 21, 2023.
- Ciavaglia, Jo (June 2, 2022) [May 7, 2022]. "Before Stonewall, Bucks County Community College held one of the earliest gay rights protests. Here's how it happened". Bucks County Courier Times. Gannett. Archived from the original on January 31, 2025 – via The Herald-Times.
- "Bucks County Community College marks historic student protest". The Reporter. Digital First Media. May 31, 2022 [May 16, 2022]. Archived from the original on July 6, 2024.
- Riordan, Kevin (June 16, 2021). "Before Stonewall, LGBTQ history was made at Bucks County Community College — and then forgotten. Until now". The Philadelphia Inquirer. ISSN 0885-6613. OCLC 45211992. Archived from the original on July 14, 2024.
- Stein, Marc (November 16, 2022). "Out on Campus: A Collaborate Project on Pennsylvania LGBTQ+ History". American Historical Association. Archived from the original on November 6, 2024.
- Stein, Marc (February 8, 2023) [April 13, 2021]. ""Where Perversion Is Taught": The Untold History of a Gay Rights Demonstration at Bucks County Community College, May 9, 1968". OutHistory. Archived from the original on July 27, 2024.
- Weckerly, Dan (June 17, 2021) [June 16, 2021]. "Predating the Stonewall Riots, Bucks County Made an Early Stand for LGBTQ+ Rights". BucksCo Today. American Community Journals. Archived from the original on February 4, 2023.
- Weckerly, Dan (May 17, 2022). "Bucks County Community College Recalls Its Students' 1968 Historic Support of Gay Rights". BucksCo Today. American Community Journals. Archived from the original on August 12, 2022.
