= Leitsch =

Leitsch is a surname. Notable people with the surname include:

- Dick Leitsch (1935–2018), American activist
- Maxim Leitsch (born 1998), German footballer
