= Bristol Courier =

Bristol Courier may refer to:

- Bristol Herald Courier, a daily newspaper located in Bristol, Virginia
- The former Bristol Courier in Bristol, Pennsylvania, now merged with the Bucks County Courier Times of Levittown, Pennsylvania
