= Foster Gunnison Jr. =

American LGBT rights activist

- Born: 1925; Bronxville, New York, US
- Died: 1994 (aged 68–69); Hartford, Connecticut, US
- Education: Columbia University (BA); Trinity College (MA)
- Occupation: Activist
- Known for: The Foster Gunnison Papers
- Movement: LGBT rights

Foster Gunnison Jr. (1925–1994) was an American LGBT rights activist who collected a substantial archive of LGBT history and activism in Hartford, Connecticut. Following Gunnison's death, his family donated the archive to the University of Connecticut's Archives and Special Collections.

Born in 1925 in the upscale suburb of Bronxville, New York, Gunnison came from a privileged background. His father, Foster Gunnison Sr, was a founder of the prefabricated homes industry in the United States. Gunnison Jr. enrolled in Haverford College and transferred to Columbia University, graduating in 1949. He moved to Connecticut in 1955 to attend Trinity College, where he earned master's degrees in psychology and philosophy.

Gunnison joined the Mattachine Society in 1964. From 1965 to 1969, he collected the office and conference records of the North American Conference of Homophile Organizations (NACHO) and the Eastern Regional Conference of Homophile Organizations (ERCHO). Other collection highlights included the papers of Morris Kight and of the Barbershop Harmony Society, along with railroad memorabilia, posters, serials, and his own personal correspondence. Gunnison founded his own organization, the Institute for Social Ethics, which he described as a "libertarian-oriented research facility and think tank for controversial social issues." He published the pamphlet An Introduction to the Homophile Movement (1967).

Starting in the 1970s, Gunnison also became interested in smokers' rights, founding the American Puffer Alliance in 1984.

Gunnison died of a heart attack in January 1994 in Hartford. He was 68 years old.
