= James Gruber =

American LGBTQ rights activist (1928–2011)

James "John" Gruber
- Born: James Finley Gruber; August 21, 1928; Des Moines, Iowa
- Died: February 27, 2011 (aged 82); Santa Clara, California
- Occupation: Teacher
- Known for: Early homophile activist; co-founder of the Mattachine Society

James "John" Finley Gruber (August 21, 1928 – February 27, 2011) was an American teacher and early LGBT rights activist.

== Biography ==
James Gruber was born August 21, 1928, in Des Moines, Iowa. Growing up he considered himself bisexual and was involved with both men and women. His father, a former vaudevillian turned music teacher, relocated the family to Los Angeles in 1936. Gruber enlisted in the United States Marine Corps in 1946 at the age of 18 and was honorably discharged in 1949. Using his G.I. Bill benefits, Gruber studied English literature at Occidental College in Los Angeles.

Gruber met and began a relationship with photographer Konrad Stevens. The couple attended a meeting of an early homophile organization then called the "Society of Fools". Gruber and Stevens joined the group in April 1951 and became part of the "Fifth Order", the group's central leadership. Both men were eager to join despite not having been previously politically involved and not having backgrounds in the Marxist philosophy that informed the group. That lack of familiarity led the group to restate its ideas in ways that those without a Marxist background could understand. Founding member Chuck Rowland recalled the energy the two brought to the group. "It was like magic when they joined. Suddenly everything started to happen." Following a conversation with co-founder Harry Hay about Medieval masque troops known as "mattachines", Gruber suggested changing the group's name from "Society of Fools" to Mattachine Society. Gruber attributed Mattachine's success to the feeling of acceptance that it fostered. "All of us had known a whole lifetime of not talking, of repression. Just the freedom to open up...really, that's what it was all about. We had found a sense of belonging, of camaraderie, of openness in an atmosphere of tension and distrust....Such a great deal of it was a social climate. A family feeling came out of it, a great nonsexual emphasis....It was a brand new idea." In 1953, the Communist ties of several of the Fifth Order led the leadership, including Gruber, to resign.

Through his studies at Occidental, Gruber met the author Christopher Isherwood, who in turn introduced him to W. H. Auden. Isherwood also introduced Gruber to his landlady, Evelyn Hooker. Hooker, a psychologist, pioneered research into sexual orientation that contributed to the removal of homosexuality as a mental illness from the Diagnostic and Statistical Manual of Mental Disorders.

Growing increasingly disillusioned with life in Los Angeles, Gruber moved to Palo Alto in 1960 and changed his first name to John. He pursued a teaching career at Foothill College and San Francisco State University and also taught or tutored at Cubberly High School, Milpitas High School and de Anza College.

Gruber helped to document the early LGBT movement through interviews with historians, participating in a panel discussion in San Francisco in 2000 commemorating the 50th anniversary of the founding of Mattachine and appearing in the 2001 documentary film Hope Along the Wind about the life of Harry Hay.

== Death ==
The final surviving member of the original Mattachine Society, Gruber suffered increasingly ill health for several years before his death on February 27, 2011, at his home in Santa Clara.

== Bibliography ==
- Bullough, Vern L. "Harry Hay". Collected in Bullough, Vern L. (ed.) (2002). Before Stonewall: Activists for Gay and Lesbian Rights in Historical Context. Routledge. ISBN 1-56023-193-9
- D'Emilio, John (1983). Sexual Politics, Sexual Communities: The Making of a Homosexual Minority in the United States, 1940-1970. Chicago, University of Chicago Press. ISBN 0-226-14266-3
- Faderman, Lillian and Stuart Timmons (2006). Gay L.A.: A History of Sexual Outlaws, Power Politics, and Lipstick Lesbians. Basic Books. ISBN 0-465-02288-X
- Johansson, Warren, and William A. Percy (1994). Outing: Shattering the Conspiracy of Silence. Psychology Press. ISBN 1-56024-419-4
- Sears, James Thomas (2006). Behind the Mask of the Mattachine: The Hal Call Chronicles and the Early Movement for Homosexual Emancipation. Routledge. ISBN 1-56023-187-4
