= North American Conference of Homophile Organizations =

The North American Conference of Homophile Organizations (NACHO, pronounced "Nay-Ko") was an umbrella organization for a number of homophile organizations. Founded in 1966, the goal of NACHO was to expand coordination among homophile organizations throughout the Americas. Homophile activists were motivated in part by an increase in mainstream media attention to gay issues. Some feared that without a centralized organization, the movement would be hijacked, in the words of founding member Foster Gunnison Jr., by "fringe elements, beatniks, and other professional non-conformists".

== Origins ==
NACHO was modeled on an earlier organization, the East Coast Homophile Organizations (ECHO), that formed in 1963 to coordinate the activities of homophile groups from New York City, Washington, D.C., and Philadelphia.

== Planning conference ==
The first meeting of the organizations that would become NACHO was held over the weekend of February 18, 1966, in Kansas City under the title "National Planning Conference of Homophile Organizations". Fourteen organizations were represented at the conference, which was held in Kansas City as a centralized location. Over the next six months, the attendees set up a legal defense fund and started a newsletter.

== First meetings ==
NACHO was officially formed at a meeting held in San Francisco six months after the planning conference. Although Gunnison delivered a keynote speech calling for a strong centrally-controlled structure, others in attendance were wary. Daughters of Bilitis co-founder Del Martin and other women were growing increasingly suspicious that men could understand the needs of lesbians. Mattachine New York leader Dick Leitsch, who had influence within Mayor John Lindsay's administration, did not want to give up his organization's independence.

NACHO was hampered by internal conflicts from the beginning. Fault lines formed over membership, credentialing and voting rights, with East coast organizations favoring a more formal membership process and West coast activists wishing for a more casual members policy. Mattachine New York and ONE, Inc. refused to attend the 1967 conference in New York because of these concerns. Lesbians were also concerned that the male-dominated leadership was giving short shrift to women-specific issues.

== Slogan and the Homosexual Bill of Rights ==
At its 1968 conference in Chicago, held just weeks after the contentious Democratic National Convention, NACHO adopted the slogan "Gay is Good". Coined by founding member Frank Kameny, the slogan was modeled on the African American slogan "Black is Beautiful." NACHO also adopted a five-point Homosexual Bill of Rights at its 1968 meeting:

1. Private consensual sex between persons over the age of consent shall not be an offense.
2. Solicitation for any sexual acts shall not be an offense except upon the filing of a complaint by the aggrieved party, not a police officer or agent.
3. A person's sexual orientation or practice shall not be a factor in the granting or renewing of federal security clearances or visas, or in the granting of citizenship.
4. Service in and discharge from the Armed Forces and eligibility for veteran's benefits shall be without reference to homosexuality.
5. A person's sexual orientation or practice shall not affect his eligibility for employment with federal, state, or local governments, or private employers.

NACHO resolved to send questionnaires to political candidates to determine their positions on the points of the Bill. A number of lesbian organizations, still concerned over the lack of attention being paid to their issues, refused to participate. Daughters of Bilitis president Rita LaPorte compared the relationship between NACHO and DOB to a husband and wife. Heterosexual women, she argued, dissipated their energy through their marriages; similarly, lesbians risked dissipating their energy should DOB become a surrogate "wife" to what she perceived as the male-centered NACHO.

== Final conferences ==
NACHO held two additional conferences in 1969 and 1970, but by this time the Stonewall riots had occurred and the momentum and energy of the gay movement had shifted to more radical groups like the Gay Liberation Front and the Gay Activists Alliance. Older members and younger, more radicalized activists struggled at the 1970 convention in San Francisco, particularly over the issues of membership and participation, which led to the gay liberationists' taking control of the convention. The younger activists passed a series of resolutions supporting the Black Panthers and Women's Liberation and the immediate withdrawal of troops from Vietnam. NACHO never recovered from the conflict and the 1970 convention was the organization's last. Gay Sunshine magazine declared the convention "the battle that ended the homophile movement".

== Legacy ==
Although its existence was brief, NACHO helped start dozens of local gay groups across the country and issued position papers on a variety of LGBT-related issues. It organized national demonstrations, including a May 1966 action against military discrimination that included the country's first gay motorcade. Through its legal defense fund, NACHO challenged anti-gay laws and regulations ranging from immigration issues and military service to the legality of serving alcohol to homosexuals. It's notable that within fifty years’ time every major goal identified in the original NACHO declaration of rights has been achieved and in many ways surpassed by the passing of marriage equality, for example.

== See also ==
- List of pre-Stonewall LGBT actions in the United States
- List of LGBT rights organizations
- Timeline of LGBT history

== Works cited ==
- Andryszewski, Tricia (2000). Gay Rights. Twenty-First Century Books. ISBN 0-7613-1568-3.
- Armstrong, Elizabeth A. (2002). Forging Gay Identities: Organizing Sexuality in San Francisco, 1950-1994. Chicago, University of Chicago Press. ISBN 0-226-02694-9.
- Bianco, David (1999). Gay Essentials: Facts For Your Queer Brain. Los Angeles, Alyson Books. ISBN 1-55583-508-2.
- Blasius, Marc and Shane Phelan, eds. (1997). We Are Everywhere: A Historical Sourcebook of Gay and Lesbian Politics. New York, Routledge. ISBN 0-415-90859-0.
- Eisenbach, David (2006). Gay Power: An American Revolution. Carroll & Graf Publishers. ISBN 0-7867-1633-9.
- Fletcher, Lynne Yamaguchi (1992). The First Gay Pope and Other Records. Boston, Alyson Publications. ISBN 1-55583-206-7.
- Kaiser, Charles (1997). The Gay Metropolis 1940–1960. Boston, Houghton Mifflin Company. ISBN 0-395-65781-4.
- Moyer, Bill, Joann Macalister, Mary Lou Finley and Steve Soifer (2001). Doing Democracy: The MAP Model for Organizing Social Movements. New Society Publishers. ISBN 0-86571-418-5.
- Witt, Lynn, Sherry Thomas and Eric Marcus, eds. (1995). Out in All Directions: The Almanac of Gay and Lesbian America. New York, Warner Books. ISBN 0-446-67237-8.
