= Black Nite brawl =

Civil rights event in U.S.

The Black Nite brawl was a self-defense resistance action carried out by LGBTQ+ patrons of the Black Nite bar in Milwaukee, Wisconsin, on August 5, 1961. The patrons successfully defended themselves and the bar from a violent homophobic attack.

== Location ==
Black Nite was a popular gay bar on 400 N. Plankinton Avenue, just south of downtown Milwaukee. The owner, Wally Whetham, had renamed the establishment from Mary's Tap and reopened it the year before the brawl.

== Brawl ==
On the night of August 5, four U.S. military servicemen attempting to enter Black Nite refused to show their IDs and were forcibly removed, injuring one of the servicemen and a Black Nite patron named Josie Carter. The servicemen then recruited 10-15 allies from another bar and returned to Black Nite, where they entered and began assaulting the patrons and destroying property. Approximately 75 Black Nite patrons were present at the time. The patrons fought back against the attackers in a brawl that injured several patrons and did $2000 (over $20,000 in 2024) damage to the bar. The attackers had fled by the time police arrived but were soon identified and arrested. However the presiding judge dismissed the charges due to lack of evidence. Black Nite changed its name the next year, and it was demolished along with the surrounding neighborhood during freeway expansion in 1966.

== Legacy ==
The Black Nite brawl is recognized as an important precursor to the broader LGBTQ+ civil rights movement. It also inspired later leaders in Milwaukee's LGBTQ+ community, including Eldon Murray and Alyn Hess. In 2022, the Milwaukee County Landmarks Committee named the former site of Black Nite a historic landmark. In 2024, a historic marker, sponsored by the Wisconsin LGBTQ History Project, was erected and dedicated at the former site of Black Nite. Wisconsin governor Tony Evers proclaimed August 5, 2024 as Black Nite Remembrance Day.
