= The Politics of Being Queer =

1969 essay by Paul Goodman

"The Politics of Being Queer" is a 1969 essay by Paul Goodman on the connection between his bisexuality and his personal politics. It is noteworthy for its role in reclaiming the word "queer". Originally published as "Memoirs of an Ancient Activist", Goodman revised the essay, which was retitled and published posthumously.

== Summary ==
In "The Politics of Being Queer", Goodman credits his bisexuality as undergirding his anarchism, pacifism, and utopianism. He contends that promiscuity breaks social class boundaries and that rigidly exclusive attraction, whether heterosexual or homosexual, is pathological.

He described his relationships with young boys as being neither exploitative or pathological, despite public opinion, and that same-sex sexuality was a healthy prelude to friendship and student–mentor relationships.

== Publication ==
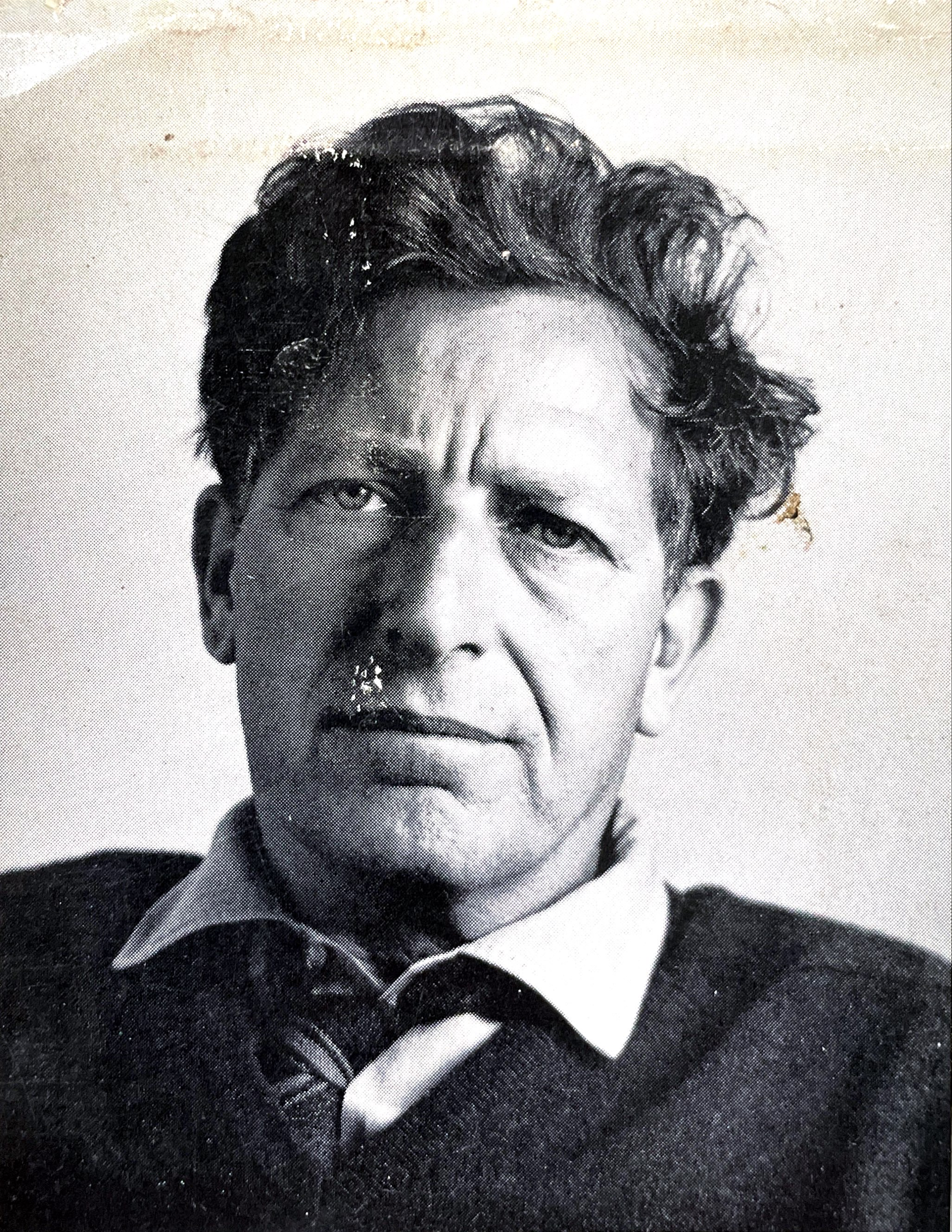
The author, c. 1969

The essay was first published in the pacifist magazine WIN on November 15, 1969, as "Memoirs of an Ancient Activist". It was reprinted in The Homosexual Dialectic (1972) and The Gay Liberation Book (1973). Goodman revised the essay, which was found among his papers after his 1972 death. The revised edition first appeared in the journal Unmuzzled Ox (1977) and then in Nature Heals, a 1977 collection of Goodman's psychological essays.

== Legacy ==
The essay is credited as a precursor for reclaiming the word "queer", which had been used as a derogatory term for nontraditional gender behavior for the preceding part of the 20th century. His assertion that queerness was not pathological also encouraged activists to reclaim the word. The rest of his ideas were not as readily adopted by the burgeoning 1960s gay liberation movement. Journalist and civil libertarian Judith Levine described the essay as one of Goodman's most personal and beautiful. Novelist Kerry Howley wrote that the essay was even more subversive 40 years later, with Goodman's praise of anonymous sex and assertion that teacher–student relationships are inherently erotic.
