= Fannie Mae Clackum =

Fannie Mae Clackum (June 10, 1929 – August 16, 2014) was the first person to successfully challenge her discharge on the grounds of homosexuality from the U.S military.

Fannie Mae Clackum served as a US Air Force Reservist in the late 1940s and early 1950s. When the Air Force suspected her and Grace Garner of being lesbians, it arranged for a four-person overnight trip and motel stay. The U.S. Air Force Office of Special Investigations used those events as the basis of a series of interrogations in April 1951 when the pair were accused of being lesbians. They refused to accept the dishonorable discharges the Air Force offered them and demanded a court-martial.

They were demoted from corporal to private, discharged in early 1952 and lived together in Marietta, Georgia. They spent eight years fighting their discharges in the US Court of Claims claiming denial of due process when denied courts-martial and discharged administratively. They prevailed in 1960 when the court invalidated the discharges and awarded them their back military pay for the remainder of their enlistment periods. The court, after recounting the Air Force's account of its investigation, said: "One's reaction to the foregoing narrative is 'What's going on here?'" The court found it "unthinkable" that the Air Force would burden them with undesirable discharges "without respect for even the most elementary notions of due process of law". Theirs is the earliest known case of the successful appeal of a discharge from the U.S. Armed Forces on grounds of homosexuality, though the case turned on due process claims, not homosexuality as the basis for their exclusion from military service. Lillian Faderman states that Clackum's victory "suggests that in somewhat saner times [1961] an objective court could understand how outrageous the military's tactics were."

== See also ==
- Sexual orientation and the United States military
