= Julius (restaurant) =

Restaurant in Manhattan, New York

- Julius' Bar
- U.S. National Register of Historic Places
- U.S. Historic district – Contributing property
- New York State Register of Historic Places
- New York City Landmark
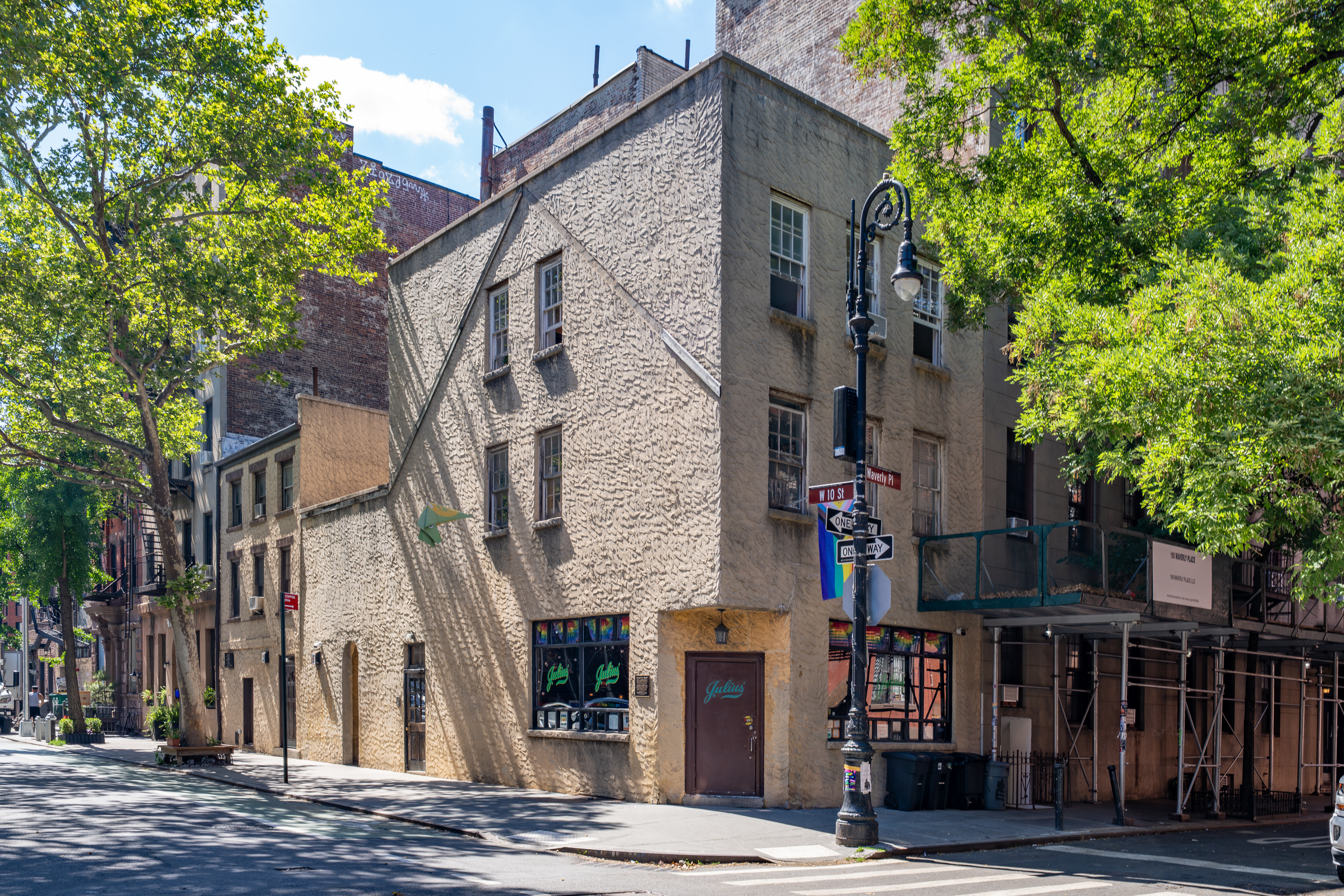
- South (front) facade in 2026
- Location: 155-159 West 10th Street (aka 186-188 Waverly Place); Manhattan, New York
- Coordinates: 40°44′4″N 74°0′5″W
- Built: 1867
- Website: juliusbarny.com
- Part of: Greenwich Village Historic District (ID79001604)
- NRHP reference No.: 16000242
- NYSRHP No.: 06101.005602
- NYCL No.: 2663

Significant dates
- Added to NRHP: April 20, 2016
- Designated CP: June 19, 1979
- Designated NYSRHP: March 24, 2016
- Designated NYCL: December 6, 2022

Julius' (also known as Julius's or Julius' Bar) is a tavern at 159 West 10th Street and Waverly Place in the Greenwich Village neighborhood of Manhattan in New York City. It is often called the oldest continuously operating gay bar in New York City. Its management, however, was actively unwilling to operate as such, and harassed gay customers until 1966. The April 1966 "Sip-In" at Julius, located a block northeast of the Stonewall Inn, established the right of gay people to be served in licensed premises in New York. This action helped clear the way for gay premises with state liquor licenses.

Newspaper articles on the wall indicate it was the favorite bar of Tennessee Williams, Truman Capote and Rudolf Nureyev. In 2016, it was listed on the National Register of Historic Places.

== History ==
According to bar lore it was established around 1867 – the same year as the Jacob Ruppert Brewery in the Yorkville neighborhood. Per the current owner, the establishment opened in 1864. Barrels stamped "Jacob Ruppert" are used for tables. Vintage photos of racing horses, boxers and actors are on the wall include drawings of burlesque girls as well as an image signed by Walter Winchell saying that he loves Julius. The bar became a popular watering hole in the 1930s and 1940s due to its proximity to the jazz club Nick's in the Village.

By the late 1950s, it was attracting gay patrons. At the time the New York State Liquor Authority had a rule that ordered bars not to serve liquor to the disorderly, and homosexuals per se were considered "disorderly." Bartenders would often evict known homosexuals or order them not to face other customers in order to avoid cruising. Despite this, gay men continued to be a large part of the clientele into the early 1960s, and the management of Julius, steadfastly unwilling for it to become a gay bar, continued to harass them.

=== The Sip-In ===
On April 21, 1966 members of the New York Chapter of the Mattachine Society staged a "Sip-In" at the bar which was to change the legal landscape. Dick Leitsch and Craig Rodwell, the society's president and vice president respectively, and another society activist, John Timmons, planned to draw attention to the practice by identifying themselves as homosexuals before ordering a drink in order to bring court scrutiny to the regulation. The three were going to read from Mattachine stationery "We are homosexuals. We are orderly, we intend to remain orderly, and we are asking for service."

The three first targeted the Ukrainian-American Village Restaurant at St. Mark's Place and Third Avenue in the East Village, Manhattan which had a sign, "If you are gay, please go away." The three showed up after a New York Times reporter had asked a manager about the protest and the manager had closed the restaurant for the day. Secondly, they targeted a bar called Dom's, which was also closed. They then targeted a Howard Johnson's and a bar called Waikiki where they were served in spite of the note with a bartender saying later, "How do I know they're homosexual? They ain't doing nothing homosexual."

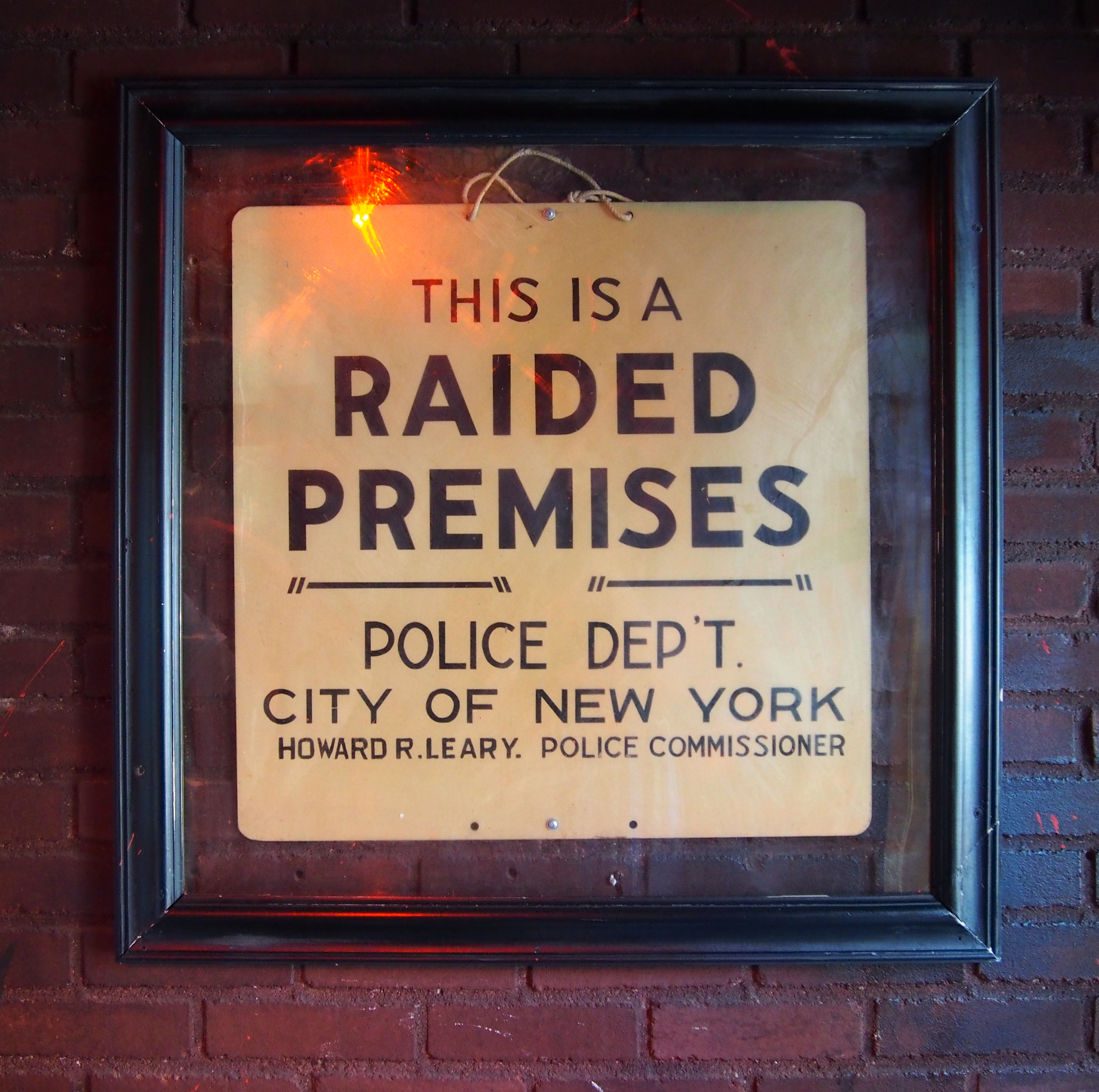
Raid sign (from Stonewall) exactly as it would have appeared at Julius' in 1966

Frustrated, they then went to Julius, where a clergyman had been arrested a few days earlier for soliciting sex. A sign in the window read, "This is a raided premises." The bartender initially started preparing them a drink but then put his hand over the glass, which was photographed. The New York Times ran the headline "3 Deviates Invite Exclusion by Bars" the next day.

The Mattachine Society then challenged the liquor rule in court and the courts ruled that gays had a right to peacefully assemble, which undercut the previous SLA contention that the presence of gay clientele automatically was grounds for charges of operating a "disorderly" premise. With this right established a new era of licensed, legally operating gay bars began. The bar held a monthly dance party (2008–2024) called Mattachine co-founded and DJ'd by John Cameron Mitchell, Amber Martin, P.J. Deboy, Paul Dawson and Angela DiCarlo.

On the anniversary of the Sip-In, a plaque was added in 2022 by the Village Preservation and the NYC LGBT Historic Sites Project to commemorate the bar's role in LGBT history and activism.

=== Subsequent history ===
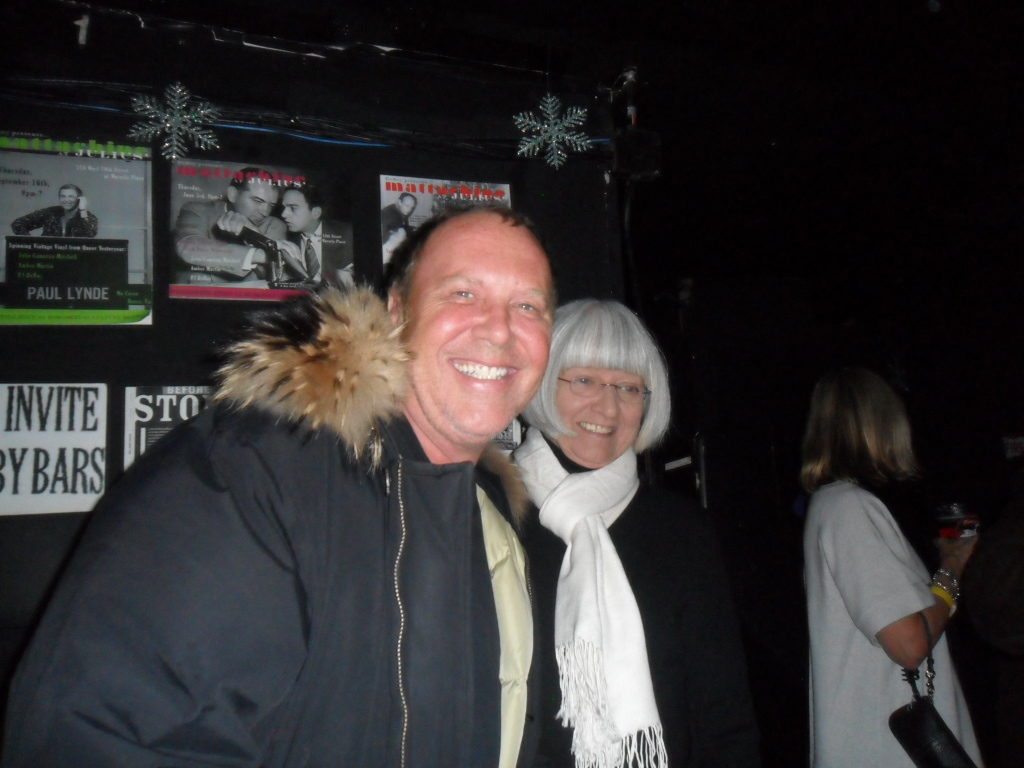
Michael Kors (left) at Julius with a fan in January 2015

In August 2007, the bar was closed briefly after being seized for non-payment of taxes.

==== Landmark statuses ====
In 2012, in response to research and a request from the Greenwich Village Society for Historic Preservation, the New York State Division for Historic Preservation determined Julius eligible for listing on the National Register of Historic Places. Separate from that initiative, the NYC LGBT Historic Sites Project proposed, sponsored, and prepared the National Register of Historic Places nomination for Julius'. As a result, the building was listed on the New York State Register of Historic Places in 2015 and the National Register in 2016, one day before the 50th anniversary of the "Sip-In."

A plaque commemorating the 1966 "sip-in" at Julius was dedicated in April 2022. After preservationists had advocated for the bar to be designated as a city landmark for ten years, the New York City Landmarks Preservation Commission (LPC) hosted hearings in September 2022 to determine whether the bar should be designated. The LPC designated the Julius Bar Building as a New York City landmark in December 2022.

== In popular culture ==
- Scenes from the film The Boys in the Band (1970) were shot at the bar.
- Julius was the site of a scene shot in the film Next Stop, Greenwich Village (1976). The scene includes Lenny Baker and Christopher Walken.
- Julius was also featured prominently in the film Can You Ever Forgive Me? (2018), starring Melissa McCarthy and Richard E. Grant.

The Julius' denial of service was dramatized in the film Stonewall (1995). However, filmmakers moved the denial of service from Julius to the Stonewall Inn.

== See also ==
- LGBT culture in New York City
- List of LGBTQ bars
- List of pre-Stonewall LGBT actions in the United States
- List of New York City Designated Landmarks in Manhattan below 14th Street
- National Register of Historic Places listings in Manhattan below 14th Street
