= Bucks County Community College =

Community college in Bucks County, Pennsylvania

- Type: Public community college
- Established: 1964; 62 years ago
- President: Patrick M. Jones, Ph.D.
- Faculty: 618
- Students: 4,119 full time 5,530 part time
- Location: Newtown, Perkasie, Bristol, Pennsylvania, USA; 40°14′21″N 74°57′58″W
- Campus: Suburban
- Website: www.bucks.edu

Bucks County Community College (Bucks) is a public community college in Bucks County, Pennsylvania. Founded in 1964, Bucks has three campuses and online courses: a main campus in Newtown, an "Upper Bucks" campus in the town of Perkasie, and a "Lower Bucks" campus in the town of Bristol. There are also various satellite facilities located throughout the county. The college offers courses via face-to-face classroom-based instruction, eLearning classes offered completely online (often referred to as distance learning), and in hybrid (blended) modes that combine face-to-face instruction with online learning. The college is accredited by the Middle States Commission on Higher Education.

== History ==
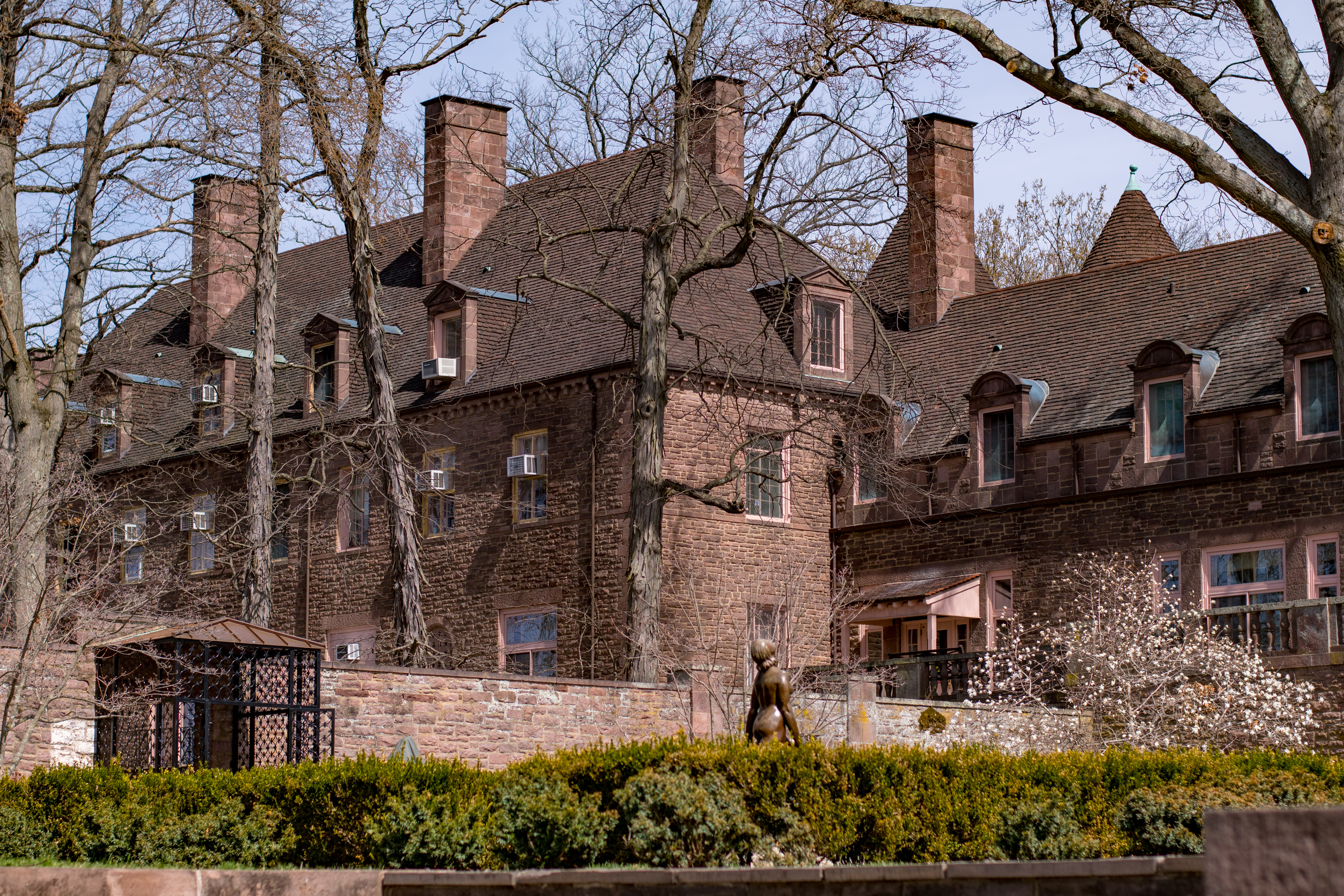
Tyler Hall & Gardens

The main Newtown campus is located on a former estate that Bucks County acquired in very early 1965 from Temple University, which had inherited it from Stella Elkins Tyler, a wealthy benefactor, only two years before. The George F. Tyler Mansion houses administrative offices. It was added to the National Register of Historic Places in 1987.

In 1968, about 200 students participated in a protest after the president of the college canceled a planned speech by gay rights activist Dick Leitsch. It is notable as one of only two gay rights protests to occur on a college campus prior to the 1969 Stonewall riots.

== Locations ==
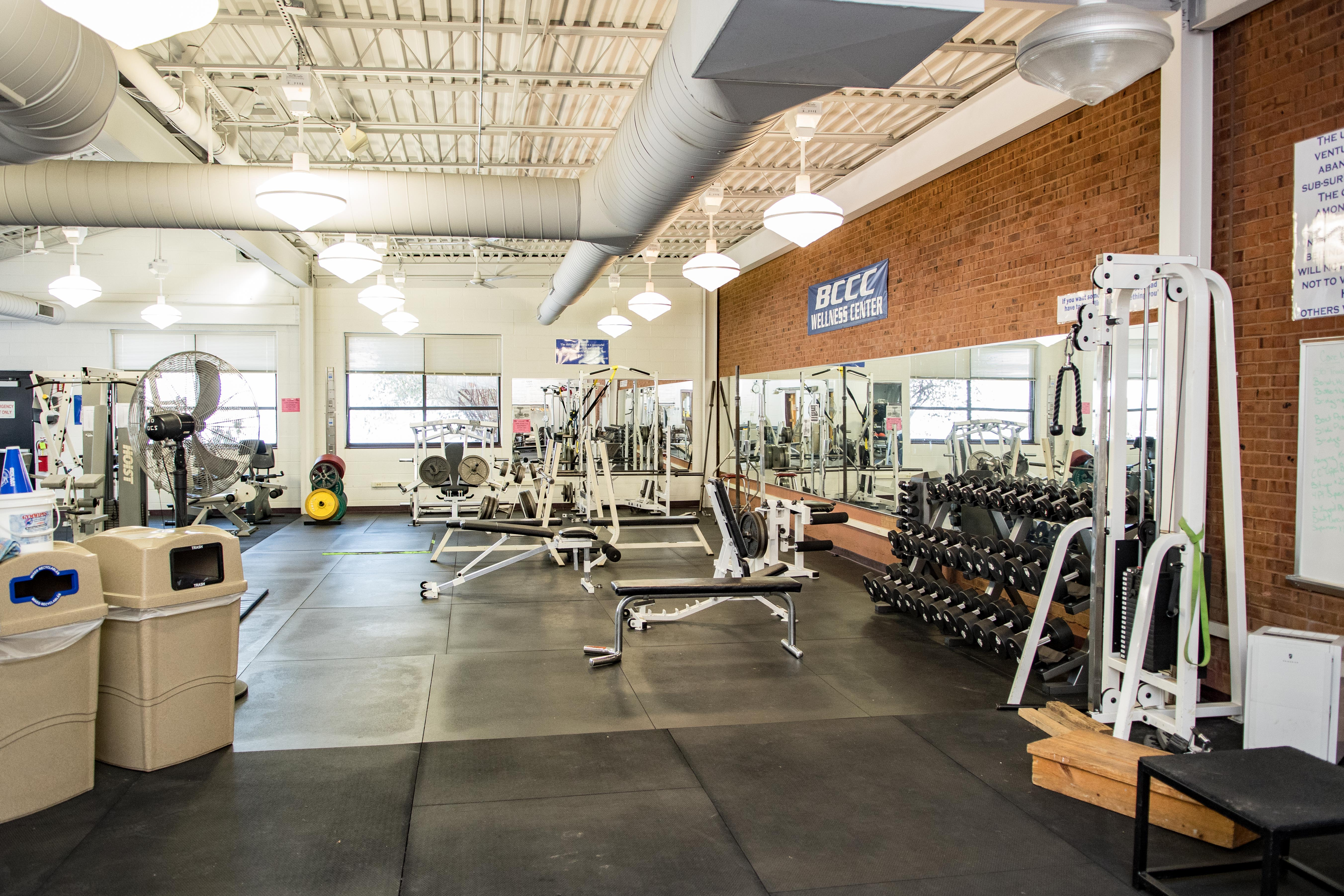
Fitness Center

Bucks has three campuses and also offers online classes.

=== Newtown ===
Newtown Campus is the oldest and largest campus, and is located at 275 Swamp Road in Newtown, Pennsylvania – directly adjacent to Tyler State Park.

Facilities include: library, computer labs, science labs, teleconference center, art studios and workshops, TV studios, auditorium, early learning center, fitness center, gymnasium, cafeteria, and café.

==== Zlock Performing Arts Center ====
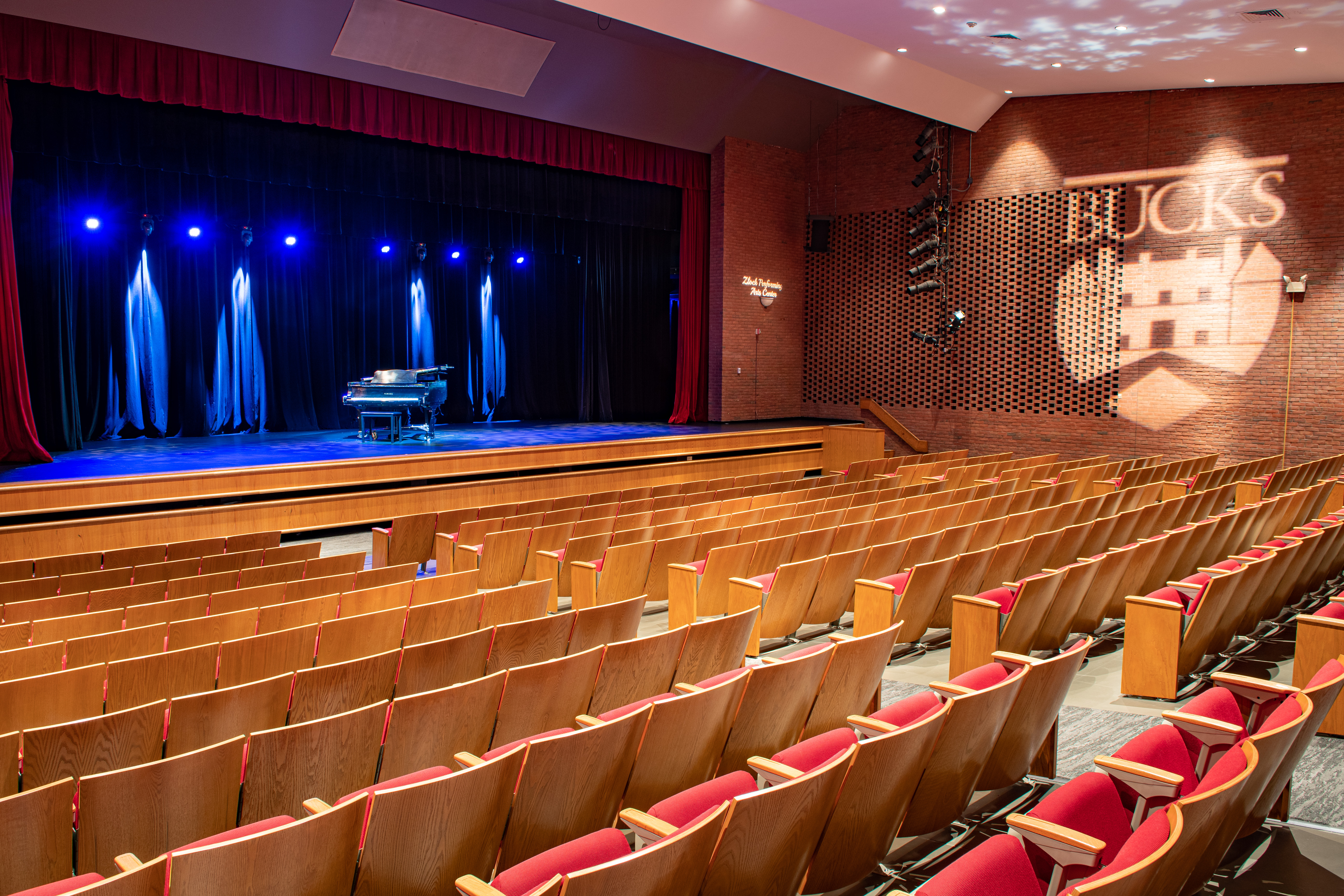
Zlock Performing Arts Center

In October 2014, the Gateway Auditorium would be renamed in honor of local philanthropists Kevin and Sima Zlock.

=== Upper Bucks ===
The Upper Bucks Campus in Perkasie, Pennsylvania opened in 1999

=== Lower Bucks ===
Established in 2007, the Gene & Marlene Epstein Campus at Lower Bucks is located in Bristol, Pennsylvania.

== Academics ==
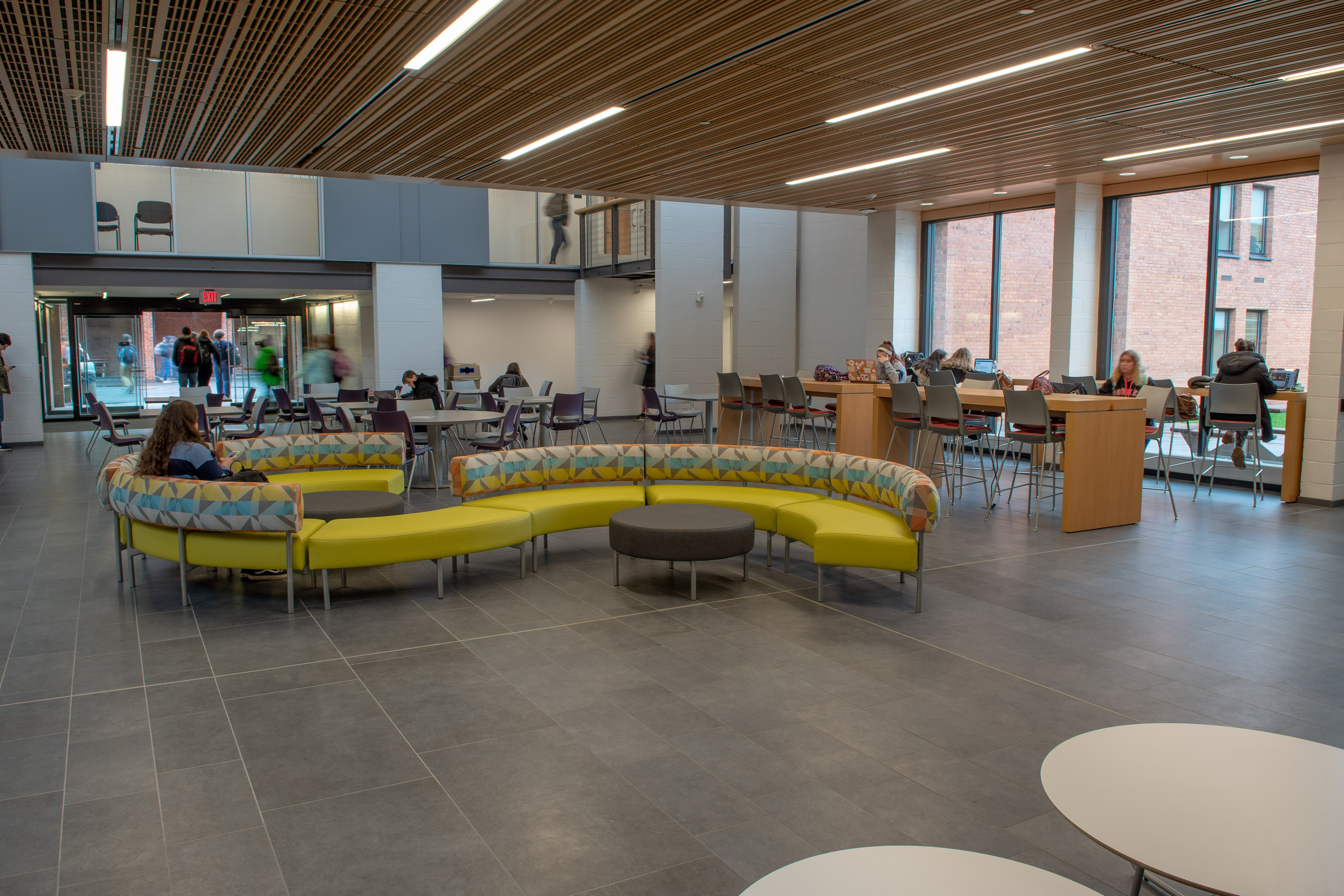
Founders Hall

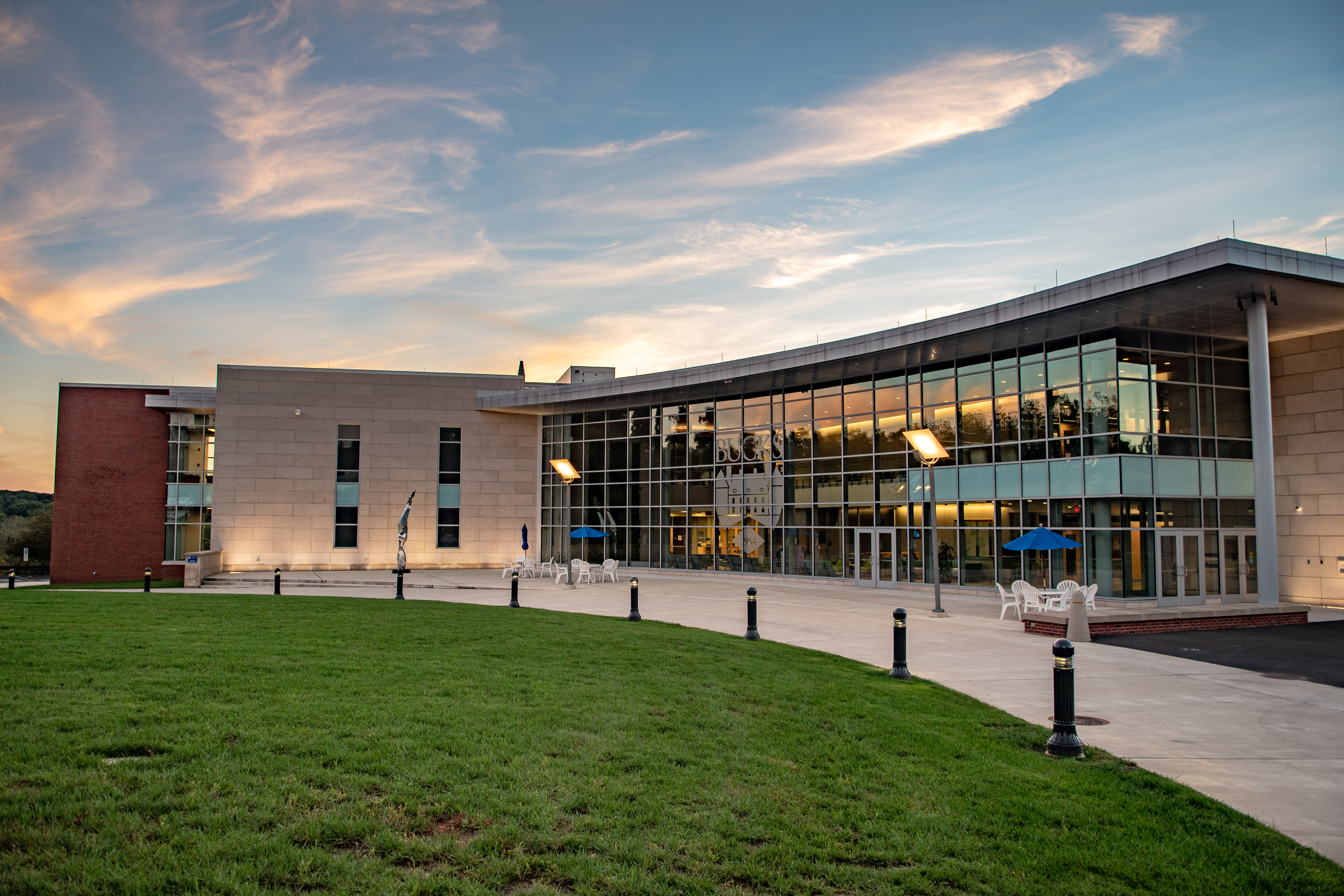
Science Center, Newtown

Bucks offers over 90 academic programs within 7 schools, including 43 associate degree programs designed to transfer to a four-year institution for the completion of a Bachelor's Degree. There are also 23 occupational associate degree programs and 27 certificate programs, both designed to prepare students to directly enter the workforce in a variety of disciplines. The schools at the college include:

- Business & Legal Studies Business Administration, Culinary Arts, Paralegal, and Accounting & Analytics programs accredited by the Accreditation Council for Business Schools and Programs (ACBSP).
- Health Sciences
- Kinesiology & Sport Studies
- Language & Literature
- Science, Technology, Engineering, and Mathematics
- Social & Behavioral Sciences
- Visual & Performing Arts

The School of Language & Literature also hosts the Wordsmiths Series, and is the home of the Tyler Literary Society's Literary magazine now in its 31st year.

Students can take advantage of transfer agreements with four-year institutions to complete their Bachelor's Degree, including many dual enrollment agreements with nearby colleges and universities.

== Continuing Education ==
The Continuing Education Department offers classes for Personal Enrichment and Professional Development.

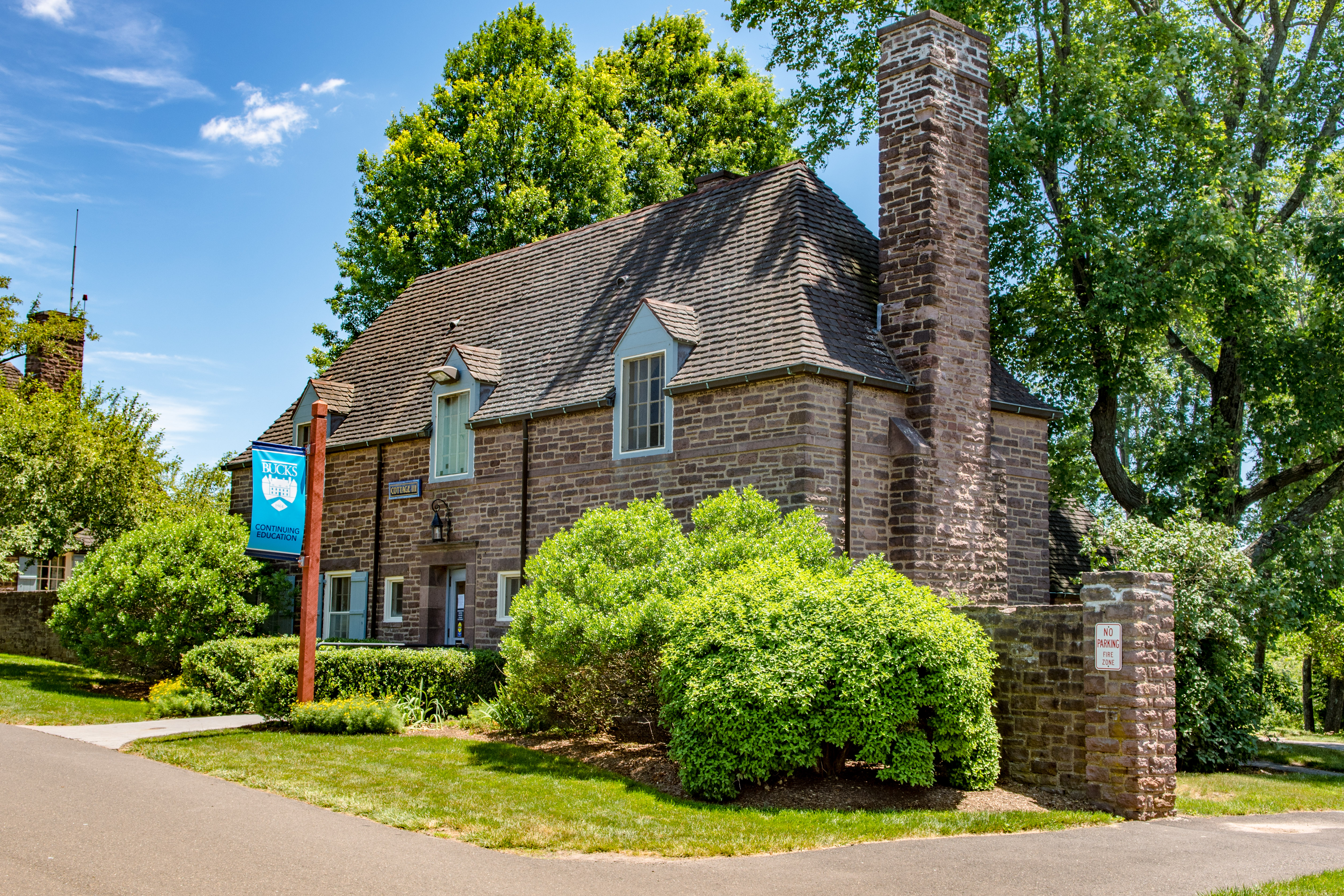
The Cottages

=== IT Academy ===
The IT Academy at Bucks County Community College offers training for technology certification programs, as well as other technology courses. Certifications include CompTIA, Cisco Certified Networking Associate (CCNA), Certified Information Systems Security Professional (CISSP), Amazon Web Services (aws), and more.

=== Center for Workforce Development ===
The Center for Workforce Development offers Career and Workforce Training, some of which is in partnership with PA CareerLink and the County of Bucks. A new Center for Advanced Manufacturing began construction in the spring of 2021 at the Lower Bucks Campus.

=== Fire & Public Safety ===
Department of Public and Industrial Safety Training & Certification offers training and accredited certifications in public safety operation and management, emergency management, Occupational Safety and Health Administration (OSHA) industrial safety, and hazmat procedure. They also host Fire Training Weekends for Pennsylvania fire departments.

== Alumni ==
Some notable graduates include Steve Capus, Anthony Fedorov, Patrick Murphy, Terri Schiavo, and Allen Genkin.
