= Bucks County Courier Times =

Newspaper in Levittown, Pennsylvania

- Type: Daily newspaper
- Format: Broadsheet
- Owner: USA Today Co.
- Publisher: Michael Jameson
- Editor: Shane Fitzgerald
- Founded: 1954 (as the Bristol Courier)
- Headquarters: 8400 N. Bristol Pk; Levittown, Pennsylvania 19057
- Circulation: 15,299 (as of 2018)
- Website: buckscountycouriertimes.com

The Bucks County Courier Times is a daily newspaper located in Levittown, Pennsylvania, United States, now operated by USA Today Co.

== History ==
A precursor to the Bucks County Courier Times was founded in 1954 when Calkins Newspapers, Inc. purchased the Bristol Courier. The Bristol Courier would later merge with the Levittown Times and the Bucks County Courier Times was born. In July 2017 Calkins Media was bought by GateHouse Media. New Media Group, the parent of Gatehouse, was bought by Gannett which now operates the paper. The web site was folded into a Gannett site phillyburbs.com in January 2023.
