= Dick Leitsch =

American gay rights activist (1935–2018)

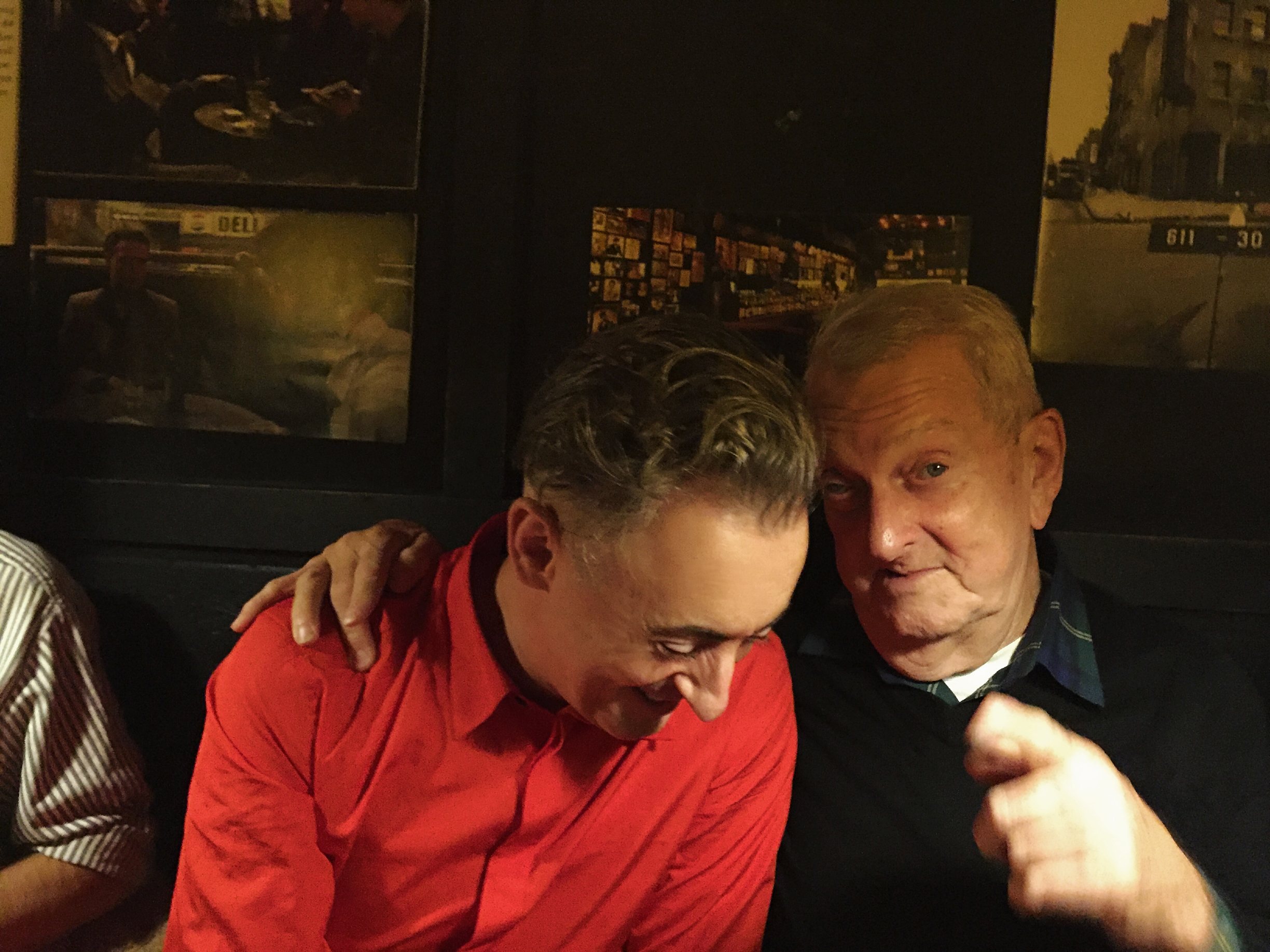
- Dick Leitsch (right) with Alan Cumming
- Born: Richard Joseph Leitsch; May 11, 1935; Louisville, Kentucky, U.S.
- Died: June 22, 2018 (aged 83); New York City, U.S.
- Occupation: Activist

Richard Joseph Leitsch (May 11, 1935 – June 22, 2018), also known as Richard Valentine Leitsch and more commonly Dick Leitsch, was an American LGBT rights activist. He was president of gay rights group the Mattachine Society in the 1960s. He conceptualized and led the "Sip-In" at Julius' Bar, one of the earliest acts of gay civil disobedience in the United States, LGBT activists used "sip-ins" to attempt to gain the legal right to drink in bars in New York. He was also known for being the first gay reporter to publish an account of the Stonewall Riots and the first person to interview Bette Midler in print media.

== Life and career ==
=== Early life ===
Richard Joseph Leitsch (who also went by Richard Valentine Leitsch, adopting a family name as his middle name) was born on May 11, 1935, in Louisville, Kentucky to Joseph Leitsch, who owned a wholesale tobacco business, and Ann (Moran) Leitsch. Richard, known as Dick, had three younger siblings. Leitsch's desire from childhood to live in New York City was influenced by movies and live radio broadcasts based in New York.

Leitsch later said that he first experienced attraction towards boys in elementary school, then had his first sexual experiences as a student at Flaget High School. Though he lived in a Catholic setting with his family and accounts vary as to whether he came out to his parents explicitly, they were broadly accepting and unusually progressive for the time. Leitsch graduated from high school in 1953 and went on to Bellarmine University, though he did not finish his degree.

=== Move to New York ===
Leitsch moved to New York City in 1959. While cruising down Greenwich Avenue, Leitsch encountered an attractive man named Craig Rodwell who invited Leitsch back to his apartment. The two eventually began a love affair. Leitsch would call Rodwell and ask him if he wanted to go to the movies, only to be told by Rodwell that he was going to the Mattachine meetings. Initially, Leitsch laughed. He had been to a Mattachine meeting in 1962 where he heard Albert Ellis give a lecture on homosexuality as an illness. Leitsch felt revolted when Ellis received a standing ovation and had no further interest in an organization which he viewed as out of step with the times. Eventually though, in an effort to spend more time with Rodwell, Leitsch agreed to attend Mattachine meetings with him. Eventually Leitsch became an active member of Mattachine, putting in many hours of volunteering.

=== Mattachine years ===
Inspired by a fiery and eloquent speech given by Frank Kameny advocating for the gay rights movement to model themselves after the highly successful Civil Rights Movement, Julian Hodges organized a group to run for election in 1965. Hodges would run for president, and Leitsch as president-elect. Initially reluctant, Leitsch eventually agreed to run on the ticket. In his statement of intent, Leitsch promised to work on ending police entrapment of gay men and various forms of discrimination. The progressive platform proved right for the times and the ticket swept the May elections.

Unexpectedly, Julian Hodges stepped down later that year. In the course of less than a year, Leitsch went from a reluctant President-Elect to President of Mattachine-New York. These events occurred around the same time that John Lindsay was inaugurated as the Mayor of New York City. Leitsch worked behind the scenes frequently with the new mayor on gay issues in the city.

==== The Sip-In ====
Inspired by the lunch counter sit-ins in the south, Leitsch conceptualized the "sip-in".

On April 21, 1966, members of the New York Chapter of the Mattachine Society staged a "sip-in" aiming to change the legal landscape. Dick Leitsch, the society's president, Craig Rodwell the society's vice president, and Mattachine activist John Timmons planned to draw attention to the practice by identifying themselves as homosexuals before ordering a drink in order to bring court scrutiny to the regulation. Leitsch is said to have stated: "We are homosexuals. We are orderly, we intend to remain orderly, and we are asking for service."

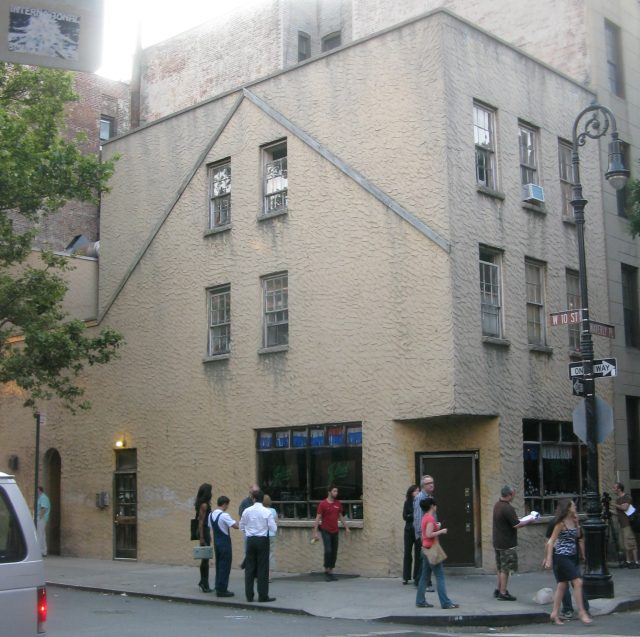
Exterior view of Julius' Bar, location of the Sip-In.

The three first targeted the Ukrainian-American Village Restaurant at St. Mark's Place and Third Avenue in the East Village, Manhattan which had a sign, "If you are gay, please go away." In Leitsch's words, "being gay, we got there late" when the three showed up after a New York Times reporter had asked a manager about the protest and the manager had closed the restaurant for the day. They then targeted a Howard Johnson's and a bar called Waikiki where they were served in spite of the note, with a bartender saying later, "How do I know they're homosexual? They ain't doing nothing homosexual."

Frustrated, they then went to Julius, where a clergyman had been arrested a few days earlier for soliciting sex. The group was joined there by Mattachine member Randy Wicker, as well as a New York Times reporter and a Village Voice photographer, Fred W. McDarrah. A sign in the window read, "This is a raided premises." The bartender initially started preparing them a drink, but then put his hand over the glass which McDarrah then photographed, after Leitsch announced, "We are homosexuals." He went on, "We are orderly, we intend to remain orderly, and we are asking for service." The New York Times ran a headline the next day "3 Deviates Invite Exclusion by Bars."

The Mattachines then challenged the liquor rule in court and the courts ruled that gays had a right to peacefully assemble, which undercut the previous SLA contention that the presence of gay clientele automatically was grounds for charges of operating a "disorderly" premise. Although the court battle did not result in as clean a decision as the men hoped for, the event itself fueled hope within the queer community as perhaps the first open act of gay civil disobedience. Although gay bars eventually became legal after a similar sip-in challenge in New Jersey, police still made excuses to raid gay bars.

The National Park Service Register of Historic Places for Julius' Bar states: "Scholars of gay history consider the sip-in at Julius’ as a key event leading to the growth of legitimate gay bars and the development of the bar as the central social space for urban gay men and lesbians."

The bar now holds a monthly party called "Mattachine" honoring the early gay rights pioneers.

=== Journalism ===
==== Stonewall riots ====
During the Stonewall riots, Leitsch was the first gay journalist to report on the riot.

On June 28, 1969, Leitsch witnessed the Stonewall riots in Greenwich Village after taking a cab and walking there after hearing on a late night radio broadcast that trouble was brewing outside a Greenwich Village gay bar. After the police cleared the area, he returned to the Mattachine offices and wrote about the riots, thus being the first person to talk about the event. Initially his account was printed as a special Mattachine newsletter to be distributed among Mattachine-New York members, but then a copy of Leitsch's account was published in the September 1969 issue of The Advocate.

From the published account:

Momentarily, 50 or more homosexuals who would have been described as "nelly" rushed the cops and took the boy back into the crowd. They then formed a solid front and refused to let the cops into the crowd to regain their prisoner, letting the cops hit them with their sticks, rather than let them through. It was an interesting side-light on the demonstrations that those usually put down as "sissies" or "swishes" showed the most courage and sense during the action. Their bravery and daring saved many people from being hurt, and their sense of humor and "camp" helped keep the crowds from getting too nasty or too violent.

==== Bette Midler ====
Leitsch wrote frequently for the first gay newspaper based in New York City, named Gay (affiliated with Screw magazine). His editor and the owner of Gay pushed him to interview a then-unknown singer by the name of Bette Midler. The interview was published in the October 26, 1970, edition of the paper, titled "The Whole World's a Bath!". It was the first interview of Bette Midler ever published.

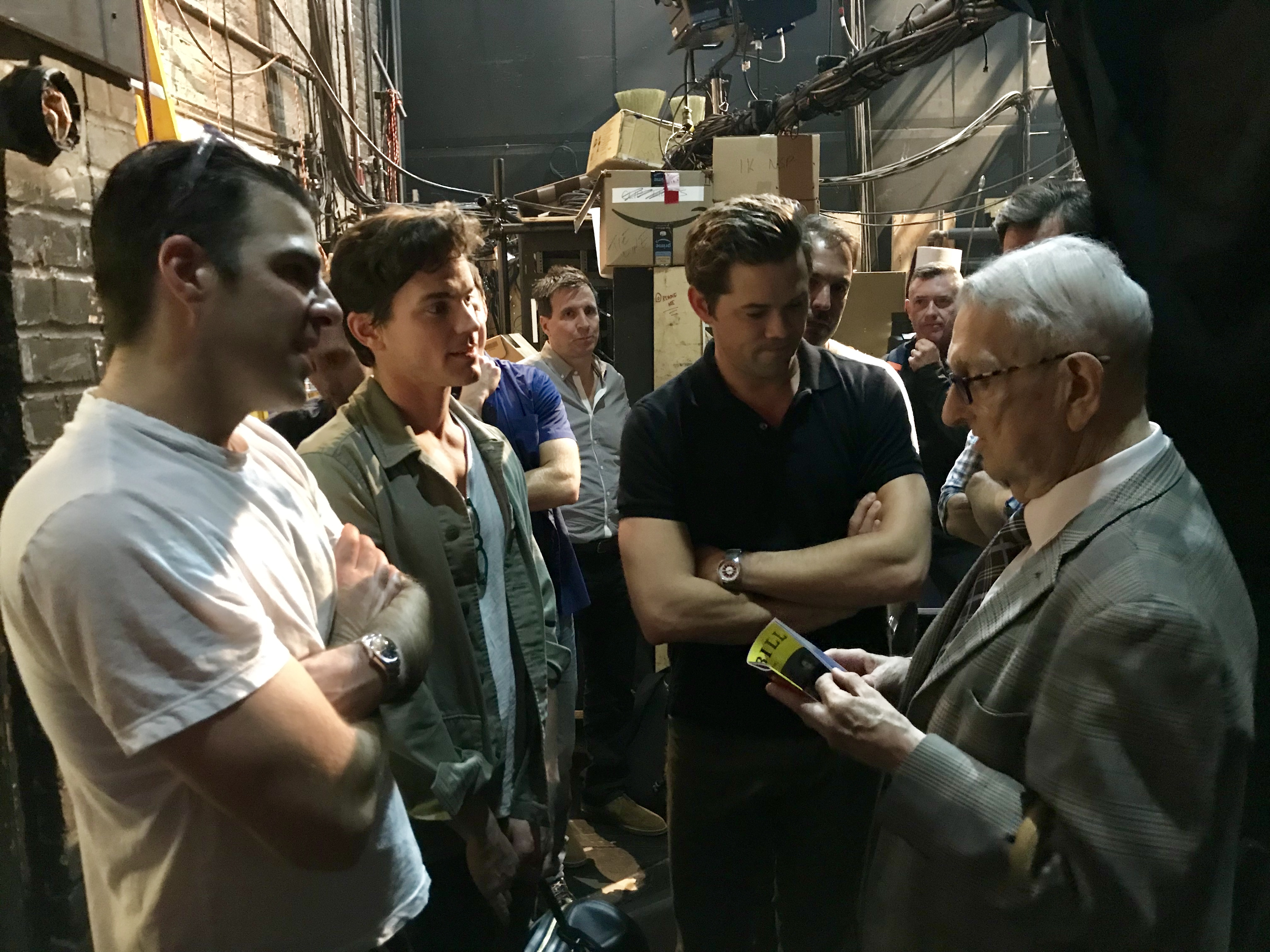
Leitsch with the cast of The Boys in the Band, Zachary Quinto, Matt Bomer and Andrew Rannells, 2018.

=== Other work and retirement ===
During this pre-Stonewall era, anyone who was publicly homosexual had great difficulty staying employed in white-collar positions. Due to being publicly gay, even in interviews, Leitsch took whatever jobs provided a livable income. He primarily worked as a bartender but held various occupations including journalist, author, painter and holiday decorator. He retired in 2000, thereafter volunteering much of his time at the Episcopal Church of Saint Mary the Virgin in Manhattan.

== Personal life and death ==
Leitsch's long-time partner was Timothy Scofield. They were together for 17 years before Scofield died in 1989 following an AIDS diagnosis.

In April 2018, Leitsch donated his personal papers as well as a large number of Mattachine papers to the New York Public Library, following his terminal cancer diagnosis.

Leitsch died from liver cancer in Manhattan on June 22, 2018. He is interred at the Church of St. Luke in the Fields, an Episcopal Church in Greenwich Village.

== Legacy ==
Season 4 episode 10 of the podcast “Making Gay History” is about Leitsch, and a bonus episode of that podcast is about and in memory of Leitsch.

== See also ==
- 1968 Bucks County Community College protest - A protest of about 200 students after the college canceled a planned speech by Leitsch
