= Mattachine Society =

American gay male advocacy group

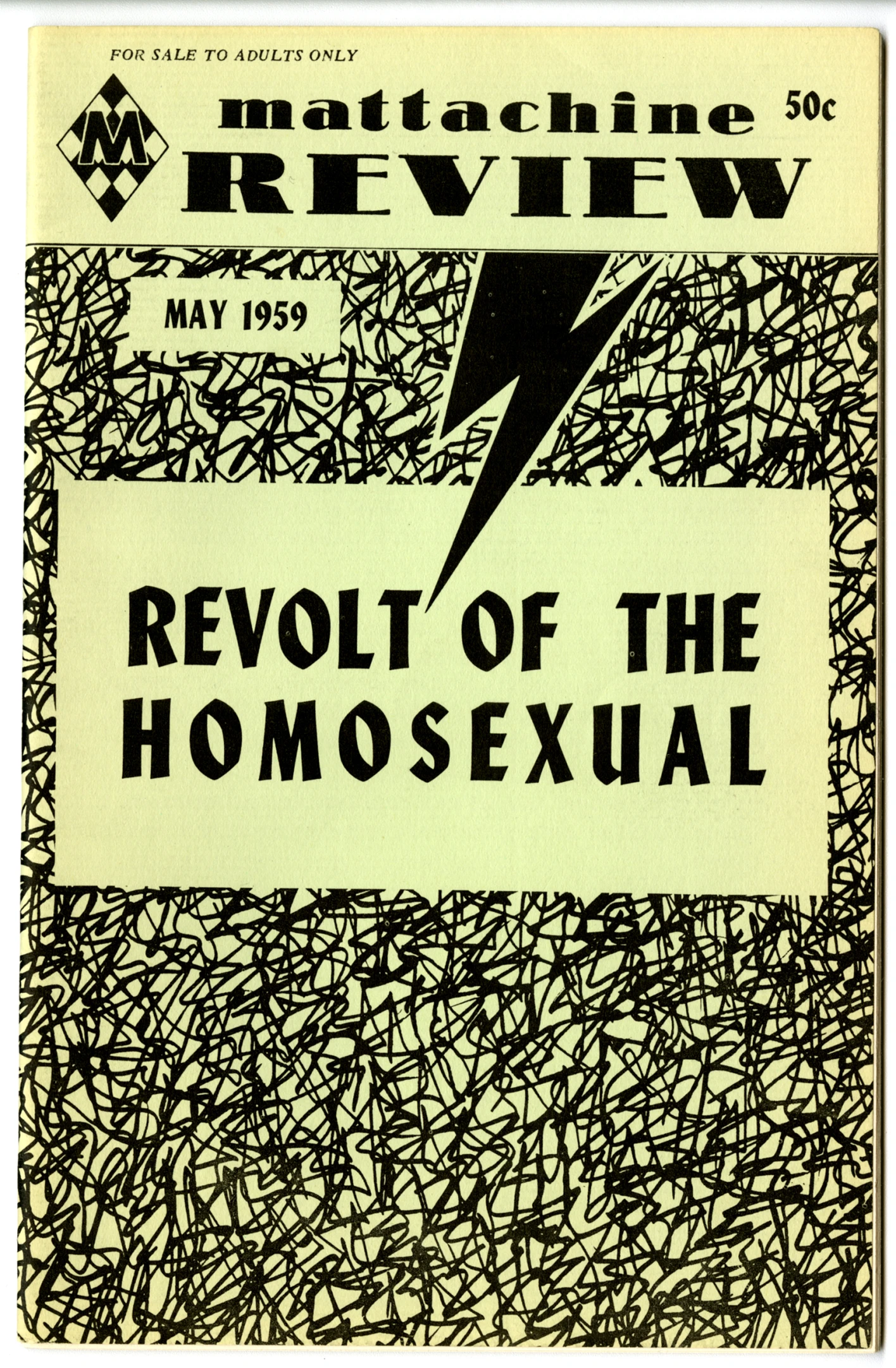
- The May 1959 issue of the Mattachine Review, an American LGBT magazine
- Formation: 1950
- Purpose: Civil and political rights for homosexual men
- Headquarters: Los Angeles, California, United States
- Official language: English
- Key people: Harry Hay

The Mattachine Society (/ˈmætəʃiːn/), founded in 1950, was an early national gay rights organization in the United States, preceded by several covert and open organizations, such as Chicago's Society for Human Rights. Communist and labor activist Harry Hay formed the group with a collection of male friends in Los Angeles to protect and improve the rights of gay men. Branches formed in other cities, and by 1961 the Society had splintered into regional groups.

At the beginning of gay rights protests, news on Cuban prison work camps for homosexuals inspired Mattachine Society to organize protests at the United Nations and the White House in 1965.

== Name ==
The Mattachine Society was named by Harry Hay at the suggestion of James Gruber, inspired by a French medieval and renaissance masque group he had studied while preparing a course on the history of popular music for a workers' education project. In a 1976 interview with Jonathan Ned Katz, Hay was asked the origin of the name Mattachine. He mentioned the medieval-Renaissance French Sociétés Joyeuses:

One masque group was known as the "Société Mattachine." These societies, lifelong secret fraternities of unmarried townsmen who never performed in public unmasked, were dedicated to going out into the countryside and conducting dances and rituals during the Feast of Fools, at the Vernal Equinox. Sometimes these dance rituals, or masques, were peasant protests against oppression—with the maskers, in the people's name, receiving the brunt of a given lord's vicious retaliation. So we took the name Mattachine because we felt that we 1950s Gays were also a masked people, unknown and anonymous, who might become engaged in morale building and helping ourselves and others, through struggle, to move toward total redress and change.

— Jonathan Katz, Gay American History. Crowell Publishers, 1976.

This French group was named in turn after Mattaccino (or the Anglicized Mattachino), a character in Italian theater. Mattaccino was a kind of court jester, who would speak the truth to the king when nobody else would. The "mattachin" (from Arabic متوجهين mutawajjihin, "mask-wearers") were originally Moorish (Hispano-Arab) sword-dancers who wore elaborate, colorful costumes and masks.

The Mattachine Society used so-called harlequin diamonds as their emblem. The design consisted of four diamonds arranged in a pattern to form a larger diamond.

== Foundation ==
Harry Hay conceived the idea of a gay activist group in 1948. After signing a petition for Progressive Party presidential candidate Henry A. Wallace, Hay spoke with other gay men at a party about forming a gay support organization for him called "Bachelors for Wallace". Encouraged by the response he received, Hay wrote the organizing principles that night, a document he referred to as "The Call". However, the men who had been interested at the party were less than enthusiastic the following morning.

Over the next two years, Hay refined his idea, finally conceiving of an "international... fraternal order" to serve as "a service and welfare organization devoted to the protection and improvement of Society's Androgynous Minority". He planned to call this organization "Bachelors Anonymous" and envisioned it serving a similar function and purpose as Alcoholics Anonymous. Hay met Rudi Gernreich in July 1950. The two became partners, (Note: Hay and Gernreich were together until 1952, when Gernreich ended the relationship.) and Hay showed Gernreich The Call. Gernreich, declaring the document "the most dangerous thing [he had] ever read", became an enthusiastic financial supporter of the venture, although he did not lend his name to it (going instead by the initial "R"). Finally on November 11, 1950, Hay, along with Gernreich and friends Dale Jennings and partners Bob Hull and Chuck Rowland, held the first meeting of the Mattachine Society in Los Angeles, under the name Society of Fools. James Gruber and Konrad Stevens joined the Society in April 1951 and they are generally considered to be original members. Also that month the group changed its name to Mattachine Society, a name suggested by Gruber and chosen by Hay, after Medieval French secret societies of masked men who, through their anonymity, were empowered to criticize ruling monarchs with impunity.

Members of the Mattachine Society in a rare group photograph. Pictured are Harry Hay (upper left), then (l–r) Konrad Stevens, Dale Jennings, Rudi Gernreich, Stan Witt, Bob Hull, Chuck Rowland (in glasses), Paul Bernard. Photo by James Gruber.

As Hay became more involved in his Mattachine work, he correspondingly became more concerned that his orientation would negatively affect the Communist Party USA, of which he was an ardent member. The CPUSA was - like most other organizations in the US at the time - officially anti-homosexual: barring gays and lesbians from membership and declaring that "homosexuality was a result of the degeneracy of a decadent capitalist system". Hay himself approached party leaders and recommended his own expulsion. The party decided to expel him as a "security risk", but declared him a "Lifelong Friend of the People" in recognition of his previous work for the party.

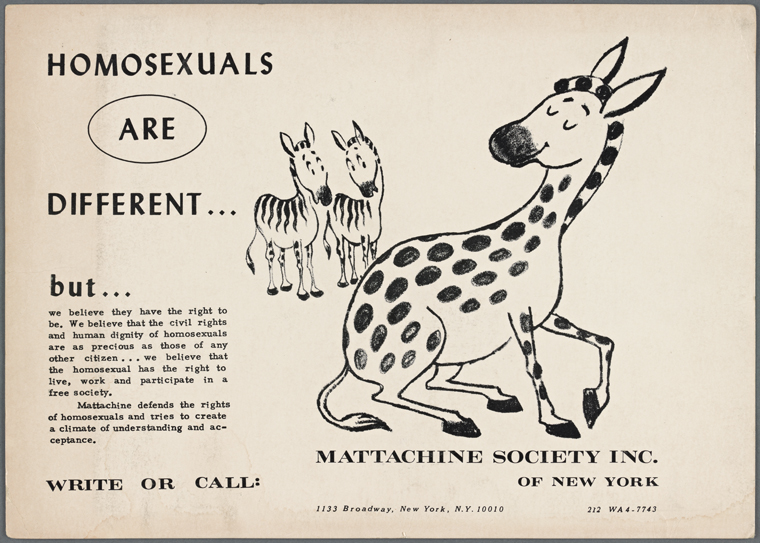
A 1960 promotional poster for the Mattachine Society

Mattachine was originally organized in similar structure to the Communist Party, with cells, oaths of secrecy and five different levels of membership, each of which required greater levels of involvement and commitment. As the organization grew, the levels were expected to subdivide into new cells, creating both the potential for horizontal and vertical growth. The founding members constituted the so-called "Fifth Order" and from the outset remained anonymous. The primary goals of the society were to

1. "Unify homosexuals isolated from their own kind";
2. "Educate homosexuals and heterosexuals toward an ethical homosexual culture paralleling the cultures of the Negro, Mexican and Jewish peoples";
3. "Lead the more socially conscious homosexual to provide leadership to the whole mass of social variants"; and
4. "Assist gays who are victimized daily as a result of oppression".

Mattachine's membership grew slowly at first but received a major boost in February 1952 when founder Jennings was arrested in a Los Angeles park and charged with lewd behavior. Often, men in Jennings' situation would simply plead guilty to the charge and hope to quietly rebuild their lives. Jennings and the rest of the Fifth Order saw the charges as a means to address the issue of police entrapment of homosexual men. The group began publicizing the case (under the name "Citizens Committee to Outlaw Entrapment") and the publicity it generated brought in financial support and volunteers. Jennings admitted during his trial to being a homosexual but insisted he was not guilty of the specific charge. The jury deadlocked and Mattachine declared victory.

== Affiliations ==
Most of the Mattachine founders were communists. As the Red Scare progressed, the association with communism concerned some members as well as supporters and Hay, a dedicated member of the CPUSA for 15 years, stepped down as the Society's leader. Others were similarly ousted, and the leadership structure became influenced less by communism, replaced by a moderate ideology similar to that espoused by the liberal reformist civil rights organizations that existed for African Americans.

The Mattachine Society existed as a single national organization headquartered first in Los Angeles and then, beginning around 1956, in San Francisco. Outside of Los Angeles and San Francisco, chapters were established in New York; Washington, D.C.; Chicago; and other locales. Due to internal disagreements, the national organization disbanded in 1961. The San Francisco national chapter retained the name "Mattachine Society", while the New York chapter became "Mattachine Society of New York, Inc" and was commonly known by its acronym MSNY. Other independent groups using the name Mattachine were formed in Washington, D.C. (Mattachine Society of Washington, 1961), in Chicago (Mattachine Midwest, 1965), and in Buffalo (Mattachine Society of the Niagara Frontier, 1970). In 1963 Congressman John Dowdy introduced a bill which resulted in congressional hearings to revoke the license for solicitation of funds of the Mattachine Society of Washington; the license was not revoked.

A largely amicable split within the national Society in 1952 resulted in a new organization called ONE, Inc. ONE admitted women and, together with Mattachine, provided help to the Daughters of Bilitis in the launching of that group's magazine, The Ladder, in 1956. The Daughters of Bilitis were an independent lesbian organization who occasionally worked with the predominantly male Mattachine Society.

The Janus Society grew out of lesbian and gay activists meeting regularly, beginning in 1961, in hopes of forming a Mattachine Society chapter. The group was not officially recognized as such a chapter, however, and so instead named itself the Janus Society of Delaware Valley. In 1964 they renamed themselves the Janus Society of America due to their increasing national visibility.

In January 1962 East Coast Homophile Organizations (ECHO) was established, with its formative membership including the Mattachine Society chapters in New York and Washington D.C., the Janus Society, and the Daughters of Bilitis chapter in New York. ECHO was meant to facilitate cooperation between homophile organizations and outside administrations. In 1964, ECHO secured a $500 settlement from the Manger Hamilton hotel, following the abrupt cancellation of ECHO's conference at the hotel. This out-of-court resolution was presented by Frank Kameny as a clear message to the homophile community – a demonstration that they would not tolerate interference, and any infringements on their rights would be addressed through legal means.

On the eve of January 1, 1965, several homophile organizations in San Francisco, California—including Mattachine, the Daughters of Bilitis, the Council on Religion and the Homosexual, and the Society for Individual Rights—held a fund-raising ball for their mutual benefit at California Hall on Polk Street. San Francisco police had agreed not to interfere; however, on the evening of the ball, the police surrounded the building and focused numerous Klieg lights on its entrance. As each of the 600 plus persons entering the ball approached the entrance, the police took their photographs. Police vans were parked in plain view near the entrance to the ball. Evander Smith, a (gay) lawyer for the groups organizing the ball, and gay lawyer Herb Donaldson tried to stop the police from conducting the fourth "inspection" of the evening; both were arrested, along with two heterosexual lawyers—Elliott Leighton and Nancy May—who were supporting the rights of the participants to gather at the ball. But twenty-five of the most prominent lawyers in San Francisco joined the defense team for the four lawyers, and the judge directed the jury to find the four not-guilty before the defense had even had a chance to begin their argumentation when the case came to court. This event has been called "San Francisco's Stonewall" by some historians; the participation of such prominent litigators in the defense of Smith, Donaldson and the other two lawyers marked a turning point in gay rights on the West Coast of the United States.

== Political shift ==
Following the Jennings trial, the group expanded rapidly, with founders estimating membership in California by May 1953 at over 2,000 with as many as 100 people joining a typical discussion group. Membership diversified, with more women and people from a broader political spectrum becoming involved. With that growth came concern about the radical left slant of the organization. In particular, Hal Call and others out of San Francisco along with Ken Burns from Los Angeles wanted Mattachine to amend its constitution to clarify its opposition to so-called "subversive elements" and to affirm that members were loyal to the United States and its laws (which declared homosexuality illegal). In an effort to preserve their vision of the organization, the Fifth Order members revealed their identities and resigned their leadership positions at Mattachine's May 1953 convention. With the founders gone, Call, Burns and other like-minded individuals stepped into the leadership void, and Mattachine officially adopted non-confrontation as an organizational policy. Some historians argue that these changes reduced the effectiveness of this newly organized Mattachine and led to a precipitous drop in membership and participation. Other historians contend that the Mattachine Society between 1953 and 1966 was enormously effective as it published a magazine, developed relationships with allies in the fight for homosexual equality, and influenced public opinion on the topic too.

== Mattachine Review ==
The Mattachine Review was a magazine published by the Mattachine Society from 1955 to 1966. Hall was the founder and editor of the Review. In contrast to the anonymity of the Fifth Order, Call centered publishing and media outreach when leading the Mattachine Society. Indeed, the Mattachine Review would achieve a nation-wide base of readers, well in excess of the contemporary membership numbers of the Mattachine Society itself. It reached its historic peak of circulation in 1960, with 3,000 copies sold that year.

The various regional branches of the Mattachine Society also published regional newsletters and periodicals, separate from the Mattachine Review.

== Decline ==
During the 1960s, the various unaffiliated Mattachine Societies, especially the Mattachine Society in San Francisco and MSNY, were among the foremost gay rights groups in the United States, but beginning in the middle 1960s and, especially, following the Stonewall riots of 1969, they began increasingly to be seen as too traditional, and not willing enough to be confrontational. Like the divide that occurred within the Civil Rights Movement, the late 1960s and the 1970s brought a new generation of activists, many of whom felt that the gay rights movement needed to endorse a larger and more radical agenda to address other forms of oppression, the Vietnam War, and the sexual revolution. Several unaffiliated entities that went under the name Mattachine eventually lost support or fell prey to internal division.

In 1967 the Mattachine Society "functionally ceased to exist".

In 1973 Hal Call opened the Cinemattachine, a venue showing both Mattachine newsreels and pornographic movies. The Cinemattachine was an extension of the Mattachine Society's Sex Education Film Series and branded as being presented by both The Mattachine Society and The Seven Committee. In 1976 a venue with the name Cinemattachine Los Angeles at the ONE opened. The same screenings as the San Francisco establishment were shown there. Mattachine co-founder Chuck Rowland indicated that he did not feel that Call associating this venue with The Mattachine Society was appropriate.

== Legacy ==
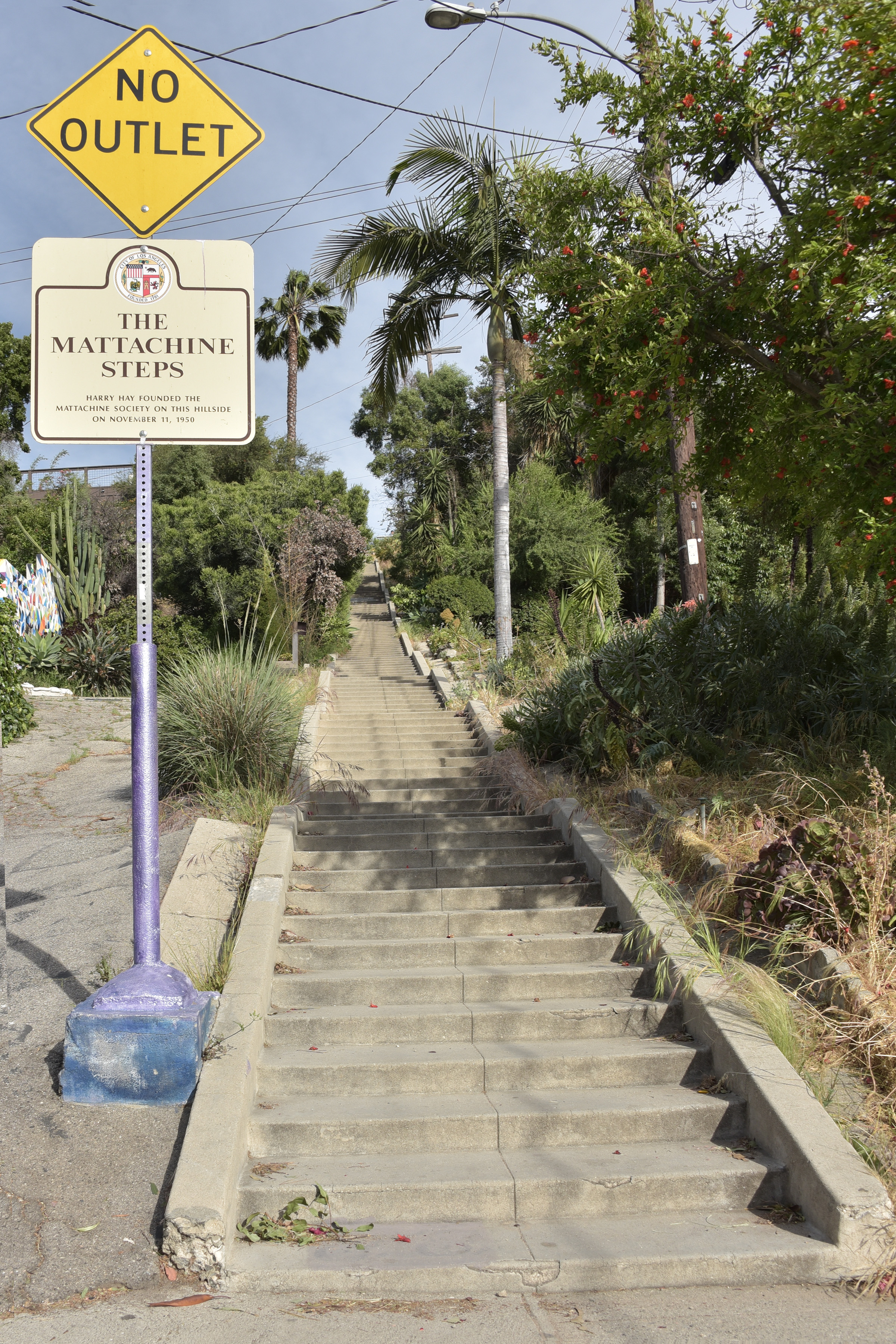
The Mattachine Steps in 2017.

In the Quantum Leap comic book titled Up Against a Stonewall (1992), the Mattachine Society and the Daughters of Bilitis are mentioned as two groups campaigning for LGBT rights prior to the Stonewall riots.

The 1995 film Stonewall included members of the Mattachine Society of New York among its characters. Mattachine members are seen leafleting, attending meetings and participating in the Annual Reminder picket in Philadelphia. However, the film sets the Reminder earlier in the summer than it really was, predating the June 28 Stonewall riots.

In 2002 Mattachine Midwest was inducted into the Chicago Gay and Lesbian Hall of Fame.

In 2009 the Mattachine Society and its founders became the subjects of the play The Temperamentals by Jon Marans. After workshop performances in 2009, the play opened Off-Broadway at New World Stages in early 2010. The Temperamentals received a Drama Desk Award for Best Ensemble Cast. Michael Urie, who originated the role of Rudi Gernreich, received a Lucille Lortel Award for Outstanding Lead Actor.

A new Mattachine Society of Washington, D.C. was formed in 2011 and is dedicated to original archival research of LGBT political history.

The Playboy Club, a 2011 television series on NBC, includes a lesbian Playboy Bunny in a lavender marriage with a gay man. The two are members of the Chicago Mattachine chapter.

The Mattachine Steps, also known as the Cove Avenue stairway, is an outdoor staircase in Silver Lake, Los Angeles, dedicated to the Mattachine Society in 2012 in memory of its founder Harry Hay.

In 2015, a gay bar called Bar Mattachine opened in downtown Los Angeles. The podcast "Making Gay History" (season 1, episode 7) is about Mattachine co-founder Chuck Rowland, and another episode is about Mattachine co-founder Harry Hay (season 4, episode 3).

Julius’ bar in Manhattan has held a monthly party called "Mattachine" honoring the early gay rights pioneers.

The 2018 TV series The Bletchley Circle: San Francisco, episodes 4 and 5, mention the Mattachine Society as part of the story about corrupt police, drug dealers, and gay men using secret codes in newspaper advertisements to communicate meeting places and times.

== See also ==
- Dick Leitsch
- LGBT rights in the United States
- List of LGBT rights organizations
- Radical Faeries
- Timeline of LGBT history
