= Empire Savings Bank =

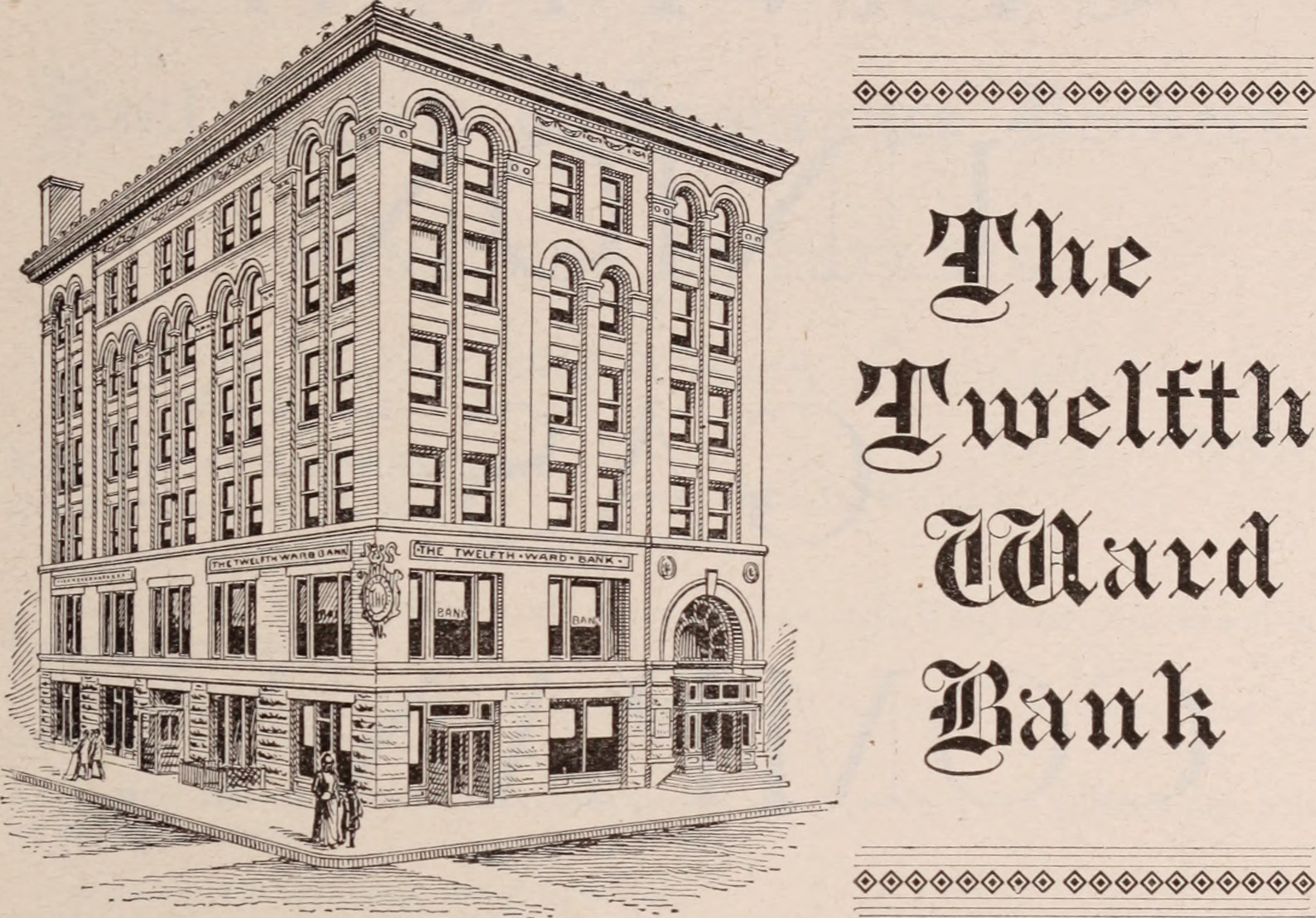
Twelfth Ward Savings Bank, in East Harlem, a predecessor

Empire Savings Bank was formed as the result of a merger between Excelsior Savings Bank and Empire City Savings Bank in 1967. It was declared insolvent in 1990, and had 125 branches in New York, California, Florida, Michigan, and Texas, making it the 12th-largest bank in the United States in 1989. It was said that its problems were caused by the purchase of several insolvent banks during the 1980s —including Atlas Savings and Loan Association— from the support of federal regulators. In 1992 it was sold to Ridgewood Savings Bank and liquidated in 1995.

== See also ==
- Savings and loan crisis
- List of largest bank failures in the United States
- Ridgewood Savings Bank
