= Timeline of LGBTQ history in New York City =

New York has a long history of LGBTQ community building, activism, and culture which extends to the early history of the city.

== Timeline of events ==
1890s
Manhattan's Bowery was known to host "fairy resorts", saloons or dance halls for male gays, (known as fairies at the time). These 'resorts' included the venues: Paresis Hall, Little Bucks, Manilla Hall, the Palm Club of Chrystie Street, the Black Rabbit at 183 Bleecker Street, and The Slide at 157 Bleecker Street were the site of many gay and drag queen performers gaining recognition as entertainers in New York. The 1890s gay scene in the Bowery was described by Earl Lind in her autobiography, Autobiography of an Androgyne, published in two volumes in 1919 and 1922.

1924
God of Vengeance (1907), written by Sholem Asch opens as the first commercially produced play on Broadway with a lesbian theme. Soon after, the theatre owner and the entire cast of 12 was arrested and found guilty of obscenity.

1926
Police raid on Eve's Hangout on June 11 results in its closure. Its owner, Eva Kotchever, was arrested, found guilty of obscenity and deported to Europe. She was assassinated at Auschwitz during World War II.

1927
The New York State Assembly amends a public-obscenity code to include a ban of depictions of gayness onstage in what is called 'the padlock bill.'

1939
New York City closes most of the city's best-known gay bars in preparation for the 1939 New York World's Fair.

1940
Courts rule New York State Liquor Authority can legally close down bars that serve "sex variants."

1945
After many LGBT personnel were discharged from military service during World War II, the Quaker Emergency Committee of New York City opens the first social welfare agency for gay people, serving young people arrested on same-sex charges. The group was disbanded in 1954 because of disagreement whether its goals were to 'cure' LGBT persons or to assist them with more basic social and welfare needs.

1956
New York Author James Baldwin publishes the novel Giovanni's Room, which features a gay male narrator. The book was well received by critics.

1962
The first known pro-LGBT radio program, a 90-minute special with Randy Wicker airs on the station, WBAI in New York City.

1967
April 21: New York decides that it can no longer forbid bars from serving gay men and lesbians after activists stage a "Sip-In" at Julius, a bar.

1967
Craig Rodwell opens the Oscar Wilde Memorial Bookshop, the first gay bookstore in the U.S., in Greenwich Village.

1969

- Saturday 28 June – Stonewall riots
- In November Craig Rodwell, Fred Sargaent, Ellen Broidy, and Linda Rhodes proposed the first gay Pride parade to be held in New York City by way of a resolution at the Eastern Regional Conference of Homophile Organizations. The parade was originally named "Christopher Street Liberation Day." It was held Sunday, June 28, 1970.

1970
Gay “zaps” were first used against New York City Mayor John Lindsay.

1971
The Gay & Lesbian Switchboard of New York is founded.

1972

- The Ithaca Statement on Bisexuality, sparked by Stephen Donaldson a.k.a. Donny the Punk, came out of the annual national gathering of Quakers, Friends General Conference, and was published in The Advocate. It "was certainly the first statement on bisexuality issued by an American religious assembly" and led to an ongoing organization, the Committee of Friends on Bisexuality.
- The National Bisexual Liberation Group first forms in New York. The group issued the first bisexual newsletter, The Bisexual Expression.
- Parents & Friends of Lesbians and Gays (PFLAG) is founded in New York after cofounder Jeanne Manford held a sign in the Christopher Street Liberation Day Parade. The sign read; “Parents of gays: unite in support of our children", in support of her openly gay son, Morty.
- The Metropolitan Community Church, an LGBT Christian Church, opened on West 36th Street.

1973

The Lesbian Herstory Archives is founded by members of the Gay Academic Union, and hosted in Joan Nestle's Upper West Side apartment.

1980

- November 19: An armed man targeting gay bars kills two and wounds six in Greenwich Village.

1981

- January 15: Nick Rock becomes first known AIDS death in New York City.
- July 3: The New York Times publishes the first news article about AIDS.

1982

- Gay Men's Health Crisis is founded.
- By 1982, there had been 272 cumulative deaths by AIDS in New York.

1983

- By 1983, there had been 860 cumulative deaths by AIDS in New York.

1984

- By 1984, there had been 1,969 cumulative deaths by AIDS in New York.

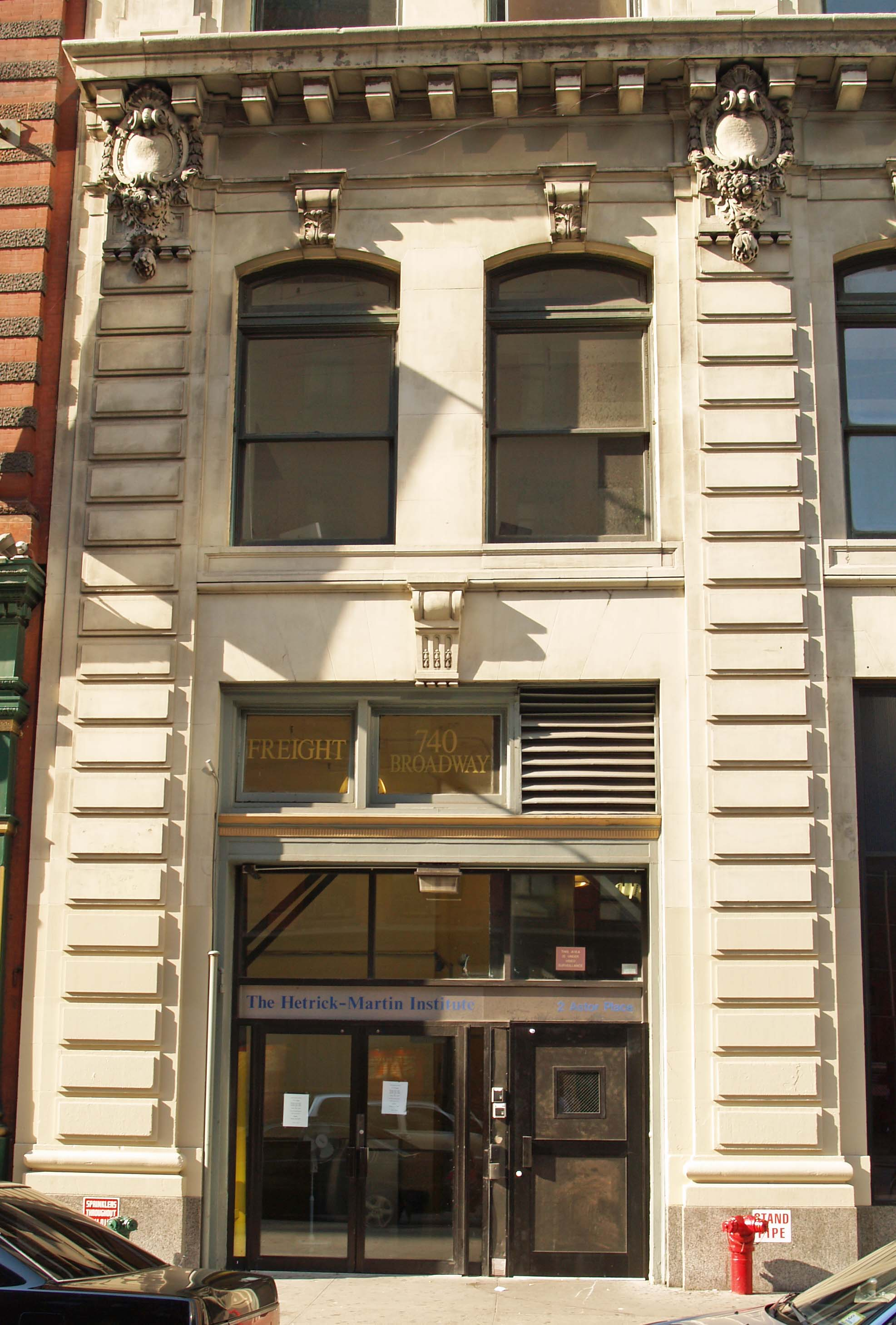
Harvey Milk High School entrance

1985

- The first school for openly lesbian and gay teenagers opens in New York City, Harvey Milk High School.
- By 1985, there had been 3,798 cumulative deaths by AIDS in New York.

1986

- By 1986, there had been 6,505 cumulative deaths by AIDS in New York.

1987

- ACT UP (the AIDS Coalition to Unleash Power) is founded in New York City at the Lesbian, Gay, Bisexual & Transgender Community Center.
- BiNet USA, an organization which develops Bisexual community resources and educational information was founded. BiNet is the oldest national bisexuality organization in the United States.
- By 1987, there had been 9,851 cumulative deaths by AIDS in New York.

1988

- The New York Lesbian, Gay, Bisexual, & Transgender Film Festival first premieres.
- By 1988, there had been 14,144 cumulative deaths by AIDS in New York.

1989

- By 1989, there had been 19,492 cumulative deaths by AIDS in New York.

2011

- July 24: Same-sex marriage in New York becomes legal under the Marriage Equality Act (New York) passed by the New York State Legislature.

2013

- May 18: Mark Carson, a gay man, was murdered in Greenwich Village, prompting a rally to protest both his killing and a recent uptick in violence against LGBTQ people in New York City

2015

- J. Christopher Neal became the first openly bisexual New York City LGBT Pride March Grand Marshal.

2016

- Hillary Clinton became the first presumptive presidential nominee from any major party to march in the New York City LGBT Pride March.

2018

- Peppermint made her Broadway debut in The Go-Go's-inspired musical Head Over Heels. The show began previews on June 23, 2018, and officially opened July 26; playing the role of Pythio, Peppermint became the first trans woman to originate a principal role on Broadway.

== See also ==
- LGBTQ culture in New York City
- Timeline of LGBTQ history in the United States
