= Murder of Mark Carson =

2013 murder in New York City, US

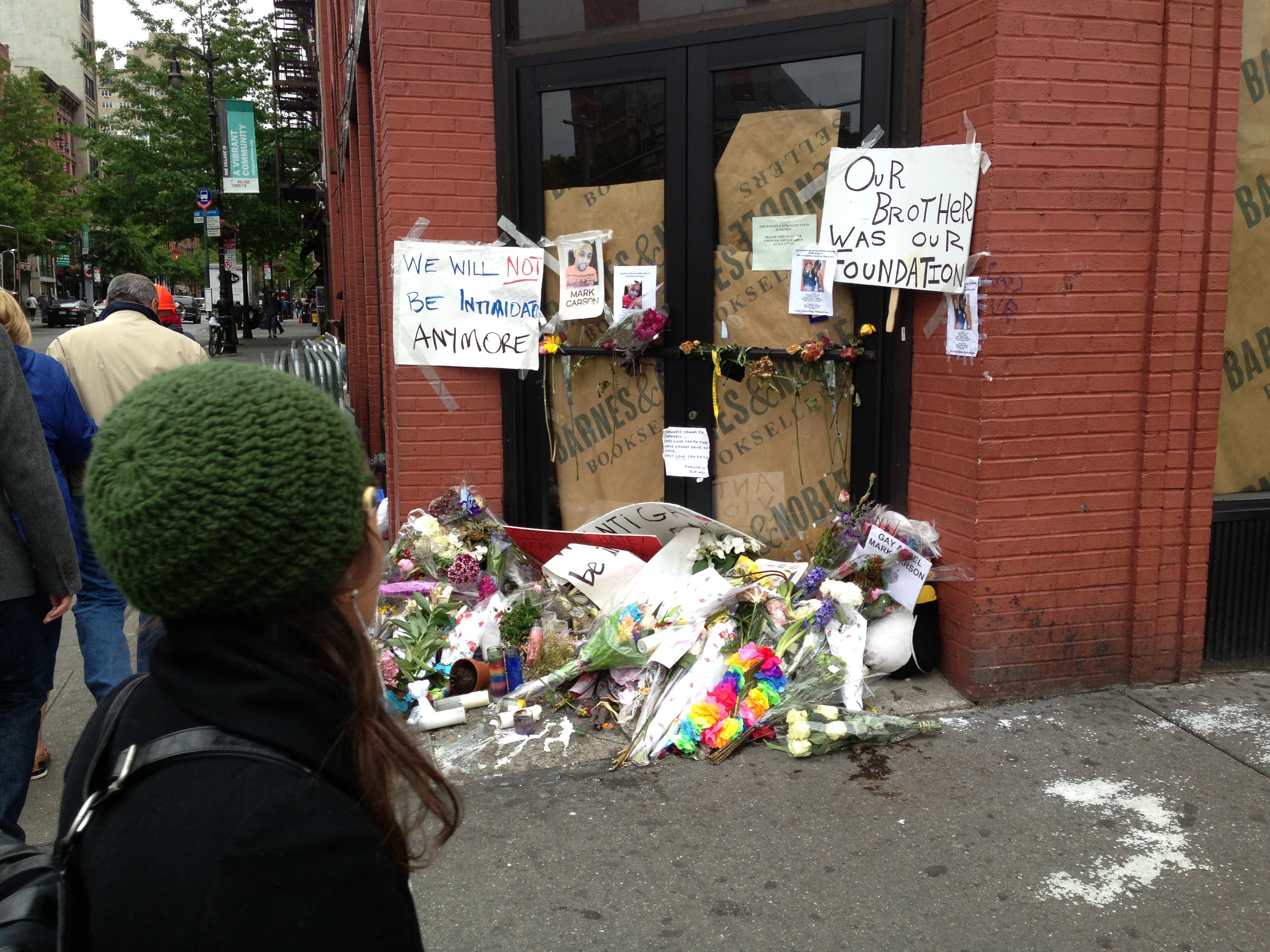
- Memorial for Mark Carson at the site of his murder, May 25, 2013
- Location: 40°44′01″N 73°59′58″W; Greenwich Village, New York City, United States
- Date: May 18, 2013; Shortly after midnight
- Attack type: Shooting
- Weapon: Taurus Armas .38 caliber revolver
- Deaths: 1
- Victim: Mark Carson
- Perpetrator: Elliot Morales
- Motive: Gay bashing
- Coroner: Candace Schoppe (medical examiner)
- Charges: Second-degree murder with a hate crime designation
- Verdict: Guilty
- Convictions: Second-degree murder with a hate crime designation
- Judge: Charles Solomon; A. Kirke Bartley Jr. (sentencing)

On May 18, 2013, Mark Carson was fatally shot in the Greenwich Village neighborhood of New York City by Elliot Morales. Morales was arrested shortly after the shooting and charged with second-degree murder with a hate crime designation. In March 2016, he was found guilty and in June was given a sentence of 40 years to life in prison.

Carson was a 32-year-old openly gay African American man who was in Greenwich Village with a friend. On the night he was murdered, Morales was also in the neighborhood. Morales had consumed a significant amount of alcohol and engaged in a verbal altercation with the staff at a nearby restaurant that included the use of homophobic slurs and threatening to kill them with a handgun. After leaving the restaurant, he encountered Carson and directed homophobic slurs towards him and his friend. After a brief exchange between the three, Morales pulled out his handgun and shot Carson in the head, killing him instantly. Morales was arrested shortly thereafter.

In the subsequent trial, in which Morales represented himself, the prosecution alleged that Morales had murdered Carson because of his appearance and because Morales believed him to be gay. Morales denied this, saying instead that he had acted in self-defense after he believed that Carson was pulling out a handgun. However, Carson was unarmed at the time of the encounter. Additionally, Morales claimed that he was not homophobic, in part because he himself was bisexual. He was ultimately found guilty of committing a hate crime, with the sentencing judge comparing the murder to the Pulse nightclub shooting.

The killing drew widespread media attention, with multiple news sources pointing out that the shooting occurred a short distance from the Stonewall Inn. Prior to Morales's conviction, both New York City Mayor Michael Bloomberg and Police Commissioner Raymond Kelly held a press conference to discuss the event, with both individuals calling it a hate crime. Additionally, a few days after his death, a rally was held in Greenwich Village to protest both Carson's death and a general uptick in anti-LGBTQ violence in the city.

== Background ==
=== People involved ===
==== Mark Carson ====
Mark Anthony Carson Jr. (February 1, 1981 - May 18, 2013) was an African American man who was 32 years old at the time of the incident. He lived in Brooklyn and was a manager at a gelato kiosk in Grand Central Terminal. Carson was an openly gay man. He frequently visited the Greenwich Village neighborhood of Manhattan, often engaging in the nightlife in the area. On the night that he was killed, he was in the neighborhood with his roommate, Danny Robinson.

==== Elliot Morales ====
Elliot Morales was a 33-year-old man at the time of the incident. Originally from the Lower East Side of Manhattan, he was at the time living with a friend in Queens. According to multiple news sources, Morales had an extensive criminal record. He had previously served an 11-year prison term for a robbery wherein three women had been bound and assaulted. He was convicted in 1999. By May 2013, he was out of prison but was unemployed and poor.

Following the killing, Morales stated that he was bisexual and had had sexual relationships with a trans woman. However, earlier, he had told police that he was straight.

=== Increase in anti-LGBTQ violence in New York City ===
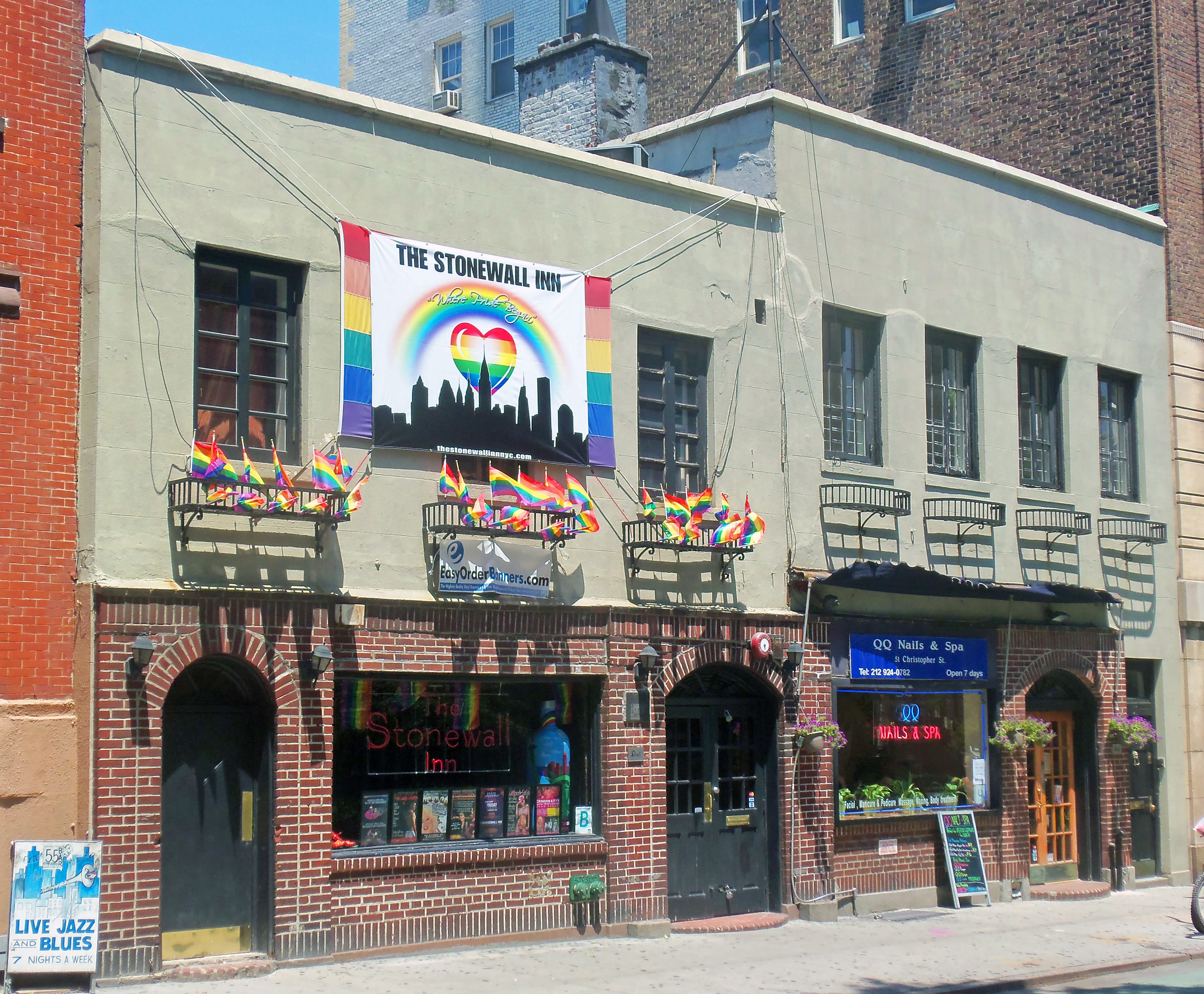
The Stonewall Inn in Greenwich Village, pictured 2012

In the 2010s, Greenwich Village had a reputation as one of the most progressive neighborhoods in New York City and was considered the most gay-friendly neighborhood in both the city and the country. Specifically, the West Village area of Greenwich Village is considered the birthplace of the modern gay rights movement, which began at the Stonewall Inn with the 1969 Stonewall riots.

In the year preceding Carson's killing, there had been only one homicide reported in Greenwich Village. However, in 2013, there were 60 assaults reported in the neighborhood, which represented about twice the number that occurred the previous year. Additionally, in late May 2013, New York City Police Commissioner Raymond Kelly said that there had been 22 bias-related crimes in New York City up to that point in the year, compared to a total of 13 during the same time period in 2012. A non-profit group also reported that 2011 and 2012 saw an increase in attacks on LGBTQ people of 13 percent and 11 percent, respectively. In the three weeks leading up to Carson's death, there had been four attacks on gay men in the city.

== Shooting ==
=== Prior incidents that night ===
On the night of Friday, May 17, 2013, about 15 minutes before the encounter between Morales and Carson, Morales and two of his friends were socializing in Manhattan. Morales later said that in the eight hours leading up to the encounter, he had consumed six Four Loko drinks and four tumblers of rum. Per later police reports, Morales engaged in public urination outside of a restaurant in the West Village. (Note: The restaurant was Anissa, a lesbian-owned upscale restaurant.) After an employee chastised him, he entered the establishment and directed anti-gay slurs at a bartender. Morales then revealed that he had a handgun—a silver Taurus Armas .38 caliber revolver—in a shoulder holster concealed by his sweatshirt and threatened to kill the bartender if he called the police. That same night, he had an altercation with a bouncer at a nightclub, telling him that he had been the killer involved in the Sandy Hook Elementary School shooting.

=== Interaction between Carson and Morales ===
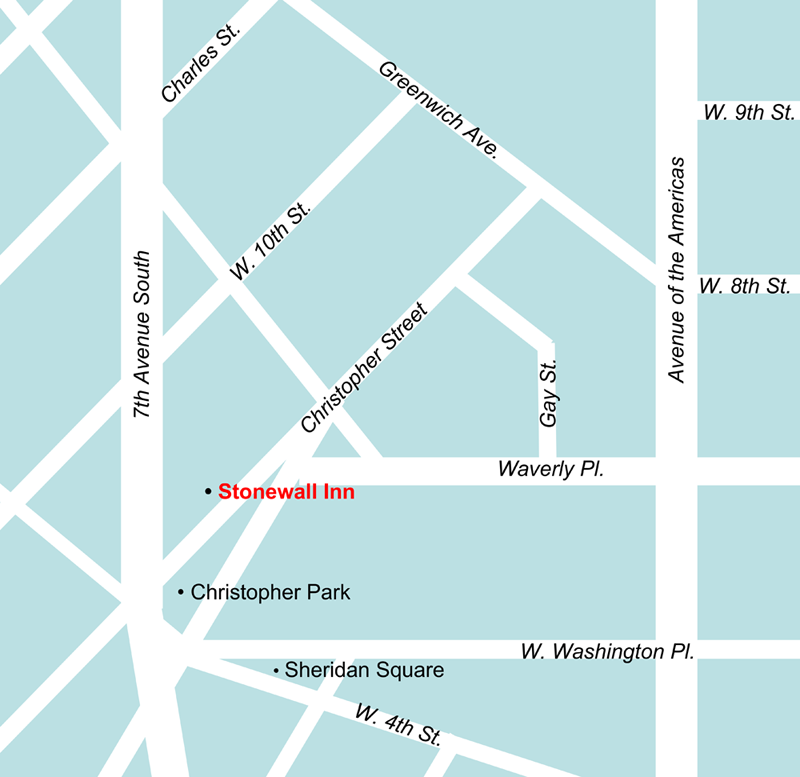
The shooting occurred at the intersection of Eighth Street and Sixth Avenue (Avenue of the Americas).

That same night, Carson and Robinson were also in the West Village. At around midnight, they were walking down Sixth Avenue towards Eighth Street, where Carson was planning to meet with another friend at a restaurant. While walking, they were passed on the sidewalk by Morales, who began to say anti-gay slurs towards the two, calling them "faggots" and saying that they looked like "gay wrestlers". While Morales's friends were initially present as well, they departed from Morales shortly after his initial statements. According to gay rights activist Richard Socarides, Carson was targeted based on his attire—boots, cut-off shorts, and a tank top—which had led Morales to believe that Carson was gay.

In a later statement to police, Robinson said that he and Carson walked to Morales and asked him what he meant by the comments. A witness to the event said that a friend of Carson's asked Morales, "Oh yeah? Well, what do you look like?". Robinson said that Carson was very upset by the statements and did much of the talking to Morales. Morales then asked the two, "You all want problems?", and proceeded to follow them towards Eighth Street. Robinson later said that Morales enticed them around a street corner. Once there, he asked them, "Do you want to die right now?" Robinson asked Morales, "Do you want to shoot us in front of all these people?" and took out his mobile phone, calling the police.

Morales then asked Carson if he is with Robinson, to which Carson said yes. At that point, shortly after midnight on May 18, Morales shot Carson. The bullet, fired from point-blank range and struck Carson in his cheek. Carson was rushed to the nearby Beth Israel Hospital, where he was pronounced dead on arrival. According to a later analysis by medical examiner Dr. Candace Schoppe, the bullet had bounced off of Carson's skull and partially severed his brainstem, causing irreparable damage. The encounter was captured on a nearby security camera.

=== Arrest ===
Shortly after the shooting, Morales fled from the crime scene, threatening a witness to the crime. A nearby police officer asked him to stop, prompting Morales to point his gun at the officer. A police chase ensued and Morales was arrested at the intersection of West Third Street and MacDougal Street. Police found a fake ID on his person. While Morales refused to identify himself or allow himself to be fingerprinted, both Robinson and the bartender that Morales had threatened earlier in the night identified him as the shooter.

According to reporting from the New York Daily News, while he was being arrested, Morales laughed and bragged about shooting Carson, saying, "I shot him in the face". According to later court documents, Morales also said of Carson during his arrest, "It's the last thing he'll remember". Additionally, he said, "Guy thought he was tough in front of his bitch, so I shot him. Diagnosis is dead, doctor.", before sticking his tongue out. He was jailed at Rikers Island.

== Reactions ==
The killing was the first homicide reported in the West Village that year. Multiple news sources commented on how close the crime occurred to the Stonewall Inn, (Note: Multiple news sources highlighted the proximity of the crime scene to the inn, including The Advocate, the Associated Press, The Atlantic, The Guardian, the New York Daily News, The New York Times, and The New Yorker.) which was located less than 0.25 miles (0.40 km) from the scene.

The tragedy of Carson's death is a reminder that anti-gay bigotry and discrimination still exist everywhere, including in places where such things are not supposed to happen. The gunman, who was quickly apprehended, may turn out to be deranged or even mad. But his anti-gay rants and accusations that evening, right before and during the fatal assault—and documented by the fast-moving police investigations—made clear what was in his head.

— Richard Socarides, discussing the killing in an opinion piece for The New Yorker

Gay rights activist Richard Socarides wrote an opinion piece in The New Yorker about the killing, using it as evidence that, despite gains made by the LGBTQ community over the past few years, such as the recent conclusion of the court case United States v. Windsor, homophobia was still a danger in American society. Journalist Maya Dusenbery echoed these sentiments in an article in The Atlantic, saying that the killing occurred during the same month that three states had legalized same-sex marriage.

Activist Darnell L. Moore wrote about the killing in an article for The Advocate titled "Black, LGBT, American", wherein he analyzed the event through the lens of intersectionality, saying that black people often lack representation in the LGBTQ community. Concerning a large rally held after Carson's death, he wrote, "While I was moved by the solidarity, I knew that if Carson hadn't been gay, 1,500 (mostly white) LGBT-supporting people would not have been out on the street protesting a black man's murder."

=== Memorials and protests ===
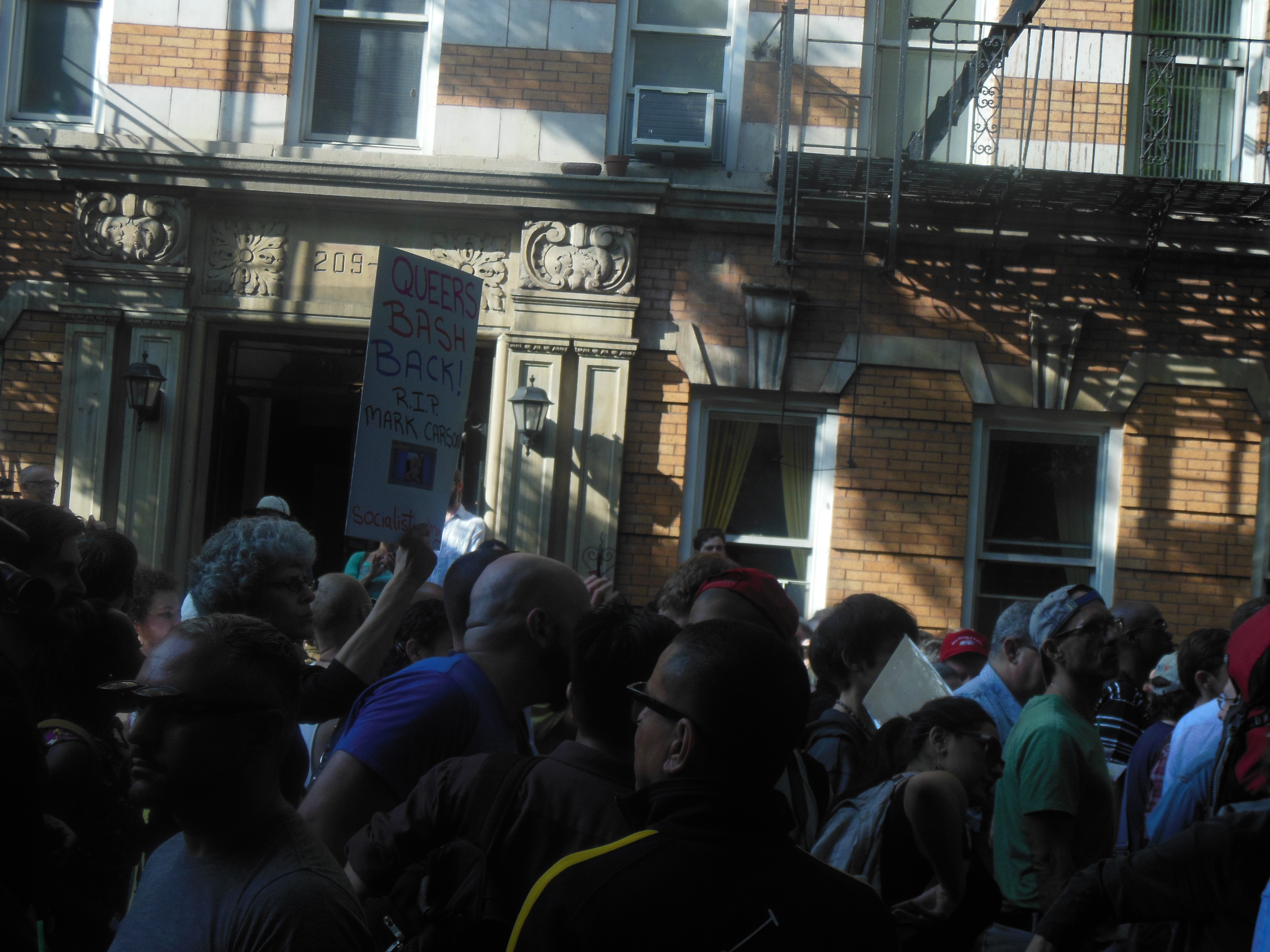
A person holds a sign during the May 20, 2013, march against anti-LGBTQ violence that reads, in part, "R.I.P. MARK CARSON".

By the evening of May 18, an impromptu memorial was created on the sidewalk where Carson was killed, consisting largely of candles and flowers. Meanwhile, a private memorial service for friends and relatives of Carson's was held at his mother's apartment in Harlem. His memorial service was held on May 29 at the Unity Funeral Chapels in Harlem.

On May 20, a march was held in the West Village in order to protest the recent string of attacks on members of the LGBTQ community. The march began at 5:30 p.m. at the Lesbian, Gay, Bisexual & Transgender Community Center on West 13th Street in the West Village and finished at the intersection of Eighth Street and Sixth Avenue. The march was coordinated by several LGBTQ rights groups, such as the community center, GLAAD, the New York City Anti-Violence Project, and the Transgender Legal Defense & Education Fund. Notable marchers included Christine Quinn (the speaker of the New York City Council) and LGBTQ rights activist Edith Windsor. Additionally, an aunt of Carson's marched in her nephew's memory. About 1,500 individuals participated in the march, which was one of a series of events, including vigils and rallies, intended to protest against the killing and the increased violence against gay people.

=== Response from public officials ===
On May 20, the New York City Police Department announced that they would be increasing their presence in Greenwich Village and the surrounding area through the end of June, which is celebrated as Pride Month in the United States.

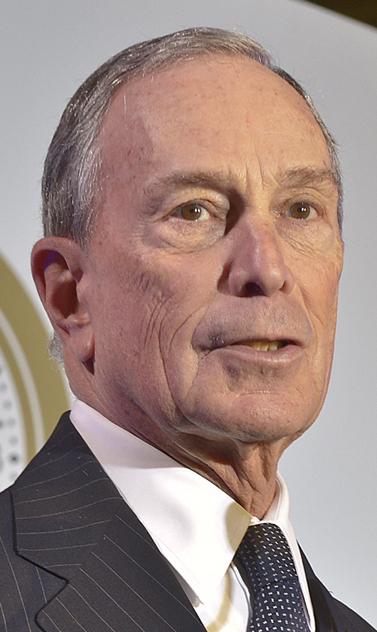
New York City Mayor Michael Bloomberg called the killing "a cold-blooded hate crime".

On May 21, New York City Mayor Michael Bloomberg and Police Commissioner Kelly held a press conference to discuss the killing. Among other things, Bloomberg told reporters,

It was a cold-blooded hate crime that cut short a life full of promise ... and brought back awful memories for people who were once afraid to walk down the street with the person that they loved. Thankfully, we have come a long way from those days ... but the murder of Mark Carson is a tragic reminder of how far we still have to go.

Kelly agreed with the mayor's statement that the act had been a hate crime, saying that the shooter only targeted Carson because he thought he was gay. New York State Senator Brad Hoylman, who represents the area in which the crime took place, and Speaker Quinn also released statements wherein they condemned the violence. GLAAD spokesperson Wilson Cruz said regarding the killing, "Until we rid our society of the discrimination that allows us to be seen as inferior and less than human, we will never truly be safe, even in one of the most accepting cities in the world."

== Legal proceedings ==
On May 19, Morales was arraigned at the Manhattan courthouse of the New York City Criminal Court. He was charged with murder in the second degree as a hate crime. He was also given a weapons-related charge, as he was accused of menacing a police officer during his arrest. The trial, which took place in Manhattan, was overseen by the New York Supreme Court. Shannon Lucey, the assistant district attorney, served as the lead prosecutor for the trial.

Morales represented himself in the case. While Judge Charles Solomon initially denied his request to do so, he was ultimately able to convince a state supreme court judge that he would be capable of representing himself, citing a paralegal course that he had completed while in prison. He had rejected four public defenders, causing considerable delays to the trial. Prior to representing himself, one of his defenders sought to invoke the insanity defense, with the presiding judge ordering Morales to undergo a psychiatric evaluation on July 30.

Testimony in the trial lasted for about two weeks, concluding on March 3. Over the course of the litigation, Morales, who pled not guilty, argued that he was not homophobic and that, while he had shot Carson, he had done so in an act of self-defense. Concerning the latter point, Morales said that he thought he was about to be attacked by Carson and Robinson and only shot Carson after seeing him bring out what he thought was a black gun. However, Carson was unarmed. While cross-examining Robinson, Morales placed the blame for the fracas that led to the shooting on Carson and Robinson, saying that the two men should have ignored his taunting. In response, Robinson said, "That is so offensive". Morales also said that he was only carrying the firearm on himself because he had planned to sell it to someone on the Lower East Side.

Concerning the accusations of homophobia, Morales said that, while he had been drinking heavily earlier in the night and had engaged in an argument with Carson and Robinson, he had not used any homophobic slurs towards the two. Furthermore, Morales said that he was bisexual, contradicting earlier court documents in which he said he identified as straight. Specifically, Morales said he was bisexual because he had previously had a sexual relationship with a trans woman, whom he called to testify. According to the Associated Press, this woman was Morales's "star witness". Despite claiming to be bisexual, the Associated Press noted that New York's hate crime laws did not require the perpetrator of the crime to be of a different sexuality than the victim. Prosecutors argued that Morales was conflicted about his own sexuality and attacked Carson in part because he was jealous of the openly gay man.

=== Verdict and sentencing ===
The jury, which consisted of eight women and four men, deliberated for about two days. On March 8, they rendered their verdict, finding him guilty of all charges. This included the charge of second-degree murder with a hate crime designation, which carries a possible sentence of life imprisonment without the possibility of parole. His sentencing was originally scheduled for April 11, but ultimately occurred on June 14. Morales was given a sentence of 40 years to life in prison. During the sentencing, Judge A. Kirk Bartley compared Morales's actions to the recent Pulse nightclub shooting in Orlando, Florida, saying, "That parallel is revealed in hate, self-loathing, fear and death". The nightclub shooting was also referenced in a statement made by Manhattan District Attorney Cyrus Vance Jr. regarding the sentencing. Morales is currently imprisoned in the Shawangunk Correctional Facility, in Shawangunk, New York.

== See also ==
- Crime in New York City
- Gun violence in the United States
- History of violence against LGBTQ people in the United States
- Timeline of LGBTQ history in New York City
