= True Love (Dawson's Creek) =

- Dawson's Creek episode
- Joey makes her decision between Pacey and Dawson.
- Episode no.: Season 3 Episode 23
- Directed by: James Whitmore, Jr.
- Story by: Greg Berlanti; Jeffrey Stepakoff
- Teleplay by: Tom Kapinos; Gina Fattore
- Original air date: May 24, 2000

Guest appearances
- Dylan Neal as Doug Witter; Michael Pitt as Henry Parker; Adam Kaufman as Ethan Brody; Obi Ndefo as Bodie Wells; David Dukes as Joseph McPhee

Episode chronology
← Previous "The Anti-Prom"	Next → "Coming Home"

"True Love" is an episode of the American television series Dawson's Creek, which originally aired on The WB on May 24, 2000. The episode was directed by James Whitmore Jr. and written by Tom Kapinos and Gina Fattore (teleplay), and Greg Berlanti and Jeffrey Stepakoff (story). Fattore later stated that the episode was written "together as a group ... we traded off on scenes."

The episode is notable for having featured primetime television's first passionate kiss between two men—Jack and Ethan—which has been called "a milestone in the timeline of gay representation in pop culture". It is also notable for being the source of the meme known as "Dawson Leery Crying" or "Crying Dawson", as well as serving as a dramatic conclusion to the season three romantic story arc between Joey and Pacey.

== See also ==
- Media portrayal of LGBT people
- Timeline of LGBTQ history in the United States
