= Atlas Savings and Loan Association =

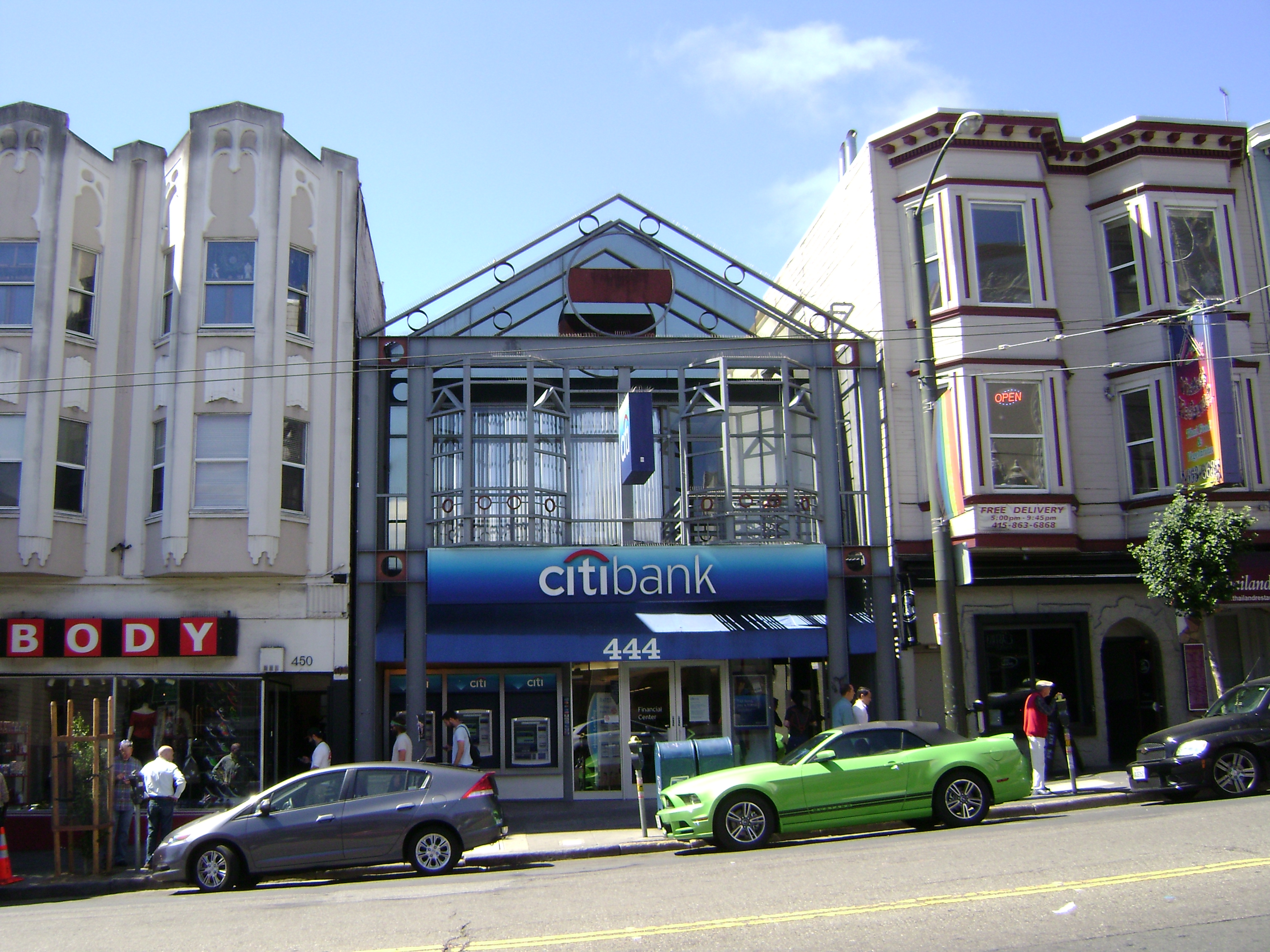
- 444 Castro Street, former headquarters of Atlas (now a Citibank branch)
- Industry: Finance
- Founded: 1 September 1980
- Defunct: 14 July 1986
- Headquarters: San Francisco, California

Atlas Savings and Loan Association was an American bank that existed between 1980 and 1986, and was the first financial institution in the world to focus primarily on gay and lesbian clients.

== History ==
It was officially launched in San Francisco, California, on 1 September 1980, stating that one of its core principles was non-discrimination against gay men and lesbians. It was the first banking institution in the United States and the world whose target audience was gay people; its board of directors was composed exclusively of gay men and lesbians, including John Schmidt (chairman of the board), W. Gerald Flanagan (president of the company), and Charlotte Coleman.

The bank opened its doors on 16 November 1981, at the corner of Market Street and Duboce Street. On 30 August 1982, Atlas Bank opened its second branch at 4126 18th Street in the Castro district, in a building that had previously housed a United Federal Savings branch. Atlas's assets grew from $21 million in 1982 to $96 million by December 1983.

On 6 January 1984, Atlas branches closed between 1:00 and 1:15 p.m., and employees wore black armbands in protest of the release of Dan White, the assassin of San Francisco Mayor George Moscone and Harvey Milk in 1978. In November 1984, James Bowersox was appointed as the bank's new president.

By 1985, Atlas had three branches in the city, and in November 1984 it opened a branch in San Francisco's financial district. In 1983, Atlas began construction of a new headquarters at 444 Castro Street (replacing the former Eureka Super Market), at the same time as it closed its 18th Street office.

By June 1985, Atlas began experiencing liquidity problems, mainly due to loans made to failing real estate projects, and in August, it was declared insolvent. On 14 July 1986, the Federal Home Loan Bank Board approved the acquisition of Atlas by Empire of America; at that time, the bank had assets of $76 million.

== See also ==
- Pink capitalism
- Pink money
