= GLBT History Museum of Central Florida =

- Established: 2005
- Location: online and mobile displays
- Website: floridalgbtqmuseum.org

The GLBT History Museum of Central Florida is an organization whose mission is to collect, preserve and exhibit the histories of the gay, lesbian, bisexual, and transgender communities of Central Florida. The GLBT History Museum serves Orange, Seminole, Osceola, Lake, Brevard, Volusia, Polk, Sumter, Marion and Flagler Counties. The Museum focuses on collecting and educating about regional history but includes items of national interest as well. It collaborates with the Regional Initiative for Collecting the History, Experiences and Stories of Central Florida (RICHES) program at the University of Central Florida.

== History ==
The GLBT History Museum of Central Florida began in 2005 as the GLBT History Project when a small group came together to plan a history exhibit in the Orange County History Center as part of the first Come Out With Pride (COWP) celebration. Dr. Ken Kazmerski, current President of the GLBT History Museum and retired UCF Professor, and several others were approached by Metropolitan Business Association of Orlando's president, Debbie Simmons, to create a one-day GLBT exhibit at the history center. Originally the project had no money and members of the project used their own memorabilia to create displays.

Although originally Debbie Simmons chaired most of the organization's meetings, by 2006 Ken Kazmerski took over full chairmanship and began a new focus on professionalization. Over the years, the project gained a broader focus and changed the name from Project to Museum, incorporating in 2011. The GLBT History Museum of Central Florida is no longer simply an annual exhibit but now assumes the functions of a regular museum.

== Mobile Displays ==
Along with their virtual museum, The GLBT History Museum of Central Florida maintains various mobile displays which have been exhibited in notable locations such as Universal Studios, Lake Eola Park, The GLBT Community Center of Central Florida, Darden Restaurants Corporate Headquarters, Orlando International Airport, UCF History Department, Wells Fargo, Parliament House. The organization's mobile displays include:

- Central Florida Timeline
- Wall of Remembrance
- Parliament House History
- GLBT T-shirt Display
- Historical Local GLBT Publications
- Bears of Central Florida
- GLBSU of UCF - Display and DVD
- National Coming Out Day Celebrations in Central Florida - Display and DVD
- Gay Power Unleashed: GLBT Activism in the 1960s
- GLBT Heroes and Pioneers
- Miss "P"
- The Center/GLBT Community Services
- Saviz Shafaie, Local and International Activist
- Jack Nichols, Author and National and Local Activist
- Sue Hanna, Business Woman and Owner of Faces, a woman's club

== Staff ==
- President

Ken Kazmerski

- Vice-President

Dawn Rosendahl

- Secretary

Robert Kinney

- Treasurer

Russell Evans

- Director - Virtual Museum

David Bain

- Director - Mobile Museum

Cheryl Turner
