= LGBTQ culture in Philadelphia =

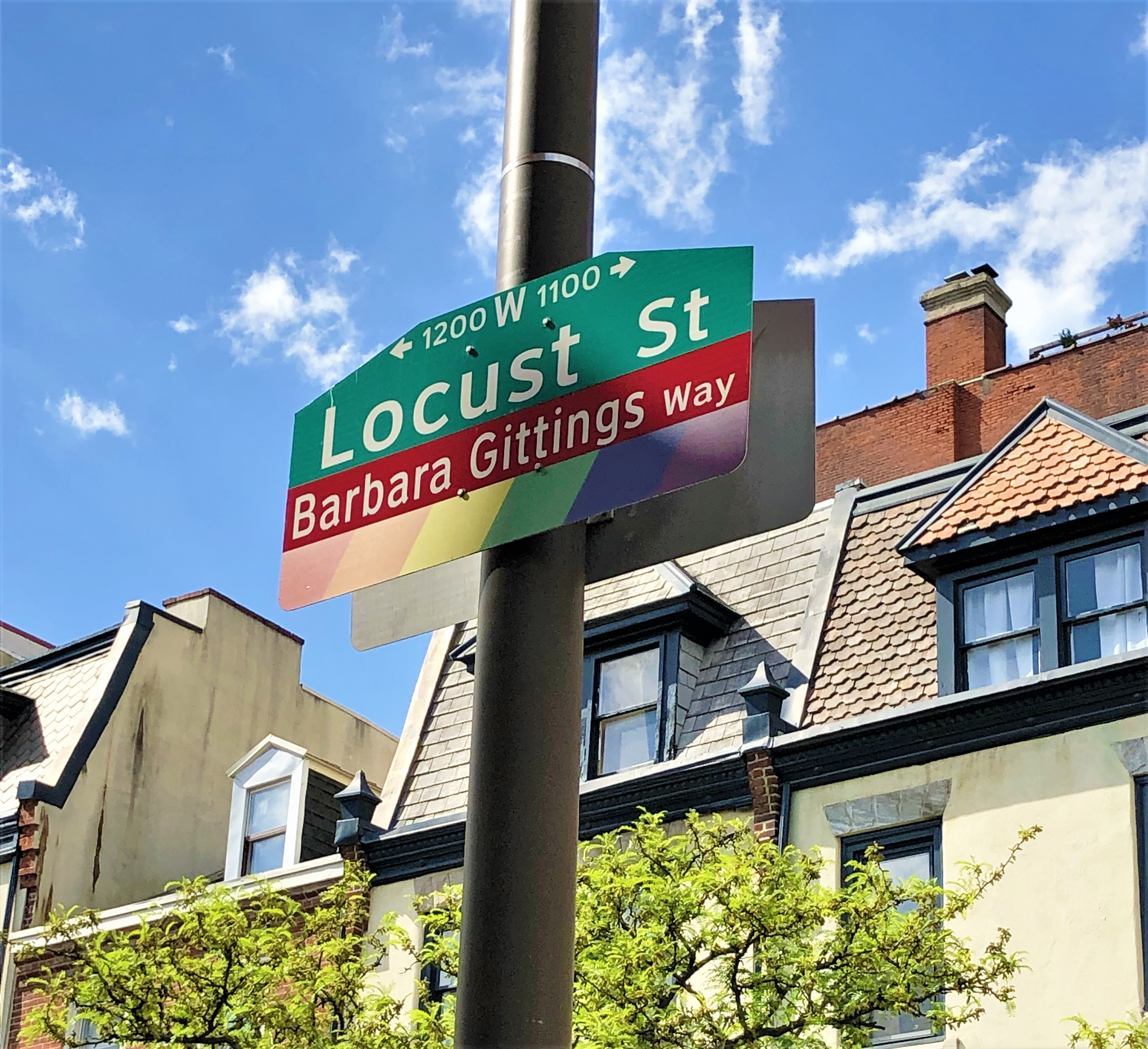
Barbara Gittings Way, Philadelphia Gayborhood street sign

The development of LGBTQ culture in Philadelphia can be traced back to the early 20th century. It exists in current times as a dynamic, diverse, and philanthropically active culture with establishments and events held to promote LGBTQ culture and rights in Philadelphia and beyond.

Philadelphia and its residents have played a significant role in LBGTQ history. The city has 12 historical markers commemorating LGBT events and people, more than any other city in the world, according to local organization Equality Forum.

== History ==
=== 20th century ===
The Philadelphia LGBT community has roots as far back as the 1930s and 1940s. Early gay networks would meet privately at underground house parties and other private venues within Center City, West Philadelphia, and Germantown. In tandem with the substantial post-WWII expansion of American suburbia, which resulted in white-collar families relocating to the suburbs in significant numbers, Center City had plentiful affordable housing and urban anonymity that allowed the LGBT culture to be hidden from public view.

By the 1950s, a jazz, espresso, and beatnik culture was developing around Rittenhouse Square and in coffee houses on Sansom Street, creating a niche for the city's gay community.

In the mid-20th century, conflicts between homosexual and heterosexual communities were common within Center City neighborhoods. Gays and lesbians were found commonly living around Rittenhouse Square and saw Rittenhouse Square Park as a safety zone for camaraderie. Gay men used the park as a place to find other men. Hippies and pre-Stonewall gays were also part of their own groups there.

In 1962, the LGBT culture developing in Philadelphia eventually inspired the first article published in America that recognized a city's gay community and political scene, which was titled "The Furtive Fraternity" and described political limitations the emerging gay community was confronting, was published in Philadelphia magazine.

Also in 1962, the Janus Society was founded in Philadelphia; it is notable as the publisher of Drum magazine, one of the earliest LGBT-interest publications in the United States and most widely circulated in the 1960s, and for its role in organizing many of the nation's earliest LGBT rights demonstrations. The Janus Society takes its name from the Roman two-faced God Janus of beginnings, endings, and doorways. The organization focused on a policy of militant respectability, a strategy demanding respect by showing the public LGBT individuals conforming to heteronormative standards of dress at protests.

Washington Square West, commercially called Midtown Village, is mainly referred to as the Gayborhood by locals. Since the 1920s, this area has been a mecca for fashion and entertainment. During the 1960s, a transition from high-end stage performances and chorus lines into cheap adult entertainment took place. Musical bars on Camac and Quince Streets hosted gay and lesbian clientele but required a fee be paid to Philadelphia mob connections for law enforcement to look the other way. The preservation of these bars around 13th and Locust Streets, through dealings with the Philadelphia mob, made gay culture appear more closely tied to illegal activity, which drew attention from the authorities.

==== Dewey's sit-ins ====
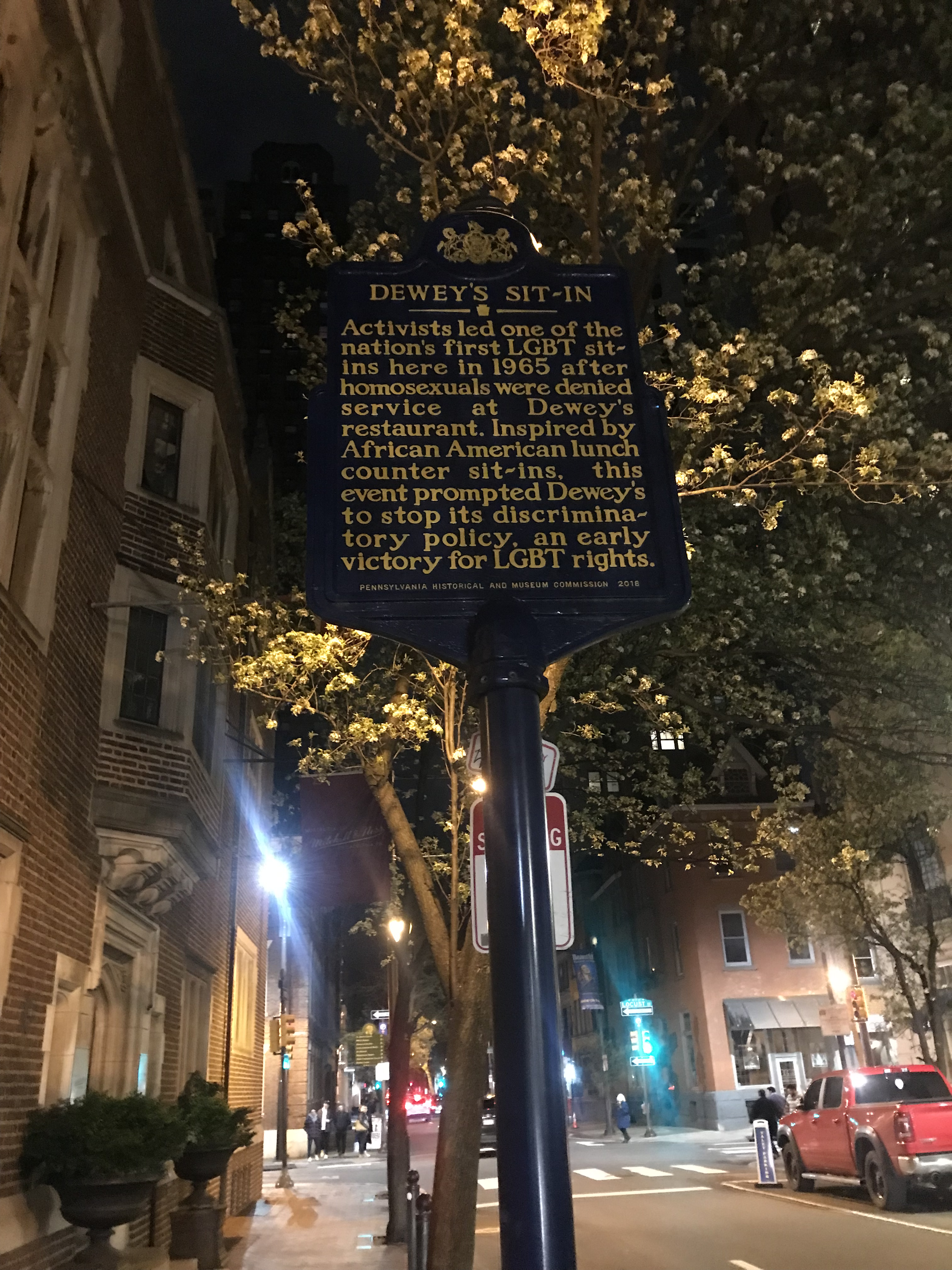
The historic marker for "Dewey's Sit-In" (dedicated on October 1, 2018) located at 17th and St. James streets in the neighborhood of Rittenhouse Square.

On April 25, 1965, over 150 people were denied service at Dewey's, a local coffee shop and diner at 219 South 17th Street in Philadelphia, near Rittenhouse Square. Those denied service were variously described at the time as "homosexuals", "masculine women", "feminine men", and "persons wearing non-conformist clothing". Three teenagers reported by Janus Society and Drum magazine to be two males and one female staged a sit-in, which became known as the first of two Dewey's sit-ins. After restaurant managers contacted police, the three were arrested. In the process of offering legal support for the teens, local activist and president of the Janus Society, Clark Polak, was also arrested. Demonstrations took place outside the establishment over the next five days with 1500 flyers being distributed by the Janus Society and its supporters. Three people staged a second sit-in on May 2, 1965. The police were again called, but refused to make arrests this time. The Janus Society said the protests were successful in preventing further arrests and the action was deemed “the first sit-in of its kind in the history of the United States” by Drum magazine.

In October 2018, the Pennsylvania Historical and Museum Commission erected a historic marker to commemorate the sit-in, which was the eighth historic marker to be dedicated towards LGBT rights in the city of Philadelphia. The marker is at 17th and St. James streets in the neighborhood of Rittenhouse Square.

==== Annual Reminder ====
The Annual Reminders were a series of early pickets organized by LGBTQ organizations, which took place annually on July 4 at Independence Hall beginning in 1965 and were among the earliest LGBT demonstrations in the United States. The events were designed to inform and remind the American people that LGBT people did not enjoy basic civil rights protections. The reminders were held each year until 1969, with the final picket taking place shortly after the June 28 Stonewall riot in New York City, which was considered the flashpoint of the modern gay liberation movement. Reminder organizers decided to discontinue the July 4 pickets. Instead, they organized the Christopher Street Liberation Day demonstration held June 28, 1970, to commemorate the anniversary of the riot. In 2005 a historical marker was placed at 6th and Chestnut Streets to commemorate the Annual Reminders.

=== Late 20th century ===
Philadelphia's first Gay Pride Parade was held in Rittenhouse Square on June 11, 1972, hosted by the Gay Activists Alliance, the Homophile Action League, Radicalesbians and groups from Penn State and Temple University. The route started down Chestnut Street and ended at Independence Park.

In 1973 three Gay Activists Alliance (GAA) members, Tom Wilson Weinberg, Dan Sherbo and Bern Boyle, opened the gay bookstore Giovanni's Room at 232 South Street. It was named after James Baldwin's gay novel Giovanni's Room. The store was closed shortly afterward due to a homophobic landlord. The store changed hands to lesbian activist Pat Hill in 1974 and then to Ed Hermance and Arleen Oshan in 1976. Hermance and Olshan moved the store first to 1426 Spruce Street and then to its final location on 12th and Pine in 1979. It has been called the "center of gay Philly". Philly AIDS Thrift took over the store after the owner retired in 2014 and so the store is now called Philly AIDS Thrift at Giovanni's Room, also known as PAT @ Giovanni's Room.

Philadelphia Gay News (PGN) is an LGBT newspaper in the Philadelphia area, founded in 1976 by Mark Segal. It is the oldest LGBT publication founded as a weekly publication in the United States.

The Washington Square West district was selected to undergo gentrification in the mid-1970s and up to one-fifth of the old structures were razed. Shortly after the project began, federal assistance was discontinued and the district's demolished lots sat unoccupied during a long recovery period into the 1990s. Mayor Ed Rendell promoted a new era of gentrification, which helped Washington Square West regain its footing and transform into a healthy, economically viable community by the early 2000s.

However, the lumping together of prostitutes, drug dealers, and homosexuals provoked police raids on gay bars up into the early 1980s. During this time, demonstrations at Independence Hall for gay rights sought to raise the community from an underground and lascivious group into a more unified community and political entity. This same area of the city remains an epicenter for gay culture today.

=== 21st century ===
In 2007, 36 rainbow street signs were mounted throughout intersections within 11th and Broad Streets, formally recognizing the Gayborhood as part of Philadelphia culture.

In 2014, gay transgender man Lou Cutler became the first openly transgender man to be crowned Mr. Gay Philadelphia. In 2020, Philly Leather crowned the contest's first non-binary winner, Mx. Philadelphia Leather Diamond Anthony.

Eight-color Philadelphia pride flag, adopted by Philadelphia in June 2017

In June 2017, Philadelphia adopted a revised version of the rainbow flag designed by the marketing firm Tierney that adds black and brown stripes to the top of the standard six-color flag, to draw attention to issues of people of color within the LGBTQ community.

There are additional neighborhoods in Philadelphia with sizeable and/or growing LGBT populations: East Passyunk Crossing has been dubbed by some as the "New Gayborhood," and Mount Airy has a significant number of lesbian households.

The city opened the Philly Pride Visitor Center in the Gayborhood in February 2026.

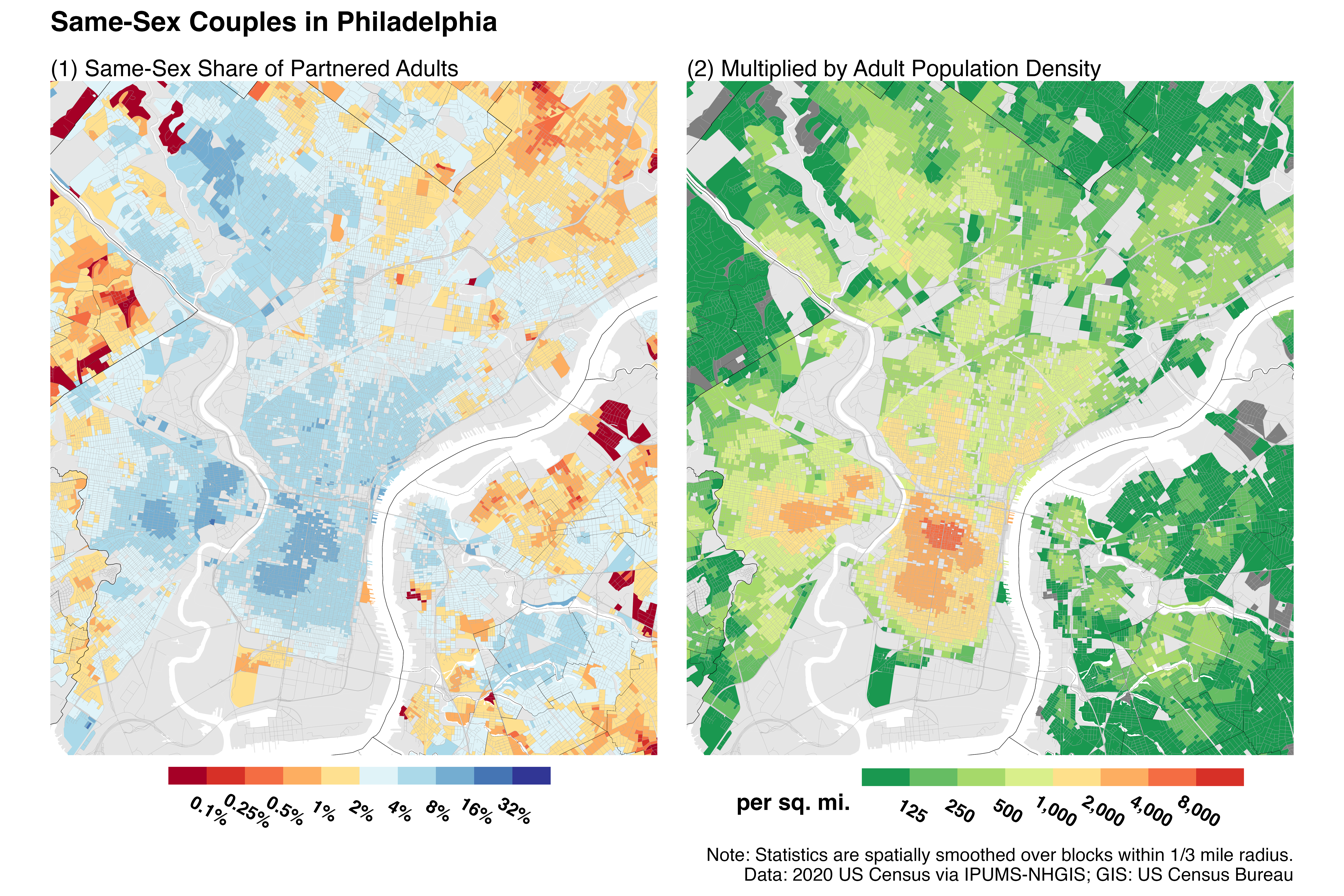
Map of same-sex couples in philadelphia

=== Racism accusations ===
The Gayborhood had a long history of racism reaching back decades. In the 1970s, queer black men were forced to fill out an application to be considered members of one exclusive gay club. Only men judged to be "hot" were given entry, and often after a significant wait time. Some queer nonprofits in Philly, especially in the wake of the AIDS epidemic, were accused of catering mostly towards queer white men. One popular gay bar in the 1990s had racialized party nights, including an "Oriental Express" and "Congo Night", creating significant protests.

In 2017, a Philadelphia report has suggested that the Gayborhood had a long history of contemporary racism against queer people of color (QPOC), as well as discrimination against women and trans people. One video went viral showing an owner of a gay club using a racial slur. Many QPOC stated in the report that they faced discriminatory carding policies. Some establishments banned clothing and apparel predominantly worn by QPOC, such as Timberland boots, athletic gear, and hooded sweatshirts in many of the gayborhood establishments.

In 2021, after organizing PrideDay in June and OutFest in October for 32 years, Philly Pride Presents abruptly dissolved facing community accusations of mismanagement, racism, and transphobia. To fill in the role, a local group of LGBTQ+ volunteers formed a new group called PHL Pride Collective.

In 2024, Philly Dyke March returned after 5 years, but faced a schism after a group of black organizers of the separate Philly Dyke Night claimed that the original organizers remained quiet on multiple progressive issues. A separate Philly Dyke March Rebirth was held by queer and trans POC.

== Community organizations ==
=== Galaei ===
GALAEI fights for access, opportunity, sexual empowerment, and economic justice while fighting systemic oppression, structural racism, discrimination, and white supremacy.

=== Mazzoni Center ===
The Mazzoni Center, established in 1979, is the only healthcare provider in Philadelphia that operates specifically for the LGBT community. The center's array of HIV/AIDS-related and general health services benefit over 30,000 individuals annually. Community programs are open to the public that include focus groups and outreach programs. Other health care services include HIV and STD testing, food and housing options, mental and behavioral health services, and LGBT legal services. The center seeks to break down cultural insensitivity that LGBT individuals may encounter in mainstream healthcare systems by communicating through knowledgeable health care and preventative services counselors.

=== Philly AIDS Thrift ===
Philly AIDS Thrift is a charitable organization founded in 2005. Its goal is to raise money and distribute the proceeds to local organizations involved in the fight against HIV/AIDS. It took over the gay bookstore Giovanni's Room after the owner retired in 2014 and so the store is now called Philly AIDS Thrift at Giovanni's Room, also known as PAT @ Giovanni's Room.

=== PHL Pride Collective ===
PHL Pride Collective was formed by LGBTQ+ community members in 2021 following the abrupt dissolvement of Philly Pride Presents following accusations of mismanagement, racism, and transphobia.

=== William Way LGBT Community Center ===
The William Way LGBT Community Center, founded in 1975, was founded as the Gay and Lesbian Community Center of Philadelphia. It maintains an archive of local and regional LGBT information and culture, curates exhibitions, and offers community support.

== Bars and entertainment ==
A diverse range of gay-friendly businesses and organizations are located within Philadelphia, including bars, nightclubs, performance theaters, shops, health centers, restaurants, and adult theaters. Popular bars and nightclubs include Knock Restaurant and Bar, Stir Lounge, 254, Tavern on Camac, The Bike Stop, UBar, Voyeur, and Woody's.

== Politics ==
Mayor of Philadelphia John Street was elected in 1999 with the help of LGBT activists. Following his election, Street selected over twelve LGBT persons to work on his mayoral transition team.

Rue Landau was elected as the first LGBTQ member of the city council in 2023.

== Media ==
The oldest LGBT weekly newspaper is the Philadelphia Gay News, founded in 1976. Its purple vending machines are found in Center City.

== Events ==
The city hosts many LGBT-related events including Equality Forum, Blue Ball, the Philadelphia Trans Health Conference, Pride Parade, and OutFest.

== See also ==
- LGBT culture
- Homosocialization
