= Dewey's sit-ins =

1965 LGBT demonstrations in Philadelphia, Pennsylvania

On April 25, 1965, the first of two historic sit-ins occurred at the popular Dewey's Restaurant in Philadelphia, Pennsylvania. It was one of the earliest demonstrations advocating for the LGBT community in United States history. Three unidentified teenagers and approximately 150 supporters walked into the Dewey's location at 219 South 17th Street, refusing to leave in the name of civil rights. This initial sit-in was in response to Dewey's recently implemented discriminatory policy claiming it would not serve “homosexuals,” “masculine women,” “feminine men,” nor “persons wearing nonconformist clothing.” Philadelphia police arrested the three teenagers, which led to further grass-roots action. Clark Polak, president of the local Janus Society, extended support to the protesters. Members of the Janus Society and other supporters circulated approximately 1500 flyers throughout the local area over the next five days. On May 2, 1965, protesters staged a second sit-in at Dewey's, although this time there were no arrests. Soon after the second sit-in, Dewey's Restaurant reversed their policy. The Dewey's sit-ins helped continue the path towards equal rights for many LGBT people in the United States.

== Background ==
During the 1960s, the Dewey's Restaurant’s 17th Street and 13th Street locations became popular evening spots for young Philadelphians. These included many LGBT locals who frequented Rittenhouse Square and nearby neighborhoods, bars, and theatres (currently known as Philadelphia's "Gayborhood").

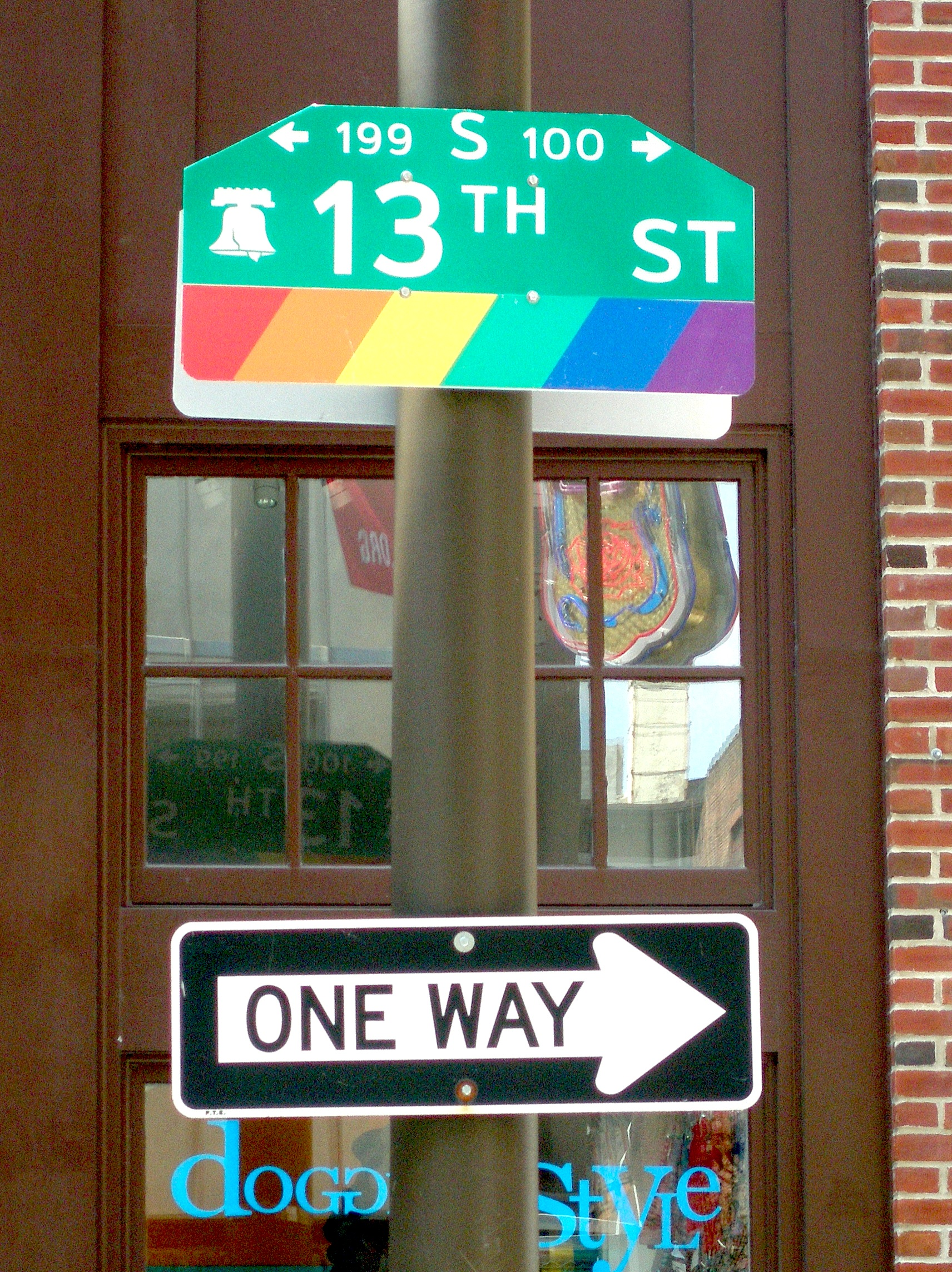
Philadelphia Gayborhood street sign on 13th Street, near Washington Square West.

Dewey's provided a place for "non-conforming" individuals who were unwelcome at other local establishments to socialize. Warnings to the LGBT community such as "FAGOT'S-STAY OUT" were displayed in nearby bars like The Beanery. Early in 1965, and allegedly in response to a "crowd of gender-variant teenagers" whom Dewey's considered unruly, management and employees of Dewey's began a new discriminatory policy denying service to LGBT individuals. When three teenagers heard of LGBT patrons being denied service, they took action. In the spirit of African American lunch counter sit-ins, which became more prevalent in the '50s and '60s, the first Dewey's sit-in was organized. Little information exists as to how the first Dewey's sit-in was organized and who specifically was involved in both sit-ins. Both the activists involved in the first sit-in and Clark Polak and the Janus Society's involvement in the organization of the second Dewey's sit-in, no doubt helped create momentum for the LGBT cause.

=== Criticism ===
Clark Polak and the Janus Society were criticized for bringing unwanted attention to the LGBT cause. Since Polak was associated with Drum Magazine, a sexually explicit, gay magazine that was controversial at the time, even some in the LGBT community felt Polak's participation cast negative light on the Dewey's sit-ins. They believed Drum provided "ammunition for enemies of the LGBT movement." Despite this, the Janus Society focused on four objectives in particular, which they believe were accomplished after the second sit-in: "(1) to bring about an immediate cessation to all indiscriminate denials of service, (2) to prevent additional arrests, (3) to assure the homosexual community that (a) we were concerned with the day-to-day problems and (b) we were prepared to intercede in helping to solve these problems, (4) to create publicity for the organization and our objectives."

=== Image ===
Alex Frye of libcom.org deemed the first Dewey's sit-in, "...a stark rejection of the prior stance of other homophile organizations, such as Mattachine, that had built up its reputation on appearing 'presentable' and 'employable'." The Dewey's protesters aligned more with their predecessors from the Cooper Do-nuts Riot, although the Dewey's sit-ins were much calmer. However, the Dewey's events contrasted to the more in-your-face July 1965 Annual Reminders, where picketing LGBT individuals were forced to wear jackets with ties if they were male, and dresses if they were female. Historian Marc Stein discusses how the subsequent Annual Reminders were very different in that protesters "Distanc[ed] themselves from Janus's Dewey's sit-in...conforming to conventional sex-gender norms." The earlier Dewey's sit-ins insisted on no such accommodations for the community to be part of their cause. Instead they embraced the diverse lifestyles and appearances of their supporters.

== Legacy ==
Although lesser known than the later, large-scale riots at the Stonewall Inn in New York City of 1969 and Compton's Cafeteria in San Francisco of 1966, and the preceding undocumented riot at Cooper Do-nuts in Los Angeles of 1959, the Dewey's sit-ins became iconic stepping stones in the fight for LGBT rights. Drum Magazine (of which Clark Polak was the editor) deemed it “the first sit-in of its kind in the history of the United States."

On April 20, 2015, OutHistory featured a "50th Anniversary Commemoration" for the first Dewey's sit-in, complete with links to primary sources such as the Janus Society flyers and newsletter distributed in 1965, a Drum Magazine article about the sit-ins (with photos), and a letter to the editor of the magazine. The site also lists oral histories collected in the 1990s from Dewey's patrons and residents of the 1960s.

The Dewey's Restaurant on 17th & St. James Streets in Philadelphia, where the two sit-ins took place, no longer exists. Dewey's was later replaced by Little Pete's Restaurant, and in 2017, after 40 years as Little Pete's, the building was demolished to make room for a luxury hotel.

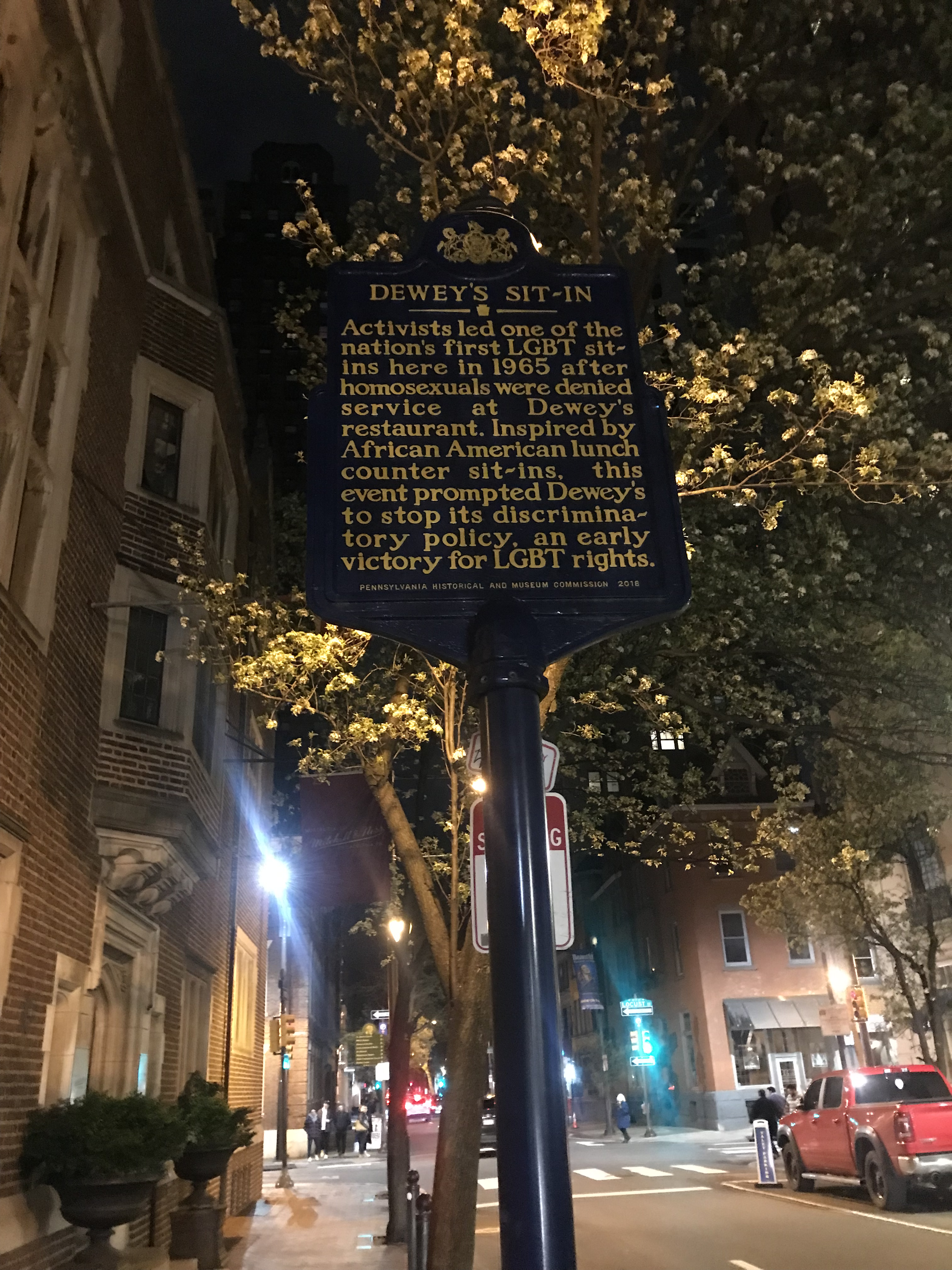
The historic marker for "Dewey's Sit-In" (dedicated on October 1, 2018) located at 17th and St. James streets in the neighborhood of Rittenhouse Square.

In October 2018, the Pennsylvania Historical and Museum Commission erected a historic marker to commemorate the sit-in, which was the eighth historic marker to be dedicated towards LGBT rights in the city of Philadelphia. The marker is at 17th and St. James streets in the neighborhood of Rittenhouse Square.

== See also ==
- 1960s in LGBT rights
- LGBT culture in Philadelphia
- List of LGBT actions in the United States prior to the Stonewall riots
