= Richard L. Schlegel =

American LGBT rights activist (1927–2006)

Richard Lamar Schlegel
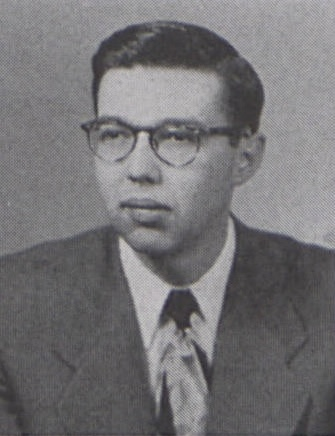
- Schlegel in 1949 college yearbook photo
- Born: February 11, 1927; Berrysburg, Pennsylvania, US
- Died: February 25, 2006 (aged 79); Harrisburg, Pennsylvania, US
- Education: Pennsylvania State University (BA), American University (MPA)
- Occupation: Civil servant
- Employer: United States federal civil service
- Known for: LGBT rights activism

Richard Lamar Schlegel (February 11, 1927 – February 25, 2006) was an American LGBT rights activist and civil servant from Pennsylvania. Fired from federal and state government jobs on account of his sexual orientation, he filed a wrongful termination suit that reached the United States Supreme Court in 1970. Schlegel v. United States is considered an early landmark case in the American gay rights movement.

== Early life and education ==
Schlegel was born in Berrysburg, Dauphin County, Pennsylvania, on February 11, 1927. He was the only child of Roy Fredrick Schlegel, a construction worker, and Margaret Annetta (Deibler) Schlegel, a schoolteacher and homemaker, both of Pennsylvania German descent.

Schlegel graduated from Milroy High School in Mifflin County, Pennsylvania, and attended Pennsylvania State University from 1943 to 1945. He dropped out after being outed by a fraternity brother and was promptly drafted into the United States Army Air Forces, where he served two years on bases in Texas and Florida, performing office duties for the Office of the Judge Advocate General. He returned to Penn State under the G.I. Bill in 1947 and graduated in February 1949 with a bachelor's degree. Later that year, Schlegel enrolled at American University in Washington, D.C., receiving a master's degree in political science and public administration. While attending graduate school, he interned at the federal Civil Aeronautics Administration and accepted a full-time civil service job at the CAA in 1952.

== Civil service career ==
After three years at the CAA, Schlegel worked for the Federal Civil Defense Administration at Battle Creek, Michigan, from 1955 to 1958. He then became a civilian employee of the Department of the Army based in Honolulu, Hawaii, where he worked in the transportation office at Fort Shafter. When he sought top-secret security clearance in 1960, military investigators uncovered three male soldiers who confessed to having sexual relations with Schlegel. He was charged with "immoral and indecent conduct" under civil service regulations and was fired on July 31, 1961.

After his dismissal, Schlegel lived in Schoolcraft, Michigan, and Washington, D.C., for two years before moving to Harrisburg, Pennsylvania, where he was finance director of the Pennsylvania Department of Highways from 1963 to 1965. He resigned involuntarily when the state police opened an investigation into his sexuality. From 1966 to mid-1967, he worked for a Philadelphia-based accounting firm named Laventhol, Krekstein, and Griffith, CPAs. He later worked at Paul Brooker Sales International from 1972 to 1979. In retirement, he became a financial investor and millionaire.

== Gay rights activism ==
Fired from his federal job in July 1961, Schlegel exhausted federal administrative appeals before filing a wrongful termination suit in 1963 in the United States Court of Federal Claims. He declared that the charge of "immoral and indecent conduct" was unconstitutionally vague and that the civil service's efficiency was not impacted by his private life. He sought reinstatement and back pay. Six years later, the seven-judge panel ruled unanimously against him, declaring that "any schoolboy knows that a homosexual act is immoral, indecent, lewd, and obscene" and that homosexual conduct undermined the efficient workings of government. On February 28, 1970, ACLU lawyers Norman Dorsen and Melvin Wulf petitioned the United States Supreme Court to hear Schleger's case, casting it as a landmark case for civil liberties. On April 20, 1970, the Supreme Court unanimously refused to hear Schlegel's case. Although Schlegel failed to regain his job, Schlegel v. United States is considered an early landmark case in the American gay rights movement.

During the 1960s, Schlegel became an active member of the Janus Society, an early homophile association based in Philadelphia, and founded a Janus Society chapter in Harrisburg. Barred from government jobs, he became active in gay magazine publishing, working as a proofreader, writer, and editor for Guild Press and Potomac News (both owned by H. Lynn Womack), Drum (edited by Clark Polak), and Trojan Book Service from 1967 to 1969. In 1970, he was editor and publisher of PACE!, a short-lived magazine published by the Philadelphia Action Committee for Equality.

== Death and legacy ==
Schlegel lived in Pennsylvania from 1970 until his death on February 25, 2006, at the age of 79. He was interred at Sweitzers Memorial Cemetery in his hometown of Berrysburg. He endowed a scholarship at Bucknell University in 1999, and his will posthumously established the Richard L. Schlegel National Legion of Honor Award for an Emerging Activist, based at American University. Schlegel's correspondence and other papers are held in the library archives of Cornell University, the ONE National Gay & Lesbian Archives at the University of Southern California, and other institutions.

In October 2021, the Pennsylvania Historical and Museum Commission installed a roadside state historical marker outside Schlegel's row house at 205 State Street in Harrisburg. The marker was one of two sponsored by the LGBT Center of Central Pennsylvania, and the first to address LGBT history in central Pennsylvania. Soon after the marker was installed, state senator John DiSanto called for the marker's removal, pointing to a 1993 oral history interview with Schlegel available on OutHistory.org, in which Schlegel recalled engaging in sexual activity as a 16-year-old with a younger boy aged 11 or 12. DiSanto accused Schlegel of grooming. The PHMC board voted unanimously to remove the marker, which was taken down on June 3, 2022.
