= Harry Chess =

- Harry Chess: That Man from A.U.N.T.I.E. character
- First appearance: November 1964 (Franky Hill: Memoirs of a Boy of Pleasure); March 1965 (That Man from A.U.N.T.I.E. series)
- Created by: Al Shapiro (as "A. Jay")

In-universe information
- Gender: Male
- Occupation: Secret agent
- Family: Mickey Muscle (adopted brother)

Harry Chess is the central character of the first gay-themed ongoing comic strip, first appearing in the mid 1960s. He was created by Al Shapiro under the pseudonym "A. Jay". He is a parody of the secret agent trope popularized in the 1960s, as exemplified by The Man from U.N.C.L.E. and the James Bond franchise. Rather than the heterosexual romantic themes common to the source material, the adventures of Harry Chess were openly homosexual, intended to appeal to gay male readers.

Harry Chess is a former trapeze artist; his name is a pun referring to his hairy chest. He has a long thin face with a prominently cleft chin. His sidekick is Mickey Muscle, his adopted brother who is an inarticulate teenage body builder. "A.U.N.T.I.E." stands for "Agents' Undercover Network to Investigate Evil", parodying the "U.N.C.L.E." of the TV series using the affectionate gay slang for an older gay man. Harry and Mickey would later become members of F.U.G.G ("Federal Undercover Gay Goodguys"). The strip also featured contemporary political satire, parodying the families of Republican figures such as Spiro Agnew, Richard Nixon, and Ronald Reagan.

The comics villains were similar to threats gay men faced at the time and the character Harry Chess asserted a humorous and positive approach to gay sex and life. The illustrations of the comic were frequently of muscular, hairy, men wearing tight and revealing clothes if wearing any clothes. For example, in one issue Harry Chess and Mickey Muscle foil a plot to mix ground glass into tanks at the “Cay-Why” factory, a reference to K-Y Jelly, a sexual lubricant. The text of the comic was filled with gay slang, homoerotic innuendo, and double entendres that were at risk of being labeled obscene by the United States Postal Service.

== History ==
Harry Chess was created by Allen J. Shapiro (1932–1987) under the pseudonym "A. Jay". The character appeared in a one-off cartoon published in Drum magazine in November 1964, a homophile publication featuring news and erotica. He then became the protagonist of Al Shapiro's Harry Chess: That Man from A.U.N.T.I.E., which began running in Drum in March 1965 and ended in 1966. These early strips, edited by Drum publisher Clark Polak, were reprinted in a collection entitled The Uncensored Adventures of Harry Chess 0068 7/8: That Man from A.U.N.T.I.E. (1966).

After Drum ceased publication, the character's strips were picked up by Queen's Quarterly. In 1977, the series began appearing in Drummer magazine, where Shapiro served as art director. His role at Drummer brought him into contact with other pioneering gay comic artists including Bill Ward. Strips were reprinted in various volumes of Leyland Publications' Meatmen series in the 1980s.

== Significance ==
Harry Chess was an important part of the gay liberation movement. Drum's publisher Clark Polak wanted "to put the ‘sex’ back into ‘homosexual'" and he used the Harry Chess comic strip to do just that.

Harry Chess “served as an emblem of political transgression as well.” The comic was known for its political barb, ridiculous puns, Jewish jokes, and bad spelling.
