= Homophile Action League =

US LGBT rights organization

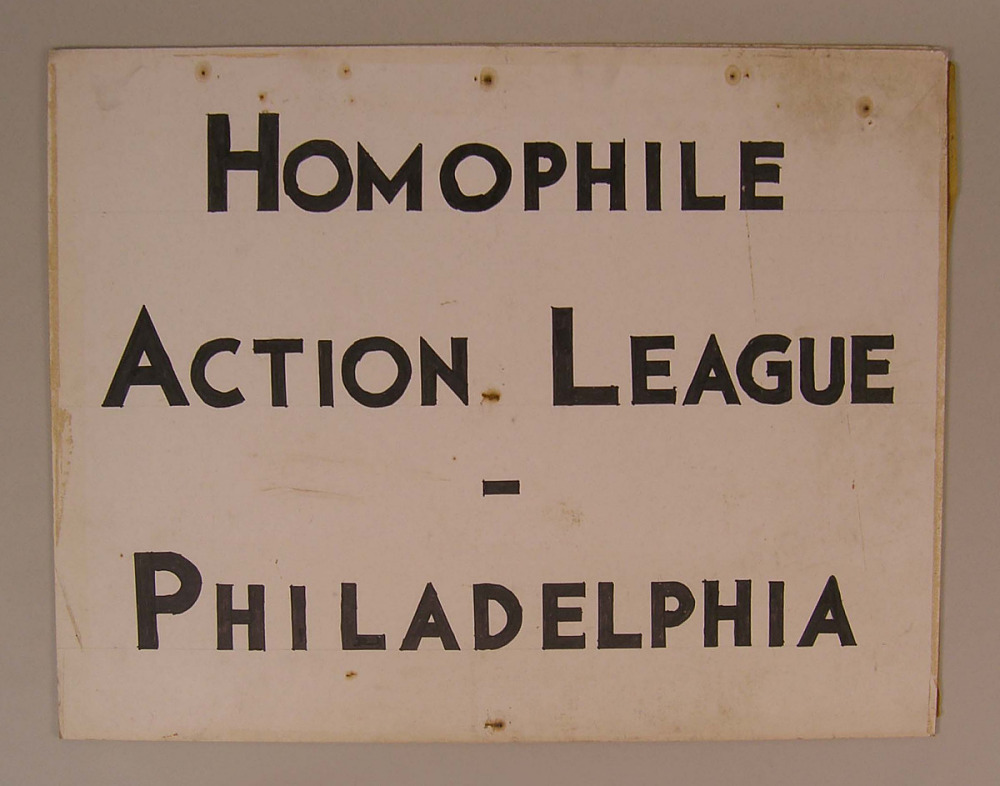
- Protest sign used by the organization in the late 1960s, now in the Smithsonian Institution
- Formation: 1968
- Dissolved: 1973
- Headquarters: 1321 Arch Street, Philadelphia, Pennsylvania, U.S.
- Co-founder: Ada Bello
- Co-founder: Carole Friedman

The Homophile Action League (HAL) was established in 1968 in Philadelphia as part of the Homophile movement in the United States. The organization advocated for the rights of the LGBT community and served as a predecessor to the Gay Liberation Front.

== Background ==
The Homophile Action League was founded in August 1968 by LGBT rights activists and lovers Ada Bello and Carole Friedman. Other early members and leaders in the organization included Byrna Aronson, George Bodamer, Rosalie Davies, Lourdes Alvarez, Jerry Curtis, Barbara Gittings, and her life partner, Kay Lahusen.

The organization was established after the dissolution of the local chapter of an LGBT advocacy organization called the Daughters of Bilitis, the first American lesbian civil rights group. While the group was largely run by lesbian women at its inception, its membership also included gay men.

Upon its founding, the stated mission of the organization was to "change society's legal, social, and scientific attitudes toward the homosexual in order to achieve justified recognition of the homosexual as a first-class citizen and a first-class human being."

=== Activities ===
After the Philadelphia Police Department raided Rusty's bar (a lesbian bar) and arrested 12 women in 1968, members of the league held meetings with the department to express their concerns and desire for reforms.

The Homophile Action League published the "HAL Newsletter" in the late 1960s and early 1970s which challenged discrimination and police harassment against the LGBT community. The league's newsletter was also one of the first publications to use and publish the term "Gay Pride" in 1970.

The league had an office space at 34 South 17th Street, a space that was shared with the Janus Society. The organization later had an office location at 1321 Arch Street.

The organization was a member of the Eastern Regional Conference of Homophile Organizations, a subsidiary of the North American Conference of Homophile Organizations. Representatives from the organization also took part in the final Annual Reminder protest at Independence Hall in July 1969 (among the earliest LGBT demonstrations in the United States) and subsequent Christopher Street Liberation Day demonstrations. In June 1972, the Homophile Action League served as one of the host organizations of the first official Gay Pride Parade in Philadelphia.

The organization held regular meetings at the St. Mary's Episcopal Church in Philadelphia's Hamilton Village. The organization hosted social events (including some of the first public gay dances in Philadelphia) as well as forums and training on topics including LGBT rights, political advocacy, and an educational series titled "Homosexuality and Religion." Guest speakers to the organization included Joe Acanfora in November 1972.

In 1970, member Jerry Curtis registered as the league's lobbyist with the Pennsylvania General Assembly, becoming one of the first LGBT organization lobbyists in the history of the state. During the early 1970s, members of the league actively lobbied members of the Philadelphia City Council to enact gay rights legislation that would add housing and employment non-discrimination protections on the basis of sexual orientation. The efforts were unsuccessful at the time, with legislation being stalled in committee for several years and failing to pass in 1974 (similarly worded legislation was later enacted in 1982).

With the rise of more radical gay liberation politics following the riots, homophile organizations such as the Homophile Action League were largely inactive by the mid-1970s. The gay liberation movement replaced the term "homophile" with a new set of terminology such as gay, lesbian, bisexual, and transgender.

=== HAL Collective ===
For a brief period during the early 1970s, the organization ran the "HAL Collective," a house that offered cooperative housing to gays and lesbians in Philadelphia.

== Legacy ==
One of the members of the league, Kiyoshi Kuromiya, co-founded the Gay Liberation Front in 1969 following the Stonewall riots.

A picket sign used by the Homophile Action League (donated by Frank Kameny in 2006) is in the permanent collection of the Smithsonian Institution National Museum of American History.

== See also ==
- Homophile movement
