= Gean (name) =

Origin
- Meaning: Fettered
- Region of origin: German or Irish

Other names
- Related names: Gien, Ó Géibhinn

Gean is a given name and surname of either German or Irish origin.

== Name ==
Hanks (2003) puts forth two hypotheses regarding the origin of Gean as a surname. It likely comes from the Irish surname Ó Géibhinn, a derivative of Ó Géibheannaigh, roughly translating to 'fettered'; another possibility is that it stems from the Americanization of the German name Gien, a derivative of Heinrich.

== Given name ==
- Gean O'Neil (1951-2018), British international bowler
- Gean Harwood (1909–2006), American author and musician
- Gean de Jesus Soares (born 2007), Brazilian footballer

== Surname ==
- Ralph Gean (born 1942), American singer-songwriter

== See also ==
- Gene, a similar name
- Jean, a similar name
