= Al Shapiro =

American cartoonist (1932–1987)

- Born: Allen J. Shapiro; February 7, 1932; New York, U.S.
- Died: May 30, 1987 (aged 55); San Francisco, California, U.S.
- Known for: Gay erotic art
- Partner: Dick Kriegmont

Allen J. Shapiro (February 7, 1932—May 30, 1987), better known as Al Shapiro and by his pen name A. Jay, was a gay Jewish American artist active from the 1960s through 1980s. He is credited with the creation of the first-ever gay comic strip, The Adventures of Harry Chess: The Man from A.U.N.T.I.E.

Shapiro is well-known for his erotic art, not only in Harry Chess, but also for Drummer magazine, the Caldron (a sex club in San Francisco), the Leatherneck (gay bar), and numerous gay bathhouses (some of which he often visited).

Shapiro was Drummer's founding art editor. Jack Fritscher, Drummer's former editor-in-chief, described Shapiro as "the best of my pals and friends" and "one of the Original Drummer Daddies."

Shapiro died from AIDS-related complications in 1987.

== Biography ==
Shapiro was born and raised in upstate New York. He competed as a wrestler in high school, during which time he described becoming "totally fixated on men with big pecs and fine nipples," which became lasting inspirations for his art. After graduating, he served in the U.S. Army, stationed in South Korea following the end of the Korean war.

Shapiro moved to Manhattan in the 1960s, where he attended the Pratt Institute in hopes of becoming a theatrical set designer for Broadway theatre. He later pivoted to illustrating children's books.

Shapiro created Harry Chess in response to a 1964 ad in the New York Times by Clark Polak seeking "a cartoonist for a new gay and sophisticated magazine" called Drum. After Drum was discontinued, Shapiro continued producing Harry Chess comics for Queen's Quarterly (QQ), another gay magazine. Shapiro designed the character Harry Chess as his alter ego (he once said "I am Harry and Harry is me and we are all together"). His style was influenced by Stan Lee and James Bond.

Shapiro met his lifelong partner Dick Kriegmont through Kriegmont's personal ad in The Advocate. In 1974, Shapiro moved to San Francisco to live with Kriegmont, where they frequented Pacific Heights and the South of Market neighborhoods.

In 1977, Drummer co-founder John Embry hired Shapiro and Fritscher to be the magazine's art director and editor-in-chief and tasked them with moving the publication from Los Angeles to San Francisco. They both departed the magazine in late 1979.

Numerous gay bars and clubs featured Shapiro's artwork in promotional materials, including Caldron, The Eagle, and The Slot.

In 1978, Shapiro and Dom Orejudos produced a joint gallery show at Fey-Way Studios; they were also jointly featured at the Eons gallery in Los Angeles. Shapiro was close friends with Orejudos and Tom of Finland, and also befriended Domino.

Shapiro died at home of AIDS-related complications on May 30, 1987, with Kriegmont by his side.

Shapiro's art considerably influenced the style of other erotic artists including Bill Schmeling. In his 2006 autobiography, Fritscher wrote:

If there is a gay Mount Rushmore of four great pioneer pop artists, the faces would be Chuck Arnett, Etienne, A. Jay, and Tom of Finland.

The Leather Archives & Museum in Chicago holds some of Shapiro's art.

== See also ==
- Harry Chess
