= Tom Wilson Weinberg =

American singer-songwriter (born 1945)

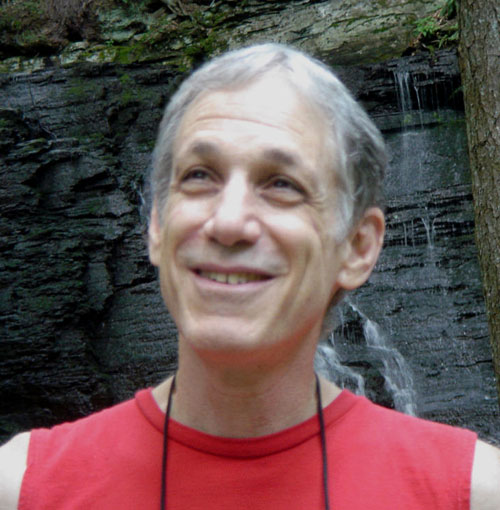
- Wilson Weinberg in 2006
- Born: Thomas Arnold Wilson; 1945 (age 80–81); Syracuse, New York, U.S.
- Occupations: Singer; songwriter; musician
- Years active: 1962–present
- Spouse: John Whyte
- Children: 2
- Musical career
- Genres: Cabaret; Show tunes; Musicals
- Instruments: Vocals; piano
- Website: tomwilsonweinberg.com

Tom Wilson Weinberg (born 1945) is an American composer, singer, songwriter, and LGBTQ rights activist. He was instrumental in founding Giovanni's Room, the first lesbian and gay bookstore in Philadelphia, along with other organizations and spaces supporting LGBTQ culture and rights in the city. He is one of the first songwriters and composers to combine gay men's and LGBTQ-themed popular music with social justice activism in the musical and cabaret genre, and has used his shows to raise funds for LGBTQ causes for over 50 years.

== Early life and education ==
Tom Wilson Weinberg was born Thomas Arnold Wilson to parents Jerome and Dorothy Wilson, in 1945, and grew up in Syracuse. In 1982, he adopted the former family surname of Weinberg.

In 1966, Wilson Weinberg received a bachelor's degree in English from the University of Pennsylvania. He went on to earn a master's degree in education from the university in 1967. While studying at Penn, he belonged to the Mask and Wig Club, for which he wrote and performed lyrics and music for the club's annual productions.

== Career ==
After graduating from the University of Pennsylvania, Wilson Weinberg worked in various occupations: camp counselor, public school teacher, guidance counselor and real estate salesman.

=== Activism ===
In the early 1970s, Wilson Weinberg joined the Gay Liberation Movement and was a member of the Gay Activists Alliance. In 1973–1974, he was involved in founding several Philadelphia-based organizations that have had lasting impact on LGBTQ culture in Philadelphia. Inspired by Craig Rodwell and the Oscar Wilde Bookshop in New York City, in 1973 he co-founded Giovanni's Room, the first LGBTQ bookstore in Philadelphia, together with Dan Sherbo and Bern Boyle. When the store opened, Wilson Weinberg commented that no one knew how the general public would react to the store's lesbian and gay content: "Rocks? fire? mayhem?" The initial launch was peaceful and in 1974, the bookstore was sold to a new owner, Pat Hill, and was later owned by Ed Hermance and Arleen Olshan. Due to the problems the trio encountered in finding a landlord that would rent to them in order to open a gay and lesbian bookstore, in 1974 Wilson Weinberg testified in front of Philadelphia City Council in support of a sexual orientation nondiscrimination ordinance. The final ordinance, Bill 1358, eventually passed 8 years later.

While in Philadelphia, Wilson Weinberg was one of the founders of the Gay Coffeehouse, a space for gay-themed cabarets, poetry nights, health advocacy and political activism. The Gay Coffeehouse was a predecessor of the Gay and Lesbian Community Center in Philadelphia and current William Way LGBT Community Center. In speaking about the significance of the Coffeehouse for the gay community, the songwriter explained:

The coffeehouse scene was a safe space for gay Philadelphians — but, just as importantly, it was a "low-key space" – a place to hang out that wasn't a bar, where you didn't need to spend more than 25 cents for a cup of coffee.

Wilson Weinberg founded the Philadelphia Weekly Gayzette, a weekly newspaper written by and for the lesbian and gay activist community, in 1973. In 1974, he became a board member of the Eromin Center, an organization that provided mental health services to sexual minorities in the form of the Gay Switchboard hotline, psychological counseling and community education. He served as treasurer for the Eromin Center in 1975. Also in 1975, Pennsylvania Governor Milton Schapp appointed Wilson Weinberg to the Pennsylvania Council for Sexual Minorities, which at the time was the first state organization designated to address discrimination against gays and lesbians.

While living in Minneapolis in the early 1980s, Wilson Weinberg and his partner John Whyte were part of a group that founded the Minnesota AIDS Project. The volunteer-run group focused on a two-pronged approach: palliative care for people dying of HIV/AIDS and support for their caregivers, along with providing information about safer sex practices to prevent the spread of HIV/AIDS. Wilson Weinberg and Whyte moved to Boston in 1984. While living there, the songwriter was a member of the Gay and Lesbian Defense Committee. The group launched a campaign to overturn a 1985 Massachusetts policy that barred same-sex couples from becoming foster parents. Wilson Weinberg wrote letters to Governor Michael Dukakis in support of overturning the ban, which was later rescinded in 1990.

After returning to Philadelphia, Wilson Weinberg volunteered for The Attic Youth Center, a non-profit providing support services for LGBTQ youth in the city, from 1997 to 2013. He has served on its board of directors, including serving as president of the board for the 2003–2004 term.

=== Music and theatre ===
By 1977, Wilson Weinberg was composing and performing his own LGBT-themed musical pieces first at the Gay Coffeehouse, and later at LGBT conferences, pride parades, and university campus events across the country along with full shows in Philadelphia, Baltimore, New York and Washington, DC. He specializes in the Broadway style of music, as his compositions have been deeply influenced by the cabaret and revue genres. The songwriter released two albums of original LGBTQ-themed songs: Gay Name Game in 1979 and All American Boy in 1983, both distributed by his own record company, Aboveground Records, as well as by the feminist music distributors Olivia Records and Ladyslipper Records.

He produced his first musical, Ten Percent Revue, in Boston in 1985. The show features a cast of two men and two women, singing 20 musical numbers celebrating gay and lesbian life and love. It was first directed in Boston by then unknown lesbian comedian and actress Lea DeLaria. The musical, named after the ten-percent statistic of homosexuality in the general population cited in the research of Alfred Kinsey, explores such themes as lesbian and gay stereotypes, homosexual celebrities, intimacy and safer sex, AIDS, and social activism. While it was not the first musical to explore gay and lesbian sexuality, reviews affirm that Wilson Weinberg's style is a "cut above the generic revue format" with songs that are "cheerfully assertive" with humor and savvy while never becoming heavy-handed in their exposition. The show has played in many cities over the years, including an off-Broadway run, and has been released as an album recording.

Wilson Weinberg then composed and produced the musical revue Get Used to It!, consisting of 20 songs that provide vignettes into the gay male experience. Set in a gay bar in the 1990s, the musical numbers tell stories in a style reminiscent of Cole Porter and Stephen Schwartz. Some of its themes include gay men's dating, gay bashing, the AIDS crisis, and the experience of African-Americans such as Langston Hughes, Bayard Rustin, and James Baldwin. First performed in 1992, the revue was reprised various times over the years in different cities, including an off-Broadway run produced by The Glines. The show remains relevant to the concerns of the LGBTQ community to the present day.

Weinberg's 1994 compilation album Don't Mess With Mary was the official soundtrack for Stonewall25, the 25th anniversary of the Stonewall Riots in support of gay and lesbian rights.

The New York City Gay Mens Chorus commissioned the first version of his short musical Sixty Years with Bruhs and Gean, which tells the story of the relationship between Bruhs Mero and Gean Harwood which spanned six decades. The musical premiered at Carnegie Hall and Lincoln Center in 1995, and was later expanded as Bruhs and Gean. In 1996 it was reprised by the chorus at Alice Tully Hall and the GALA Choruses Festival in Tampa, Florida. The musical was featured on the PBS television series In the Life. Wilson Weinberg performed selections from the musical at the memorial service for Bruhs Mero on October 22, 1995.

The author's song "Lesbian Seagull", originally from The Gay Name Game album, was covered by Engelbert Humperdinck and became popularized on the soundtrack for the 1996 film Beavis and Butt-head Do America. The song commemorated the ornithological research conducted by biologists Molly and George Hunt, who discovered that female seagulls on Santa Barbara Island were exhibiting lesbian behavior and raising "supernormal" clutches of up to 6 eggs, instead of the usual 1 or 2.

His musical The Teachings of Chairman Rick debuted at the 2005 Philly Fringe Festival, and features original music paired with statements from former Pennsylvania senator Rick Santorum on provocative topics such as homosexuality, abortion, gay marriage, stem cell research and termination of life support, as in the Terry Schiavo case. At the 2006 Philly Fringe Festival, Wilson Weinberg presented After Guantánamo, a drama about a repressed homosexual Cuban-American Gulf War veteran who seeks to destroy the American military base stationed at Guantánamo Bay.

His musical Eleanor and Hick, also produced under the title Sunrise at Hyde Park, follows the relationship between Eleanor Roosevelt and journalist Lorena Hickok as described by Hickok's correspondence with the first lady. From 2013 to 2014, the show ran in multiple cities, including Philadelphia, Fire Island, and Cherry Grove. Lea DeLaria collaborated with Wilson Weinberg again with a reading and demo CD of the show. In 2019, Wilson Weinberg wrote the musical Oscar Visits Walt as part of a commemoration of the 200th anniversary of Walt Whitman's birth. The fictionalized story details two visits by Oscar Wilde to Whitman's home in Camden, NJ during Wilde's yearlong lecture tour of the United States in 1882.

Since 2008, Wilson Weinberg has performed in various cabaret shows in Philadelphia, New York, Provincetown and other cities. Often partnered with collaborators such as Keith Kaczorowski and Melissa Kolczynski, these shows feature original music plus reprises from his previous musicals. Many of these performances serve as fundraisers for non-profit institutions that benefit the LGBTQ community. With regard to his Cabaret Vérité shows, the songwriter explains: “We always merge politics with –we hope – good humor and fun, and get people thinking.”

== Personal life ==
Wilson Weinberg married his longtime partner John Whyte, a physician and medical researcher, in 2013. They have two children.

== Awards and honors ==
- Bessie Smith Award, Greater Boston Lesbian Gay Political Alliance
- Golden Gull Award, Provincetown
- Los Angeles Drama-logue Award (Ten Percent Revue)
- 2006 OutMusic Heritage Award (New York)
- 2019 William Way LGBT Community Center Humanitarian of the Year Award (with John Whyte)

== Discography ==
- 1979 Gay Name Game
- 1983 All-American Boy
- 1987 Ten Percent Revue
- 1993 Get Used to It!
- 1994 Don't Mess with Mary (The Beat of Stonewall 25)
- 1997 Lesbian Seagull (from soundtrack of Beavis and Butt-head Do America)

== Musicals ==
- Ten Percent Revue (1985)
- Get Used to It! (1992)
- Sixty Years with Bruhs and Gean (1995)
- Tom Wilson Weinberg Songbook (Vol. 1 - 1999), (Vol. 2 - 2002)
- The Teachings of Chairman Rick (2005)
- After Guantánamo (2006)
- Eleanor and Hick / Sunrise in Hyde Park (2013–2014)
- Oscar Visits Walt (2019)

== Cabaret Shows ==
- The Keith and Tom Show (2008)
- Foot Locker (2008)
- The Keith, Melissa and Tom Show (2009)
- Good Songs for Tough Times (2009)
- Reading Between the Lines (2009)
- Rainbow Mountain (2010)
- Valentine Tour (2011)
- Cabaret Crime (2011–2012)
- All's Fair in Love and More (2012)
- Cabaret Vérité (2014-2019)
- Our Family Meeting (The Pope Visits Philadelphia) (2015)
- Songs at 75

== See also ==
- Giovanni's Room Bookstore – Bookstore in Philadelphia, Pennsylvania
- LGBTQ culture in Philadelphia
