= Caldron (sex club) =

Gay sex club in San Francisco, California

Coordinates: 37.7744852°N 122.4171509°W

- Interactive map of the Caldron area

General information
- Type: Sex club
- Location: 953 Natoma Street, San Francisco, California
- Opened: 1980
- Closed: 1984
- Owner: Hal Slate, Stephen Gilman

The Caldron (often misspelled Cauldron) was a sex club for gay men located at 953 Natoma Street in San Francisco's South of Market neighborhood. It opened in 1980 and closed in 1984. It was called "the epitome of the uninhibited, abandoned, 'sleazy' sex club."

== Description ==
Located in a converted warehouse, the site was unabashedly a place where men went to have sex. Patrons were required to be naked except for footwear; a clothes check was provided. Like other similar venues, it had no alcohol license; patrons brought their own alcohol, usually beer, and this was stored in a cooler and patrons given chits that they could turn in for a can of the brand of beer they had brought. It was described as "exemplary" as one of the first venues to promote safe sex as the AIDS crisis hit.

The owners were Hal Slate and Stephen Gilman. The club had two bathtubs for those who wanted to be urinated on. The lights were not dimmed. There were tables and benches for having sex on, and slings. A poster announcing its First Anniversary Orgy has been preserved. The name Caldron, according to owner Gilman, was the I Ching's commentary on itself.

Slate and Gilman were members of the San Francisco Gay Men's Chorus, which after Monday chorus rehearsals sometimes traveled to the Caldron for private parties. According to Eric Rofes, "they played opera music while the sex was going on."

Cartoonist Al Shapiro created artwork for the Caldron and was known to visit. The San Francisco Jacks, a masturbation club, also met there.
