= Philly AIDS Thrift at Giovanni's Room =

Bookstore in Philadelphia, Pennsylvania

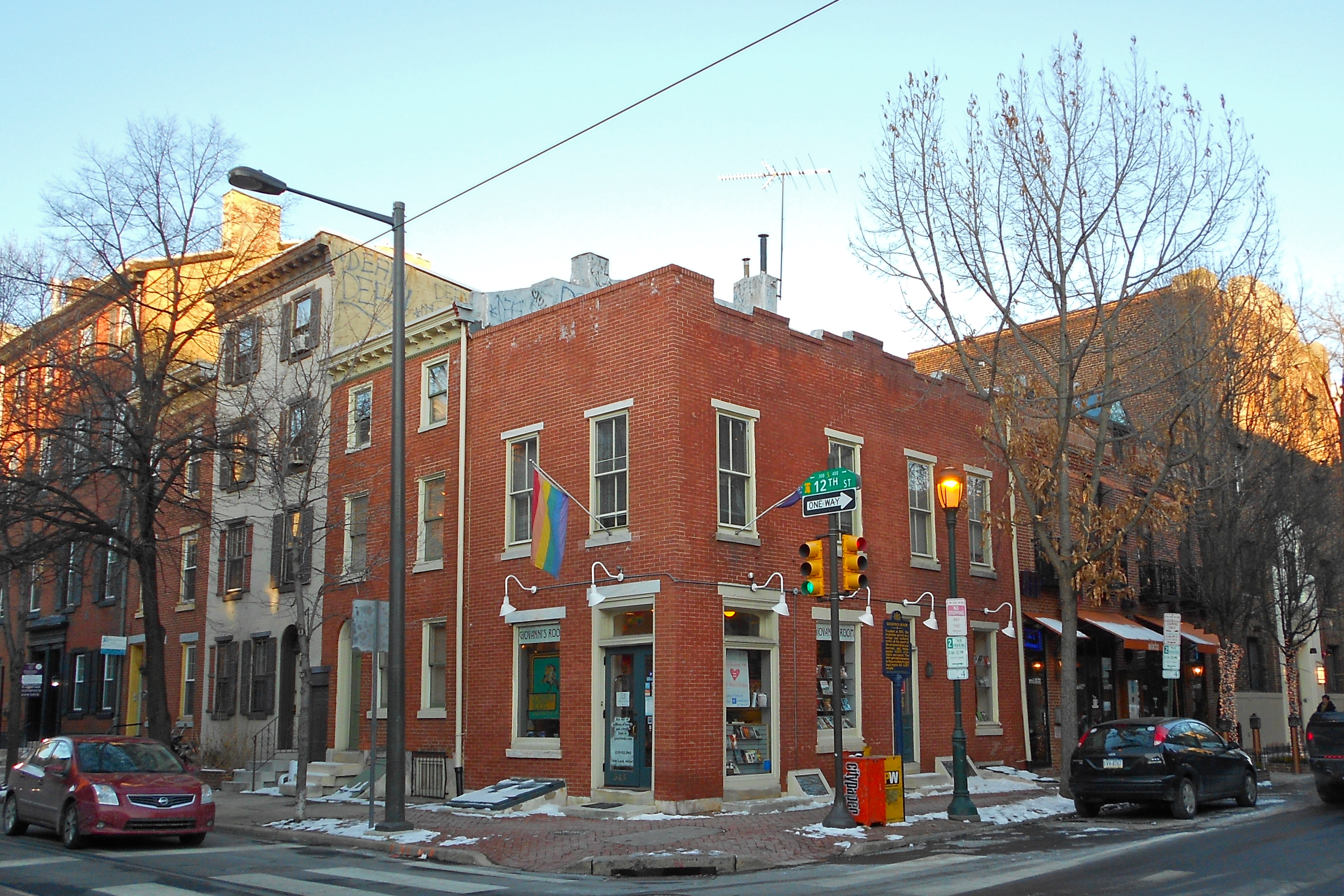
- Giovanni's Room in February 2014
- Type: Bookstore
- Founded: 1973
- Founder: Bern Boyle; Dan Sherbo; Tom Wilson Weinberg
- Headquarters: Philadelphia, Pennsylvania, United States
- Location within Philadelphia
- 39.94501°N 75.16128°W
- Location: 345 S. 12th Street; Philadelphia, Pennsylvania 19107
- Website: www.queerbooks.com

Philly AIDS Thrift at Giovanni's Room, also known as PAT @ Giovanni's Room and formerly known as Giovanni's Room Bookstore, is a gay bookstore in Philadelphia. It has been called the "center of gay Philly". Founded in 1973 in Philadelphia, Giovanni's Room Bookstore was named after James Baldwin's gay novel Giovanni's Room.

Philly AIDS Thrift, a 501c3 non-profit thrift store founded in 2005, took ownership of the store after former owner Ed Hermance retired in 2014, thus leading to the store being known now as Philly AIDS Thrift at Giovanni's Room, also known as PAT @ Giovanni's Room.

== Location ==
Giovanni's Room Bookstore is located on the corner of 12th and Pine Street in Philadelphia's Gayborhood. The main building was built in 1820, and the second building, which became part of the store in 1986, was built in the 1880s. The store was originally located on South Street and changed locations often in its first few years.

It relocated to 345 South 12th Street in 1979.

== Description ==
During its initial establishment, Giovanni's Room only had approximately 100 titles, which included works from notable queer authors such as James Baldwin, Gertrude Stein, and Willa Cather. A couple years later, the store would grow to over 15,000 titles dedicated towards not only gay men and women, but also feminist, transgender, and bisexual topics. Book categories include gay men and women biographies, nonfiction tell-alls, sex-safe books, and muscle magazines.

Since becoming Philly AIDS Thrift at Giovanni's Room, the owners would then continue the legacy of the bookstore, while also sustaining their former business. Philly AIDS Thrift expanded their collection to include music, artwork, comics, clothing and much more. For their collection of books, Philly AIDS Thrift has 7,000 titles on shelves and a database of 48,000 works that are sold internationally, which contains queer books new and used alike. Former owner Ed Hermance stated, "In one year, we sold books to 88 bookstores in 17 countries," which include countries in Europe, as well as Australia, and New Zealand.

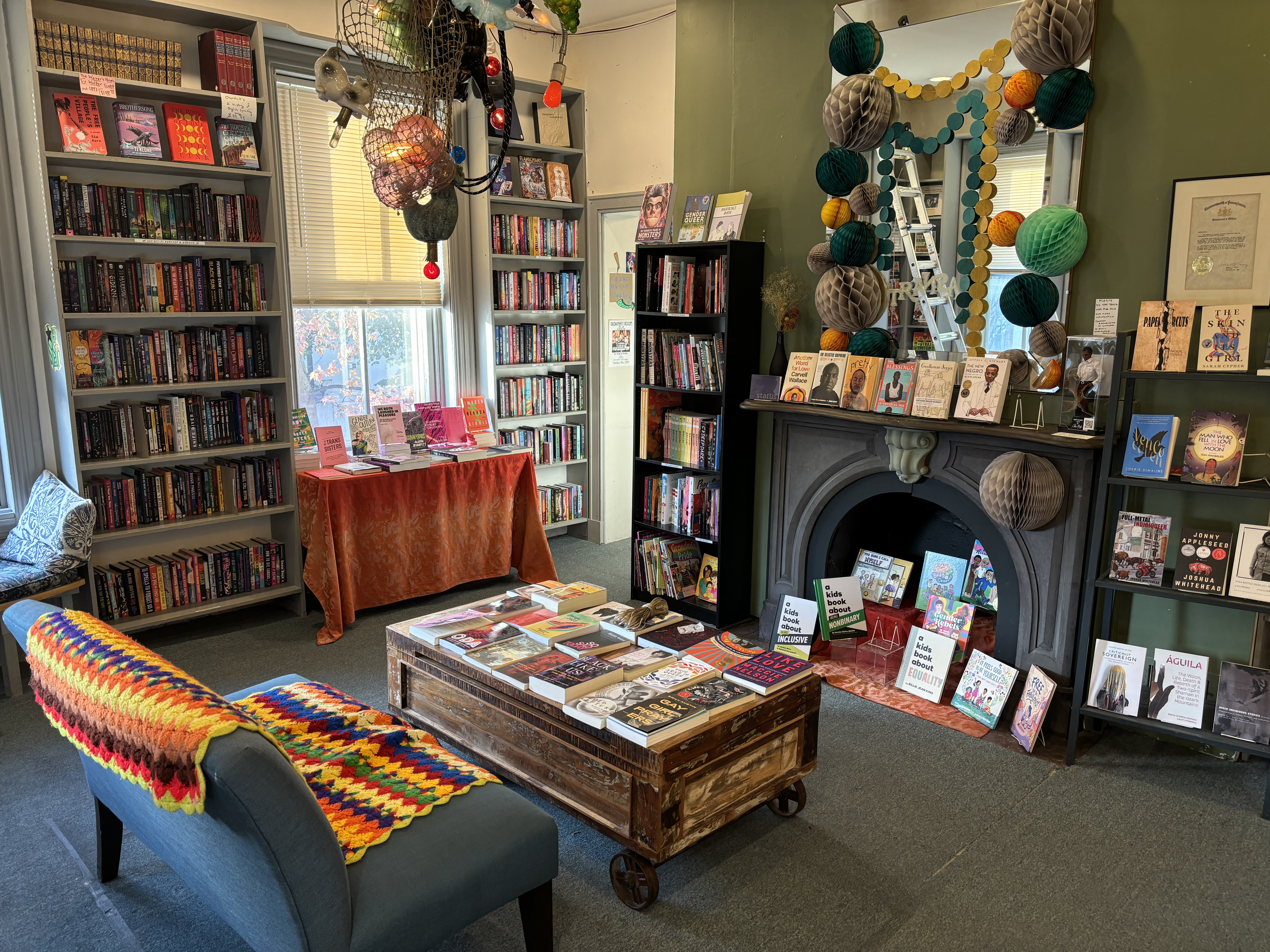
Second floor of Giovanni's Room

== History ==
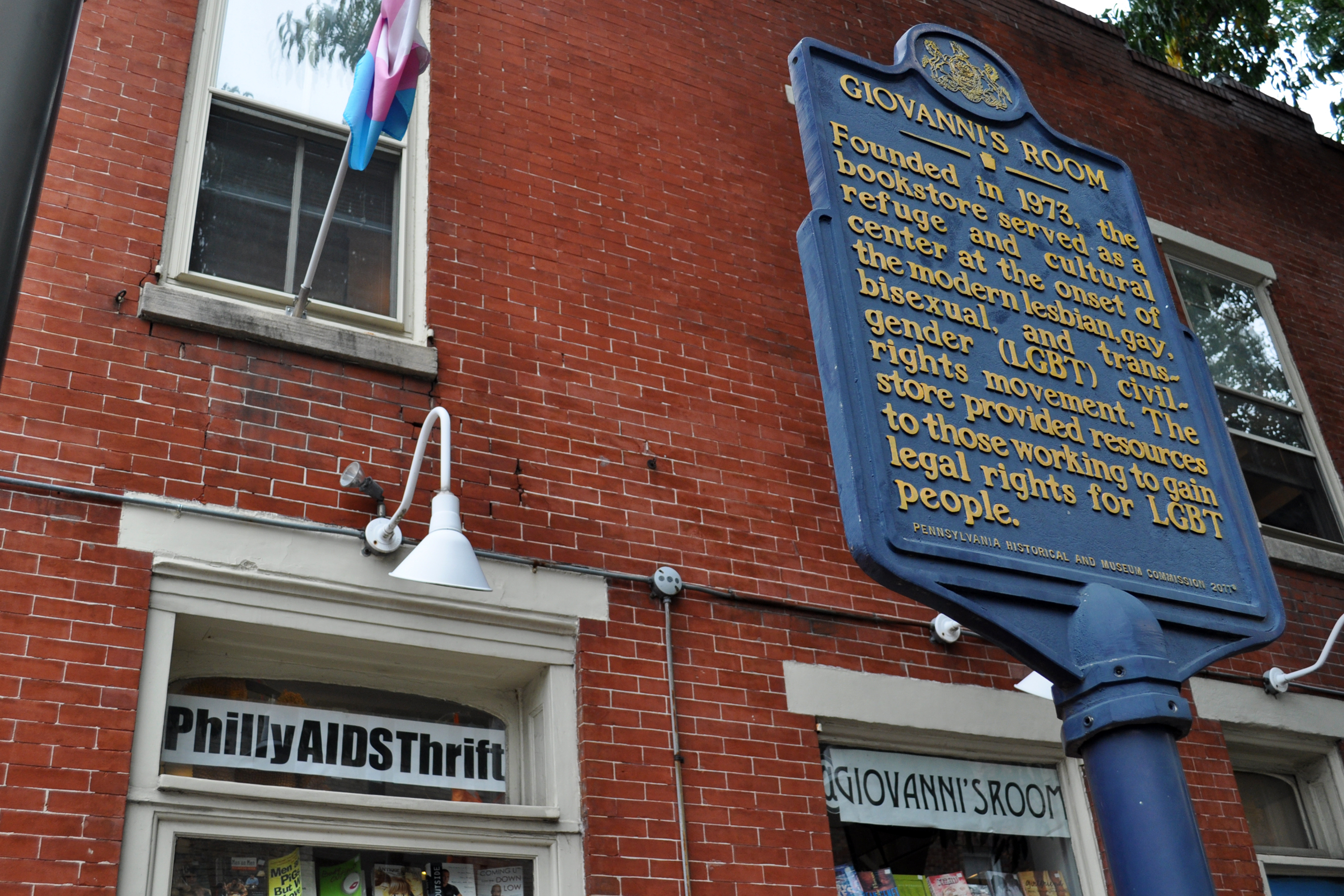
Giovanni's Room Historical Marker

In August 1973, three Gay Activist Alliance (GAA) members, Tom Wilson Weinberg, Dan Sherbo and Bern Boyle, opened Giovanni's Room at 232 South Street. At the time, Giovanni's Room was the second LGBTQ books store in the country.

The store changed hands to lesbian activist and artist Pat Hill in September 1975. During Hill's time as owner of Giovanni's Room, she expanded what the store had to offer for lesbian and feminist works recommended by the community.

Hill gave ownership to Ed Hermance and Arleen Olshan in 1976. Hermance and Olshan moved the store first to 1426 Spruce Street and then to its final location on 12th and Pine in 1979. Olshan left the partnership in 1986.

The Pennsylvania Historical and Museum Commission unveiled a marker on Sunday, October 15, 2011, to commemorate the location of Giovanni’s Room, as it is the country's first LGBT bookstore still operating.

In April 2014 the store's owner of 38 years, Ed Hermance, announced his retirement plans and closed the store on May 17, 2014. He soon after made an agreement with Philly AIDS Thrift, and they held a grand reopening of the store as its proprietor on October 10th to coincide with Philadelphia Outfest, the city's annual gay block party.

During the COVID, pandemic Giovanni's Room started focusing on e-commerce to remain open. By 2023 there was a surge in sales.
