= Ada Bello =

Cuban American researcher and LGBTQ rights activist (1933–2023)

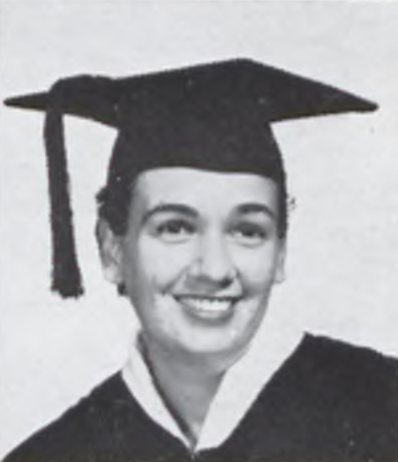
- Bello in 1961
- Born: November 6, 1933; Havana, Republic of Cuba
- Died: March 31, 2023 (aged 89); Philadelphia, Pennsylvania, U.S.
- Citizenship: Cuba; United States
- Education: University of Havana; Louisiana State University
- Occupations: LGBT rights activist; medical laboratory researcher
- Employers: University of Pennsylvania; Food and Drug Administration

Ada C. Bello (November 6, 1933 – March 31, 2023) was a Cuban-American LGBT rights activist and medical laboratory researcher of Portuguese descent. She was a founder of the Philadelphia Chapter of Daughters of Bilitis and the Homophile Action League. Bello led activism efforts for the LGBT community beginning in the late 1960s and served in advocacy roles including as a board member of the LGBT Elder Initiative.

== Early life and education ==
Bello was born on November 6, 1933, in Havana, Cuba. Her mother was a homemaker from Madeira and her father was a lawyer and judge. She lived in Matanzas before moving to Havana to study. Bello attended University of Havana from 1953 until 1956, upon Fulgencio Batista's closing of the university, and she transferred to Louisiana State University (LSU) afterwards. In 1961, she earned a bachelor's degree in chemistry from LSU. She resided in Baton Rouge, Louisiana, from 1958 to 1961, before moving to Picayune, Mississippi, for a year.

== Career ==
Bello worked for the University of Pennsylvania as a medical laboratory assistant from 1962 to 1980. She became a medical laboratory researcher at University of Pennsylvania in 1980 and later worked for the Food and Drug Administration.

=== Activism ===
External videos
- "Ada Bello: The OUTWORDS Archive Full Length Interview", April 5, 2018, The OUTWORDS Archive

Bello moved to Philadelphia in 1962 where she participated in LGBTQ social and political organizing. These nascent actions became known as the homophile movement.

In 1967, Bello became a founding member of the Philadelphia Chapter of the Daughters of Bilitis (DOB). Bello edited the DOB-Philadelphia newsletter with fellow activist Carole Friedman. They both influenced the decision to dissolve DOB and create the Homophile Action League (HAL) in 1968. Bello worked as the editor of the HAL newsletter which challenged police harassment against the LGBTQ community. She and other members of HAL began to meet with members of the Pennsylvania legislature, such as former governor Milton Schapp, to discuss equal rights and protections for LGBTQ people under Pennsylvania law.

In 1968, Bello decided to become an activist after the Philadelphia Police Department raided Rusty's Bar, a local lesbian bar, and arrested 12 women. After consulting with the American Civil Liberties Union, HAL requested to meet with the police department. Due to her immigration status, Bello did not participate directly in the meetings, but drove the car for the HAL attendees. Bello attended the final two Annual Reminder day protests in 1968 and 1969, having received U.S. citizenship in 1968.

Bello's advocacy efforts in the late 1960s and early 1970s served as a "bridge between pre- and post- stonewall political activities." She was one of the original organizers of the Philadelphia Gay Pride Parade in 1972 and 1973.

In 1980, Bello and fellow LGBTQ activists Mark Segal and John Cunningham traveled to Fort Indiantown Gap, Pennsylvania along with Spanish-speaking volunteers from the Metropolitan Community Church to assist a group of LGBTQ refugees from Cuba on the Mariel boatlift, known generally as "Marielitos", to receive asylum and temporary housing with LGBTQ-friendly hosts in the United States as part of a settlement program initiated by President Jimmy Carter.

Bello volunteered for the American Library Association's Gay Task Force under Barbara Gittings and was a supporter of the William Way LGBT Community Center where she served as co-chair. Bello served on the board of the Philadelphia Lesbian and Gay Task Force. She organized the predecessor of the AIDS Fund, From All Walks of Life.

Bello served on the panel at the LGBT Aging Summit in 2010, alongside local LGBTQ activist Heshie Zinman. After the Summit, she helped to found the LGBT Elder Initiative, for which she served as a long-term board member.

On July 4, 2015, Bello was one of the participants in the 50th Anniversary Celebration of the Reminder day protests and LGBT Civil Rights Movement, held at Independence Hall.

In a 2018 interview, Bello stated about her advocacy that: "In the future, I would like to get to a point in which your sexual orientation is irrelevant and is not taken more seriously than the color of your eyes."

== Death ==
Bello died from complications of COVID-19 and pneumonia in Philadelphia on March 31, 2023, at the age of 89.

== Awards and honors ==
Bello received the 2015 David Acosta Revolutionary Leader Award (DARLA) from the Gay and Lesbian Latino AIDS Education Initiative (GALAEI). In 2020, she received the Spirit of CARIE Award from the Center for Advocacy for the Rights of the Elderly for her work in advocating for LGBTQIA+ senior citizens in Philadelphia.
