= Bruhs Mero and Gean Harwood =

American gay couple

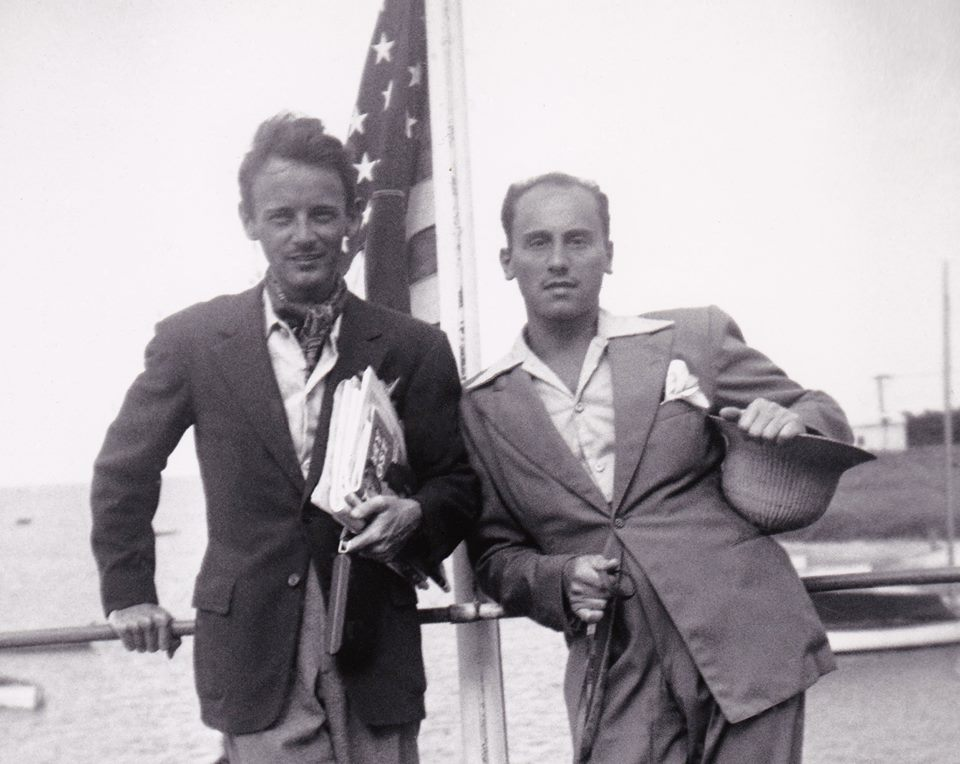
Bruhs Mero and Gean Harwood

The lives of Bruhs Mero (February 15, 1911 – August 10, 1995) and L. Eugene "Gean" Harwood (1909–2006) are recounted in the book by Harwood, The Oldest Gay Couple in America: A Seventy-Year Journey Through Same-Sex America.

== Gean Harwood ==
L. Eugene "Gean" Harwood was born in 1909 in Auburn, New York, where he first studied music. He worked for Paramount Pictures in New York City for twenty years; he made transportation arrangements for actors and executives. Harwood later became administrative assistant for the New York City's building department, retiring in 1971.

== Bruhs Mero ==
Bruhs Mero born in 1911, at first worked in advertising and later became a professional dancer, working on and off Broadway. He also taught dance and choreographed modern dance performances using the music of Harwood. In 1939 Mero and Harwood opened the Dance Gallery. In 1943 Mero had his first solo performance at Broadway with Harwood playing piano, but a heart attack interrupted his dance career. After that Mero worked as a writer for a trade publication.

== Lives and careers ==
The unwelcoming climate of Upstate New York pushed Harwood to move to New York City where he met Mero in 1929. They first kissed on New Year's Eve 1929 and remained together for 66 years, until Mero's death in 1995. They lived in a Lower East Side studio apartment.

Bruhs Mero and Gean Harwood were partners in life and music. They wrote their first composition, "Come and Take My Hand", in 1933. The text was a poem by Mero, who lived alone in Florida for a period due to the lack of jobs in New York City; loneliness pushed him to write the poem and he sent it to Harwood who put it in music. More than 50 other songs would follow.

Harwood never came out to his family, and Mero did it only in 1979. They kept their relationship private until 1985 when they came out on The Phil Donahue Show.

On June 30, 1985, during the New York Pride celebration, Gean Harwood and Bruhs Mero were named "Grand Marshals".

In 1991 Mero moved to a nursing home, but Harwood continued to visit him constantly, even if Mero, affected by Alzheimer's disease, no longer recognized him.

After Mero's death in 1995, Harwood remained active: he played the piano into his 90s and was active in the Services & Advocacy for GLBT Elders (SAGE).

Bruhs Mero died from Alzheimer's disease on August 10, 1995. Harwood died in 2006.

== Legacy ==
Bruhs Mero and Gean Harwood are profiled in Silent Pioneers, a 1984 documentary by Lucy Winter, Harvey Marks, Paula de Koenigsberg, and Patricia G. Snyder, and For Better or for Worse, the musical chronicling their love affair, was nominated for an Academy Award in 1993.

A second musical, Sixty Years with Bruhs & Gean, written by Tom Wilson Weinberg and directed by Jim Vivyan, was produced in 2008. The musical was commissioned by the New York City Gay Men's Chorus and originally performed at Carnegie Hall and Lincoln Center and featured on In The Life on PBS.

Bruhs Mero and Gean Harwood are profiled in Family: A Portrait of Gay and Lesbian America, by Nancy Andrews (1994) and in Living happily ever after: couples talk about lasting love (1996).
