= OutFest Philadelphia =

Annual LGBTQIA+ event hosted in Philadelphia's "Gayborbood"

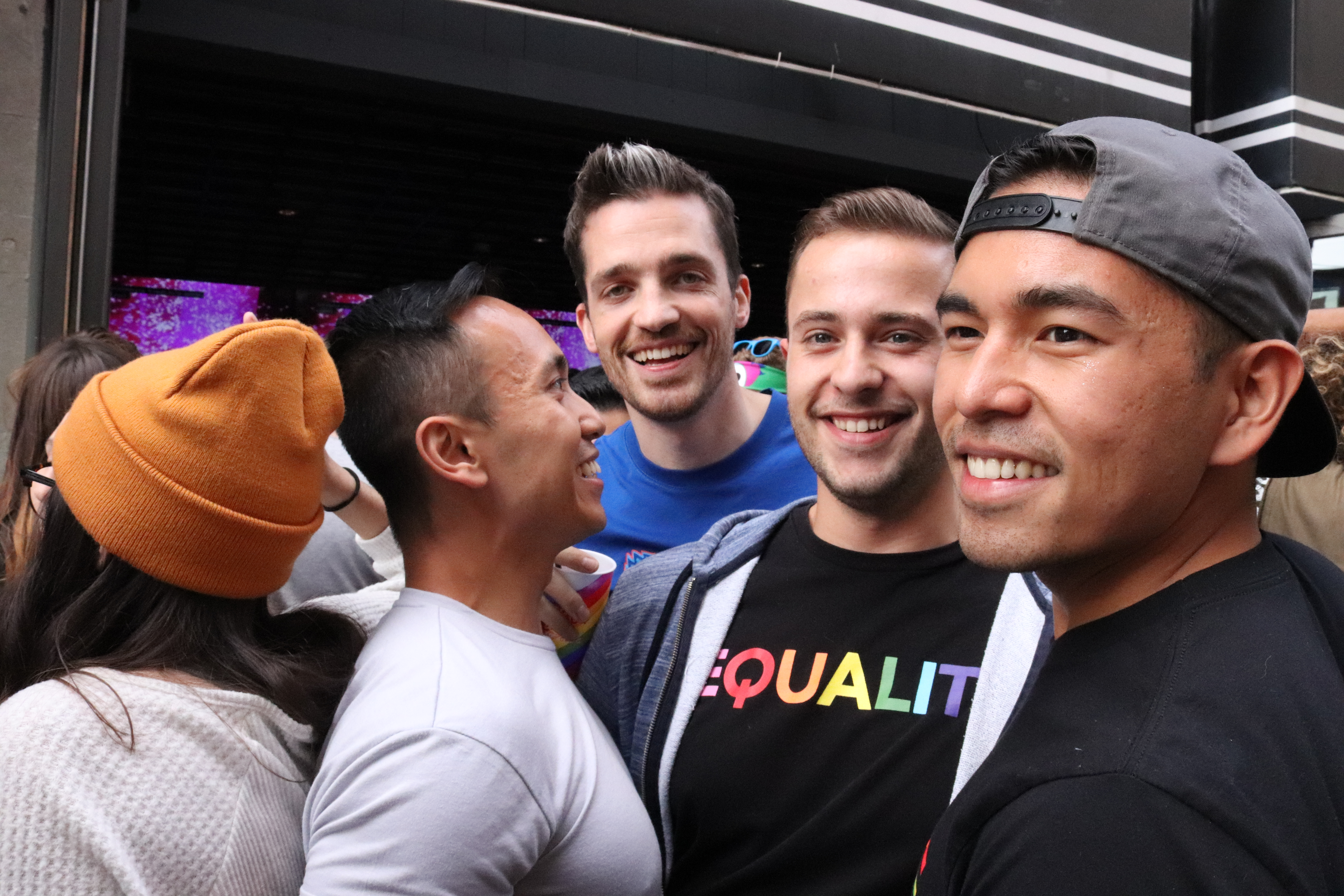
- Attendees at OUTfest Philadelphia in 2019
- Genre: LGBT, gay pride
- Dates: Early to Mid October
- Locations: Philadelphia, Pennsylvania, United States
- Founded: 1990
- Most recent: October 11 to 13, 2024
- Website: phillygaypride.org/events/outfest

OutFest, now recognized as OURfest Philadelphia is one of the LGBT Pride Events associated with National Coming Out Day. It is an annual event taking place in the heart of Philadelphia's gay village in Washington Square West (historically known as the Gayborhood in Philadelphia) and attracts over 35,000 people. It takes place every year in mid-October.

== History ==
Philadelphia became the first city to host a festival in honor of National Coming Out Day in 1990. During the event, journalist David Warner of City Paper paraphrased Mister Rogers, saying, “It’s a beautiful day in the Gayborhood.” This phrase led to the widespread adoption of the term “Gayborhood” to describe the area previously referred to as the “gay ghetto” or “gay village” home of OUTfest.

== Event Features ==
OUTfest Philadelphia features a variety of performances and activities that celebrate LGBTQ+ culture. The event includes an inaugural parade and resource fair, with over 140 vendors selling crafts, artwork, and goods. Entertainment includes live music performances, magicians, celebrity impersonators, and drag shows.

Additionally, the festival hosts annual contests, such as the high-heel race, the cutest pet competition, and a penis-shaped bagel-eating contest. OUTfest also highlights ongoing issues within the LGBTQ+ community, using its platform to raise awareness about rights, discrimination, and advocacy. A dedicated youth and family stage provides a space for younger attendees and families to engage with the event in an inclusive environment.

== Community impact ==
OURfest Philadelphia has played a key role in promoting LGBTQ+ rights and visibility, particularly for Philadelphia residents and youth. The festival provides a space for community engagement, advocacy, and celebration of LGBTQ+ identities. Economically, OURfest has significantly contributed to local businesses.

== Controversies and Challenges ==
Over the years, OURfest has faced opposition from anti-LGBTQ+ protestors, particularly from the group Represent America who frequently sets up anti-gay signs, play music promoting their religious beliefs, and shouting hate speech.

The event’s former organizers Philly Pride Presents, came under criticism for alleged ties to racism and transphobia. In 2016, activists protested against discrimination within Philadelphia’s Gayborhood, the primary location of OURfest. The backlash grew in subsequent years, and by 2021, Philly Pride Presents disbanded following increased scrutiny from the community.
