= Washington Square West, Philadelphia =

Neighborhood in Philadelphia, US

- Washington Square West Historic District
- U.S. National Register of Historic Places
- U.S. Historic district
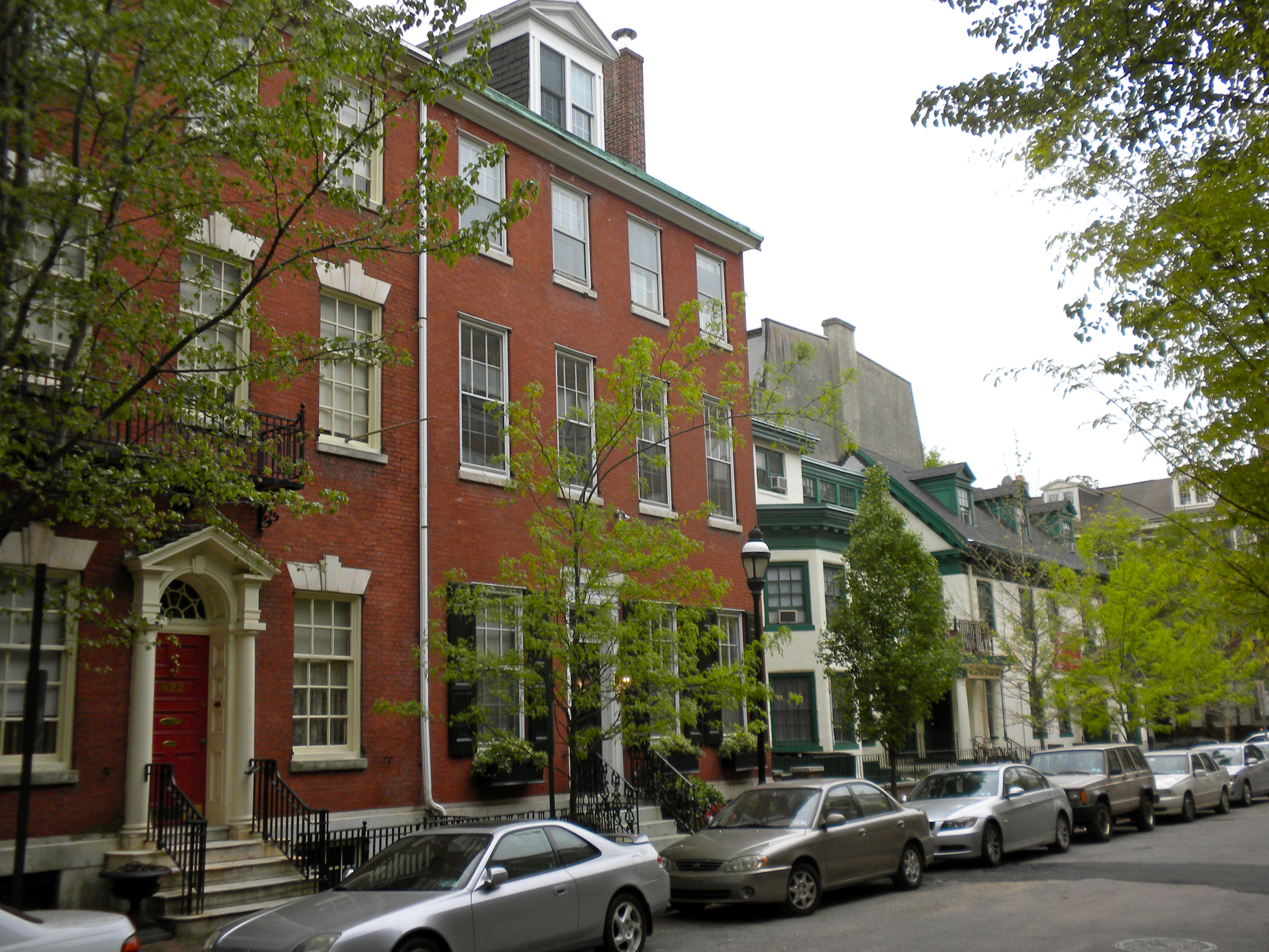
- Clinton Street in Washington Square West, Philadelphia

- Location within Philadelphia Location within Pennsylvania Location within the United States
- Location: Bounded by 7th and Broad, Chestnut and South Streets, Philadelphia, Pennsylvania
- Coordinates: 39°56′44″N 75°9′40″W
- Area: 61 acres (25 ha)
- Architect: Multiple
- Architectural style: Late Victorian, Federal, Georgian
- NRHP reference No.: 84003563
- Added to NRHP: September 20, 1984

Washington Square West is a neighborhood in Center City, Philadelphia, Pennsylvania, United States. The neighborhood roughly corresponds to the area between 7th and Broad Streets and between Chestnut and South Streets, bordering on the Independence Mall tourist area directly northeast, Market East to the north, Old City and Society Hill to the East, Bella Vista directly south, Hawthorne to the southwest, and mid-town Philadelphia and Rittenhouse Square to the west. The area takes its name from Washington Square, a historic urban park in the northeastern corner of the neighborhood. In addition to being a desirable residential community, it is considered a hip, trendy neighborhood that offers a diverse array of shops, restaurants, and coffee houses. Washington Square West contains many gay-friendly establishments, especially in the gay village area of the neighborhood commonly known as the Gayborhood, which hosts annual events celebrating LGBT culture in Philadelphia, including OutFest.

Philadelphia's Antique Row lies in the area, as does the nation's oldest hospital, Pennsylvania Hospital, and Philadelphia's oldest Jewish burial ground, Mikveh Israel Cemetery. Educational and medical facilities associated with Thomas Jefferson University, a leading regional medical university and health care center, are located within the neighborhood. The one-time headquarters of the former Curtis Publishing Company and the University of the Arts lie at the edges of the neighborhood.

Washington Square West's real estate is mixed commercial, residential and service industries, characterized by two, three, and four-story rowhouses interspersed with condominiums, mid-rise apartments, hospitals and offices with ground-floor retail. The neighborhood follows William Penn's original grid layout for the city, with many one-lane and pedestrian side streets added later as the population became denser. In addition to the block-sized Washington Square Park to the East, the neighborhood contains the smaller Kahn Park, named after the Philadelphia architect Louis Kahn who resided in the neighborhood.

== History ==
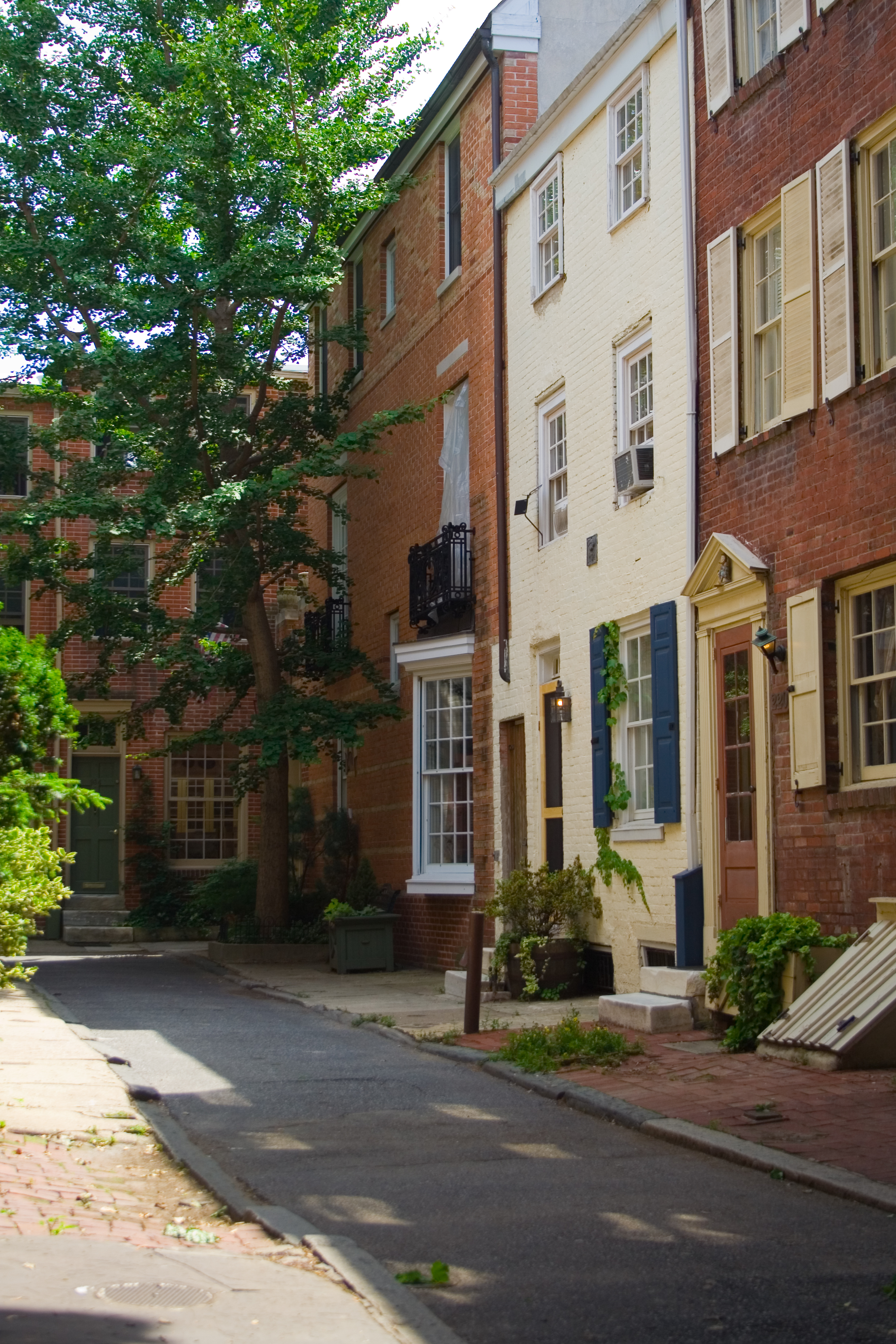
A prototypical side street in Washington Square.

The name "Washington Square West" came into official use in the late 1950s and early 1960s as part of Edmund Bacon's comprehensive plan for Center City. In this plan, the south-east quadrant of center city was split into Washington Square East (more commonly known as Society Hill) and Washington Square West. Both neighborhoods were scheduled for urban renewal by Philadelphia's City Planning Commission and Redevelopment Authority. After a period of decline in the early 20th century, city officials hoped that redevelopment would clean up the neighborhood and clear blighted areas.

After large-scale renewal of Washington Square East/Society Hill in the early 1960s, the Philadelphia Redevelopment Authority turned to Washington Square West. In the late 1960s, the Redevelopment Authority bought and demolished buildings and, by the mid-1970s, owned one-fifth of the neighborhood. By this time, however, federal money available for urban renewal had declined and the city was no longer able to fund the renewal of Washington Square West. Buildings razed by the city in the 1960s and 1970s were left as empty lots and the neighborhood was left in a state of decline.

Through the late 1970s and 1980 began a slow recovery without the aid of the large-scale redevelopment that had occurred in Society Hill. The 1990s saw a shift in the neighborhood as Mayor Ed Rendell encouraged investment in Center City and gentrification began to take hold. By the end of the 1990s and early 2000s, the neighborhood had transformed into an economically vital community. In 2003, construction began on what was to be (for a time) the city's tallest apartment building, The St. James. The structure also incorporates the 1869 Philadelphia Savings Fund Society Building and the facades of York Row, a series of antique townhomes.

The Washington Square West Historic District was added to the National Register of Historic Places in 1984. The 61-acre (250,000 m^{2}) area encompasses 450 contributing buildings. Located in the district and separately listed are the Clinton Street Historic District, Roberts-Quay House, and Portico Row.

== The Gayborhood ==
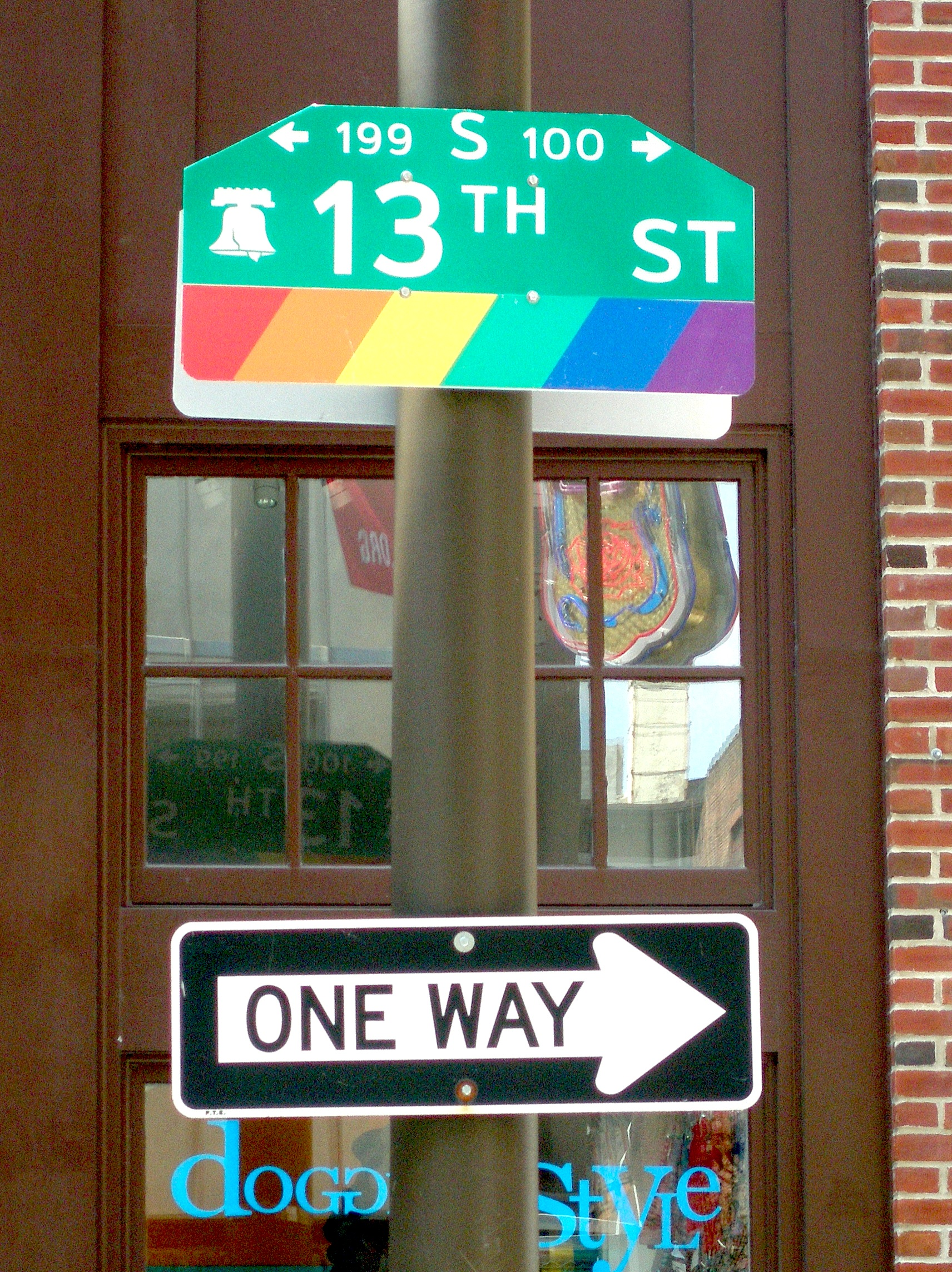
A decorated street sign on the edge of Philadelphia's Gayborhood on April 30, 2007

The area approximately bounded by Chestnut, Pine, Juniper and 11th streets within Washington Square West is known as The Gayborhood. It is so-named because of its large concentration of LGBT-friendly small businesses, services, restaurants, and gay bars. It was also a red light district and center of Philadelphia's gay bathhouse culture in the 1970s and 1980s. The area is the location for Philadelphia's annual OutFest: National Coming Out Day celebration. On 18 April 2007, the city of Philadelphia officially recognized the area by adding 36 gay pride rainbow flag symbols to street signs within the Gayborhood area. 32 additional signs were added in June 2010. On 25 June 2015, rainbows, indicating LGBT pride, were painted onto crosswalks at the intersection of 13th and Locust streets.

Its success as a city neighborhood has led to several attempts at large-scale private development in the Gayborhood in the 2000s. In 2002, developer Tony Goldman attempted to change 13th Street and its surroundings into the "Blocks Below Broad" or "B3", with the launch of several new retail establishments. The attempt failed but was repeated in 2006 by a merchants association organized by James McManaman. While the organization has attempted to re-brand the neighborhood "Midtown Village" and launched new retail establishments along 13th Street, long-time residents, professionals, and proprietors refer to the area as the Gayborhood or Center City. In 2019, the Gayborhood saw its first LGBTQ landmark with the addition to the city historic register of the Camac Baths, which was a meeting place for gay and bisexual men as early as the 1930s. The nomination provides a history of the bathhouse and its LGBTQ associations, which include Christopher Isherwood.

The city opened the Philly Pride Visitor Center in the Gayborhood in February 2026.

== See also ==
- Independence National Historical Park
- The St. James
- List of parks in Philadelphia
- LGBT culture in Philadelphia
- Dewey's sit-ins
