= Drum (American magazine) =

American gay culture magazine from the 1960s

- Drum issue number 27, October 1967
- Editor: Clark Polak
- Categories: News, Literature, Erotica
- Frequency: Monthly
- Circulation: 10,000
- Publisher: Janus Society / Drum Publishing Co.
- First issue: 1964
- Final issue: 1969
- Country: United States
- Based in: Philadelphia, Pennsylvania
- Language: English
- ISSN: 0418-0933

Drum (sometimes subtitled Drum: Sex in Perspective) was an American gay men's culture and news magazine published monthly in Philadelphia, Pennsylvania, featuring homoerotic photographs as well as news, book reviews, editorials, and fiction. It was published (usually monthly) beginning in October 1964 by the homophile activist group the Janus Society as a continuation of the group's monthly newsletter. Edited by Clark Polak, the president of the Janus Society, the magazine represented Polak's radical approach to the homophile movement by emphasizing sexual liberation when other homophile organizations were focused on assimilating with straight society.

== Title ==
The magazine's title was inspired by a quote from Walden by Henry David Thoreau that appeared in every edition: "If a man does not keep pace with his companions, perhaps it is because he hears the beat of a different drummer."

== Content ==
Drum was published most months between October 1964 and November 1966, but after issue number 21 the magazine was published sporadically for another 10 issues until January 1969. The magazine's exclusive coverage of gay men's issues was controversial within the Janus Society because the group focused on all LGB issues.

The magazine was the most popular homophile magazine in the country, with a circulation of 10,000 by 1966, far surpassing similar homophile magazines ONE and The Ladder. Drum's success came from its bold portrayal of gay sex and culture in erotica, fiction, and humor. The magazine maintained a clipping service to identify news coverage of gay issues from across the country which were often reprinted in Drum. Polak wanted to "put the 'sex' back in homosexuality", and the magazine was the first in the country to publish full frontal male nudity in 1965. However, copies of the magazine sold at newsstands never featured nudity and only subscribers received copies with a centerfold-style insert of additional pages. A Life magazine exposé titled "Homosexuality in America" in 1964 inspired a parody article in Drum, "Heterosexuality in America", written by "P. Arody" that jokingly treated heterosexuality as a deviation that exists in all walks of life across the country.

Drum began the first gay comic strip, Harry Chess: The Man from A.U.N.T.I.E, by A. Jay (Al Shapiro), which featured Harry Chess and his sidekick Mickey Muscle as top secret agents working for Agents Undercover Network to Investigate Evil, a spoof on comic strips from the time and The Man from U.N.C.L.E. The comic was discontinued in 1966 but reappeared in gay magazines Queen’s Quarterly and Drummer.

== Demise ==
In March 1967, Polak was arrested when his home was raided by the police and over 75,000 gay books, photos, and magazines were seized. Polak was indicted by a grand jury; however, a judge threw out the case because one of the warrants was filled out incorrectly. In February 1969, Polak was arrested for a second time for distributing obscene materials and operating a peep show at one of his adult bookstores. In April 1969, Polak was found guilty and sentenced to two years in prison, which was reduced to two months. Polak sent a letter to Drum’s subscribers in May explaining that the previous January issue was the magazine's last.

After two additional arrests, Polak was found guilty by two federal grand juries in 1969 and 1970. Polak moved to Los Angeles in 1970 and in 1972 pleaded no contest to the charges of mailing obscene publications and was sentenced to five years probation contingent on giving up his pornography businesses in Philadelphia. The Janus Society succeeded Drum with another magazine, PACE!, named from the same Thoreau quote. Edited and published by Richard L. Schlegel, PACE! covered lesbian and gay issues but only ran for two issues.

== See also ==
- List of gay pornographic magazines
- List of LGBT periodicals
- Beefcake magazine
