= Janus Society =

Early homophile organization

The Janus Society was an early homophile organization founded in 1962 and based in Philadelphia. It is notable as the publisher of Drum magazine, one of the earliest gay publications in the United States and the one most widely circulated in the 1960s, and for its role in organizing many of the nation's earliest LGBT rights demonstrations. The Janus Society takes its name from the Roman two-faced god Janus of beginnings, endings, and doorways. The organization focused on a policy of militant respectability, a strategy demanding respect by showing the public gay individuals conforming to hetero-normative standards of dress at protests.

== History ==
The Janus Society grew out of lesbian and gay activists meeting regularly, beginning in 1961, in hopes of forming a Mattachine Society chapter. The group was not officially recognized as such a chapter, however, and so instead named itself the Janus Society of Delaware Valley. In 1964 they renamed themselves the Janus Society of America due to their increasing national visibility. Mae Polakoff was the group’s first president (from 1962 to 1964).

In January 1962 East Coast Homophile Organizations (ECHO) was established, with its formative membership including the Janus Society, the Mattachine Society chapters in New York and Washington D.C., and the Daughters of Bilitis chapter in New York. ECHO was meant to facilitate cooperation between homophile organizations and outside administrations.

On Friday, February 21, 1964, president of the Mattachine Society of Washington, D.C., Dr. Franklin E. Kameny, gave a free lecture on homosexual discrimination at the New Century Club, sponsored by the Janus Society. He talked about the fight against employment, educational, and housing discrimination against the gay community.

On April 25, 1965 over 150 people were denied service at Dewey's, a local coffee shop and diner in Philadelphia. Those denied service were variously described at the time as “homosexuals,” “masculine women,” “feminine men,” and “persons wearing non-conformist clothing.” Three teenagers (reported by the Janus Society and Drum to be two males and one female) staged a sit-in that day. After restaurant managers contacted police, the three were arrested. In the process of offering legal support for the teens, local activist and president of the Janus Society, Clark Polak, was also arrested. Demonstrations took place outside the establishment over the next five days with 1500 flyers being distributed by the Janus Society and its supporters. Three people staged a second sit-in on May 2, 1965. The police were again called, but refused to make arrests this time. The Janus Society said the protests were successful in preventing further arrests and the action was deemed “the first sit-in of its kind in the history of the United States” by Drum magazine.

Due to its close ties with Drum and president Clark Polak's various sex businesses, the Janus Society faced increasing scrutiny and harassment from local, state, and federal authorities, eventually ceasing operations in 1969 weeks before the Stonewall Riots after Polak was arrested on federal obscenity charges.

Records of the Janus Society are held by the ONE National Gay & Lesbian Archives, under collection number 2008-027.

== Drum ==
Drum (usually written DRUM) was an American gay men’s culture and news magazine based out of Philadelphia. Published (usually monthly) beginning in 1964 by the Janus Society as a continuation of their monthly newsletter, and edited by Clark Polak, Drum’s title was inspired from a quote by Henry David Thoreau‘s Walden that appeared in every edition: "If a man does not keep pace with his companions, perhaps it is because he hears the beat of a different drummer."
