= Clark Polak =

American journalist (1937–1980)

Clark Philip Polak
- Born: October 15, 1937; Philadelphia, Pennsylvania
- Died: 18 September 1980 (aged 42); Los Angeles, California
- Known for: Homophile activist Editor of DRUM

Clark Philip Polak (15 October 1937 – 18 September 1980) was an American businessman, publisher, journalist, and LGBT activist.

Polak was from a Jewish, middle-class family in Philadelphia. He was the youngest son of Arthur Marcus Polak and Ann Polak.

After withdrawing from Pennsylvania State University, Polak became the owner of Frankford Personnel and Northeast Advertising Service. He was an active and outspoken member of the gay community in Philadelphia, and was the second president of the Philadelphia-based homophile organization called the Janus Society. In 1964, he created and edited Drum magazine, a low-budget early gay-interest periodical.

On April 25, 1965, over 150 people were denied service at Dewey's, a local coffee shop and diner in Philadelphia. Those denied service were variously described at the time as “homosexuals,” “masculine women,” “feminine men,” and “persons wearing non-conformist clothing.” Three teenagers (reported by the Janus Society and Drum to be two males and one female) staged a sit-in that day. After restaurant managers contacted police, the three were arrested. In the process of offering legal support for the teens, Polak was also arrested. Demonstrations took place outside the establishment over the next five days with 1500 flyers being distributed by the Janus Society and its supporters. Three people staged a second sit-in on May 2, 1965. The police were again called, but refused to make arrests this time. The Janus Society said the protests were successful in preventing further arrests and the action was deemed “the first sit-in of its kind in the history of the United States” by Drum magazine.

Polak argued for the importance of gay sexual liberation, which had been avoided in the struggle for gay rights. In 1969, after he was indicted by a federal grand jury on 18 counts of publishing and distributing obscene material, Polak ceased publication of Drum and moved to Los Angeles, where he became a real estate investor and art collector. He also wrote a series of articles in the Los Angeles Free Press between January 1974 and January 1975.

Polak was posthumously inducted into the Central High School (Philadelphia) Hall of Fame in October, 2023.

In 1980, Polak committed suicide in Los Angeles.
