= Ernestine Eckstein =

American gay rights activist (1941–1992)

- Ernestine Eckstein on the cover of The Ladder in June 1966. The only comprehensive source of information on Eckstein's life and political views comes from an eight-page interview between Kay Tobin, Barbara Gittings, and Eckstein in this issue of the magazine.
- Born: Ernestine Delois Eppenger; April 23, 1941; Indiana
- Died: July 15, 1992 (aged 51); San Pablo, California
- Education: Indiana University Bloomington

Ernestine Eckstein (April 23, 1941 – July 15, 1992) was an African-American woman who helped steer the United States lesbian and gay rights movement during the 1960s. She was a leader in the New York chapter of Daughters of Bilitis (DOB). Her influence helped the DOB move away from negotiating with medical professionals and towards tactics of public demonstrations. Her understanding of, and work in, the civil rights movement lent valuable experience on public protest to the lesbian and gay movement. Eckstein worked among activists such as Phyllis Lyon and Del Martin, Barbara Gittings, Franklin Kameny, and Randy Wicker. In the 1970s she became involved in the Black feminist movement, in particular the organization Black Women Organized for Action (BWOA).

== Early life ==
Eckstein was born in Memphis, Tennessee in 1941, but grew up in Indiana. Her given name was Ernestine Delois Eppenger, and she used the pen name Ernestine Eckstein. She graduated from Indiana University in Bloomington, Indiana in 1963. Her undergraduate degree was in Magazine Journalism with a minor in Psychology and Russian. She moved to New York City soon after graduation in 1963 at the age of twenty-two. Upon moving she came into a lesbian identity and her activism as a lesbian began. Eckstein says of her sexual orientation:

"This was a kind of blank that had never been filled by anything- until after I came to New York...I didn't know the term gay! And he [a gay male friend from Indiana who was living in New York] explained it to me. Then all of a sudden things began to click...the next thing on the agenda was to find a way of being in the homosexual movement."

== Political organizing in the LGBT community ==
Eckstein in a demonstration at the White House in October 1965. Her sign reads "Denial of Equality of Opportunity is Immoral".

Eckstein at a demonstration at the White House in October 1965

Eckstein began attending meetings of the New York Mattachine Society soon after she arrived in New York City, which led her to its sister organization Daughters of Bilitis (DOB). In 1965, debates around the direction of the homophile movement were heating up. That same year Eckstein marched in Philadelphia at the first Annual Reminder Day and in front of the White House as the only person of color demonstrating. The original Mattachine Society's "old guard" leaders (versus the independent Mattachine Society of Washington who initiated the 1965 protests) wanted to continue pursuing homosexual rights via negotiations with doctors and psychologists while the younger activist wing desired to take the issue of equal civil rights for homosexuals to the people through lobbying government officials and demonstrating. Psychologists considered homosexuality to be a mental illness until 1973, when it was removed from the Diagnostic and Statistics Manual in the third edition; until that point, homosexuality was perceived as a mental illness and therefore something to "fix". This debate was equally strong within the DOB; Eckstein's appointment as DOB New York chapter Vice President indicated a strategic push by the activist wing. Marcia M. Gallo wrote, "Her [Eckstein's] plan was to reach out to women who saw the gay struggle as linked to other civil rights issues and hope that during her time as vice president of the local chapter she would help build a more social action oriented group."

During the time that Eckstein was involved in DOB, until 1968, the "old guard" was still controlling the organization. In June 1965, DOB pulled out of the East Coast Homophile Organization (ECHO) because the coalition was increasing its involvement in protests for lesbian and gay rights. Eckstein was an important lesbian representative of the activist wing. She said, "I think our movement is not ready for any forms of civil disobedience. I think this would solidify resistance to our cause. This situation will change eventually. But not now."

Eckstein believed that there should be a concentration on "the discrimination by the government in employment and military service, the laws used against homosexuals" and "the rejection by the churches". Eckstein saw the connection between Black American's struggle for equality during the Civil Rights Movement and the lesbian and gay struggle for equality and fostered the connection.

=== Correspondence with Frank Kameny ===
Frank Kameny was one of the most significant figures in the American gay rights movement, co-founding the Mattachine Society of Washington (MSW), and, inspired by Stokely Carmichael's creation of the phrase Black is beautiful, created the slogan "Gay is Good" for the gay civil rights movement.

In late 1965 and early 1966, Eckstein and Kameny corresponded by letters about Eckstein's wish to bring Kameny to speak on April 17, 1966, at DOB headquarters in New York City. Eckstein wanted Kameny's help to reinforce to DOB officers and members the need for activism and activist strategies and tactics in moving forward the lesbian and gay movement. Eckstein, writing to Kameny on February 12, 1966, said, "I want you to be free enough to say whatever you want, so to speak – about any aspect of the movement. Keep in mind my particular aim: to get these people to realize there is such a thing as the homophile movement and possibly begin to develop a fuller concept of themselves as part of it." However, in a letter dated February 17, 1966, Eckstein informed Kameny that the DOB organization had decided to disinvite Kameny to speak at DOB.

=== June 1966 interview in The Ladder ===
Much of what is known about Eckstein's beliefs and life is taken from an interview in The Ladder in June 1966. Eckstein was one of two women of color to be featured on the cover of this landmark lesbian political publication. Marcia M. Gallo wrote, "Her image on the cover, and her ideas throughout the pages of The Ladder, helped greatly to complicate notions of the kinds of women who were involved in DOB and expanded definitions of lesbian identity." Her coverage in The Ladder is the only known published piece that substantially featured Eckstein.

=== Move to California ===
After three years in New York with the DOB, Eckstein moved to Northern California to "focus on social justice issues...[she] joined Black Women Organized for Action...in the early 1970s". Much less is known about Eckstein after she left New York. Interviews with previous DOB members said, "Eckstein had gotten tired of all the political wrangling and disagreements within DOB over strategies and tactics” and wanted "more political organization." She left the movement on the East Coast for other political work advocating for women of color in California.

== Political organizing in the Black feminist community ==
Eckstein's involvement with political activism started in the civil rights movement at Indiana State as an NAACP chapter officer. Eckstein understood organizations like NAACP as "structured with the white liberals in mind" and joined more progressive organizations, such as Congress of Racial Equality (CORE), once she moved to New York.

Upon moving to California, Eckstein joined the radical, activist group Black Women Organized for Action (BWOA). BWOA was a San Francisco organization collectively co-founded in 1973 by fifteen women including Aileen Hernandez, Patsy Fulcher, and Eleanor Spikes. The organization "formed in the San Francisco Bay Area in response to the lack of representation of Black women in local women's organizing". The group emerged from Black Women Organized for Political Action (BWOPA). BWOPA, which functioned in an auxiliary fundraising role for Black men running for office, had many members who wanted to shift to a space explicitly defined by Black women's concerns. "Though members had strong roots in the Civil Rights Movement...more so than any of the other organizations, BWOA exhibits a clear link to the Women's Movement."

BWOA had a progressive model of collective responsibility and political philosophy. "The organization was structured so that leadership, work, and community involvement were shared among members willing to participate, including "a system of, three coordinators for a three-month tenure". This created an emphasis on fostering Black women as leaders while simultaneously avoiding a hierarchy among Black female activists. This was a rare structure in comparison to sister organizations.

The three-month terms were a part of the organization's larger political perspective that did not mandate that its members hold specific stances on political issues. Historian Kimberly Springer wrote, "Members were free to choose the activities in which they participated and they were not obligated to subscribe to an organizationally-dictated political perspective. ...The survival of Black communities...did not depend on one solution but on the conscious, consistent political awareness of the communities' members".

The BWOA statement of purpose reads:

BLACK We are Black and therefore imbedded in our consciousness is commitment to the struggle of Black people for identity and involvement in decisions that affect our lives and the lives of other generations of Black people who will follow.

WOMEN We are Women, and therefore aware of the sometimes blatant, waste of the talents and energies of Black women because this society has decreed a place for us.

ORGANIZED we are Organized, because we recognize that only together, only by pooling our talents and resources, can we make major change in the institutions which have limited our opportunities and stifled our growth as human beings.

ACTION We are for Action, because we believe that the time for rhetoric is past; that the skills of Black women can best be put to use in a variety of ways to change the society; that, in the political work in which we live, involvement for Black women must go beyond the traditional fundraising and into the full gamut of activities that make up the political process which affects our lives in so many ways.

Springer wrote, "The BWOA subverted discrimination within Black communities based on color, physical appearance, or class by welcoming all Black women into the organization. The organization focused on activism, rather than social constructions of beauty or social class. ...BWOA's avoidance of the label 'feminism' while practicing feminism was indicative of future developments in Black feminist organizing".

The BWOA lasted from 1973 to 1980 with a 400-person membership at its height. There was no one factor that caused the group to stop meeting, but the rise in conservatism with the election of Ronald Reagan as president in 1980 caused members to "determine that 1960s strategies would not be effective". One unusual factor in Eckstein's involvement in BWOA is that it "did not interrogate heterosexism as an oppressive force in Black women's lives".

== Political views ==
Eckstein was one of the most progressive thinkers of her time in the gay and lesbian political movement as well as in the Black feminist movement. Her understanding of the successes of the civil rights movement influenced her beliefs about political organizing. She saw demonstrations as, "one of the very first steps towards changing society". In 1966, three years before the Stonewall Rebellion in 1969 that sparked annual Gay Pride marches beginning in 1970, while many white gay and lesbian activists were still struggling with direct action as a feasible tactic, Eckstein said, "Picketing I regard as almost a conservative act now. The homosexual has to call attention to the fact that he's been unjustly acted upon. This is what the Negro did."

At a time when much of the activism regarding lesbian and gay rights was done for, by, and about white people, Eckstein was leading an active, majority white, DOB chapter and advocating for coalition-based politics. She understood that her views were coming from what might be described as a more inclusive analysis than many White gay or lesbian activists who often only did work around gay or lesbian issues. She said, "I think if we meet on the common ground of our unjust position in society, then we can go from there. This is a new frame of reference, a new way of thinking almost, for some."

Eckstein's beliefs toward political coalition work and organizing differed than that of many other separatist leaning gay and lesbian people in the 1960s. Eckstein said:

- "I think Negroes need white people, and I think homosexuals need heterosexuals. If you foster cooperation right from the start, then everyone is involved and it's not a movement over there."
- "I would like to see in the homophile movement more people who can think. And I don't believe we ought to look at their titles or at their sexual orientation. Movements should be intended, I feel, to erase labels, whether 'black' or 'white' or 'homosexual' or 'heterosexual.'"
- "I'd like to find a way of getting all classes of homosexuals involved together in the movement."

== Later life ==
Little has been published about Eckstein's life after she became part of BWOA. She died in 1992 in San Pablo, California.

== Other ==
Season 4 episode 9 of the podcast Making Gay History is about Eckstein.
