= Gay Nurses Alliance =

Professional organization for the rights of gay and lesbian nurses and their patients

- Abbreviation: GNA
- Formation: 1973; 53 years ago
- Founder: E. Carolyn Innes and G. David Waldron
- Founded at: Philadelphia, PA
- Dissolved: Early 1980s
- Type: Professional association
- Purpose: To promote the interests of gay and lesbian nurses and their patients
- Region served: United States of America

The Gay Nurses Alliance (GNA) was a professional association founded to promote the interests of gay and lesbian nurses and their patients in the United States. It was the first nursing organization in America with this mission and existed from 1973 through the early 1980s.

== Pre-history and founding ==
In 1972, a panel discussion on homosexuality was held at the American Nurses Association (ANA) convention. The panel focused on the need to overcome stigma against lesbian and gay patients and nurses. Speakers on the panel included two gay nurses and a sociologist, drawing an audience of 2500.

Following that convention, E. Carolyn Innes and G. David Waldron co-founded the Gay Nurses Alliance (GNA) in Philadelphia, Pennsylvania, in August 1973 to advocate for gay patients and nurses and educate health care professionals and others. Encouraged by her mentor Barbara Gittings, Innes approached Waldron with the idea of establishing a gay caucus within the American Nurses Association. Innes had volunteered for the influential lesbian publication The Ladder in the 1950s, and, in 1972, Innes organized the first gay pride parade in Philadelphia alongside Barbara Gittings and Kay Tobin.

== Growth and response ==
In October 1973, GNA members gave the presentation "Gay People/Straight Health Care" at the Pennsylvania Nurses Association conference. Although they were not officially recognized by the association or conference, response to the talk was so positive that they repeated it to another packed room the following morning. A 1974 letter to the American Journal of Nursing from Howard J. Brown, MD, a pioneer of LGBT health, praised GNA as "a beacon of hope to homosexuals".

Chapters of the GNA were established in Boston, Massachusetts, and New York City. Chapter membership fees, combined with personal funds, enabled Innes and Waldron to attend the American Nurses Association Convention in San Francisco. They also began doing numerous speaking engagements, using a slide show created by member Jeri Dilno. Dilno was the photographer and graphic designer for the GNA newsletter THE SIGNAL and the designer of the GNA button. Other key members included Tony Amadeo, who was the head of the Pennsylvania caucus, and Bob Simco, GNA's business manager.

GNA collaborated with other groups, including a conference in Boston on women and health in 1975 that attracted 1500 attendees. In 1977, GNA had its first annual conference and G. David Waldron, GNA's co-founder, was appointed to the ANA's Commission on Human Rights.

Though the organization continued to grow, by 1978 the lack of member involvement prompted John C. Lawrence and Bob Miller, the president and secretary of the GNA, respectively, to consider disbanding unless others stepped forward. By the early 1980s, the Alliance had become defunct.
