= Making Gay History =

LGBT history podcast

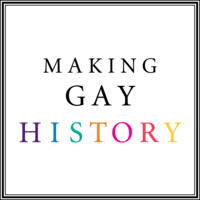
- Genre: LGBTQ oral history
- Language: English

Cast and voices
- Hosted by: Eric Marcus

Technical specifications
- Audio format: Podcast (via streaming or downloadable MP3)

Publication
- No. of seasons: 16
- Original release: October 13, 2016
- Updates: Weekly

Related
- Website: makinggayhistory.org

Making Gay History is an oral history podcast on the subject of LGBT history, featuring trailblazers, activists, and allies. Most episodes draw on the three-decade-old audio archive of rare interviews conducted by the podcast's founder and host Eric Marcus in the late 1980s and 1990s.

== Background ==
Marcus began interviewing notable figures in the LGBTQ civil rights movement in the late 1980s while writing an oral history of the movement. The first edition of the book, published in 1992 under the title Making History: The Struggle for Gay and Lesbian Equal Rights, 1945-1990, was a Stonewall Book Award winner in 1992 and was described by acclaimed oral historian Studs Terkel as "[o]ne of the definitive works on gay life." In the late 1990s, Marcus undertook another round of interviews for the updated second edition of the book, which was titled Making Gay History (2002).

In 2016, Marcus revisited the archive of his original recordings, which had since been digitized by the New York Public Library, along with executive producer Sara Burningham, who suggested that the interviews be used as the basis for a podcast.

Since its launch in October 2016, the podcast has featured interviews with transgender rights icon Sylvia Rivera; pioneering lesbian writer Edythe D. Eyde aka Lisa Ben; American comedian, talk show host, and actress Ellen DeGeneres; popular advice columnist and LGBT advocate Pauline Phillips ("Dear Abby"); and others. It has also drawn on other audio archives to highlight the contributions of activists like Ernestine Eckstein and Bayard Rustin, and has used contemporary interviews to chronicle the life and work of Magnus Hirschfeld and Reed Erickson. In December 2019, they released the earliest known recording of Sylvia Rivera and Marsha P. Johnson.

For the eighth season of the podcast, Marcus partnered with the Studs Terkel Radio Archive to release interviews conducted by the legendary radio host and oral historian Studs Terkel. Marcus cites Terkel and his work as inspiration for his own.

In February 2020, Making Gay History was adapted for the stage at New York University's Steinhardt School of Culture, Education, and Human Development.

The podcast's ninth season, "Coming of Age During the AIDS Crisis," is an audio memoir exploring Marcus's memories of the AIDS epidemic in the 1980s.

== Awards and honors ==
- In September 2017, NBC Out polled its constituents about their "favorite LGBTQ-inclusive podcasts," and Making Gay History was voted #2 out of 11 ranked.
- In October 2017, the Oral History Association honored Making Gay History with its Oral History in a Nonprint Format Award.
- On December 27, 2019, The Atlantic named Making Gay History's Stonewall 50 season one of the best podcasts of 2019.

== Seasons and episodes ==
Season 1	Episode	Date
Episode 1	Sylvia Rivera, Part I	October 13, 2016
Episode 2	Wendell Sayers (called Paul Phillips in the book Making Gay History)	October 20, 2016
Episode 3	Edythe Eyde	October 27, 2016
Episode 4	Dr. Evelyn Hooker	November 3, 2016
Episode 5	Frank Kameny	November 10, 2016
Episode 6	Jeanne & Morty Manford	November 17, 2016
Episode 7	Chuck Rowland	November 23, 2016
Episode 8	Pauline Phillips (Dear Abby)	December 1, 2016
Episode 9	Barbara Gittings & Kay Tobin Lahusen	December 8, 2016
Episode 10	Vito Russo	December 15, 2016
BONUS	Love is Love	February 14, 2017

Season 2	Episode	Date
Episode 1	Marsha P. Johnson & Randy Wicker	March 2, 2017
Episode 2	Shirley Willer	March 9, 2017
Episode 3	Hal Call	March 16, 2017
Episode 4	Jean O'Leary, Part I	March 23, 2017
Episode 5	Jean O'Leary, Part II	March 26, 2017
Episode 6	Morris Foote	March 30, 2017
Episode 7	Herb Selwyn	April 6, 2017
Episode 8	Barbara Gittings & Kay Tobin Lahusen, Part II	April 13, 2017
Episode 9	Evander Smith & Herb Donaldson	April 20, 2017
Episode 10	Joyce Hunter	April 27, 2017
Episode 11	Tom Cassidy	May 4, 2017
BONUS	Rewind: Sylvia Rivera, Part I	October 5, 2017
BONUS	Edythe Eyde's Gay Gal's Mixtape	October 11, 2017

Season 3	Episode	Date
Episode 1	Sylvia Rivera, Part II	October 22, 2017
Episode 2	Perry Watkins	October 26, 2017
Episode 3	Ellen DeGeneres	November 2, 2017
Episode 4	J.J. Belanger	November 9, 2017
Episode 5	Deborah Johnson & Zandra Rolón Amato	November 16, 2017
Episode 6	Larry Kramer	November 23, 2017
Episode 7	Phyllis Lyon & Del Martin	November 30, 2017
Episode 8	Morris Kight	December 7, 2017
Episode 9	Paulette Goodman	December 14, 2017
Episode 10	Greg Brock	December 21, 2017
Episode 11	Morty Manford	December 28, 2017
BONUS	Love Is Love	February 14, 2018
BONUS	Kay Lahusen's Gay Table	June 21, 2018
BONUS	Farewell Dick Leitsch	June 23, 2018

Season 4	Episode	Date
Episode 1	Introduction	October 25, 2018
Episode 2	Magnus Hirschfeld	October 25, 2018
Episode 3	Harry Hay	November 1, 2018
Episode 4	Billye Talmadge	November 15, 2018
Episode 5	Dorr Legg, Martin Block & Jim Kepner of ONE	November 29, 2018
Episode 6	Stella Rush (who wrote under the pseudonym Sten Russell)	December 13, 2018
Episode 7	Reed Erickson	December 27, 2018
Episode 8	Bayard Rustin	January 10, 2019
Episode 9	Ernestine Eckstein	January 24, 2019
Episode 10	Dick Leitsch	February 7, 2019
Episode 11	Martha Shelley	February 21, 2019

Season 5 (Stonewall 50)	Episode	Date
Episode 1	Prelude to a Riot	June 6, 2019
Episode 2	"Everything Clicked... And The Riot Was On"	June 13, 2019
Episode 3	"Say it Loud! Gay and Proud!"	June 20, 2019
Episode 4	Live from Stonewall	June 27, 2019
BONUS	Stonewall 50 Minisode: Marsha P. Johnson & Randy Wicker	June 28, 2019
BONUS	Stonewall 50 Minisode: Morty Manford	June 28, 2019
BONUS	Stonewall 50 Minisode: Barbara Gittings & Kay Lahusen	June 28, 2019
BONUS	Stonewall 50 Minisode: Craig Rodwell	June 28, 2019

Season 6	Episode	Date
Episode 1	Ruth Simpson	October 24, 2019
Episode 2	Vernon E. "Copy" Berg III	November 7, 2019
Episode 3	Barbara Smith	November 21, 2019
Episode 4	Nancy Walker	December 5, 2019
Episode 5	Damien Martin	December 19, 2019
BONUS	From the Vault: Sylvia Rivera & Marsha P. Johnson, 1970	December 27, 2019

Season 7 (Revisiting the Archive)	Episode	Date
Episode 1	Frank Kameny	March 21, 2020
Episode 2	Edythe Eyde	March 28, 2020
Episode 3	Wendell Sayers	April 4, 2020
Episode 4	Shirley Willer	April 11, 2020
Episode 5	Vito Russo	April 18, 2020
Episode 6	Kay Lahusen's Gay Table	April 25, 2020
Episode 7	Ellen DeGeneres	May 2, 2020
Episode 8	Morris Foote	May 9, 2020
Episode 9	Joyce Hunter	May 16, 2020
Episode 10	Perry Watkins	May 23, 2020
Episode 11	Larry Kramer	May 29, 2020
Episode 12	Bayard Rustin	June 7, 2020
Episode 13	Larah Helayne & Jean O'Leary	June 18, 2020

Season 8 (Studs Terkel Radio Archive)	Episode	Date
Episode 1	Christopher Isherwood	October 1, 2020
Episode 2	Lorraine Hansberry	October 15, 2020
Episode 3	John Falk Tomkinson ("Les-Lee")	October 29, 2020
Episode 4	Quentin Crisp	November 12, 2020
Episode 5	Mattachine Midwest (Valerie Taylor)	November 26, 2020
Episode 6	Jill Johnston	December 10, 2020
Episode 7	Leonard Matlovich	December 24, 2020
Episode 8	Meg Christian	January 7, 2021
BONUS	Remembering Kay Lahusen	May 27, 2021

Season 9 (Coming of Age During the AIDS Crisis)	Episode	Date
Chapter 1	Buried Headline	July 1, 2021
Chapter 2	Not Alone	July 15, 2021
Chapter 3	318 West 22nd Street	July 30, 2021
Chapter 4	Complications of AIDS	August 12, 2021
Chapter 5	In or Out	August 27, 2021
Chapter 6	Making History	September 10, 2021

Season 10	Episode	Date
Episode 1	Randy Shilts	February 24, 2022
Episode 2	Dr. Ronald Grossman	March 3, 2022
Episode 3	Sara Boesser	March 10, 2022
Episode 4	Randy Boyd	March 17, 2022
Episode 5	Ann Northrop	March 24, 2022
Episode 6	Michelle Lopez	March 31, 2022
BONUS	Rewind: Stonewall 50: Episode 1: Prelude to a Riot	June 2, 2022
BONUS	Rewind: Stonewall 50: Episode 2: "Everything Clicked...And the Riot Was On"	June 9, 2022
BONUS	Rewind: Stonewall 50: Episode 3: "Say It Loud! Gay & Proud!"	June 16, 2022
BONUS	Rewind: Stonewall 50: Episode 4: Live from Stonewall	June 23, 2022

Season 11	Episode	Date
Episode 1	Craig Rodwell	November 3, 2022
Episode 2	Rev. Carolyn Mobley-Bowie	November 10, 2022
Episode 3	Faygele Ben-Miriam	November 17, 2022
Episode 4	Urvashi Vaid	November 24, 2022
Episode 5	Robert Bauman	December 1, 2022
Episode 6	Kathleen Boatwright	December 8, 2022
BONUS	A Complicated Love Story	February 14, 2023

Season 12 (Coming of Age During the 1970s)	Episode	Date
Chapter 1	A Surge of Energy	April 13, 2023
Chapter 2	Fire Island and Other Stories	April 27, 2023
Chapter 3	Family Ties	May 11, 2023
Chapter 4	Respectable	May 25, 2023
Chapter 5	Thank You, Anita	June 8, 2023
Chapter 6	Marching On	June 29, 2023

Season 13 (Dismantling a Diagnosis)	Episode	Date
Episode 1	A Kind of Madness	December 15, 2023
Episode 2	The Cure	December 22, 2023
Episode 3	Out of the DSM & into the Present - A Conversation about LGBTQ+ Mental Health	December 29, 2023
GUEST	Blindspot: The Plague in the Shadows: Mourning in America	February 15, 2024
BONUS	Feminist Bookstores: A Love Story - with June Thomas	May 23, 2024

Season 14 (The Nazi Era)	Episode	Date
Episode 1	Prologue	January 27, 2025
Episode 2	Overview, Part I	January 30, 2025
Episode 3	Overview, Part II	February 6, 2025
Episode 4	Stefan Kosinski	February 13, 2025
Episode 5	Pierre Seel	February 20, 2025
Episode 6	Frieda Belinfante	February 27, 2025
Episode 7	Gad Beck	March 6, 2025
Episode 8	Lucy Salani	March 13, 2025
Episode 9	Margot Heuman	March 20, 2025
Episode 10	Kenneth Roman	March 27, 2025
Episode 11	Fredy Hirsch	April 3, 2025
Episode 12	Epilogue	April 10, 2025

Season 15 (Voices from the Archives)	Episode	Date
Episode 1	Christine Jorgensen	June 18, 2026
Episode 2	Mabel Hampton	June 25, 2026
Episode 3	Pat Bond	July 2, 2026
Episode 4	Jim Kepner	July 9, 2026
Episode 5	Nancy May	July 16, 2026
Episode 6	Barney Frank	July 23, 2026
Episode 7	Lou Sullivan	July 30, 2026

Season 16 (The Queens of Welfare Island)	Episode	Date
Episode 1	Island of Misfits	October 19, 2026
Episode 2	Let's All Be Fairies	October 26, 2026
Episode 3	King of the Clam House	November 9, 2026

== See also ==
- List of LGBT podcasts
