= The David Susskind Show =

- Also known as: Open End (1958–1967)
- Genre: Talk show
- Presented by: David Susskind
- Country of origin: United States
- Original language: English
- No. of seasons: 29

Production
- Production company: Pamandia

Original release
- Network: WNTA (1958–1961); Syndicated/WNEW-TV (1961–1986)
- Release: 1958 – 1986

The David Susskind Show is an American television talk show hosted by David Susskind which was broadcast from 1958 to 1986. The program began locally in New York City in 1958 as Open End, which referred to the fact that the program was open-ended, with no set scheduled end or timeslot restrictions. In this form, the program would continue until Susskind or his guests had felt the conversation had run its full course, or were exhausted and ended the episode by mutual agreement.

== Overview ==
Open End was launched in 1958 and aired initially in New York over independent station WNTA-TV. Susskind's interview of Soviet Premier Nikita Khrushchev, which aired on October 9, 1960, during the height of the Cold War, generated national attention. Susskind and Khrushchev discussed Soviet-U.S. relations, state sovereignty, the United Nations, the unification of Germany, and other topics in world affairs. It is one of the very few talk show telecasts from that era that was preserved and can be viewed today.

In 1961, Open End moved to WPIX after WNTA-TV ended commercial operations in preparation to become WNET, New York's main noncommercial educational outlet. Susskind continued with the program before ending Open End in the summer of 1966.

Susskind launched his new program, The David Susskind Show in October 1966 with another New York independent station, WNEW-TV as its base. The new effort was also syndicated, as WNEW-TV utilized its sister Metromedia stations to expand the program's reach before a national rollout. Susskind did a two-hour interview including commercials with Martin Luther King Jr. in 1963, two months before the civil rights leader delivered his "I Have a Dream" speech. The New York Times reported what it considered the highlight of the interview on its front page: "The civil rights approach of the Kennedy Administration as compared with that of the Eisenhower Administration has merely substituted 'an inadequate approach for a miserable one,' the Rev. Dr. Martin Luther King Jr. declared yesterday." Few people have seen the video, which belongs to Historic Films Archive, since 1963.

The title of Susskind's talk show was changed from Open End to The David Susskind Show for its telecast on Sunday night, October 2, 1966. Shows would occasionally tape in Los Angeles, at the studios of KCOP-TV.

On October 10, 1971, the show invited seven lesbian women to be on a panel for a segment called "Women Who Love Women”. The lesbians included Barbara Gittings, Lilli Vincenz, and Barbara Love. They were among the first open lesbians to appear on television in the US, and debated long-held stereotypes about gays with Susskind. This segment is remembered for Gittings saying, "Homosexuals today are taking it for granted that their homosexuality is not at all something dreadful – it’s good, it’s right, it’s natural, it’s moral, and this is the way they are going to be!".

In May 1973, to acknowledge Digestive Disease Week, the show invited three gastroenterologists to discuss therapies for peptic ulcer. Viewer William Dufty had bet that "These three distinguished specialists could go on for the entire ninety minutes without ever mentioning the word sugar." Afterward he noted, "In ninety minutes, they were unable to come up with a single constructive suggestion for the average person to manage their diet in a way that might prevent ulcers."

A December 16, 1981 debate on chiropractic had as participants, among others, Stephen Barrett, a psychiatrist, consumer activist, medical writer and skeptic nowadays mostly known as the webmaster of Quackwatch, and Chester Wilk, a chiropractor who was the plaintiff in Wilk v. American Medical Ass'n.

The show continued until September 1986, at which point WNEW-TV, now under the ownership of Rupert Murdoch's News Corporation and beginning the transition to being the flagship of the new commercial network Fox, had moved the program to an late Sunday-to-early Monday timeslot, albeit still filling two hours. Susskind chose to end the program himself, six months before his death from a heart attack.

As the successor to Metromedia and WNEW-TV, Fox and WNYW maintain much of the series' archives. Edited segments of the show aired on weekends on Fox News Channel in the early 2000s, with wraparounds hosted by Paula Zahn.
