= Dr. Franklin E. Kameny House =

Historic house in Washington, D.C., United States

- U.S. National Register of Historic Places
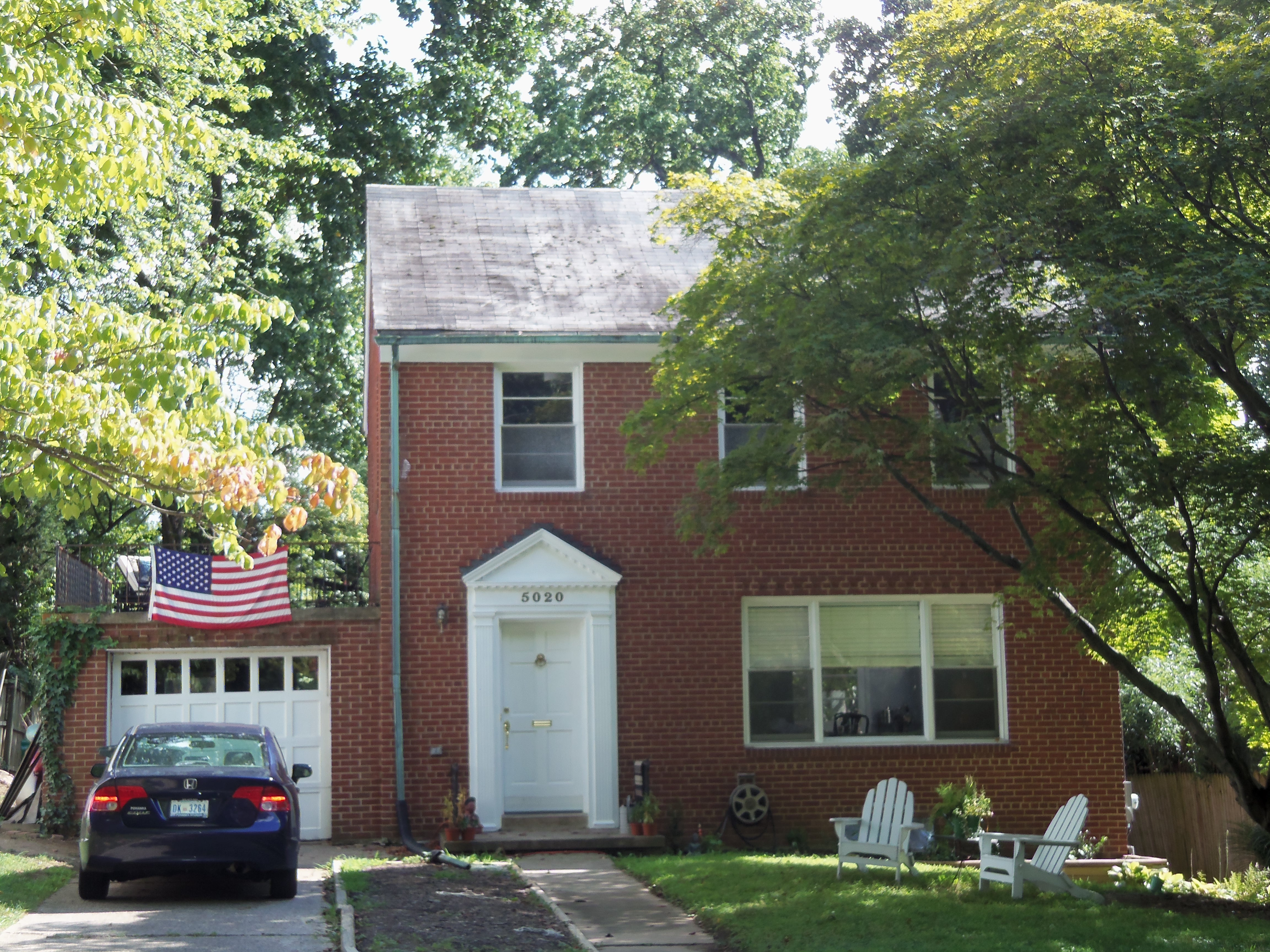
- Dr. Franklin E. Kameny House, August 2012

- Location within District of Columbia
- Location: 5020 Cathedral Ave., NW; Washington, D.C.
- Coordinates: 38°55′48″N 77°6′8″W
- Area: .14 acres (570 m^{2})
- Built: 1955
- Architectural style: Colonial Revival
- NRHP reference No.: 11000773
- Added to NRHP: November 2, 2011

The Dr. Franklin E. Kameny House in the Northwest Quadrant of Washington, D.C., is a two-story, brick Colonial Revival-style house built in 1955, with a screened porch and a one-car garage. It is significant for its association with gay rights activist Franklin E. Kameny (1925–2011), having served as his home and office, and as a headquarters for gay civil rights organizing.

== History ==
Kameny, who is said to have "spear-headed the new militancy in the gay rights movement," moved to Washington in the 1950s. He was fired from the US Army's Map Service in 1957 because he was gay. Kameny went on to co-found the Mattachine Society of Washington and is considered the father of gay activism. Kameny moved into the house in 1962, and it remained his residence for nearly 40 years. According to the National Park Service, the Kameny House

served as a meeting place, archives, informal counseling center, headquarters of the Mattachine Society, and a safe haven for visiting gay and lesbian activists. It was here that Dr. Franklin E. Kameny developed the civil rights strategies and tactics that have come to define the modern gay rights movement.

According to The Washington Post staff writer, Petula Dvorak, it was from his house on Cathedral Avenue that Kameny led his campaign against sodomy laws, helped overturn the American Psychiatric Association's definition of homosexuality as a mental illness, lobbied against the federal government's refusal to grant security clearances to homosexuals, and became "the first openly gay candidate to run for Congress".

In 2009, the building was designated as a D.C. Historic Landmark, because, "for 13 fiery years, it was the epicenter of the gay rights movement in the nation's capital." The designation was considered unusual at the time, because Kameny was still alive and living in the house at the time of its landmark designation. On November 2, 2011, the building was also listed on the U.S. National Register of Historic Places. The listing was announced as the featured listing in the National Park Service's weekly list. The nomination, written in 2006, stated that it was unusual as a NRHP nomination in that the person for whom the property is significant was still alive. Kameny died at his home on October 11, 2011, less than a month before the house was finally listed on the NRHP.

== See also ==
- List of LGBT monuments and memorials
