= Kay Lahusen =

American photographer, writer, and activist (1930–2021)

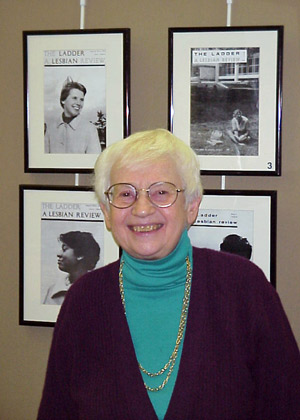
- Lahusen in 2001, in front of her images on The Ladder
- Born: Katherine Lahusen; January 5, 1930; Cincinnati, Ohio, U.S.
- Died: May 26, 2021 (aged 91); Chester County, Pennsylvania
- Other names: Kay Tobin; Kay Tobin Lahusen
- Occupations: Photographer, activist, writer, real estate agent
- Organization(s): Co-founder, Gay Activists Alliance (GAA)
- Partner: Barbara Gittings (1961–2007)

Katherine Lahusen (also known as Kay Tobin; January 5, 1930 – May 26, 2021) was an American photographer, writer and gay rights activist. She was the first openly lesbian American photojournalist. Under Lahusen's art direction, photographs of lesbians appeared on the cover of The Ladder for the first time. It was one of many projects she undertook with partner Barbara Gittings, who was then The Ladder's editor. As an activist, Lahusen was involved with the founding of the Gay Activists Alliance (GAA) in 1970 and the removal of homosexuality from the American Psychiatric Association's Diagnostic and Statistical Manual of Mental Disorders (DSM). She contributed writing and photographs to a New York–based Gay Newsweekly and Come Out!, and co-authored two books: The Gay Crusaders in 1972 with Randy Wicker (under her pen name Kay Tobin) and Love and Resistance: Out of the Closet into the Stonewall Era, collecting their photographs with Diana Davies in 2019.

== Early life ==
Katherine Lahusen was born on January 5, 1930, in Cincinnati, Ohio. She was brought up by her grandparents, George and Katherine (Walker) Lahusen. She developed her interest in photography as a child. "Even as a kid I liked using a little box camera and pushing it and trying to get something artsy out of it", she recalled. She attended Withrow High School, graduating in 1948. As a teenager she noticed her attraction to women, via crushes on stars like Katharine Hepburn, and went to Ohio State University with a girlfriend. Lahusen studied English and planned to become a teacher; meanwhile, the relationship lasted six years. Lahusen graduated in 1952 and they moved in together, but her girlfriend ultimately left "in order to marry and have a normal life", leaving Lahusen devastated by the loss.

== Career ==
Lahusen spent the next six years in Boston working in the reference library of The Christian Science Monitor. After a psychiatrist specializing in gay clients showed her a copy of the lesbian magazine The Ladder (published by the Daughters of Bilitis), she reached out to the organization and met Barbara Brooks Gittings at a Daughters of Bilitis picnic in 1961. They became a couple and Lahusen moved to Philadelphia to be with Gittings. When Gittings took over The Ladder in 1963, Lahusen became art director, and made it a priority to improve the quality of art on the covers. Where previously there were simple line drawings, characterized by Lahusen as "pretty bland, little cats, insipid human figures," Lahusen began to add photographs of real lesbians on the cover beginning in September 1964. The first showed two women from the back, on a beach looking out to sea. But Lahusen really wanted to add full-face portraits of lesbians. "If you go around as if you don't dare show your face, it sends forth a terrible message", Lahusen remembered.

Several covers showed various women willing to pose in profile, or in sunglasses, but by the mid-1960s Lahusen was able to persuade some women to have their faces shown on the cover, including Lilli Vincenz, who had been discharged from the military when she was outed, and Ernestine Eckstein, an African American lesbian activist who picketed the White House in 1965. By the end of Gittings' period as editor, Lahusen remembered there was a waiting list of women who wanted to be full-face on the cover of the magazine. She wrote articles in The Ladder under the name Kay Tobin, a name she picked out of the phone book, and which she found was easier for people to pronounce.

Lahusen photographed Gittings and other people who picketed federal buildings and Independence Hall in the mid- to late- 1960s. She contributed photographs and articles to a Manhattan newspaper called Gay Newsweekly, and worked in New York City's Oscar Wilde Memorial Bookstore, the first bookstore devoted to better literature on gay themes, and to disseminating materials that promoted a gay political agenda. She worked with Gittings in the gay caucus of the American Library Association, and photographed thousands of activists, marches, and events in the 1960s and 1970s. Frank Kameny and Jack Nichols and many other gay activists became her subjects.

Lahusen participated in activism via organizing as well as art. In the 1960s she held and photographed "Annual Reminder" pickets in front of Independence Hall in Philadelphia on the Fourth of July. In 1970, Lahusen was part of the founding of the original Gay Activists Alliance, and in 1972 worked to push the American Psychological Association (APA) to remove homosexuality from its Diagnostic and Statistical Manual of Mental Disorders. As part of the latter, she also photographed John E. Fryer wearing the disguise he donned to protect his reputation when he addressed the APA convention as a gay psychiatrist. Homosexuality was dropped as a diagnosis the following year. Recalling her work from the perspective of 2021, Kevin Jennings, head of Lambda Legal, said, "It is impossible to overstate Kay’s importance in the struggle for LGBT rights and dignity."

== Later life ==
In the 1980s Lahusen became involved in real estate, and placed ads in gay papers. She also organized agents to get them to march in the New York City Pride March. More recently, her photographs were featured in exhibits at the William Way LGBT Community Center in Philadelphia and the Wilmington Institute Library in Delaware.

In 2007, all of Lahusen's photos and writings and Gittings' papers and writings were donated to the New York Public Library. Lahusen and Gittings were together for 46 years when Gittings died of breast cancer on February 18, 2007, aged 74. Lahusen was working on collecting her photographs for a photography scrapbook on the history of the gay rights movement when Gittings' illness put the plans on hold. In 2015, she collaborated with Tracy Baim who wrote a biography of Gittings called Barbara Gittings, gay pioneer, illustrated with Lahusen's photographs. The same year, Lahusen appeared on the podium at a Philadelphia event celebrating both the history and future of gay rights, soon after the Supreme Court ruling that legalized same-sex marriage. In 2019, she and Diana Davies published Love and Resistance: Out of the Closet into the Stonewall Era, collecting their photographs. A review in The Guardian described the collection as "priceless pictures of LGBTQ pioneers".

Until shortly before her death, Lahusen resided in Kennett Square, Pennsylvania, in an assisted living facility. She died at Chester County Hospital, Pennsylvania, on May 26, 2021, after a brief illness. She was 91. A plot of land at the Congressional Cemetery in Washington, D.C., next to the burial place of Gittings has been allotted to Lahusen. The ashes of both will be interred inside a stone bench engraved with the motto they helped popularize: "Gay is good."

== Legacy ==
In 2016, a historical marker was placed at 21st and Locust Streets in Philadelphia, near the apartment Gittings and Lahusen shared in the 1960s; the marker describes Gittings' work in LGBT rights in Philadelphia. Two episodes from the podcast Making Gay History feature Lahusen and Gittings, and a bonus episode of that podcast is about Lahusen's monthly dinner meetings with other gay people.

== Books ==
- The Gay Crusaders, as Kay Tobin, with Randy Wicker (1972)
- Love and Resistance: Out of the Closet into the Stonewall Era, collecting their photographs, with Diana Davies (2019)
