= The Ladder (magazine) =

First nationally distributed lesbian publication in the US (1956–1972)

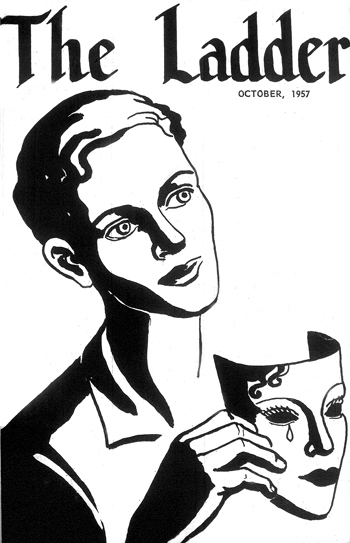
- The Ladder, October 1957
- Editor: Phyllis Lyon; Del Martin; Barbara Gittings; Helen Sandoz; Barbara Grier
- Categories: News magazine
- Frequency: Monthly, later bimonthly
- Publisher: Daughters of Bilitis
- First issue: October 1956; 69 years ago
- Final issue: September 1972; 53 years ago
- Country: United States
- Based in: San Francisco
- Language: English
- ISSN: 0023-7108
- OCLC: 2263409

The Ladder was the first nationally distributed lesbian publication in the United States. Published from 1956 to 1972 (bimonthly in 1971 and 1972), The Ladder was the primary monthly publication and method of communication for the Daughters of Bilitis (DOB), the first lesbian organization in the US. It was supported by ONE, Inc. and the Mattachine Society, with whom the DOB retained friendly relations. The name of the magazine was derived from the artwork on its first cover, simple line drawings showing figures moving towards a ladder that disappeared into the clouds.

The DOB disbanded in 1970 due to internal disputes, and two of the magazine's original editors joined the National Organization for Women and encouraged the readers of The Ladder to do the same. The DOB president Rita LaPorte took possession of the 3,800-member mailing list of the magazine and effectively took over the magazine as well. LaPorte and Barbara Grier continued to publish it until September 1972 when they ran out of funds. There was a controversy about the unauthorized use of the mailing list, with claims that it was stolen.

== History ==
The first lesbian publication in the United States was a newsletter called Vice Versa, subtitled "America's Gayest Magazine". It was created and edited by a secretary named Edith Eyde (using the pseudonym Lisa Ben, an anagram of "lesbian") in Los Angeles, and distributed privately in that area from 1947 to 1948.

The first edition of The Ladder appeared in October 1956, edited by Phyllis Lyon, who co-founded the Daughters of Bilitis (DOB) in 1955 with Del Martin, both of whom had journalism experience. Many of its contributors used pseudonyms or initials. Lyon edited The Ladder as "Ann Ferguson" for the first few months, but dropped the name as a way of encouraging their readers not to hide. The first issues of the magazine averaged 20 pages with each issue increasing in length from 12 pages to 30 pages by the end of the first volume. A volunteer staff produced each issue on a typewriter, copied by a mimeograph, and hand stapled. It included book reviews, news, poetry, short stories, a running bibliography of lesbian literature, letters from readers, and updates from DOB meetings. In 1959 it took a rare political stance against San Francisco mayoral candidate Russel Wolden who criticized incumbent mayor George Christopher's making the city a haven for "sex deviants." The Ladder was issued in a brown paper covering for the duration of its existence. There were 175 copies of the first issue, and members of the DOB mailed them to every woman they knew who might be interested, including woman professionals in the San Francisco telephone book, and others throughout the United States. It soon became available in newsstands in major cities and by subscription, obtained by word of mouth.

By October 1957, there were 400 subscribers on the mailing list. An early respondent to the magazine was playwright Lorraine Hansberry, writing a letter of thanks in May 1957 signed "L.H.N", offering $2.00 US for any back issues, and stating she was "glad as heck that you exist." Lyon published her entire letter, taking up two of the 30 pages of that issue. Historian Marcia Gallo wrote of The Ladder, "For women who came across a copy in the early days, The Ladder was a lifeline. It was a means of expressing and sharing otherwise private thoughts and feelings, of connecting across miles and disparate daily lives, of breaking through isolation and fear." While Gallo's assertion is supported by the publicized letters in the magazine, the letters left unpublished criticized the magazine on format, purpose, and content as ineffective.

=== Changes ===
In 1963 Barbara Gittings took over editing The Ladder, giving it a more politically urgent stance and adding "A Lesbian Review" under the title of the magazine. The line drawings on the cover were replaced with photographs of lesbians, to make them more visible. The first woman who appeared in a photograph on the cover in May 1964 was an unnamed model. The first woman who allowed her name to be printed was from Indonesia who had sent her picture and a letter explaining how isolated she was. Except for the first two covers, the rest of the portraits that appeared on the cover of The Ladder were shot by Gittings' partner, Kay Lahusen. The January 1966 cover with Lahusen's photo of Lilli Vincenz was the first to feature a named model without sunglasses or in profile view. By 1966, Gittings remembered, there was a list of women who were willing to lend their photo and their name to the cover. The improvement of the production quality in the magazine was evident due in large part to a monthly donation of $100,000 the DOB received from a source they knew only as "Pennsylvania" that was spread out between 1963 and 1969.

Gittings was allied with Frank Kameny of the Mattachine Society and used his writings often in The Ladder. With Kameny and other members of the Washington D.C. Mattachine Society, Gittings began picketing high-profile locations such as the White House and the State Department, and reported on the picketing sessions, encouraging others to do so in The Ladder. Differences in the direction of politics became an issue, and Gittings was ousted as the editor in 1966. One source claims it occurred after removing "For Adults Only" on the front cover neglecting to consult the Daughters of Bilitis, although another source says Gittings was ousted for getting too many issues out late.

One of the earliest members of the Daughters of Bilitis, Helen Sandoz, took over the editorship, returning to a more apolitical and lighthearted stance, sometimes writing her editorials as her cat. Barbara Grier took over as editor in 1968, having previously contributed to the magazine under a variety of pseudonyms that included Gene Damon, Lennox Strong, and Vern Niven. She made her most significant contribution as a book reviewer, and when she became the editor sought to make it more professional. It received a smoother layout with more material—the second issue under Grier was 48 pages. Although the headquarters for The Ladder was in San Francisco, Grier ran the magazine long distance from Kansas City. She tripled the subscription rate by removing "lesbian" from the cover to address more feminist issues.

=== Controversy about the ownership of the mailing list ===
In 1970, the DOB disbanded due to organizational problems, disagreements about aligning themselves with homophile organizations composed predominantly of gay men, and supporting the growing feminist movement. Del Martin and Phyllis Lyon had joined the National Organization for Women and encouraged readers of The Ladder to do the same. Younger members who were sparked by more confrontational methods of protest, did not agree with some of the older members' ideas. Concerned that the magazine would be lost due to the lack of direction in the national organization, DOB president Rita LaPorte took possession of the 3,800-member mailing list for The Ladder (of which there were only two copies, the subject of which was an annual article to assure women that their names were safe) to Reno without the knowledge of Martin and Lyons, and she and Barbara Grier continued to publish it until September 1972 when they ran out of funds. When The Ladder severed its ties with the DOB, the anonymous donations to assist the magazine stopped. A controversy arose between Del Martin and Phyllis Lyons, Barbara Gittings, and Helen Sandoz who maintained the mailing list was stolen, and Grier who stated taking the list was necessary to keep a dying organization alive.

In 1975, Arno Press released a nine-volume compilation of The Ladder in hardback as part of their series "Lesbians and Gay Men in Society, History, and Literature" with a short foreword by Barbara Grier. Speaking to journalist and historian Rodger Streitmatter about The Ladder, Grier commented that "no woman ever made a dime for her work, and some ... worked themselves into a state of mental and physical decline on behalf of the magazine." She felt that "most of (the editors) believed that they were moving the world with their labors, and I believe that they were right".

== Content ==
In 1956, the Daughters of Bilitis wrote their mission statement, which was printed on the inside of every cover of the magazine until 1970:

1. Education of the variant...to enable her to understand herself and make her adjustment to society...this to be accomplished by establishing...a library...on the sex deviant theme; by sponsoring public discussions...to be conducted by leading members of the legal psychiatric, religious and other professions; by advocating a mode of behavior and dress acceptable to society.
2. Education of the public...leading to an eventual breakdown of erroneous taboos and prejudices...
3. Participation in research projects by duly authorized and responsible psychologists, sociologists, and other such experts directed towards further knowledge of the homosexual.
4. Investigation of the penal code as it pertain to the homosexual, proposal of changes,...and promotion of these changes through the due process of law in the state legislatures."

=== Education of the variant ===
From the beginning, The Ladder sought to reach out to women who were isolated by assuring them in essays and editorials that they were not alone. It also sought to educate women about legal issues—the Daughters of Bilitis stood to serve women as a social alternative to bars, where gays were frequently arrested in the 1950s. Contributions often featured essays on famous lesbians and bisexual women throughout history such as Radclyffe Hall, Queen Christina, and Renée Vivien.

Contributions by attorneys, psychiatrists, and doctors were common as were advice columns on how to raise children while being a "deviant". Marion Zimmer Bradley offered advice on whether to stay married after one knows she is a lesbian. And the issue of marriage was brought up again in 1959 when The Ladder reported on a panel discussion sponsored by the Daughters of Bilitis that debated if marriage could cure homosexuality, all opinions of psychotherapists at hand saying that it could not, and one offering that it was not to be cured as it was not a disease. A 1957 column featuring a psychotherapist who offered his opinion on how one determines the source of lesbians' fear of men: "The basic problem in evaluating your personal problems is to find out why you are shying away from sexual relations with men. In other words, the problem is not why you like women, but why you don't like men." Forrest J Ackerman wrote two articles under his pseudonym LauraJean Ermayne (normally used for writing lesbian pulp fiction) and was declared an "honorary lesbian" for his contributions.

The Daughters of Bilitis also sponsored presentations on how to accept oneself as homosexual in an overwhelming negative society. "Many creative fields lie ahead of you IF you will stop despising yourselves, stop being ashamed and start creating a place for yourselves on this earth. It is not inconceivable. There are societies in the past which allowed homosexuals their place," said one visiting psychotherapist.

==== The Ladder vs. Ann Aldrich ====
Poetry submissions began almost immediately, as did short story submissions with lesbian themes. Book reviews of current paperbacks were regular features, including a heated exchange in print between contributors to The Ladder and author Marijane Meaker as Ann Aldrich from 1957 to 1963. Meaker had written the immensely successful Spring Fire in 1952 under the name Vin Packer and was known to the Daughters of Bilitis. Meaker's books We Walk Alone from 1955 and We, Too, Must Love from 1958 were her version of Donald Webster Cory's The Homosexual in America, a nonfiction account published in 1951 about what it was like to live as a gay man in the US. Meaker's books, published by Gold Medal Books, were distributed all over the US, and gave people in remote places an idea of what it was like to live as a lesbian. The books, however, were not particularly sympathetic to lesbians, and Del Martin and Barbara Grier took issue with Meaker's portrayals. They began to criticize the books in The Ladder and suggest that Meaker was expressing self-hatred in the books. Del Martin wrote to Meaker personally in 1958, giving her a free subscription to the magazine. Meaker's reach to women was much broader through the distribution of her books, and she received so much mail from women asking for resources and support that she was unable to respond to all of it, so she referred the letter writers to the Daughters of Bilitis. However, in print, Meaker responded to the open letters to her in The Ladder in her next book Carol in a Thousand Cities in 1960, by skewering the magazine's amateurish homemade appearance, fiction and poetry she did not appreciate, and the ideas presented in the magazine. Again, The Ladder responded, once more calling Meaker's loyalties into question. However negative Carol in a Thousand Cities was to The Ladder, it was major advertising for the DOB and letters poured in for them from all over the U.S.

=== Gender expression ===
The Daughters of Bilitis initially approached relations between lesbians and the heterosexual society at large by promoting assimilation as much as possible, in the hopes that heterosexuals would see that lesbians were not drastically different from themselves. The debate about the appropriateness and impact of women exhibiting masculine dress and behavior was carried out in the pages of The Ladder. "The kids in the fly-front pants and with the butch haircuts and mannish manner are the worst publicity we can get", wrote one reader in 1956, to which DOB President D. Griffin responded, "Our organization has already touched on that matter and converted a few to remembering that they are women first and a butch for fem secondly, so their attire should be that which society will accept. Contrary to belief, we have shown them that there is a place for them in society, but only if they wish to make it so."

In June 1957 a defense of some women's choice to wear pants was published under the title, "Transvestism—A Cross-Cultural Survey". The November issue of the same year reprinted editorial sections from The San Francisco Examiner and the San Francisco Chronicle that begged women not to wear pants: "When ladies young and old wear sloppy slacks or tight pants on Market St. I wish I had a water pistol and could give each one of them a good squirt. Ladies, please be ladies." However, in the same issue, an essay encouraged women to broaden their definition of femininity: "Of course we can (accept our femininity) if only we enlarge our view to include all women: the gentle, the shy the brave, the meek, the enterprising, the flamboyant..." The issue of pants was brought up again in 1959 with the reprint of a UPI story stating the women in pants was to become fashionable that year, and again when Gene Damon wrote an overview of women who had lived as men throughout Western history.

When the Daughters of Bilitis or the Mattachine Society had a convention, the news was reported. The magazine compiled some of the first statistics about lesbians in the United States by sending their readership questionnaires, the first in 1957 and again in 1963. There was a marked difference in the tone of the magazine after Barbara Gittings heard Frank Kameny speak at the national DOB convention that attempting to find the cause of homosexuality was a waste of time since it was equal to heterosexuality. Many articles from 1956 to 1963 focused on ways to function in an overwhelmingly homophobic world, but gradually articles began to appear that were unapologetic in promoting lesbianism.

After Barbara Grier took over, artwork began to appear on the cover from artists such as Romaine Brooks and Georgia O'Keeffe. Contributions by writers included articles by Jane Rule, Martha Shelley, and Rita Mae Brown.

=== Ernestine Eckstein ===
Much of what is known about Ernestine Eckstein's beliefs and life is taken from an interview in The Ladder in June 1966. Eckstein was one of two women of color to be featured on the cover of the magazine. The importance of Eckstein's issue of The Ladder should not be underestimated: "Her image on the cover, and her ideas throughout the pages of The Ladder, helped greatly to complicate notions of the kinds of women who were involved in DOB and expanded definitions of lesbian identity". Her coverage in The Ladder is the only known published piece that substantially features Eckstein.

== See also ==
- List of lesbian periodicals
- Vice Versa (magazine)
