= Lilli Vincenz =

American gay rights activist (1937–2023)

- On the cover of The Ladder, January 1966
- Born: September 26, 1937; Hamburg, Germany
- Died: June 27, 2023 (aged 85)
- Known for: The Mattachine Society

Lilli Vincenz (September 26, 1937 – June 27, 2023) was a German-born American lesbian activist and the first lesbian member of the gay political activist effort, the Mattachine Society of Washington (MSW).

Vincenz served as the editor of the organization's newsletter and in 1969, along with Nancy Tucker, created the independent newspaper, the Gay Blade, which later became the Washington Blade.

Vincenz invited women to meet every week at her home in Arlington County, Virginia in the Columbia Heights West neighborhood from 1971 to 1979 to create a safe venue for gay women to discuss gay activism and other lesbian-related issues, and her home became known as the Gay Women's Open House (GWOH). These meetings became the Gay Women's Alternative. The weekly gatherings allowed lesbians, bisexuals, and women questioning their sexuality to meet in comfort and safety. She described her decision in an interview:

I decided to have women come into our home every week for seven years, and it just become an establishment. And it was wonderful to have them come, and we had musicians come ... lots of women who didn't know where to go, they didn't want to go to the bars, they just wanted to be in a place that was safe, so we provided that.

Gay and Proud, a 1970 film by Vincenz documenting the first Christopher Street Liberation Day

Vincenz was the only self-identified lesbian to participate in the second White House picket with Frank Kameny in 1965. A January 1966 photograph of Vincenz, taken by Kay Lahusen, appeared on the cover of the lesbian magazine The Ladder, making her the first woman with her face showing to do so. In 1972, Vincenz and Kameny headed one of the first LGBTQ+ fundraising groups for a presidential candidate, Gay Citizens for McGovern.

Vincenz made an appearance on PBS' David Susskind Show in 1971, along with six other lesbians, including Barbara Gittings and Barbara Love. They were among the first open lesbians to appear on television in the US, and debated long-held stereotypes about gays with Susskind. Vincenz and Gittings had also appeared on the Phil Donahue show in 1970.

In 2013, her papers, films, and other memorabilia were donated to the Library of Congress.

Vincenz died on June 27, 2023, at the age of 85.
