= John E. Fryer =

Psychiatrist and gay activist (1937–2003)

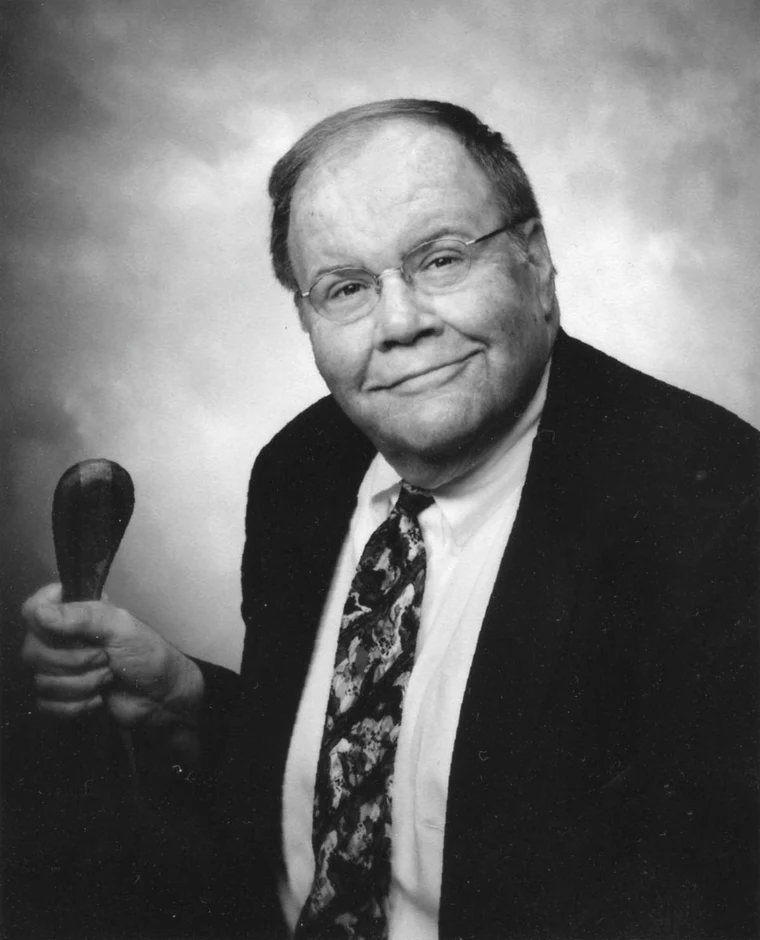
- Born: November 7, 1937; Winchester, Kentucky, U.S.
- Died: February 21, 2003 (aged 65); Philadelphia, Pennsylvania, U.S.
- Education: Transylvania University Vanderbilt University
- Known for: His role in persuading the American Psychiatric Association to remove homosexuality from the Diagnostic and Statistical Manual of Mental Disorders
- Awards: Distinguished Service Award from the Association of Gay and Lesbian Psychiatrists
- Scientific career
- Fields: Psychiatry
- Workplaces: Temple University

John Ercel Fryer (November 7, 1937 – February 21, 2003) was a prominent American psychiatrist and advocate for gay rights. He is most notably remembered for his impactful speech, delivered anonymously at the 1972 American Psychiatric Association (APA) annual conference. Fryer addressed the conference under the pseudonym Dr. Henry Anonymous, catalyzing the movement to remove homosexuality as a classified mental illness from the APA Diagnostic and Statistical Manual of Mental Disorders. In recognition of his significant contributions, the APA established the "John E. Fryer, M.D., Award" in his honor.

== Early life ==
Fryer was born in Winchester, Kentucky, to Katherine Zempter Fryer and Ercel Ray Fryer. Displaying remarkable academic prowess, he was already attending second grade by the age of five. Graduating from high school at the age of 15, he swiftly earned a bachelor's degree from Transylvania University in Lexington, Kentucky, where he was an active member of the Phi Kappa Tau fraternity. In 1962, he attained his medical degree from Vanderbilt University in Nashville, Tennessee, followed by a medical internship at Ohio State University. His psychiatric residency commenced at the Menninger Foundation in Topeka, Kansas, but he withdrew from it upon the advice of a psychoanalyst due to depressions, likely stemming from the need to conceal his homosexuality. He later criticized the Menninger Foundation for its considerable homophobia. Relocating to Philadelphia, he pursued a residency at the University of Pennsylvania, but faced discrimination due to his sexual orientation, leading him to complete his residency at Norristown State Hospital in 1967.

In the mid-1960s, Fryer started getting referrals from Alfred A. Gross, who was the Executive Secretary of the George W. Henry Foundation. Established in 1948 by Gross and Henry, the foundation aimed to assist individuals "who by reason of sexual deviation are in trouble with themselves, the law, or society." Fryer was tasked with treating homosexual entangled in legal issues and providing court testimony on their behalf.

In 1967, Fryer became a member of the medical faculty at Temple University in Philadelphia. By January 1969, he held the position of instructor in psychiatry at the institution. Engaging in community health initiatives in North Philadelphia, he played a pivotal role in the Health Care and Human Values Task Force. Utilizing a $5,000 grant, he established a group named "Ars Moriendi" to address issues surrounding professional responses to death and dying. This initiative eventually evolved into the International Work Group on Death, Dying, and Bereavement.

== 1972 speech ==
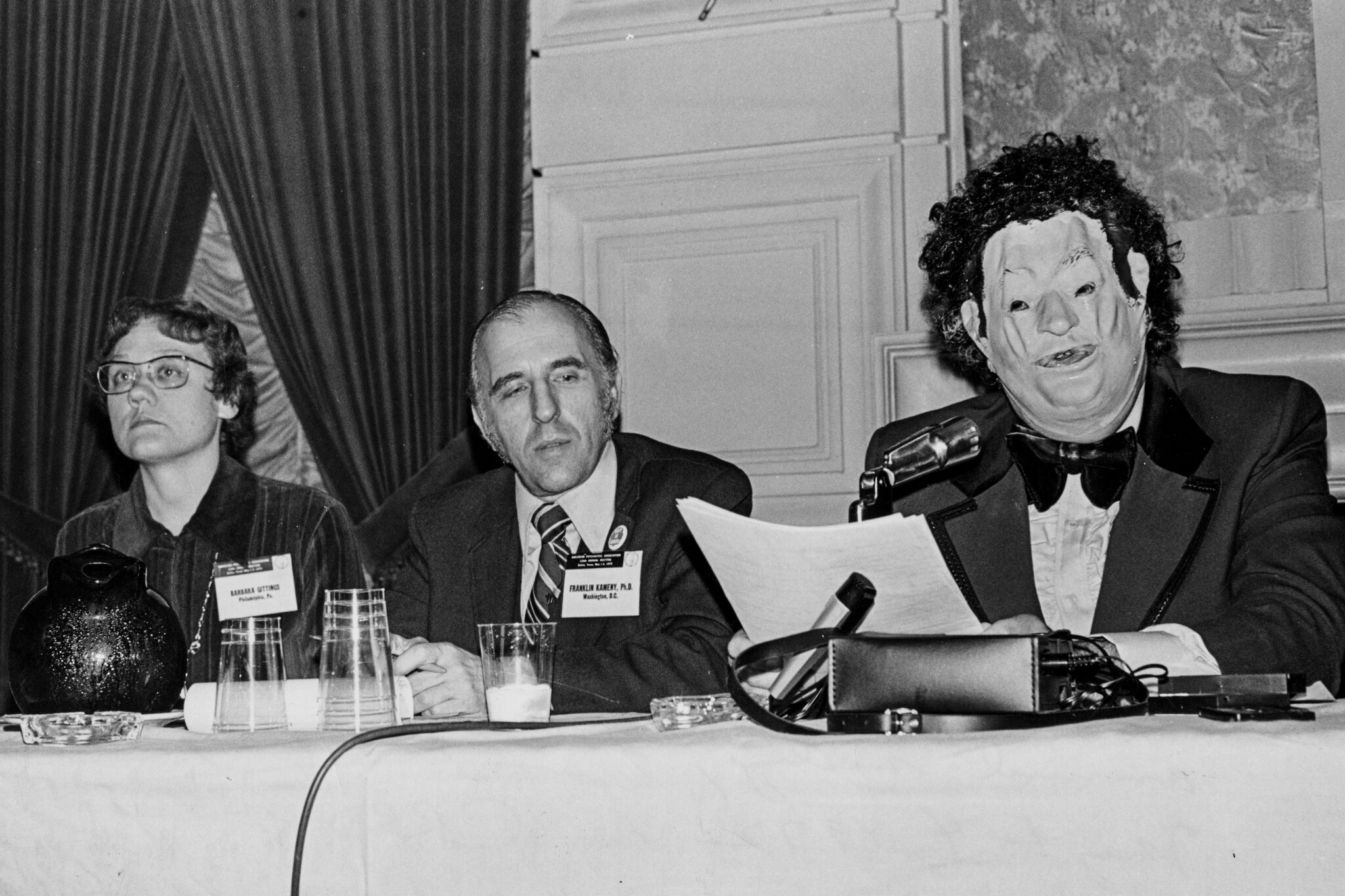
In 1972, Dr. John Fryer risked his career to tell his colleagues that gay people were not mentally ill. His act sent ripples through the legal, medical, and justice systems.

Fryer as "Dr. Henry Anonymous" in 1972 Fryer was the first gay American psychiatrist to speak publicly about his sexuality at a time when homosexuality was still listed as a mental illness, a sociopathic personality disturbance according to the second edition of the APA Diagnostic and Statistical Manual of Mental Disorders (DSM-II), that was published in 1968. In 1970, a protest at an APA event in San Francisco on aversion therapy, the message of which, according to lesbian activist Barbara Gittings, was "Stop talking about us and starting talking with us", earned gay and lesbian activists a voice in the association. The next year at the 1971 convention in Washington, Gittings organized a panel discussion on "Lifestyles of Non-patient Homosexuals", which was chaired by gay Harvard University astronomer Dr. Franklin E. Kameny, who previously had lost a job with the federal government due to his homosexuality.

In a planned protest, members of the APA Gay Liberation and the Radical Caucus seized the microphone. Kameny denounced the APA "oppression" of homosexuals by psychiatry, calling it "the enemy incarnate". This was part of Kameny's long-standing protest about the diagnosis of homosexuality, a fight that he had been waging since at least 1964. He appeared on television to declare that being gay was "not a disease, a pathology, a sickness, a malfunction, or a disorder of any sort". Kameny wrote in Psychiatric News: "[W]e object to the sickness theory of homosexuality tenaciously held with utter disregard for the disastrous consequences of this theory to the homosexual, based as it is on poor science."

This protest led to a meeting the next year, at the association's 1972 annual meeting, on homosexuality and mental illness. Entitled "Psychiatry: Friend or Foe to the Homosexual?; A Dialogue", it included Kameny and Gittings on the panel. Gittings' partner, Kay Lahusen, had noted that the panel included homosexuals who were not psychiatrists, and psychiatrists who were not homosexuals. No homosexual, however, were psychiatrists, so Gittings set out to find one who would be willing to be a panel member. After numerous contacts, she was unable to find a gay psychiatrist who would speak, so she had decided that she would read letters from gay psychiatrists without revealing their names. She then contacted Fryer and convinced him to appear. Later, Fryer said that the recent death of his father was one factor in his decision to accept the invitation, but his experiences at losing positions because of his homosexuality were the reasons that he did so, only after Gittings suggested that he could be disguised.

Listed only as "Dr. H. Anonymous" (later expanded to "Dr. Henry Anonymous"), Fryer appeared on stage wearing a rubber joke-shop face mask – that sometimes was described as a mask of Richard M. Nixon, but which probably was altered from its original state, – a wig, and a baggy tuxedo, and he spoke through a microphone that distorted his voice. (Note: Fryer was assisted in creating his disguise by his then-boyfriend, who was a drama major. Not only fear of repercussions led to the theatricality of Fryer's disguised appearance: he later chaired a meeting of the International Work Group on Death, Dying, and Bereavement in 1974 wearing loudly patterned dashikis and used a ceramic cow bell to keep order; he had a propensity for theatricality.) In 2002, Dr. Jack Drescher, then the head of the APA Committee on Gay, Lesbian, Bisexual Issues pointed out "[t]he irony ... that an openly homosexual psychiatrist had to wear a mask to protect his career. So the fact that someone would get up on stage, even in disguise, at the risk of professional denunciation or loss of job, it was not a small thing. Even in disguise, it was a very, very brave thing to do."

At the time of his speaking, Fryer was on the faculty of Temple University, but did not have the security of tenure, so he was in real danger of losing his position if he had been identified – he had already lost a residency at the University of Pennsylvania, and was later forced to leave a position on the staff of Friends Hospital because of his flamboyance. According to Fryer, he found it to be ironic that the Friends administrator who had told him, "If you were gay and not flamboyant, we would keep you. If you were flamboyant and not gay we would keep you. But since you are both gay and flamboyant, we cannot keep you" was in the front row at his 1972 appearance as Dr. Anonymous and never realized that "Anonymous" was Fryer.

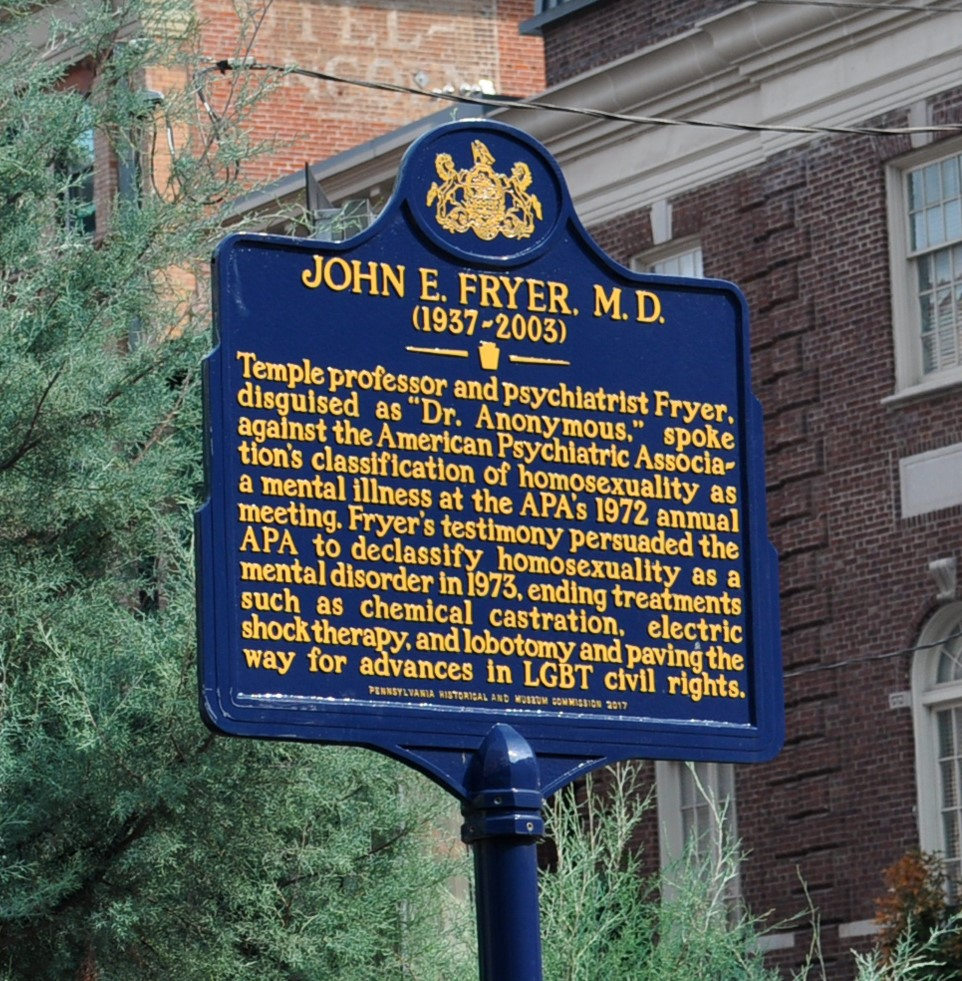
John E. Fryer, M.D. Historical Marker on Thirteenth Street at Locust Street in Philadelphia, Pennsylvania

Fryer's speech began: "I am a homosexual. I am a psychiatrist", and he went on to describe the lives of the many gay psychiatrists in the APA who had to hide their sexuality from their colleagues for fear of discrimination, as well as from fellow homosexuals owing to the disdain in which the psychiatric profession was held among the gay community. Fryer's speech suggested ways in which gay psychiatrists could subtly and "creatively" challenge prejudice in their profession without disclosing their sexuality, and how they could help gay patients adjust to a society that considered their sexual preferences a sign of psychopathology. Reportedly, there were more than 100 gay psychiatrists at the convention. (Note: There are some discrepancies between Fryer's handwritten manuscript for the speech, which is in the Fryer collection at the Historical Society of Pennsylvania, and the text as it has been published in various places. For instance, in the manuscript, Fryer writes that there are more than 200 gay psychiatrists registered for the APA convention, while the published text claims only 100. Similarly, the manuscript says "[W]e should have clearly in our minds our own particular understanding of what it is to be a healthy homosexual in a world which sees that appellation as an impossible anachronism", while the published version corrects "anachronism" to "oxymoron". It is unclear if these changes were made in the process of converting the manuscript to the typescript Fryer read from at the 1972 meeting, or whether they were the result of post-event editing of the text before it was published.)

At least one other panelist agreed with Fryer and Kameny that the stance of the psychiatric establishment toward homosexuality was wrong. The vice president of the APA at the time and later president, Dr. Judd Marmor, said: "I must concede that psychiatry is prejudiced as has been charged. Psychiatric mores reflect the predominant social mores of the culture." He later wrote: "In a democratic society we recognize the rights of such individuals to have widely divergent religious preferences, as long as they do not attempt to force their beliefs on others who do not share them. Our attitudes toward divergent sexual preferences, however, are quite different, obviously because moral values – couched in 'medical' and 'scientific' rationalizations – are involved."

Also appearing on the panel were Dr. Kent Robinson, from Shepherd Pratt Psychiatric Hospital, and Robert Seidenberg.

After the panel discussion, Fryer appeared for two hours on a local radio talk show as "Dr. Anonymous" with his voice disguised. Fryer later said it was broadcast from one of the gay bars in the area. Although some of his colleagues knew who he was, at the time of his speech and later, Fryer did not formally acknowledge having been "Dr. Anonymous" until the 1994 APA convention in Philadelphia.

Homosexuality was removed from the Diagnostic and Statistical Manual in 1973, a year after Fryer's speech (Note: However, the designation homosexuality with sexual orientation disturbance remained in the Manual until finally removed in 1987.) – leading the now-defunct Philadelphia Bulletin to print the headline "Homosexuals gain instant cure" – and Fryer's speech has been cited as a key factor in persuading the psychiatric community to reach this decision. Gittings later said of it: "His speech shook up psychiatry. He was the right person at the right time." Fryer later wrote in a 1985 newsletter of the Association of Gay and Lesbian Psychiatrists, that it was "something that had to be done" and "the central event in my career... I had been thrown out of a residency because I was gay. I lost a job because I was gay... It had to be said, but I couldn't do it as me... I was not yet full time on the [Temple] faculty. I am now tenured, and tenured by a chairman who knows I'm gay. That's how things have changed."

== Later life and death ==
Fryer became a professor at Temple, both of psychiatry, and of family and community medicine. He specialized in the treatment of drug and alcohol addiction as well as in death and bereavement. Later in his career, he began treating gay men with AIDS who were dying, seeing them in his home office rather than in his practice at Temple, for reasons of patient confidentiality. He was involved in setting up Physicians in Transition, Temple's Family Life Development Center, the APA International Work Group on Death, Dying, and Bereavement, and the Philadelphia AIDS Task Force. In 1980, at the behest of Dame Cicely Saunders, founder of London's St. Christopher's Hospice, he took a sabbatical from Temple and helped to restructure the education department of the hospice. Fryer retired from Temple in 2000.

In 2002, it was reported that Fryer had accepted a position at a hospital in the Northern Territory of Australia, but he never took up that post.

Fryer also was a musician, playing the organ. For thirty years he was the choirmaster of St. Peter's Church in the Germantown neighborhood of Philadelphia where he lived. He also played the organ for Temple University graduations.

Toward the end of his life, Fryer was being treated for diabetes and pulmonary sarcoidosis, but he eventually died from gastrointestinal bleeding and aspiration pneumonia in 2003.

== Awards and honors ==
Fryer received a "Distinguished Alumnus" award (Recognizing alumni who have made significant achievements in their careers and service to the university) from Vanderbilt University in 2002, and in that same year he was awarded a Distinguished Service Award from the Association of Gay and Lesbian Psychiatrists (AGLP), now the Association of LGBTQ Psychiatrists.

After his death, his alma mater, Transylvania University, honored Fryer with a fund that honors his legacy by working to protect the rights and well-being of students who come from marginalized groups.

After Fryer’s death in 2003, the Association of Gay and Lesbian Psychiatrists, along with the American Psychiatric Association, endowed the APA "John E. Fryer, M.D. Award" in his memory, to honor a person whose work has contributed to the mental health of sexual minorities. The award includes both giving a lecture at the fall conference of the ALGP and an honorarium. The first two recipients of the award, in 2006, were Barbara Gittings and Frank Kameny.

On October 3, 2017, a historical marker was unveiled in Philadelphia in the Gayborhood, across the street from the Historical Society. It reads:

John E. Fryer, M.D.
(1937-2003)

Temple professor and psychiatrist Fryer, disguised as "Dr. Anonymous," spoke against the American Psychiatric Association's classification of homosexuality as a mental illness at the APA's 1972 annual meeting. Fryer's testimony convinced the APA to declassify homosexuality as a mental disorder in 1973, ending treatments such as chemical castration, electric shock therapy, and lobotomy and paving the way for advances in LGBT civil rights.

Pennsylvania Historical and Museum Commission 2017

In 2022, Fryer’s house at 138 W. Walnut Lane, where he lived from 1972 until he died in 2003, was added to the Philadelphia Register of Historic Places.

Fryer's papers are archived at the Historical Society of Pennsylvania in more than 200 boxes, and are available to the public. Some documents have been digitized and are available online.

In 2025, Dr. Fryer was officially honored in his hometown of Winchester, Kentucky for the first time. On June 29, an official Kentucky historical marker was unveiled near his family home on Bon Haven Ave. in Winchester. On October 18, at the Winchester Pride + Inclusion Festival held on Depot Street, the street was ceremonial renamed "Dr. John Fryer Blvd." for the day. By proclamation of Winchester Mayor Jo Ellen Reed, October 18 was recognized as "Dr. John E. Fryer Day" in Winchester.

== In popular culture ==
In May 2016, a play by Ain Gordon, 217 Boxes of Dr. Henry Anonymous – based on Gordon's research as an "embedded artist" at the Historical Society of Pennsylvania (HSP), where Fryer's papers are archived – premiered at the Painted Bride Art Center in Philadelphia. The play explores Fryer and the circumstances around his 1972 appearance at the APA convention through monologues by three people who knew him: Alfred A. Gross, the executive director of the New York City-based George W. Henry Foundation, a social charity that helped homosexual men who had gotten into trouble with the law; Katherine M. Luder, Fryer's long-time secretary; and Fryer's father, Ercel Ray Fryer. Gordon's entire project – including video of all the public events prior to the presentation of the play, the play's script and video of a performance – will be added to the Fryer archive at HSP. In May 2018, the play was revived by the Equality Forum for two weeks of performances at the Baryshnikov Arts Center in New York City, to coincide with the American Psychiatric Association's annual meeting, and again at Transylvania University – Fryer's alma mater – in Lexington, Kentucky, in May 2019, and at the UCLA Center for the Art of Performance in October, 2019.

In June 2020, it was announced that Steven Canals would write and develop for the FX television channel 81 Words, a miniseries that would focus on the campaign to get the APA to remove homosexuality from the Diagnostic and Statistics Manual. The miniseries will be based on "81 Words", the This American Life episode by Alix Spiegel, and Cured- a documentary by Patrick Sammon and Bennett Singer that was scheduled to premiere at the virtual Los Angeles Outfest in August 2020. Cured was the first runner-up for the 2020 Library of Congress Lavine/Ken Burns Prize for Film, having been chosen from more than 150 finalists. The film was scheduled to be shown on PBS.

== See also ==
- Barbara Gittings
- Homosexuality and psychology
- Frank Kameny
