= Randy Wicker =

American author, activist and blogger (born 1938)

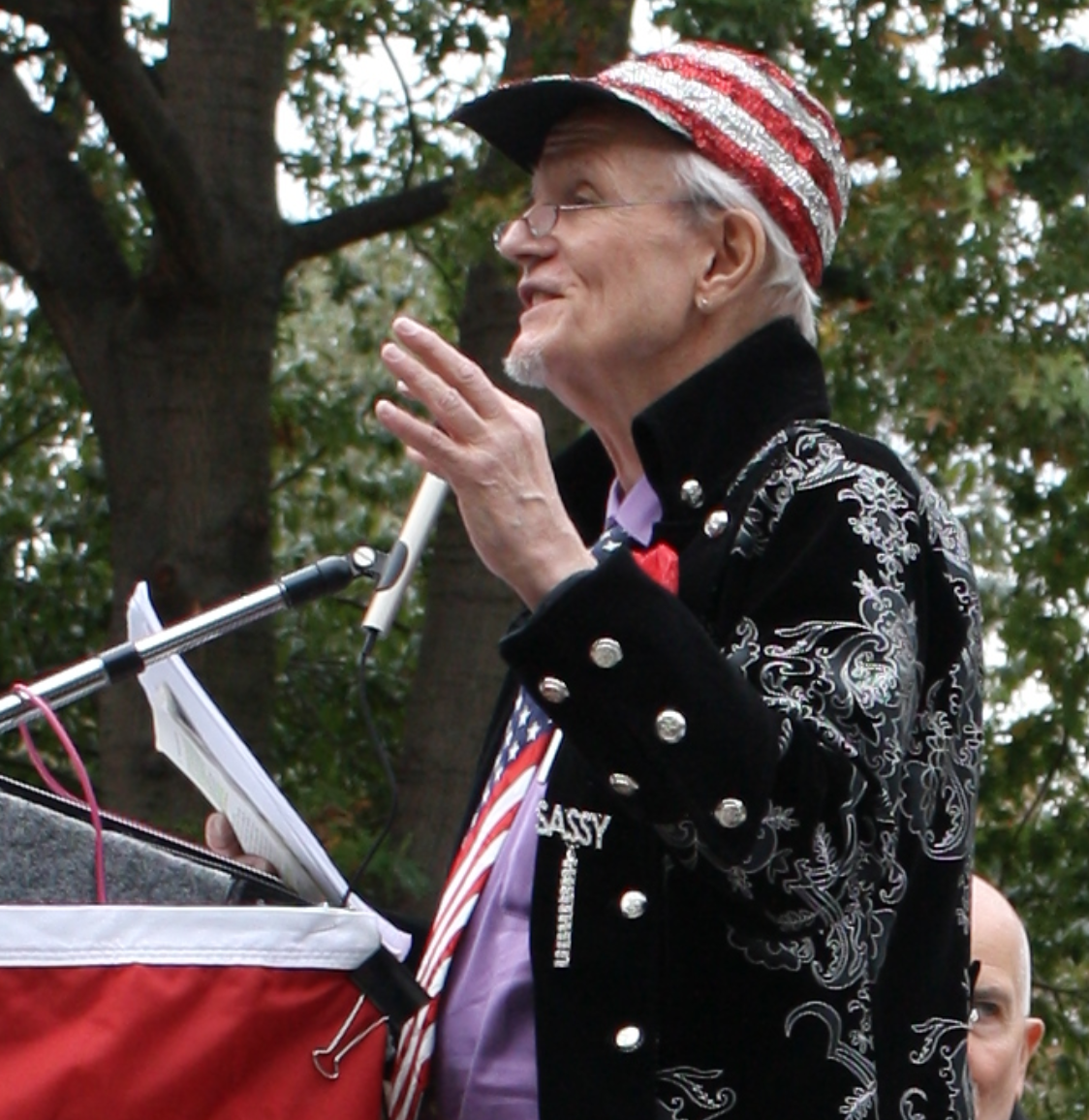
- Wicker in 2009
- Born: Charles Gervin Hayden Jr. February 3, 1938 (age 88); Plainfield, New Jersey, U.S.
- Occupations: Activist, author, blogger
- Known for: Gay activism

Randolfe Hayden "Randy" Wicker (born February 3, 1938) is an American author, activist, blogger, and archivist. Notable for his involvement in the early homophile and gay liberation movements, Wicker has documented the early years and many of the key figures of the LGBT activist communities, primarily in New York City. Since 1996, he has been active around the issue of human cloning.

== Early life ==
Wicker was born Charles Gervin Hayden Jr. on February 3, 1938, in Plainfield, New Jersey. He was raised in Florida by his grandparents.

== LGBT activism ==
=== Pre-Stonewall ===
Wicker's first exposure to the gay movement came while he was a student at the University of Texas at Austin in the mid-1950s, when he discovered a copy of the ONE, Inc. magazine One. Wicker affiliated himself with the New York City chapter of the gay Mattachine Society of New York (MSNY) in 1958, while still a student, spending the summer in the city to work with the organization. The Mattachine took a comparatively conservative stance in its work for gay rights, while Wicker, who was younger than the leadership and many of the other members, joined with other younger activists like MSNY vice president Craig Rodwell in an effort to make the group more radical. "He was, let's say, a disturbing acquisition for the movement", recalled then-MSNY president Arthur Maule.

After convincing MSNY that it should begin publicizing its events, Wicker printed up flyers for an upcoming lecture, leading to a standing-room-only crowd. It also led police to persuade MSNY's landlord to evict the group from its recently occupied headquarters.

As he became more active in the movement, Wicker informed his family about his activities. Hayden Sr., while skeptical that his efforts would amount to anything, asked him not to use "Charles Hayden" for his activism. He adopted the pseudonym "Randolfe Hayden Wicker", retaining his family name as his new middle name to maintain the family connection. He legally changed his name in 1967.

Returning to Austin in the fall of 1958, Wicker tried to start a gay organization called Wicker Research Studies. WRS adopted the philosophy of the San Francisco-based lesbian group Daughters of Bilitis and operated across Texas, Mississippi, and Louisiana. WRS was short-lived, however, as Mississippi denied the organization's application for incorporation. He also became active in the civil rights movement. Wicker ran for student body president but during the campaign the dean received notification that Wicker and his roommate Edward Lacey were gay. This helped convince him that homosexuals needed to engage in militant action.

Upon graduating from UT-Austin, Wicker relocated permanently to New York City and renewed his ties with MSNY. Stifled from radical actions under the purview of MSNY, Wicker created the "Homosexual League of New York" in 1962, a front organization that existed, largely on paper, to allow Wicker distance from MSNY to operate. When WBAI radio broadcast a panel of psychiatrists who espoused the sickness theory of homosexuality, Wicker persuaded the station manager to put him and several other openly gay people on the air to "rap" about their lives, because "homosexuals were the real authority on homosexuality." A week before the broadcast, Jack O'Brian, a columnist for the New York Journal American, attacked it as an attempt to present "the ease of living the gay life." Wicker made the rounds to Variety, Newsweek, and The New York Times informing them of the broadcast and the attack on it by O'Brian. The 90-minute program, believed to be the first such in the United States, aired in July, 1962. Several mainstream media outlets, alerted by Wicker, covered the broadcast, which received favorable treatment in The New York Times, The Realist, Newsweek, the New York Herald Tribune, and Variety. The broadcast resulted in a Federal Communications Commission rule that homosexuality was a "legitimate topic for on-air discussion."

As a result of the publicity, from 1962 through 1964, Wicker was one of the most visible gay people in New York. He spoke to countless church groups and college classes and, in 1964, became the first openly gay person to appear on East Coast television with a January 31 appearance on The Les Crane Show. Wicker is credited with organizing the first known gay rights demonstration in the United States. Wicker, along with Rodwell, sexual freedom activist Jefferson Poland and a handful of others, picketed the Whitehall Street Induction Center in New York City in 1964 after the confidentiality of gay men's draft records was violated.

In 1965, he ran for the office of secretary for MSNY as an independent. He lost, but a slate of radicals whose views aligned with his swept the elections, effectively taking control of the organization. He supported himself by operating, with his lover Peter Ogren, Underground Uplift Unlimited, a slogan-button and head shop. The couple ran the shop from 1967 to 1971, and used the proceeds to open an antique and lighting store. Wicker ran his store for 29 years.

=== Stonewall uprising and aftermath ===
Wicker was a witness to the Stonewall riots in June, 1969, which are recognized as the start of the modern gay liberation movement. He later recalled seeing rioters set bonfires and throw garbage barrels through the windows of Greenwich Village businesses. "All I could think was, Oh my God, they're going to burn up a little old Italian lady or some child is going to be killed and we're going to be the bogey-man of the seventies."

Despite his early activism, Wicker denounced the riots at a community organizational meeting a week later, saying that "throwing rocks through windows doesn't open doors" and dismissing "disorderly" behavior as a means to social tolerance. (Note: Wicker would later regret his words, calling them one of the biggest mistakes of his life (Clendenin and Nagourney, p. 27).) He temporarily distanced himself from the gay movement, but returned by writing in 1970 for Gay, a tabloid magazine, and again in 1972 to lend his name as co-author The Gay Crusaders, a compilation of profiles of early movement leaders, with Kay Lahusen (writing under the name "Kay Tobin") though Lahusen, who was uncomfortable with public speaking, wrote it all and Wicker simply agreed to do promotion of the book.

Wicker joined the Gay Activists Alliance (GAA), a more structured activist group that formed in response to what was seen as the excesses of the Gay Liberation Front (GLF). The GLF had an intersectional approach, and spread their focus amongst a number of left-oriented political activities, including opposition to the Vietnam War and support for the Black Panther Party. The GAA members wanted to concentrate their energies exclusively on gay rights issues. As a member of the GAA, Wicker participated in a series of zaps, or occupation-style actions. At times Wicker also covered these events for gay media outlets like Gay and The Advocate. Wicker was roommates with GLF Drag Queen Caucus, Street Transvestite Action Revolutionaries (STAR) co-founder, and ACT UP activist Marsha P. Johnson from 1982 until Johnson's death in 1992.

Since 2009, Wicker has been documenting and participating in the Radical Faerie communities in Tennessee and New York.

In 2023, he served as grand marshal of the NYC Pride March and launched a petition to remove the General Phil Sheridan statue from Stonewall National Monument because of "Sheridan's massacre of Indigenous people." He also donated his archives to the National LGBTQ+ Archives the same year.

== Cloning activist ==
With the announcement of the successful cloning of Dolly the sheep in 1996, Wicker became an advocate for human cloning. He formed the activist Cloning Rights United Front, and argued that the right to bear one's "later-born identical twin" was not only an LGBT rights issue, but a human rights issue. He sought unsuccessfully to convince Stephen Hawking to preserve genetic material for future cloning. As a part of its mission statement, CRUF adopted the "Clone Bill of Rights":

1. Every person's DNA is his or her personal property. To have that DNA cloned into another extended life is part and parcel of his or her right to control his or her own reproduction.
2. Constitutionally, that right is assigned to neither state legislatures, nor to the federal government, nor to religious authorities. It is "reserved" to each and every citizen, to decide if, how and when to reproduce.
3. Research, not rhetoric, and/or freedom-limiting legal restrictions, is the only way to discover the real effects of cloning. Restrictions on research into cloning of humans should not even be considered unless real social harm can be demonstrated.

== Legacy ==
Season 2, episode 1 of the podcast "Making Gay History" is about Wicker and Marsha P. Johnson, and features an interview where the two dispel misinformation about the first night of the Stonewall riots.
