= Barbara Gittings =

Librarian, LGBT rights activist (1932–2007)

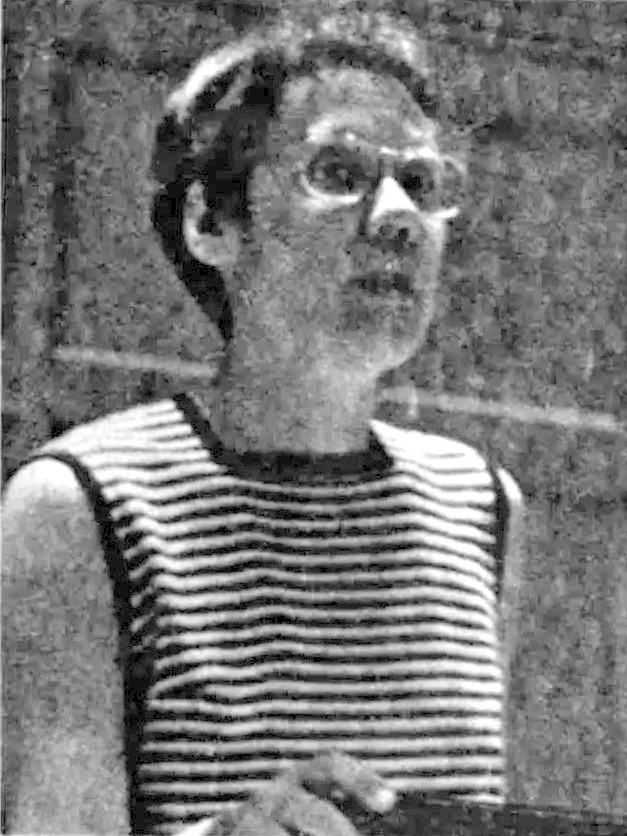
- Gittings in 1969
- Born: July 31, 1932; Vienna, Austria
- Died: February 18, 2007 (aged 74); Kennett Square, Pennsylvania, U.S.
- Resting place: Congressional Cemetery
- Education: Northwestern University
- Organization(s): Daughters of Bilitis, American Library Association
- Movement: Gay rights movement
- Partner(s): Kay Lahusen (1961-Gittings' death, 2007)
- Awards: GLAAD Barbara Gittings Award; Lifetime Honorary Membership, American Library Association

Barbara Gittings (July 31, 1932 – February 18, 2007) was an American LGBTQ activist. She started the New York chapter of the Daughters of Bilitis (DOB) in 1958, edited the national DOB magazine The Ladder from 1963 to 1966, and worked closely with Frank Kameny in the 1960s on the first picket lines that brought attention to the ban on employment of gay people in the United States government, the largest employer of the country at the time. In the 1970s, Gittings was most involved in the American Library Association, especially its Task Force on Gay Liberation, in order to promote positive literature about homosexuality in libraries. She was a part of the movement to get the American Psychiatric Association to drop homosexuality as a mental illness in the early 1970s.

She was awarded an American Library Association Honorary Membership, and the ALA named an annual award for the best LGBTQ novel the Stonewall Book Award-Barbara Gittings Literature Award. GLAAD also named an activist award for her.

== Early life and education ==
Barbara Gittings was born to Elizabeth (née Brooks) Gittings and John Sterett Gittings Jr. in Vienna, Austria, where her father was serving as a United States diplomat. Barbara Gittings and her siblings attended Catholic schools in Montreal. At one point in her childhood, she considered becoming a nun. Her family returned to the United States at the outbreak of World War II and settled in Wilmington, Delaware. Although aware of her attraction to other girls, Gittings said she first heard the word "homosexual" when she was rejected for membership in the National Honor Society in high school based on what a teacher believed were her "homosexual inclinations."

While majoring in drama at Northwestern University, Gittings developed a close friendship with another female student, prompting rumors that the two were lesbians, which led Gittings to examine her own sexual orientation, meeting a psychiatrist who offered to cure her. A close friend suggested they see less of each other so as not to further encourage the rumors about them.

She began to read as much as she could on the topic, finding very little; much of what she found described homosexuals as deviants, especially in medical texts. She ended up failing out of Northwestern.

=== After college ===
At age 17, she returned from Northwestern "in disgrace" after failing out of school and unable to tell her family why. She found some more information on lesbianism in novels like Nightwood, The Well of Loneliness, and Extraordinary Women. Soon thereafter, her father discovered The Well of Loneliness in her bedroom; in a letter, he instructed her to burn it. Gittings took a night course in abnormal psychology, where she met a woman with whom she had a brief affair. At age 18, she left home to be on her own and moved to Philadelphia.

Gittings began to hitchhike on weekends to New York City, dressed masculinely, to visit gay bars since she knew of none in Philadelphia. However, Gittings found little in common with the women she met in the bars; she also once witnessed a gay male acquaintance get beaten up after leaving a bar.

== Activism in the 1950s and 1960s ==
=== Daughters of Bilitis ===
In 1956, Gittings traveled to California on the advice of Edward Sagarin, to visit the office of the new ONE Inc., an early homophile organization. While in California, she met Phyllis Lyon and Del Martin, who had co-founded the Daughters of Bilitis (DOB) in San Francisco.

In 1958, Martin and Lyon asked Gittings to start a chapter of the DOB in New York City, which she did; fewer than a dozen women responded to her notice in the Mattachine Society newsletter asking for "all women in the New York area who are interested in forming a chapter of the DOB" on September 20, 1958. Gittings served as the chapter's first president for three years, from 1958 until 1961. While she was president attending members numbered between ten and forty per meeting. They met twice a month and often invited doctors, psychiatrists, ministers, and attorneys to address their meetings, even if their message was disparaging to lesbians.

Gittings admitted that early meetings and writings in the Daughters of Bilitis urged their members not to upset mainstream heterosexual society. The New York chapter of the DOB distributed a newsletter to about 150 people, which Gittings worked on. During this time, she spent ten years as a mimeograph operator for an architectural firm. In 1959, after using company envelopes to mail the newsletter out, someone wrote to the firm to notify them that a newsletter about lesbianism was being distributed. She was not fired but was cautioned to be more careful.

=== The Ladder ===
From 1963 to 1966, Gittings edited the DOB's magazine, The Ladder. Articles and essays in The Ladder sometimes carried viewpoints of medical professionals speaking negatively about homosexuality, since it was difficult to get psychiatrists and doctors to address homosexuality in any form. However, Gittings was profoundly influenced by Frank Kameny's advocacy against homosexuality being viewed as a sickness, and began to diverge from the DOB's policies.

Gittings began to implement changes in The Ladder that included adding the subtitle "A Lesbian Review" and featuring photographs of actual lesbians on the cover. Gittings distributed The Ladder in six bookstores in New York and Philadelphia; one Greenwich Village store displayed the magazine prominently, selling 100 copies a month. The focus of the magazine shifted to tackling more controversial issues for debate.

=== Protests ===
Gittings participated in many of the earliest LGBT actions in the United States. In 1965, Gittings marched in the first gay picket lines at the White House, the State Department, and Independence Hall to protest the federal government's policy on discrimination of homosexuals. Leaflets were distributed to passersby that described their reasons for picketing. The evening prior to the group's picketing the State Department, Secretary of State Dean Rusk announced the pickets at a press conference. Gittings connected the high-profile visibility with a "breakthrough into mainstream publicity."

From 1965 to 1969, she and Frank Kameny led the Annual Reminder, picketing at Independence Hall in Philadelphia on July 4, until the Stonewall Riots in June 1969. After the riots, the annual Gay Pride Parade commemorating the riots took its place. Differences between Gittings' political stance and that of the DOB leadership began to show, and came to a culmination in 1966 when she was ousted as the editor of The Ladder for. One source claims it was for the lateness of one issue, but another source claims it was because she removed the "For Adults Only" on the cover of the magazine without consulting the DOB.

In November 1967, Gittings and Kameny worked together as co-counsels in hearings held by the Department of Defense to discredit expert witness Charles Socarides, who testified that homosexuals could be converted to heterosexuality, and to criticize the DoD's policy that known homosexual employees could be fired. Kameny and Gittings dressed conservatively, but wore buttons that said "Gay is Good" and "Pray for Sodomy", with increased publicity being their goal. Although neither was an attorney, at the end of their cross-examination, the Department of Defense removed Socarides from their lists of expert witnesses.

Gittings made hundreds of appearances as a speaker in the late 1960s, continuing her mission to convince the public that homosexuality was not an illness.

== Activism in the 1970s and later ==
=== American Library Association ===
In the 1970s, Gittings continued her search for resources in libraries that addressed homosexuality in a positive, supportive way. She joined the Task Force on Gay Liberation that formed in 1970 in the American Library Association, the first gay caucus in a professional association, and became its coordinator in 1971. She staffed a kissing booth at the national convention of the ALA in Dallas in 1971, underneath the banner "Hug a Homosexual," with a "women only" side and a "men only" side. When no one came to the booth, she and Alma Routsong kissed in front of rolling television cameras. Gittings described it as a success, despite most of the reaction being negative, due to the increased visibility on television news.

Gittings spent years working with libraries and campaigning to get positive gay and lesbian-themed materials into libraries and to eliminate censorship and employment discrimination. She wrote "Gays in Library Land: The Gay and Lesbian Task Force of the American Library Association: The First Sixteen Years", a brief history of the Rainbow Round Table.

=== American Psychiatric Association ===
In 1972, Gittings and Kameny organized a discussion with the American Psychiatric Association entitled "Psychiatry: Friend or Foe to Homosexuals: A Dialogue", where a panel of psychiatrists were to discuss homosexuality. When Gittings' partner Kay Tobin Lahusen noticed that all the psychiatrists were heterosexual, she protested. A gay psychiatrist in Philadelphia agreed to appear on the panel in heavy disguise and with a voice-distorting microphone, calling himself "Dr. H. Anonymous". This was John E. Fryer, and he discussed how he was forced to be closeted while practicing psychiatry. Gittings read aloud letters from psychiatrists she had solicited who declined to appear for fear of professional ostracism. In 1973, homosexuality was removed from the Diagnostic and Statistical Manual of Mental Disorders. She held exhibits at American Psychiatric Association conventions in 1972, 1976, and 1978; her last one was called "Gay Love: Good Medicine".

=== Other ===
Gittings made an appearance on The Phil Donahue Show in 1970 and on The David Susskind Show in 1971, alongside other lesbians, including Lilli Vincenz and Barbara Love. They were among the first open lesbians to appear on television in the US, and debated long-held stereotypes about gay people.

In 1977, she gave a presentation at the University of Manitoba called "Gay Liberation Is for Children Too", about the importance of development of non-sexist and non-homophobic children's literature. The event was sponsored by the University of Manitoba's Students' Union and Gays for Equality.

She helped start the National LGBTQ Task Force, then called the National Gay Task Force. She also inspired nurses to form the Gay Nurses Alliance in 1973.

== Legacy ==
Gittings was sometimes described as the "Rosa Parks" of the gay and lesbian civil rights movement.

Gittings appears in the documentary films Gay Pioneers, Before Stonewall, After Stonewall, Out of the Past, and Pride Divide.

Gittings and her partner Kay Tobin Lahusen donated copies of some materials and photographs covering their activism to the Cornell University Library's Rare and Manuscript Collections.

Portion of “Pride and Progress” mural by Ann Northrup that depicts a poster which itself depicts part of the Annual Reminder picket held in 1966. In the poster, Gittings is the woman in the light gray dress behind the part of the banner that says JULY; her sign says SUPPORT HOMOSEXUAL CIVIL RIGHTS.

The Philadelphia "Pride and Progress" mural by Ann Northrup, located at William Way LGBT Community Center, features an image of Gittings.

Two episodes of the podcast Making Gay History are about her and Lahusen.

In 1999, Gittings was honored for her contributions to the LGBT movement at the seventh annual PrideFest America, in Philadelphia.

In 2001, GLAAD honored Gittings with the first Barbara Gittings Award, highlighting dedication to activism.

Also in 2001, the Free Library of Philadelphia announced its Barbara Gittings Collection of books dedicated to gay and lesbian issues. There are approximately 1500 items in the collection, making it the second largest gay and lesbian collection of books in the US, after the San Francisco Public Library.

In 2002, the Gay, Lesbian, Bisexual, and Transgender Round Table of the American Library Association renamed one of their three book awards the Stonewall Book Award-Barbara Gittings Literature Award.

In 2003, the American Library Association rewarded her with lifetime honorary membership.

In 2004, Gittings received the Michele Karlsberg Leadership Award from the Publishing Triangle.

In 2006, Gittings and Frank Kameny received the first John E. Fryer, M.D. Award from the American Psychiatric Association.

In October 2006, the Smithsonian Institution acquired a sign she carried in her picketing in 1965, donated by Frank Kameny.

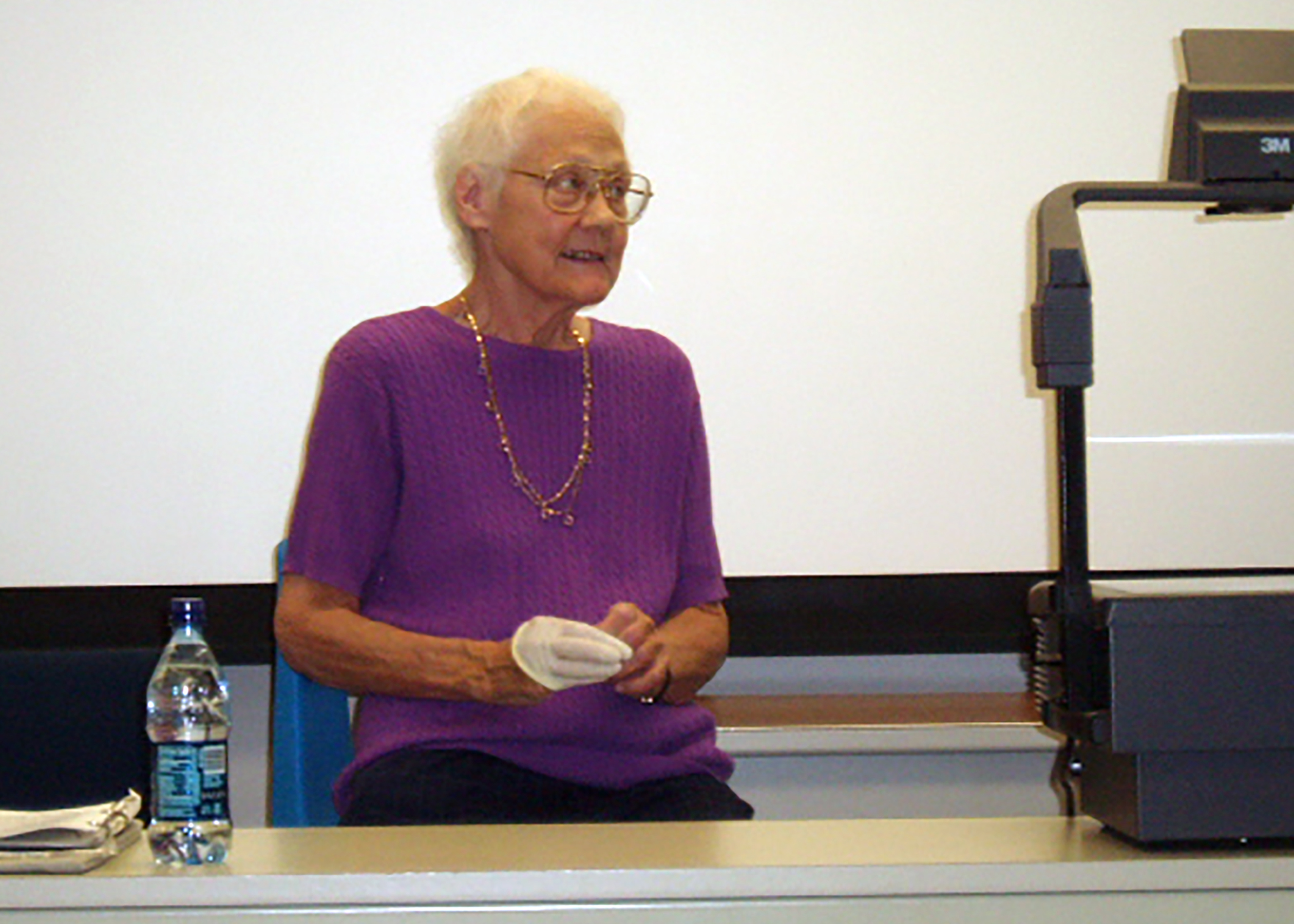
Barbara Gittings at UCLA on November 17, 2006.

In 2007, readers of The Advocate included Gittings on a list of their 40 favorite gay and lesbian heroes.

In 2007, Lahusen donated their original papers and photographs to the New York Public Library.

The University of Massachusetts Amherst Department of Special Collections and University Archives received a donation of over 1,000 of Gittings' and Lahusen's books in 2007, named the Gittings-Lahusen Gay Book Collection.

On October 1, 2012, the city of Philadelphia named a section of Locust Street "Barbara Gittings Way" in Gittings' memory.

Also in 2012, she was inducted into the Legacy Walk, an outdoor public display which celebrates LGBTQ history and people.

Designations

Pennsylvania Historical Marker
- Official name: Barbara Gittings (1932-2007)
- Type: City
- Criteria: Civil Rights, Education, Science & Medicine, Publishing & Journalism
- Designated: July 26, 2016
- Location: 21st and Locust Sts., Philadelphia
- Marker Text: Known as the mother of the LGBT civil rights movement, Gittings, who lived here, edited The Ladder, the first wide-spread lesbian journal. She led initiatives to promote LGBT literature in libraries and to remove homosexuality's classification as a mental illness.

In 2016, a historical marker in remembrance of her was erected in Philadelphia, at the intersection of South 21st Street and Locust Street, by the Pennsylvania Historical and Museum Commission.

In June 2019, Gittings was one of the inaugural fifty American "pioneers, trailblazers, and heroes" inducted on the National LGBTQ Wall of Honor within the Stonewall National Monument.

Also in 2019, Time created 89 new covers to celebrate women of the year starting from 1920; it chose Gittings for 1964.

== Personal life ==
Gittings sang in choral groups for most of her life, spending over 50 years in the Philadelphia Chamber Chorus. She and her life partner, Katherine Lahusen aka Kay Tobin, met in 1961 at a picnic in Rhode Island. Gittings and Lahusen were together for 46 years.

In 1997, Gittings and Lahusen pushed the AARP to grant couple's membership to them, for a reduced price on health insurance. One of their last acts as activists was to come out in the newsletter published by the assisted living facility they resided in.

=== Death ===
On February 18, 2007, Gittings died in Kennett Square, Pennsylvania after a long battle with breast cancer. She was survived by her life partner, Kay Tobin Lahusen, and her sister, Eleanor Gittings Taylor.

== General references ==
- Baim, Tracy. (2015) Barbara Gittings: Gay Pioneer. CreateSpace; ISBN 978-1512019742
- Bullough, Vern, ed. (2002) Before Stonewall: Activists for gay and lesbian rights in historical context. Harrington Park Press; ISBN 1-56023-192-0
- Gallo, Marcia. (2006) Different Daughters: A History of the Daughters of Bilitis and the Rise of the Lesbian Rights Movement. Carrol & Graf Publishers; ISBN 978-1580052528
- Katz, Jonathan. (1976) Gay American History: Lesbians and Gay Men in the U.S.A. Crowell; ISBN 0-06-091211-1
- Marcus, Eric. (2002) Making Gay History: The half-century fight for lesbian and gay equal rights. Perennial Press; ISBN 0-06-093391-7
- Tobin, Kay and Wicker, Randy. (1975) The Gay Crusaders. Arno Press; ISBN 0-405-07374-7
