= Frank Kameny =

American gay rights activist (1925–2011)

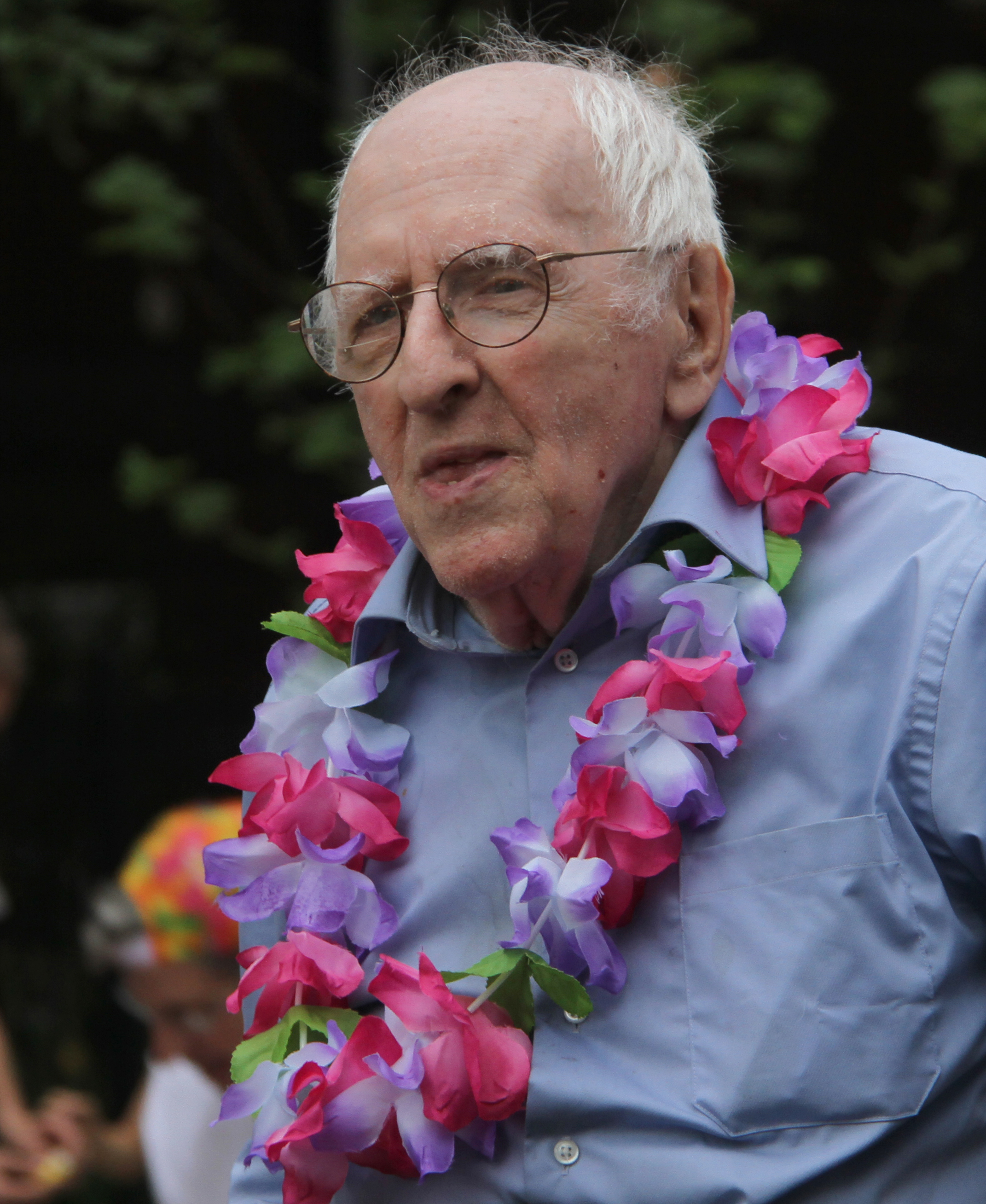
- Kameny in 2010
- Born: Franklin Edward Kameny; May 21, 1925; New York City, U.S.
- Died: October 11, 2011 (aged 86); Washington, D.C., U.S.
- Education: Queens College (BS); Harvard University (MS, PhD)
- Known for: Gay rights activist Fired for being gay by the U.S. Civil Service Commission; Co-founder of the Mattachine Society
- Scientific career
- Fields: Astronomy
- Thesis: A Photoelectric Study of Some RV Tauri and Yellow Semiregular Variables (1956)
- Doctoral advisor: Cecilia Payne-Gaposchkin

Franklin Edward Kameny (May 21, 1925 – October 11, 2011) was an American gay rights activist. He has been referred to as "one of the most significant figures" in the American gay rights movement.

During the Lavender scare, in 1957, Kameny was dismissed from his position as an astronomer in the U.S. Army's Army Map Service in Washington, D.C., because of his homosexuality, leading him to begin "a Herculean struggle with the American establishment" that would "spearhead a new period of militancy in the homosexual rights movement of the early 1960s".

Kameny formally appealed his firing by the U.S. Civil Service Commission. Although unsuccessful, the proceeding was notable as the first known civil rights claim based on sexual orientation pursued in a U.S. court.

== Life and career ==
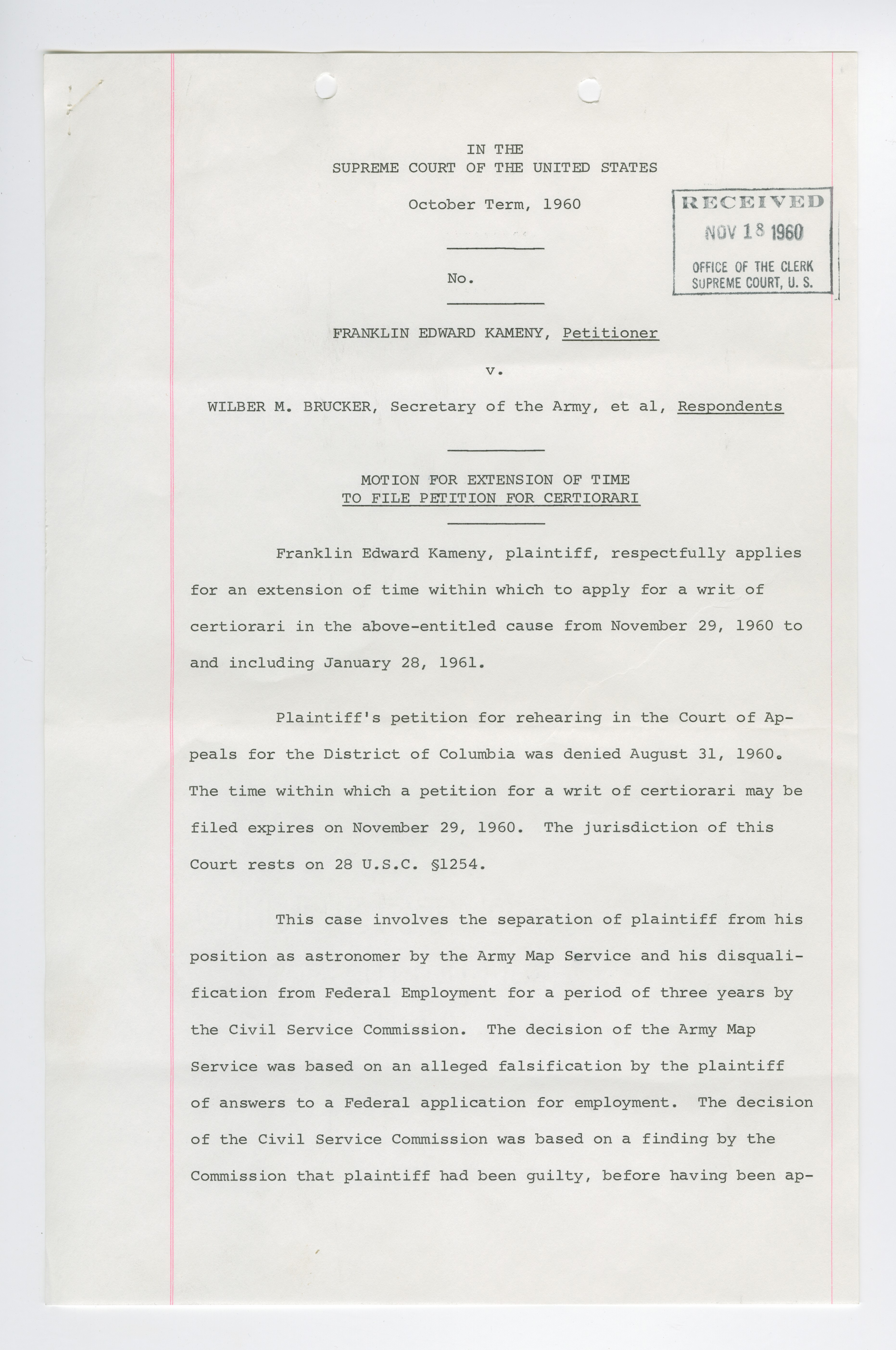
Page from Petition for Writ of Certiorari – Number 676 – Kameny v. Brucker, National Archives

=== Early life ===
Kameny was born to Ashkenazi Jewish parents in New York City on May 21, 1925. His father, Emil Kameny, was a Polish electrical engineer, and his mother, Rae Beck Kameny, was of Austro-Hungarian descent and worked as a high-ranking secretary. Franklin and his younger sister Edna spent their childhood in Richmond Hill, a neighborhood in southeastern Queens. From the age of four, he knew that he wanted to become a scientist, and by six, he narrowed down his interest to astronomy. When he was 12, he started attending Richmond Hill High School and graduated in 1941 at the age of 16. From there, Kameny went to Queens College, City University of New York, to learn physics, and at age 17 he told his parents that he was an atheist.

=== World War II ===
When Kameny first entered college at 16, the draft age for World War II was 21. In November 1942, when Kameny was a sophomore in college, Congress lowered the draft age to 18 in response to the attack on Pearl Harbor the previous December. Seventeen at this time, Kameny would be subject to the draft in six months. However, in December 1942, the military created the Army Specialized Training Program (ASTP), a program that would train young men in technical fields such as science, engineering, medicine, and linguistics. Moreover, it would keep these men in classrooms rather than sending them to battlefields. To join this program, Kameny enlisted in the United States Army on May 18, 1943, completed basic training, and then was sent to University of Illinois at Urbana-Champaign to study mechanical engineering. However, in February 1944, General George Marshall recommended withdrawing all but 30,000 participants from the ASTP to prepare for the impending invasion of France. Consequently, Kameny was sent to the frontlines where he served as an infantry private. He served in the Army throughout World War II in Europe, and later served 20 years on the Selective Service board.

=== Ph.D. program ===
After leaving the Army, he returned to Queens College and graduated with a baccalaureate in physics in 1948. Kameny then enrolled at Harvard University; while a teaching fellow at Harvard, he refused to sign a loyalty oath without attaching qualifiers, and exhibited a skepticism against accepted orthodoxies. He graduated with a master's degree (1949) and doctorate (1956) in astronomy. His doctoral thesis was titled A Photoelectric Study of Some RV Tauri and Yellow Semiregular Variables and was written under the supervision of professor Cecilia Payne-Gaposchkin.

=== Arrest ===
On August 26, 1956, Kameny was away from his home in Boston, attending a meeting for the American Astronomical Society in San Francisco. Following the conclusion of the meeting, Kameny was seen at a Key Terminal, a location labeled a hotspot for homosexual encounters. Staking out bathrooms marked for sexual encounters was common practice for vice squads. Two police officers were waiting behind a ventilation grille in the terminal men's bathroom, and witnessed Kameny and another man engaging in a sexual encounter. Kameny was detained and accused of "lewd and indecent acts." The San Francisco municipal court offered Kameny the option to plead guilty and accept a $55 fine and 6-months probation, to which Kameny obliged.

=== Washington, D.C. career and firing ===
Relocating to Washington, D.C., Kameny taught for a year in the Astronomy Department of Georgetown University and was hired in July 1957 by the U.S. Army Map Service. When they learned of his San Francisco arrest, Kameny's superiors questioned him, but he refused to provide information regarding his sexual orientation. Kameny was fired by the commission soon afterward. In January 1958, he was barred from future employment by the federal government. Author Douglass Shand-Tucci later wrote,

Kameny was the most conventional of men, focused utterly on his work, at Harvard and at Georgetown... He was thus all the more rudely shocked when the same fate befell him as we've seen befall Prescott Townsend, class of 1918, decades before... He was arrested. Later he would be fired. And, like Townsend, Kameny was radicalized.

Kameny appealed against his firing through the courts, losing twice before seeking review from the U.S. Supreme Court, which declined to consider the case, turning down his petition for certiorari. After devoting himself to activism, Kameny never held a paid job again and was supported by friends and family for the rest of his life. Despite his outspoken activism, he rarely discussed his personal life and never had any long-term relationships with other men, stating merely that he had no time for them. He stated, "If I disagree with someone, I give them a chance to convince me they are right. And if they fail, then I am right and they are wrong and I will just have to fight them until they change."

Kameny's pushback against the U.S. Government's policy on homosexual employees was the first of its kind from a gay man. He argued through written letters and eventually through the courts that the government's discrimination on the basis of sexuality is no different from discrimination based on race or religion.

Kameny eschewed conventional racial designations; throughout his life, he consistently cited his race as "human".

The Baltimore Vice Squad conducted a night raid on a homosexual bath house on March 14, 1969. They encountered Frank Kameny along with twenty-seven other men engaging in "homosexual activity," and arrested them, cited for participating in a "disorderly house." Kameny hired an attorney recommended by the ACLU and would serve no time for the arrest.

== Gay rights activism ==
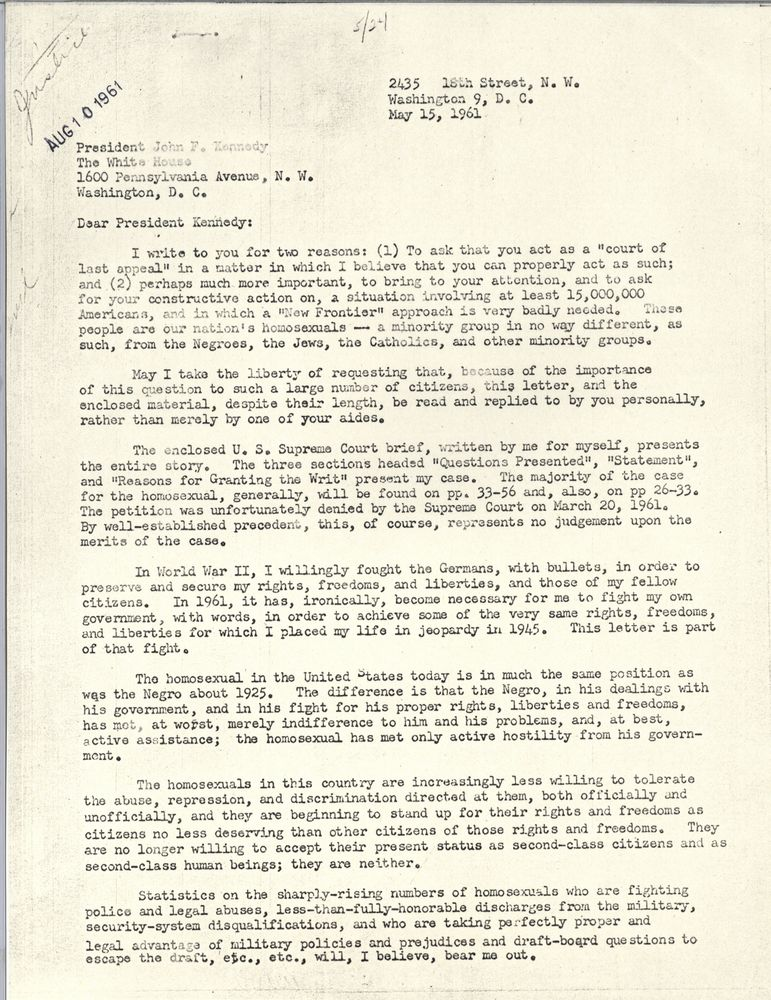
Letter from Kameny to President Kennedy, JFK Library

=== 1960–1970 ===
In late 1961, Frank Kameny co-founded the Washington D.C. branch of the national gay rights organization, Mattachine Society. In the year following the group's founding, Kameny led an initiative to declare the existence of the Mattachine Society of Washington publicly. The group sent letters to every government branch, including the entirety of Congress. Kameny also wrote to President Kennedy asking him to change the rules on homosexuals being purged from the government. The content of the letters included harsh criticism of the government's treatment of homosexuals and asserted that there were over three hundred members of the group. The letter was signed by the president of the Mattachine Society of Washington, Franklin E. Kameny.

The Mattachine Society of Washington discussed the prospect of public protest in 1963. The FBI and J. Edgar Hoover had made advancements to ban the Washington branch and had been threatened with the prospect of a march on behalf of the organization. Although supportive of the idea, Kameny refrained from taking part in a march due to the threat of damaging his public image.

In 1963, Kameny and Mattachine launched a campaign to overturn D.C. sodomy laws; he personally drafted a bill that finally passed in 1993. He also worked to remove the classification of homosexuality as a mental disorder from the American Psychiatric Association's Diagnostic and Statistical Manual of Mental Disorders.

In 1964, Kameny argued that homosexuals faced more severe discrimination than blacks because the federal government did not help them and actively discriminated against them. He suggested that homosexuals would fare worse from the success of the civil rights movement: "Now that it is becoming unfashionable to discriminate against Negroes, discrimination against homosexuals will be on the increase... Homosexuality represents the last major area where prejudice and discrimination are prevalent in this country."

In 1965, after his tenure as MSW president came to a close, Kameny organized the first demonstration by a homophile organization. The 10-person protest took place outside the white house. Signs included the organization's demands: "WE WANT FEDERAL EMPLOYMENT, HONORABLE DISCHARGES, SECURITY CLEARANCES." Kameny had strict standards for those participating in his organizations. His requirements for picketers included men wearing suits and women wearing dresses, each sign measuring twenty-two by twenty-eight inches, and the message on the sign being the same on both sides. These efforts contributed to portraying a nonviolent and respectful protest.

In coalition with New York's Mattachine Society and the Daughters of Bilitis, the picketing expanded to target the United Nations, the Pentagon, the United States Civil Service Commission, and Independence Hall in Philadelphia, for what became known as the Annual Reminder for gay rights.

Frank Kameny also contributed to homosexual activism by serving as an amateur attorney, defending government employees who had their security clearances revoked or suspended, due to allegations of "perversion" or "immoral acts." Kameny's activism in the legal system consisted of attacking the discriminatory hiring practices of the U.S. Government through court hearings. He made court hearings public and put on a spectacle to draw attention to his cases. He served as a plaintiff in his first case in 1967 alongside Barbara Gittings in defense of Donald Crawford's Department of Defense Hearing. Kameny and Gittings would serve as plaintiffs in another case later that year.

Unlike other homosexual activists at the time, Kameny rejected the idea that homosexuality was inferior to heterosexuality:

I do not see the NAACP and CORE worrying about which chromosome and gene produced a black skin, or about the possibility of bleaching the Negro. I do not see any great interest on the part of the B'nai B'rith Anti-Defamation League on the possibility of solving problems of anti-semitism by converting Jews to Christians . . . We are interested in obtaining rights for our respective minorities AS Negroes, AS Jews, and AS HOMOSEXUALS. Why we are Negroes, Jews, or Homosexuals is totally irrelevant, and whether we can be changed to Whites, Christians, or heterosexuals is equally irrelevant.

Kameny further argued that homosexuality can be a social good: "I take the stand that not only is homosexuality, whether by inclination or overt act, not immoral, but that homosexual acts engaged in by consenting adults are moral, in a positive and real sense, and are right, good and desirable, both for the individual participants and for the society in which they live." Eventually, he coined the slogan "Gay is Good" after listening to Stokely Carmichael chant "black is beautiful" in 1968.

In the 1968 election, three years after the end of his first term, Kameny was elected as president of the Mattachine Society of Washington.

=== 1970–2000 ===
In 1971, Kameny became the first openly gay candidate for the United States Congress when he ran in the District of Columbia's first election for a non-voting Congressional delegate. Following his defeat by Democrat Walter E. Fauntroy, Kameny and his campaign organization created the Gay and Lesbian Alliance of Washington, D.C., an organization which continues to lobby government and press the case for equal rights.

In 1972, Kameny and Barbara Gittings convinced the American Psychiatric Association (APA) to hold a debate, "Psychiatry: Friend or Foe to the Homosexual?; A Dialogue" at their annual meeting in Dallas. It was for this debate that Dr. John E. Fryer, a gay psychiatrist in disguise as "Dr. Henry Anonymous", testified as to how homosexuality being listed as a mental disease in the APA's Diagnostic and Statistical Manual of Mental Disorders (DSM) affected the lives of gay psychiatrists and other homosexuals. Kameny had approached numerous gay psychiatrists, but Fryer was the only one who agreed to testify, and even he would only do so in disguise for fear of losing his position at Temple University, where he did not have tenure. The following year, the APA removed homosexuality from the DSM. Kameny described that day – December 15, 1973 – as the day "we were cured en masse by the psychiatrists".

Conduct Unbecoming: Gays and Lesbians in the US Military author Randy Shilts documented Kameny's work in advising several service members in their attempts to receive honorable discharges after being discovered to be gay. For 18-year-old Marine Jeffrey Dunbar:

Kameny lined up gay ex-Marines to testify at the young man's hearing. The Washington Post ran an editorial supporting an upgraded discharge, noting that Dunbar "was involved in no scandal and had brought no shame on the Marine Corps", and called the undesirable discharge a "strange and, we think, pointless way of pursuing military 'justice'."

In 1975, his search for a gay service member with an impeccable record to initiate a challenge to the military's ban on homosexuals culminated in protégé Leonard Matlovich, a Technical Sergeant in the United States Air Force with 11 years of unblemished service and a Purple Heart and Bronze Star, purposely outing himself to his commanding officer on March 6, 1975. Matlovich had first read about Kameny's goal in an interview in the Air Force Times. Talking first by telephone, they eventually met and, along with ACLU attorney David Addlestone, planned the legal challenge. Their relationship was strained after Matlovich's interview with the New York Times Magazine, as Kameny felt that Matlovich had portrayed the gay community negatively by saying that he would have preferred to be straight.

Discharged in October 1975, Matlovich was ordered reinstated by a federal district court in 1980 in a ruling that, technically, would only have applied to him. Convinced the Air Force would create another excuse to discharge him again, Matlovich accepted a financial settlement instead, and continued his gay activism work until his death from AIDS complications in June 1988. Kameny was an honorary pallbearer at his funeral and spoke at graveside services in Washington, D.C.'s Congressional Cemetery.

On March 26, 1977, Kameny and a dozen other members of the gay and lesbian community, under the leadership of the then-National Gay Task Force, briefed then-Public Liaison Midge Costanza on much-needed changes in federal laws and policies. This was the first time that gay rights were officially discussed at the White House.

Kameny was appointed as the first openly gay member of the District of Columbia's Human Rights Commission in the 1970s.

In 1980, Kameny helped NSA linguist Jamie Shoemaker become the first openly gay government employee after Shoemaker's superiors discovered his sexuality and attempted to persuade him to resign.

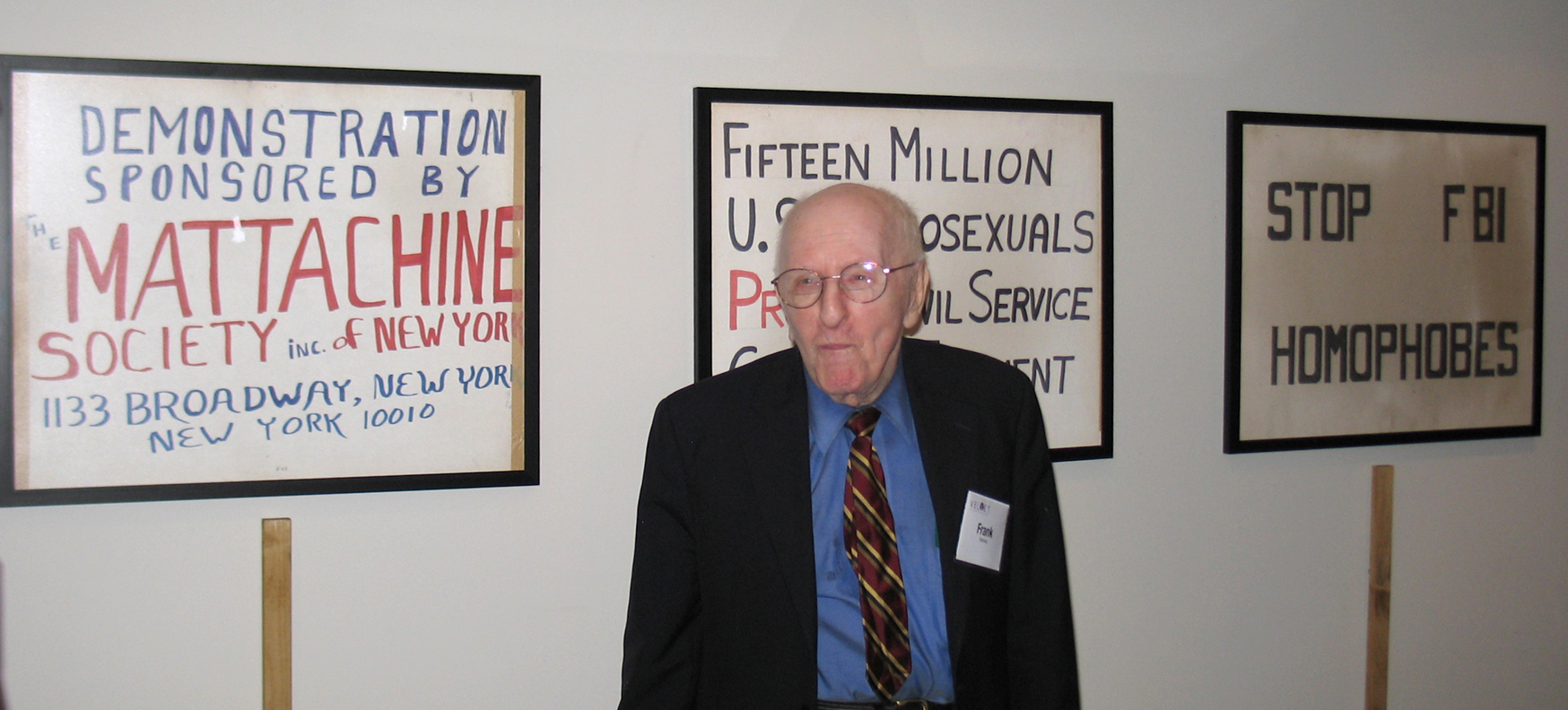
Kameny in front of signs used during protests. June 2009.

=== 2000–2011 ===
In 2007, Kameny's death was mistakenly reported by The Advocate in its May 22 "Pride issue", alongside a mistaken report that he had HIV. The report was retracted with an apology, and Kameny asked The Advocate, "Did you give a date of death?"

In 2007, Kameny wrote a letter to the conservative, anti-gay publication WorldNetDaily in defense of Idaho Republican senator Larry Craig regarding Craig's arrest for solicitation of sex in a Minneapolis airport bathroom; he ended it with the following: "I am no admirer of Larry Craig and hold out no brief for him. He is a self-deluding hypocritical homophobic bigot. But fair is fair. He committed no crime in Minneapolis and should not suffer as if he did." The New York Times' Frank Rich joined Kameny in calling for Craig's pardon.

In November 2007, Kameny wrote an open letter of protest to NBC journalist Tom Brokaw (and his publisher Random House), who wrote Boom!: Voices of the Sixties Personal Reflections on the '60s and Today, over the total lack of mention of gay and lesbian rights activism during the 1960s and upbraiding Brokaw for having "'de-gayed' an entire generation". The letter was co-signed by former Washington Post editor Howard Kurtz, Harry Rubinstein (curator, National Museum of American History), John Earl Haynes, Dudley Clendinen and Stephen Bottum. Brokaw appeared on Kurtz's CNN show Reliable Sources to defend the exclusion, saying that "the gay rights movement came slightly later. It lifted off during that time and I had to make some choices about what I was going to concentrate on. The big issues were the anti-war movement, the counterculture."

=== Death ===
Kameny suffered from heart disease in his last years, but maintained a full schedule of public appearances, his last being a speech to an LGBT group in Washington, D.C., on September 30, 2011.

Kameny was found dead in his Washington home on October 11, 2011 (National Coming Out Day). The medical examiner determined the cause of death to be natural causes due to arteriosclerotic cardiovascular disease.

== DC statehood activism ==
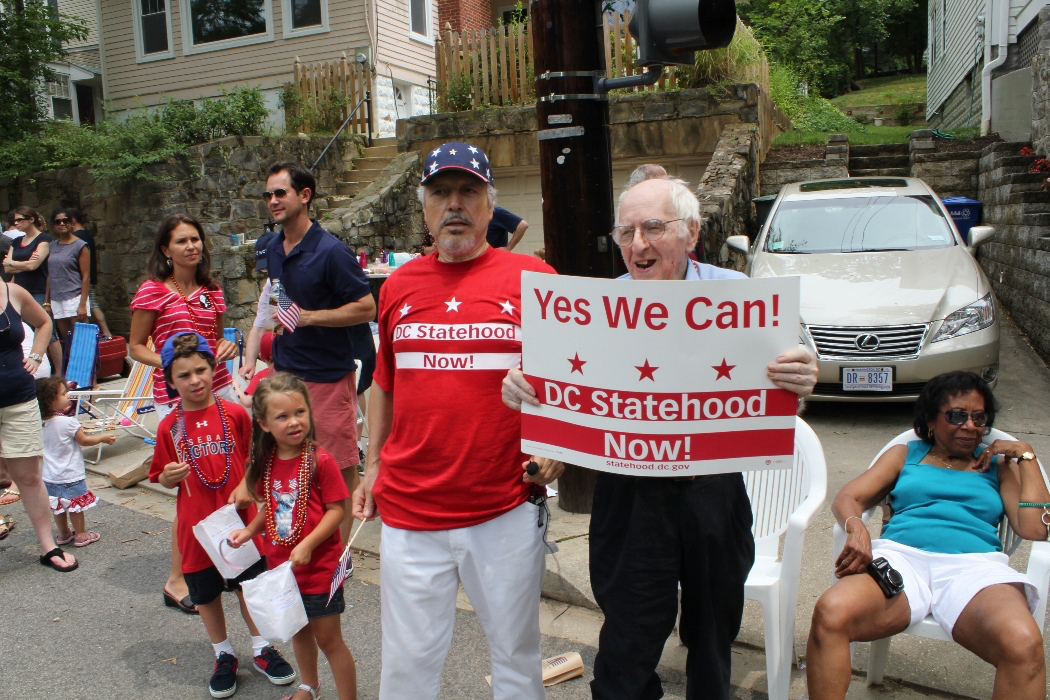
DC Statehood advocates Hector Rodriguez and Frank Kameny at the Palisades neighborhoods' annual July 4 parade, 2011. Photo by Ann Loikow.

In 1981, Kameny became an elected delegate to the District of Columbia Statehood Constitutional Convention, which was an initiative towards DC statehood. He remained an advocate for DC statehood through the end of his life. A resident of the Palisades, he was a fixture at the neighborhood's annual July 4 parade.

== Awards and honors ==
In 2006, Kameny and Barbara Gittings received the first John E. Fryer, MD Award from the American Psychiatric Association.

In 2007, the Smithsonian Institution's National Museum of American History included Kameny's picket signs carried in front of the White House in 1965 in the Smithsonian exhibit "Treasures of American History". The Smithsonian now has 12 of the original picket signs carried by gay and lesbian Americans at the first demonstration for gay rights held in front of the White House. The Library of Congress acquired Kameny's papers in 2006, documenting his life and leadership.

In February 2009, Kameny's home in Washington was designated as a Washington, D.C., historic landmark by the District of Columbia's Historic Preservation Review Board.

On June 29, 2009, John Berry (Director of the Office of Personnel Management) formally apologized to Kameny on behalf of the United States government. Berry, who is openly gay, presented Kameny with the Theodore Roosevelt Award, the OPM's most prestigious award.

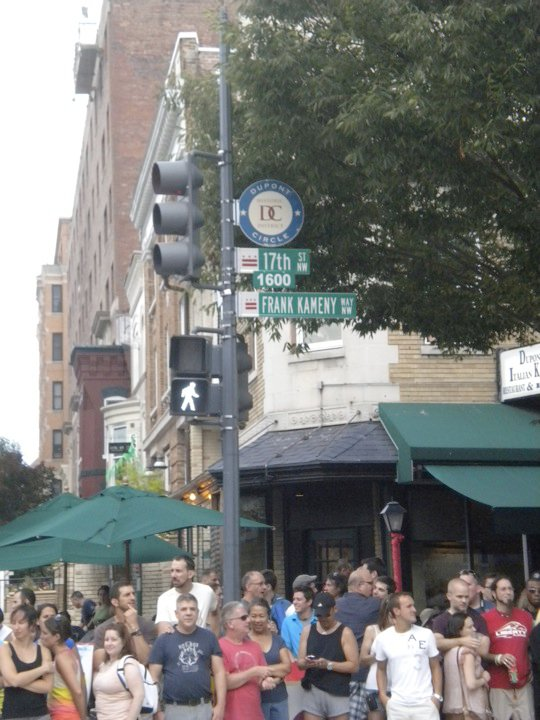
Frank Kameny Way in Washington, D.C.

On June 10, 2010, following a unanimous vote by the Dupont Circle Advisory Neighborhood Commission, Washington, D.C. mayor Adrian Fenty unveiled new street signs designating 17th Street between P and R streets, N.W., as "Frank Kameny Way" in Kameny's honor.

At a luncheon on December 10, 2010, in the Caucus room of the Cannon House Office Building, Kameny was honored with the 2010 Cornelius R. "Neil" Alexander Humanitarian Award.

Kameny was invited to attend the December 22, 2010, ceremony where President Barack Obama signed the Don't Ask, Don't Tell Repeal Act of 2010. Kameny was a member of Triangle Foundation's Board of Advisors.

Following Kameny's death, the giant rainbow flag on the flagpole at the corner of Market Street and Castro Street in the Castro neighborhood of San Francisco was flown at half-staff for 24 hours beginning on the afternoon of October 12, 2011, at the request of the creator of the rainbow flag, Gilbert Baker.

On November 2, 2011, Kameny's house was listed on the National Register of Historic Places.

In January 2012, during its national meeting, the American Astronomical Society held a public ceremony to present a posthumous certificate of appreciation to Kameny, recognizing "his exemplary lifelong commitment to promoting equal rights for homosexual men and women" and how his "activism removed discriminatory barriers that had cut short many careers." The recognition had been planned several months before his death, but Kameny passed before the meeting took place. The award was accepted on behalf of Kameny by his close personal friend Mr. Charles Francis, cofounder of the Kameny Papers Project, and three LGBTQ astronomers at various career stages.

On July 3, 2012, asteroid (40463) Frankkameny was named in Kameny's honor by the International Astronomical Union and the Minor Planet Center.

In 2013, Kameny was inducted into the Legacy Walk, an outdoor public display in Chicago which celebrates LGBT history and people.

In 2015, Kameny received a U.S. Veterans Administration memorial headstone, at Washington, D.C.'s Congressional Cemetery at his memorial site; the headstone was dedicated during a ceremony on the morning of November 11, 2015, on Veterans Day. In front of the headstone is a marker inscribed with the slogan "Gay is Good". Kameny coined that slogan, and in a 2009 AP interview said about coining it, "If I am remembered for anything I hope it will be that."

In June 2019, Kameny was one of the inaugural fifty American "pioneers, trailblazers, and heroes" inducted on the National LGBTQ Wall of Honor within the Stonewall National Monument (SNM) in New York City's Stonewall Inn. The SNM is the first U.S. national monument dedicated to LGBTQ rights and history, and the wall's unveiling was timed to take place during the 50th anniversary of the Stonewall riots.

The National LGBTQ+ Bar Association presents the Frank Kameny Award annually in honor of Kameny, the only recipient of the association's Dan Bradley Award who was not a law school graduate, to a member of the LGBTQ+ community who has paved the way for important legal victories without a United States Juris Doctor.

On June 2, 2021, Kameny was featured on that day's Google Doodle in celebration of Pride Month.
