= Tully Satre =

American blogger (born 1989)

- Born: Tully Meehan Satre; May 17, 1989 (age 37); Dover, Delaware, U.S.
- Education: New York University Tisch School of the Arts; Theatre Conservatory; School of the Art Institute of Chicago (BFA); Royal Academy of Arts
- Occupations: Artist, writer, gay rights activist
- Website: tullysatre.com

Tully Meehan Satre (born May 17, 1989, in Dover, Delaware) is an American artist, writer and former gay rights youth activist based in Chicago and London. He received a Bachelor of Fine Arts from the School of the Art Institute of Chicago in 2011 and is a current candidate for a postgraduate diploma from the Royal Academy of Arts in London, though he was refused a student visa.

Satre was known for his involvement at a young age in gay rights activism in Virginia, which he put behind after moving to Chicago in 2007 for school, though he still wrote for The Advocate at the time.

During the Summer of 2006, Satre attended the NYU Tisch School of the Arts CAP 21 Studio for Musical Theatre.

In 2007, he attended one semester at The Theatre Conservatory of Chicago College of Performing Arts at Roosevelt University, majoring in musical theater.

== Activism ==
=== Fauquier and Culpeper Counties, Virginia ===
In June 2005, Tully Satre founded Equality Fauquier-Culpeper in the rural suburbs of Greater Washington. From its founding, Equality Fauquier-Culpeper gained wide media coverage in numerous national and local publications including The Washington Post, The Washington Blade, and The Advocate. Satre served as the executive director of Equality Fauquier-Culpeper, which was headquartered in Warrenton, Virginia, from its inception until June 2007 at which point he stepped down from his position with Equality Fauquier-Culpeper and moved to Chicago to attend school.

At 16 years of age, Tully Satre, is spearheading one of the most controversial equality groups in Culpeper and Fauquier counties.

"We're living in two very conservative counties that have a great amount of discrimination with no policies or laws protecting gay citizens," Satre said. "I am an activist, I'll always be an activist and age is just a number and can never define a person's capabilities." Satre, founder and executive director of Equality Fauquier/Culpeper (EFC), said the reason he wanted to create an organization that reached out to the gay, lesbian, bisexual, transgender (GLBT) and questioning community is so that equal rights might one day be established.

Pamela Kulick / Staff Writer / Culpeper News / 18 August 2005

Tully Satre began a blog in 2006 on LiveJournal documenting his youth activism. Shortly after Satre's blog was launched, AMERICAblog's John Aravosis discovered Satre's online journal after the youth activist wrote about this experience confronting U.S. Senator George Allen at a town hall meeting in Culpeper, an encounter that drew the spotlight on Satre and his work. The debacle about Allen's lack of support for a federal hate crimes bill protecting people based on their sexual orientation, drew nationwide attention on the young activist.

Satre's story flew across the social media stratosphere (from Andrew Sullivan's blog, Pam's House Blend, to The Advocate's online edition of their magazine) and was widely covered in local and national print. The New York Times described Satre as "a pony-tailed 16-year-old" who confronted Allen at the town hall meeting geared towards Allen's possible 2008 presidential bid. Local press such as the Fredericksburg Free Lance-Star, and the Culpeper Star-Exponent also took to Satre's debacle with Senator Allen. Two months after Allen's run-in with Satre, the veteran Senator made a notorious comment while campaigning, contributing to Allen's notorious image with the press. Allen lost the election and was succeeded by Senator Jim Webb.

With stronger local support following the media bliss for Equality Fauquier-Culpeper, Satre began sharing the story of his experiences as a gay youth from rural Virginia outside his hometown. He appeared on television and radio shows such as Gay USA with Andy Humm, OutQ on Sirius Satellite Radio with Michelangelo Signorile, and was the first student to appear on Richmond's Education Radio.

=== Statewide, Virginia ===
In January 2006, Tully founded Commonwealth Education Equality Virginia (CEEVA), a statewide organization advocating for GLBT/Q youth. He served as president from 2006 to 2007 but is no longer involved with the organization. In 2007, CEEVA was merged into the Virginia Safe Schools Project.

Satre was nominated to serve on the board of directors for Equality Virginia, to become the first teenager to serve on a statewide gay rights organization in the United States but could not accept the position because he was under the age of 18.

=== Other ===
In 2006 Satre founded The Voice Project for LGBTQI Equality, Support & Inclusion, an internet outreach program for GLBT/Q youth which also promotes civic participation among teens for equality. (TVP formed as a national web and community-based organization which sponsors the online network project known as Equality Myspace.)

In 2006 and 2007, Satre worked with the Creative Youth Theater Foundation and Loudoun Youth Initiative in an original production about bullying. The development of the show was covered in an article in The Washington Post, which highlighted Satre's involvement with the play:

Tully Satre, 17, says he knows what it's like to be bullied. He knows how it feels to be called names and ostracized.

"I'm gay and I go to a Catholic school. You get the picture there," said the senior at Notre Dame Academy in Middleburg.

But through his involvement in "Normal," a play about bullying and the teenage experience, he has come to understand that he's a bully, too.

"What's so intense about this process is that we realize we've all been bullies, that some of the things we've said or done could have hurt other people. It's been very awakening," said Satre, one in a cast of 26 students from Loudoun and Fauquier county schools.

Arianne Aryanpur / Washington Post Staff Writer / The Washington Post / 25 January 2007

In August 2007 Satre's "The Voice Project" changed leadership as Satre moved to Chicago. The project no longer appears to be active.

Beginning in May 2010, Satre served for one year on the Associate Board for the Illinois Maternal & Child Health Coalition.

In March 2010, Northern Virginia Magazine featured Satre in an article about gay marriage in Virginia. The article mentions that Satre was told by police to leave a neighborhood (despite a 2002 U.S. Supreme Court ruling) for canvassing against an anti-marriage amendment.

== Writing ==
=== The Advocate ===
Fueled by the popularity of Satre's story, The Advocate began publishing weekly op-eds written by Satre in May 2006 written by the youth activist.

Satre's article on bisexuality, "I'm no faggot, I'm bisexual", published on Advocate.com, was the subject of much controversy for the young writer. After receiving an overwhelming response, Satre released a rebuttal to statements made against him in several online gay commentaries. Shortly thereafter, Satre was also widely reprimanded on the blogosphere for his position on the death of Jerry Falwell in his article "No Class" from May 2007.

Satre's most recent article for The Advocate, an op-ed about banning LGBTQ-themed books, was published on April 14, 2014.

=== Journalism ===
In October 2007, Satre began writing new features for Chicago's Windy City Times. Though primarily objective reporting, Satre has published a few op-eds similar to his work with The Advocate.

== Exhibitions ==
In May 2012, Satre exhibited a series of paintings in a studio in Chicago's Fine Arts Building after the UK refused to issue him a student visa to attend the Royal Academy of Arts.

- NEXT: The Invitational Exhibition of Emerging Art (Chicago, Illinois), April 2011 through May 2011, Represented by the Nicole Villeneuve Gallery
- Sullivan Galleries (Chicago, Illinois), March 2011 through April 2011, School of the Art Institute's Spring 2011 Undergraduate Exhibition
- Spill (Chicago, Illinois), October 2010 through April 2011, Betty Rymer Gallery

== Collections ==
- Dr. Walter E. Massey, President of the School of the Art Institute of Chicago

== Awards and nominations ==
- Nippon Steel U.S.A., Inc. / SAIC Presidential Awards Competition, "Nippon 18," December 2010
- New Society Presidential Merit Scholarship, January 2008
- Capital Pride Hero, 2006
- Colin Higgins Foundation, Nomination
