= Duplex Cabaret Theatre =

LGBT piano bar in Manhattan, New York, U.S.

The Duplex
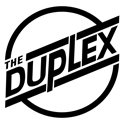

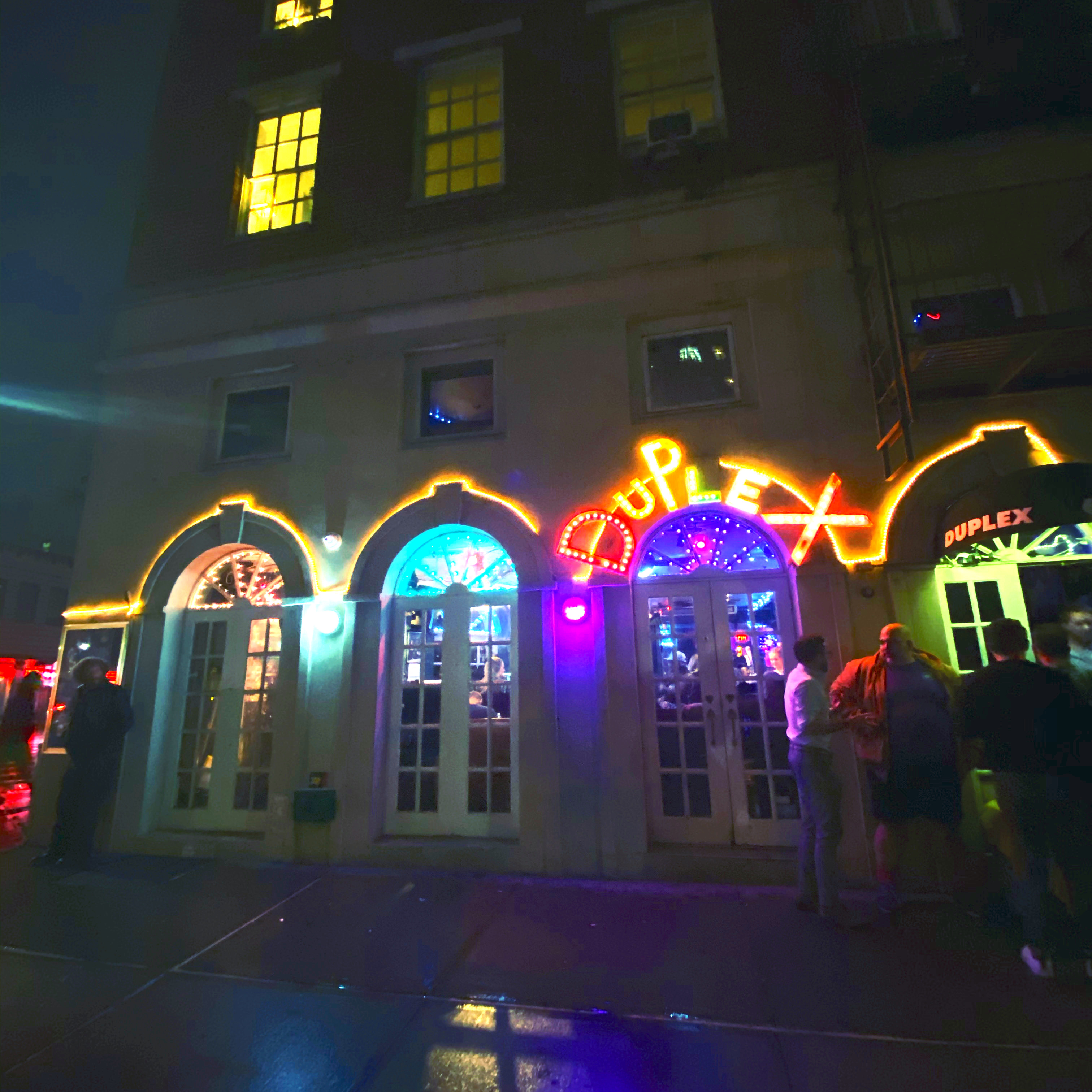
- Entrance of The Duplex
- Interactive map of The Duplex
- Location: 61 Christopher Street; Manhattan, New York City 10014
- Coordinates: 40.73378°N 74.00249°W
- Owner: Tony DeCicco
- Type: Gay bar; piano bar; cabaret

Construction
- Opened: 1951

Website
- Official website

The Duplex, also known as The Duplex Piano Bar and Cabaret, is a historical gay bar, piano bar, and cabaret theater in the Greenwich Village neighborhood in Manhattan, New York City. The Duplex originally opened in 1951 on 55 Grove Street nearby in the same neighborhood, and moved to its current location at 61 Christopher Street in 1989.

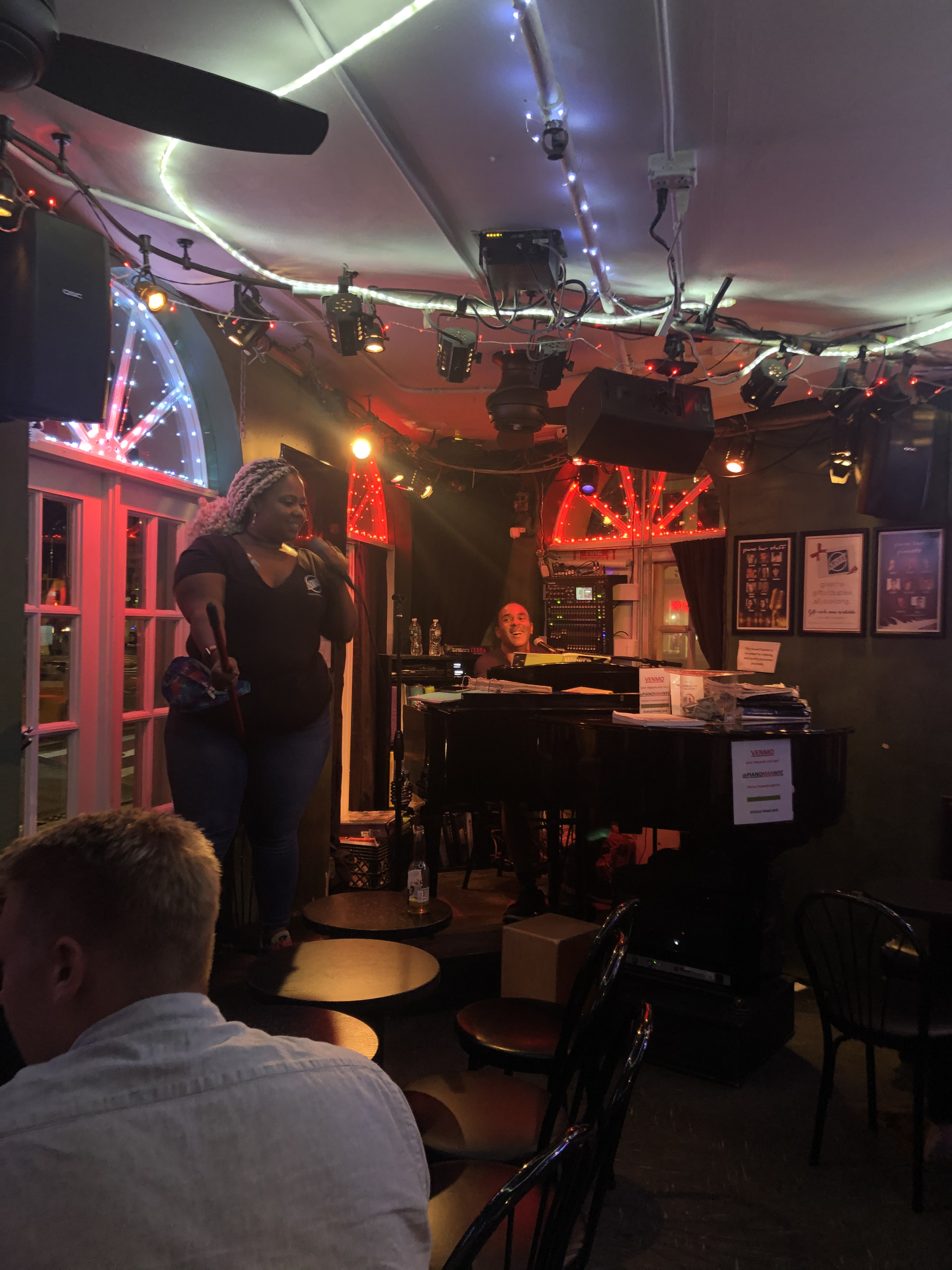
A Duplex bartender, Taylor-Rey “T-Rex” J’Vera, performs in the Piano Bar with Darius Frowner on the keys

It currently consists of a piano bar on the ground level that opens up to a patio café and a lounge bar upstairs leading to the cabaret theatre, also on the second floor. The piano bar features a regular lineup of piano players, singing bartenders, and open-mic events while the upstairs bar features dance music and drag performances. The cabaret theater hosts a variety of musical, theatre, and comedy performances.

== History ==
=== Early years ===
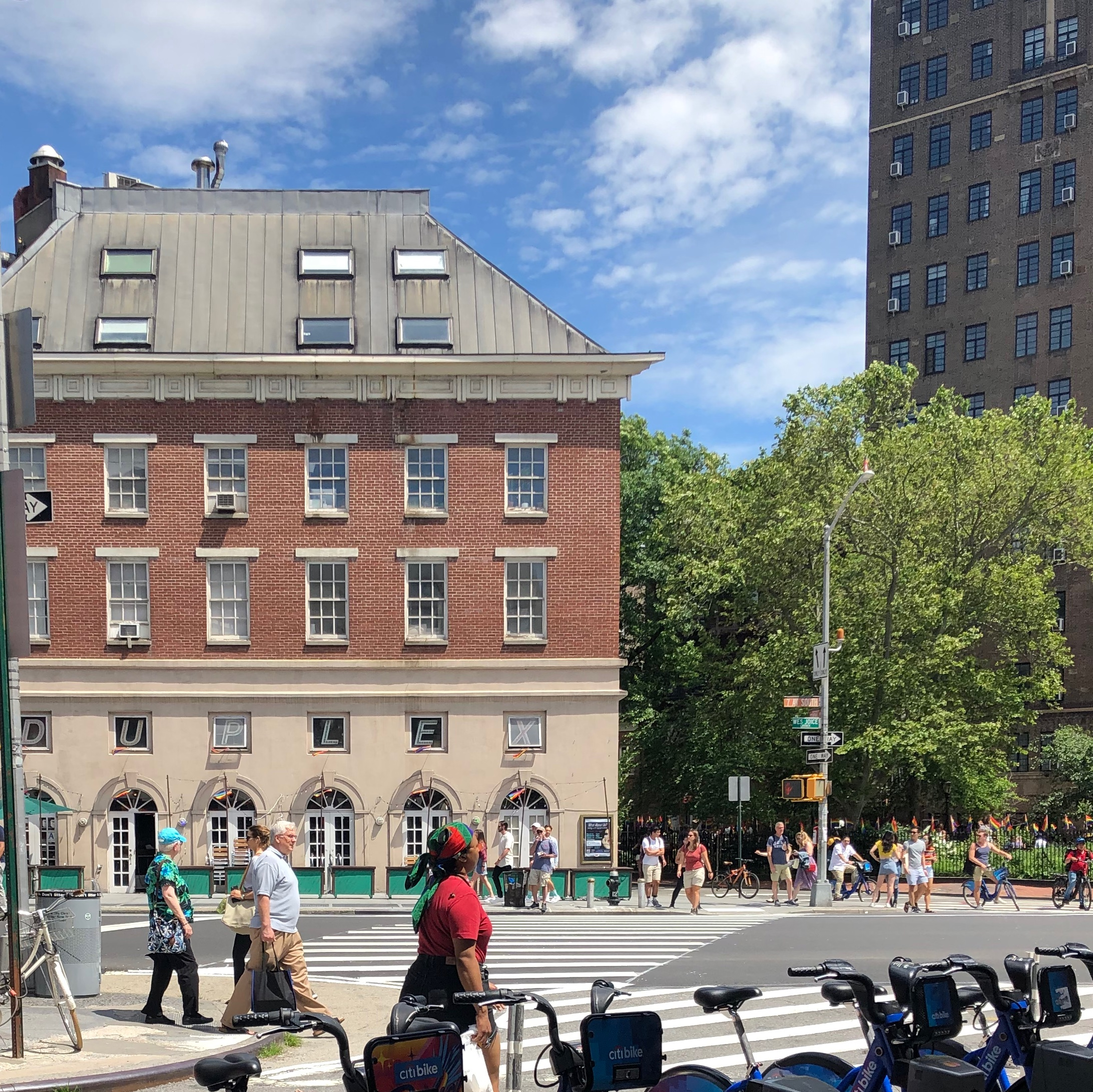
Current location of The Duplex overlooking Sheridan Square

The Duplex originally opened in 1951 on 55 Grove Street, between 7th Avenue and Bleecker Street, founded by then-owner Jimmy di Martino. In 1955, he leased the second-floor bar to singer Lovelady Powell, pianist Brooks Morton, and actor Hal Holbrook. The trio began transforming the second floor into a nightclub performance venue which opened in September 1955 with the name “Upstairs-at-the-Duplex.”

The three performers and co-managers used the performance space as a place to workshop and try out new material. They performed a show in which Powell sang dramatic renditions of songs by Cole Porter, Harold Arlen, George Gershwin, Bart Howard and others accompanied by Morton. After an intermission followed a routine in which Holbrook impersonated Mark Twain. Holbrook’s act, Mark Twain Tonight!, later moved to Broadway in 1966, earning a Tony for Best Performance by a Leading Actor in a Play and an Emmy nomination for its CBS TV special. The trio performed their 90-minute show three times a night for tourists and locals alike, as Greenwich village had been experiencing a resurgence as a center for night life in New York City.

Within months, Upstairs-at-the-Duplex had gained notoriety as a popular hotspot, including reviews in the New Yorker and Variety magazines, the latter often mentioning celebrities spotted enjoying shows there. According to TV-Radio Mirror, “It is a quiet intimate little place, so delightful that following the premiere of Guys and Dolls, Marlon Brando, Jean Simmons, Wally Cox, and a group of friends came in for ‘a few minutes, and stayed for hours.’” Powell and Morton also released an album of songs they performed there titled ‘’Lovelady: Upstairs at the Duplex with Lovey Powell and Brooks Morton.’’ Noticing the success of his upstairs bar, owner di Martino wished to be more involved. The three managers objected to many of his proposed changes and left The Duplex in 1956. Though little information is available about performances in the three years that followed, listings in The Village Voice suggest that di Martino continued booking acts or leasing the space as he had done previously until 1959, when Jan Wallman took over as manager of the venue.

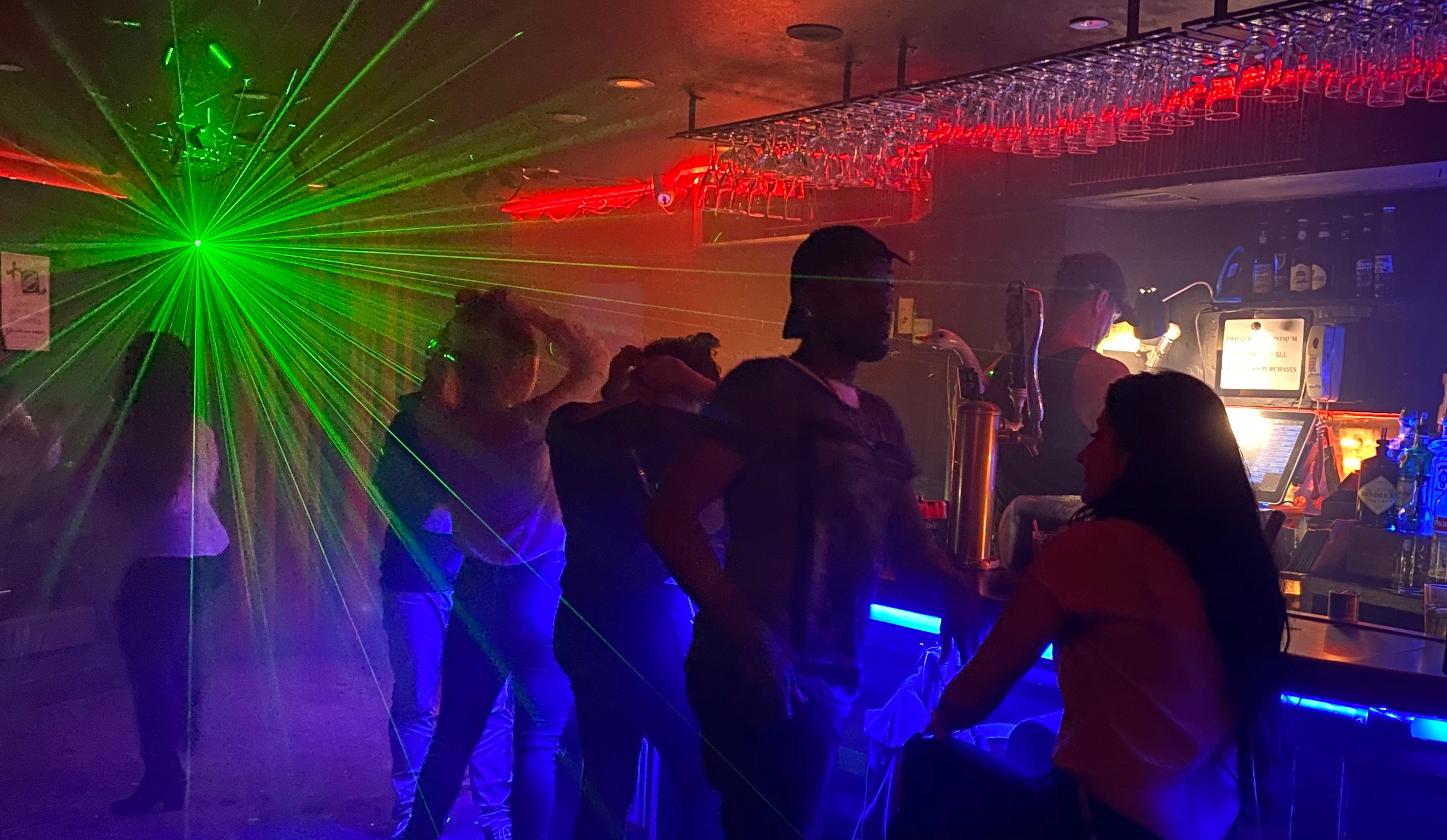
Upstairs at The Duplex

== Notable performers ==
- Alf Klimek
- Ann Hampton Callaway
- Anne Meara
- Barbra Streisand
- Bert Convy
- Betty Rhodes
- Bill Cosby
- Charles Busch
- Chicago City Limits
- Claiborne Cary
- Dava Savel
- David Brenner
- David Frye
- David St. James
- David Strassman
- Dawn Hampton
- Denny Dillon
- Dick Cavett
- Dick Gautier
- Dinah Lenney
- Don Francks
- Faith Dane
- Fred Willard
- George Furth
- Hal Holbrook
- Holly Woodlawn
- "Professor" Irwin Corey
- Jack Betts
- Jane Anderson
- Janet Lawson
- Jason Graae
- Jeanna Michaels
- Jennifer Warren
- Jerry Stiller
- Jo Anne Worley
- Jo Mapes
- Joan Rivers
- Joanne Beretta
- John Byner
- John Melfi
- John Paul Hudson
- John Wallowitch
- June Squibb
- Karen Mason
- Keith Christopher
- Larry Hankin
- Lee Roy Reams
- Leslie Randall
- Linda Lavin
- Liz Callaway
- London Lee
- Loni Ackerman
- Louis St. Louis
- Lovelady Powell
- Lynne Lipton
- Marshall Brickman
- Mary Louise Wilson
- Mary-Pat Green
- Michael Callen
- Michael Dunn
- Nancy LaMott
- Nathan Lane
- Pamela Shaw
- Ralston Hill
- Rhonda Hansome
- Richard Pryor
- Rick Crom
- Robert Klein
- Rodney Dangerfield
- Rosalind Cash
- Ruth Buzzi
- Sal Piro
- Sam Anderson
- Shelly Burch
- Stanley Kamel
- Stanley Myron Handelman
- Steve Landesberg
- Sylvia Syms
- Vaughn Meader
- Veronica Nunn
- Woody Allen

=== Notable shows and performances ===
- Mark Twain Tonight!, later winning a Tony Award and Emmy nomination for its Broadway production and CBS broadcast.
- The original 38-week run of The Nunsense Story, precursor to the Off-Broadway Nunsense
- Mostly Sondheim, a musical-theatre open mic that ran from 2004 to 2016, music directed by Brian Nash.

== Popular culture ==
- In the episode titled "Between a Rock and Harlin's Place" of the NBC sitcom Will and Grace, Jack performs his one-man show "Just Jack" at The Duplex.
- In the children's musical comedy special John Mulaney & the Sack Lunch Bunch (2019), Jonah Mussolini describes a fictional book titled "Sascha's Dad Does Drag" in the show's "What Are You Reading" segment in which a young boy spies on his father performing in drag at The Duplex.
- The December 5, 2020 episode of Saturday Night Live included a sketch which was set at The Duplex featuring Cecily Strong and Bowen Yang.

== Reception ==
The Duplex ranked number 35 on NewNowNext's list of the "50 Most Popular Gay Bars in the United States" in 2019.

== See also ==
- LGBTQ culture in New York City
