= New York City Gay Rights Bill of 1986 =

Anti-discrimination law in New York City

The New York City Gay Rights Bill was an anti-discrimination bill passed on March 20, 1986, in a New York City Council vote of 21–14 as Local Law 2 of 1986.

The purpose of the bill was to provide protections from discrimination to New York City's LGBTQ+ population in three main areas: housing, employment and public accommodations. If violated, punishment included up to $500 in fines and up to one year in jail. The bill had a long legislative history, dating back to 1971 as Intro 475. It took 15 years before the final version of the bill was passed, and this was due to opposition from many sides such as city council members, religious organizations, and labor unions. The city became the 51st city in the country to pass and enact anti-discrimination legislation.

== Legislative history ==
The initial measure of the bill was first introduced by New York City Council Minority Leader Eldon R. Clingan on June 2, 1970, in an effort to extend the city's fair employment practices law. This would prohibit discrimination in employment on the basis of sexual orientation or preference. He was joined by fellow council members Carter Burden, Leonard Scholnick and Ted Weiss, where it became known as "Intro 475". The bill was later expanded to prohibit discrimination in housing and public accommodations. On January 6, 1971, it was introduced to the New York City Council. The bill amended the law which had originally established the Commission on Human Rights, by including “sexual orientation" in the list of already protected classes: race, creed, and national origin. It was the first bill of its kind to provide protections against discrimination for LGBTQ people in the United States. The bill barely made it out of the City Council’s General Welfare Committee, chaired by Bronx Council Member Aileen B. Ryan. Thomas J. Cuite appointed opponents of gay rights to the General Welfare Committee to prevent the bill from getting a full floor vote in the Council.

== Opposition to the bill ==
Delays in passing the bill were partly due to misinformation that was spread about the legislation's content and purpose. Opponents of the bill claimed that it was promoting homosexual "lifestyles", arguing that it provided ways for homosexuals to receive special treatment, or established affirmative action quotas for hiring homosexual employees. Public statements from labor unions and conservative religious organizations helped create and reinforce these popular misconceptions about the bill. One notable opponent was the Uniformed Fire Officers Association, which spent $10,000 in ads against the bill in 1974, when the bill received a full floor vote in City Council.

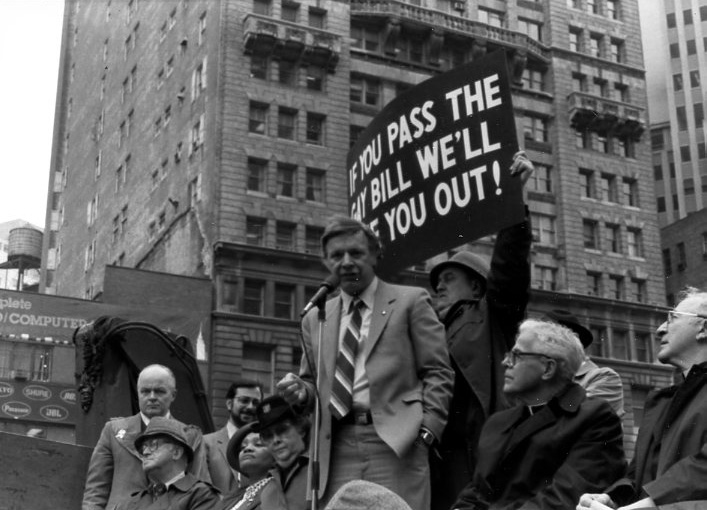
Speaker of the City Council Peter Vallone Sr. at an anti-gay rights rally.

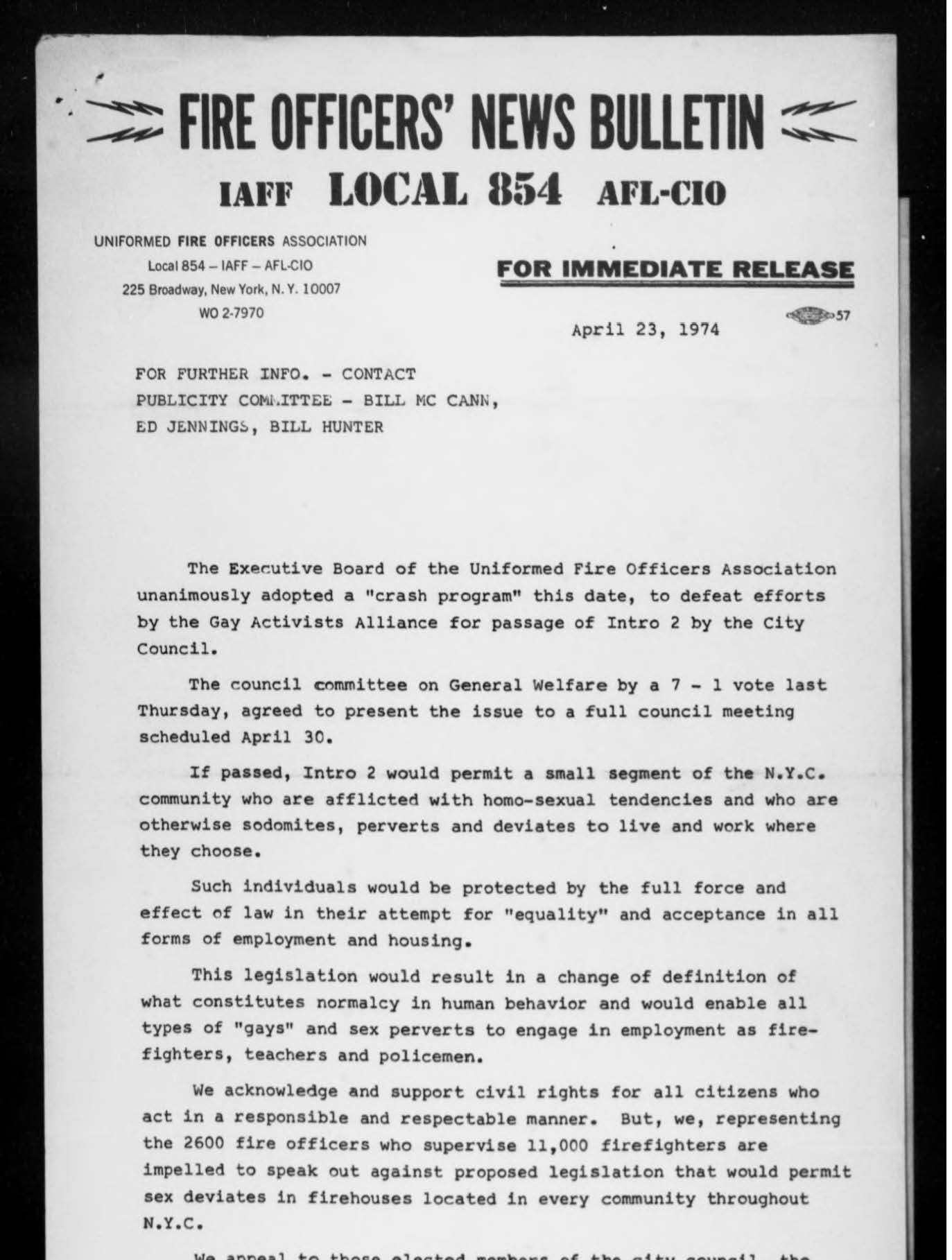
Fire Officers' News Bulletin, released April 23, 1974 arguing against Intro 475, an anti-discrimination bill providing protections to gay and lesbian New Yorkers.

In justifying their opposition to the bill's employment protections, the Fire Officers' Association referred to gay people as "perverts" and "deviates", and in another statement, urged that "All members of the [firefighter] team have to be a man’s man." Another opponent of the bill was the Roman Catholic Archdiocese of New York, which stated that the bill was a "menace to family life." The bill was given more attention in 1984 after Mayor Koch lost a case in the New York State Supreme Court against the New York Catholic Archdiocese, Agudath Israel, and other religious organizations. Mayor Koch had decreed Executive Order No. 50 to expand protections to gay and lesbian people in the workplace. However, religious organizations who had contracts with the city feared that the executive order and the gay rights bill would negatively impact their contracts. Further opposition from constituents via phone call and mail caused some council members to sway away from supporting the bill. Brooklyn City Council member Noach Dear, who represented an Orthodox Jewish community, stated that passage of the bill would be a “catastrophe for the city."

Thomas J. Cuite, a councilman representing Red Hook, Brooklyn, was a major opponent of the bill. Cuite was a devout Catholic, and many believed him to be the sole reason the bill did not see passage for as long as it had. Andy Humm of the Coalition for Lesbian and Gay Rights stated “if it weren’t for Cuite, it would have passed in 1974. But the way it was, you voted the way Cuite wanted or you didn't get your mail for a month." It was also said that Cuite "stacked" opponents of the bill into the General Welfare Committee, preventing it from passing to a general vote in the City Council. In 1973, another instance of Cuite's opposition reigned, when eight city council members signed a petition introduced by the Gay Activists Alliance to reintroduce the bill. However, Cuite refused to recognize the petition as proper legislative procedure, and denied the reintroduction of the bill for vote on the main floor of the City Council. The bill was introduced in January 1974 "Intro 2", and in June 1974 as "Intro 554".

== Activist pressure to pass the Gay Rights Bill ==
The Gay Activists Alliance was a key organization in both pressuring lawmakers to pass the bill and combating misinformation that was being spread by opponents. One of the first actions they took to garner support for the bill was through a report entitled Employment Discrimination Against Homosexuals, which they sent to the NYC Commission on Human Rights in February 1971. The report, produced by the Fair Employment Committee branch of the Gay Activists Alliance, detailed the instances of personal discrimination of employees in various workplaces; such as the Metropolitan Taxi Bureau, various New York City public schools and even large companies such as IBM. The report contained documentation of discriminatory practices made by employers, as well as descriptions of the Gay Activist Alliance's own strategies in terms of lobbying efforts for the Gay Rights Bill, such as how to amass public support, pressing for public hearings, and pressuring officials and the mayor.

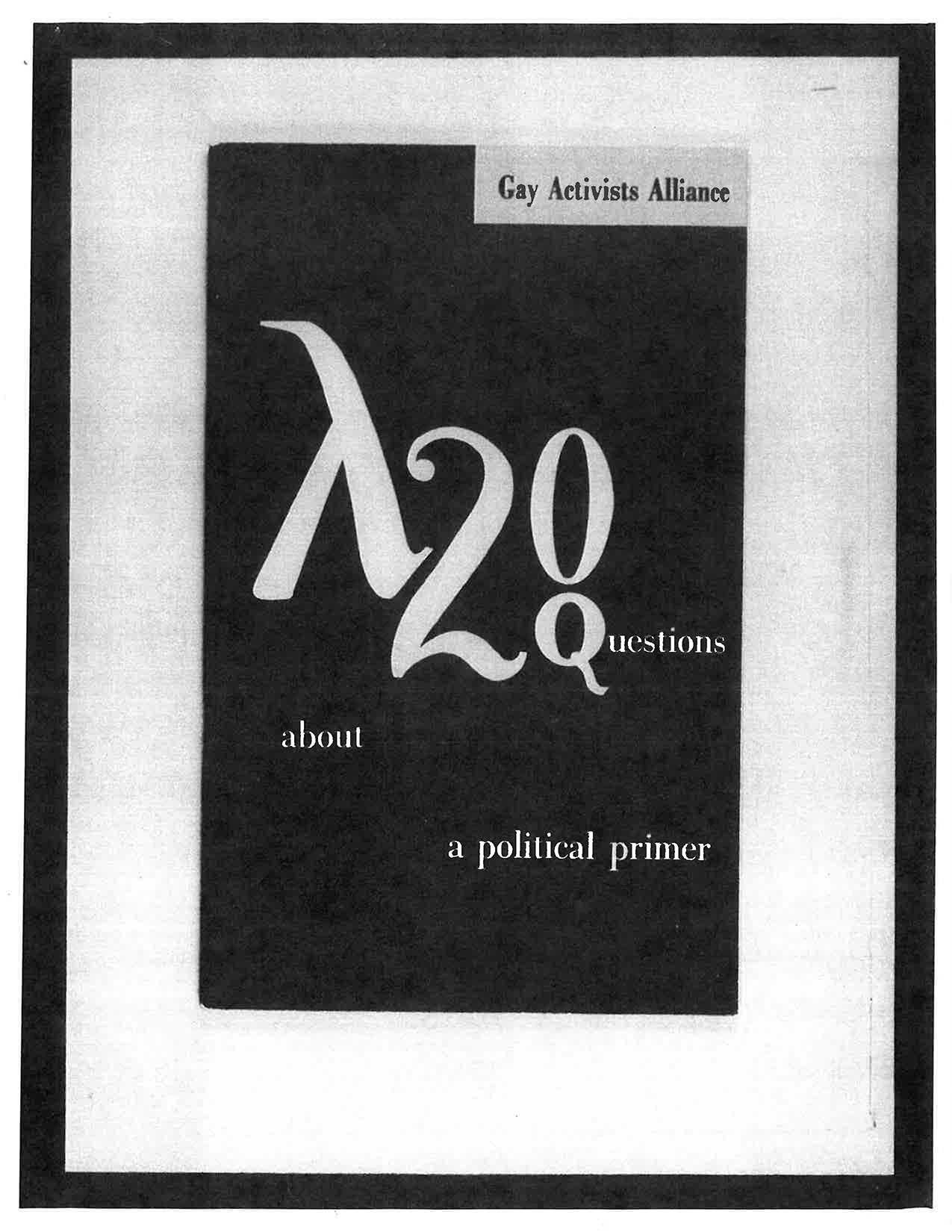
The GAA's "20 Questions" political primer

The GAA also attempted to educate the wider public by publishing a political primer entitled "20 Questions", which provided information that aimed to combat misconceptions about human sexuality. Each section of the primer posed a "frequently asked question" regarding sexual orientation, such as "Can a Person Change His or Her Sexual Orientation?" with the answers addressing anti-gay rhetoric that claimed that homosexuality was a choice or a "lifestyle". In their view, misinformation was what turned parts of the public away from supporting the Gay Rights Bill.

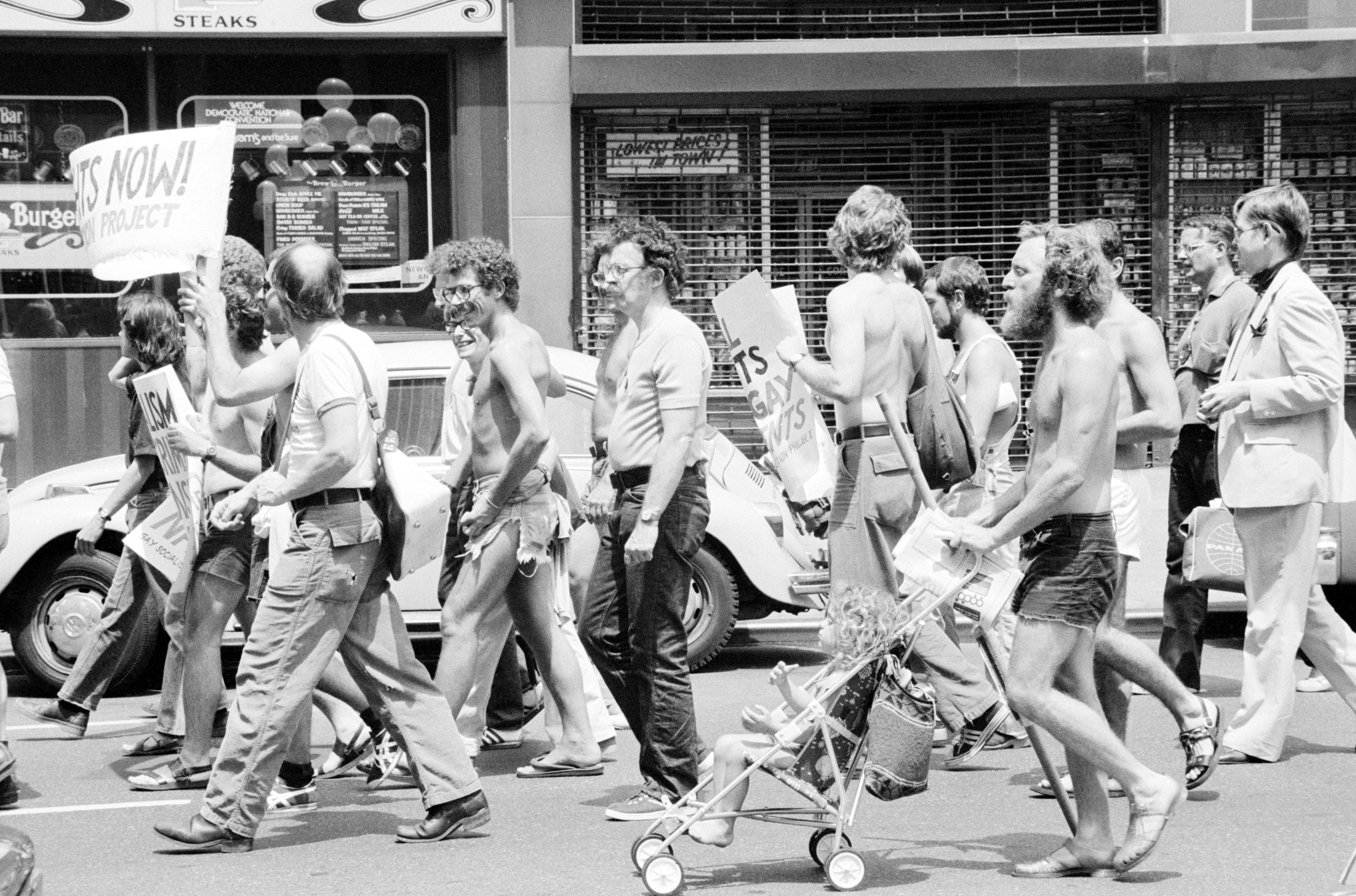
Gay Rights demonstration, NYC 1976

Another method the GAA stood by were "political zaps", a type of protest intended to pressure city officials to support and pass the bill. Many of these zaps took place in the early 1970s. One of the first was on June 25, 1971, when GAA members went to City Hall and began to picket and pressure Thomas J. Cuite; this event saw the arrest of the "Cuite 9", later acquitted. Their acquittal led to Cuite promising to meet with the GAA and the sponsors of Intro 475.

Councilman Saul Sharison, who was Chair of the Welfare Committee, was designated to Intro 475 by Thomas Cuite, but under his leadership, the committee had not met in two years to discuss the bill. As a result, the Gay Activists Alliance conducted zaps at Sharison's residence between September 30 and October 3, 1971, in order to push Sharison to release the bill. These zaps led to Sharison releasing the bill five days later for hearings, which took place between October 1971 and January 1972. There was another zap in 1973 at City Hall celebrations of the 75th anniversary of the City of Greater New York, at which Bruce Voeller and Sylvia Rivera were arrested.

The Coalition for Lesbian and Gay Rights (CLGR) was also instrumental in finally passing the bill in 1986. They formed in 1986 and were a coalition of gay and lesbian groups plus their supporters. Their goal was to defend and ensure the rights of the gay and lesbian population through “legislative, judicial, administrative and budgetary processes of government" as stated in Article I of their Constitution. It was about this time that the effort became known as the "Gay Rights Bill", though some supporters disapproved of this nickname. The CLGR organized and distributed materials to help educate the public about the bill and how to get involved. In a memo written on February 26, 1986, just weeks before the bill was passed, and sent to the mailing list of many supporters of the coalition, they emphasized the importance of turning out to the City Council hearings that would eventually serve as the catalyst for passage of the bill. Supporters were educated on how to participate in lobbying, such as through phone calls, written letters, and testifying at hearings. The coalition also partnered with various organizations, including religious organizations such as the Catholic Coalition for Gay Civil Rights, to hold press conferences at City Hall, with priests and nuns who supported the bill. It came close to getting support of the Brooklyn Catholic Diocese, with a positive view from auxiliary bishop Joseph Michael Sullivan.

== Religion ==
The bill was controversial within religious circles. In the 1980s, many council members in support of the bill kept a low profile due to religious pressure in their districts. When Koch testified about the bill, many within the Hasidic Jewish community protested his testimony. In the Roman Catholic Diocese of Brooklyn, Bishop Francis Mugavero led a campaign against the bill. The Holy Name Society, a Catholic group opposing the bill, maintained that existing laws protected gays and lesbians.

There were also religious proponents of the bill. Some Reform Jews approved of the bill, including Rabbi Balfour Brickner of the Stephen Wise Free Synagogue and members of Congregation Beth Simchat Torah, a synagogue founded in the special interest of gay and lesbian Jews looking for a place of worship. The Episcopal Diocese of New York, led by Bishop Paul Moore, was vocally supportive of the bill. There were also several Catholic proponents. Louis Gigante, a Catholic priest who was also a council member, went against the wishes of the Roman Catholic Archdiocese of New York and voted "yes" to the bill. Another Catholic priest, Bernárd Lynch, was moved to advocate for the bill by his experiences during The Troubles in Northern Ireland. His testimony also named Catholic bishops who spoke out in favor of legislation protecting gay and lesbians from social discrimination, such as Archbishop Raymond Hunthausen of Seattle and Archbishop Rembert Weakland of Milwaukee. Jeannine Gramick, a Catholic nun, testified on behalf of the National Coalition of American Nuns. In her testimony, she argued that Cardinal John O'Connor and Bishop Mugavero were emblematic of the Roman Catholic Church's lack of compassion and weak position on civil rights. Dignity, founded by a San Diego Catholic priest, approved of the bill.

== Race ==
Black and White Men Together/New York (subsequently known as Men of All Colors Together/New York) documented racially discriminatory admissions policies at gay discos, bars, and clubs in the city. From 1983 to 1985, MACT/NY members also worked with the New York City Human Rights Commission to chronicle discrimination against gay and lesbian New Yorkers in the areas of housing, employment, and public accommodations. The final report was issued in 1985 to Mayor Koch and to New York City Councilmembers. Black and White Men Together also engaged in consciousness-raising sessions allowing people to learn about internalized racism and how to resolve unlearning it. City Councilmember Frederick Samuel warned that the bill would negatively impact the Black community in Harlem.

== Documenting anti-LGBTQ+ violence to lobby for LGBTQ+ protections ==
The New York City Commission on Human Rights also played a large role in getting the bill to passage. In an attempt to pass the bill, the Commission produced a report that summarized their findings on cases of discrimination against LGBTQ+ people in New York City, and submitted it to the City Council in 1981. The report summarized the findings of a survey they conducted with thirty five gay men and lesbian women, who reported fourteen cases of discrimination on grounds of employment, eight in the case of housing, and five incidents regarding public accommodations. They also noted that the respondents who took part in the survey described an environment that cultivated fear, and that came as a result of physical and verbal abuse targeting their sexuality. As of 1983, the bill was introduced as "Intro 1".

An article published by the New York Times in 1986 also documented how violence against the homosexual population across the United States was at a high, compounded by the AIDS epidemic. At a hearing at the House Judiciary Committee for Criminal Justice, human rights groups presented a series of local, state, and national surveys that documented these cases of violence and their underlying causes. David M. Wertheimer, the executive director of the New York City Gay and Lesbian Anti-violence Project gave testimony which accounted for 351 anti-LGBTQ+ incidents that ranged from homicides to verbal attacks, within the first nine months of 1986. Less than half that number had occurred the year before, in 1985. Documenting the cases of discrimination and abuse became pivotal to the movement's cause, as it also spread awareness to what was happening in the city to the gay and lesbian population. Documentation also provided much needed evidence to further bolster their efforts in getting the bill passed.

== Trans activists' roles in passing the Gay Rights Bill ==
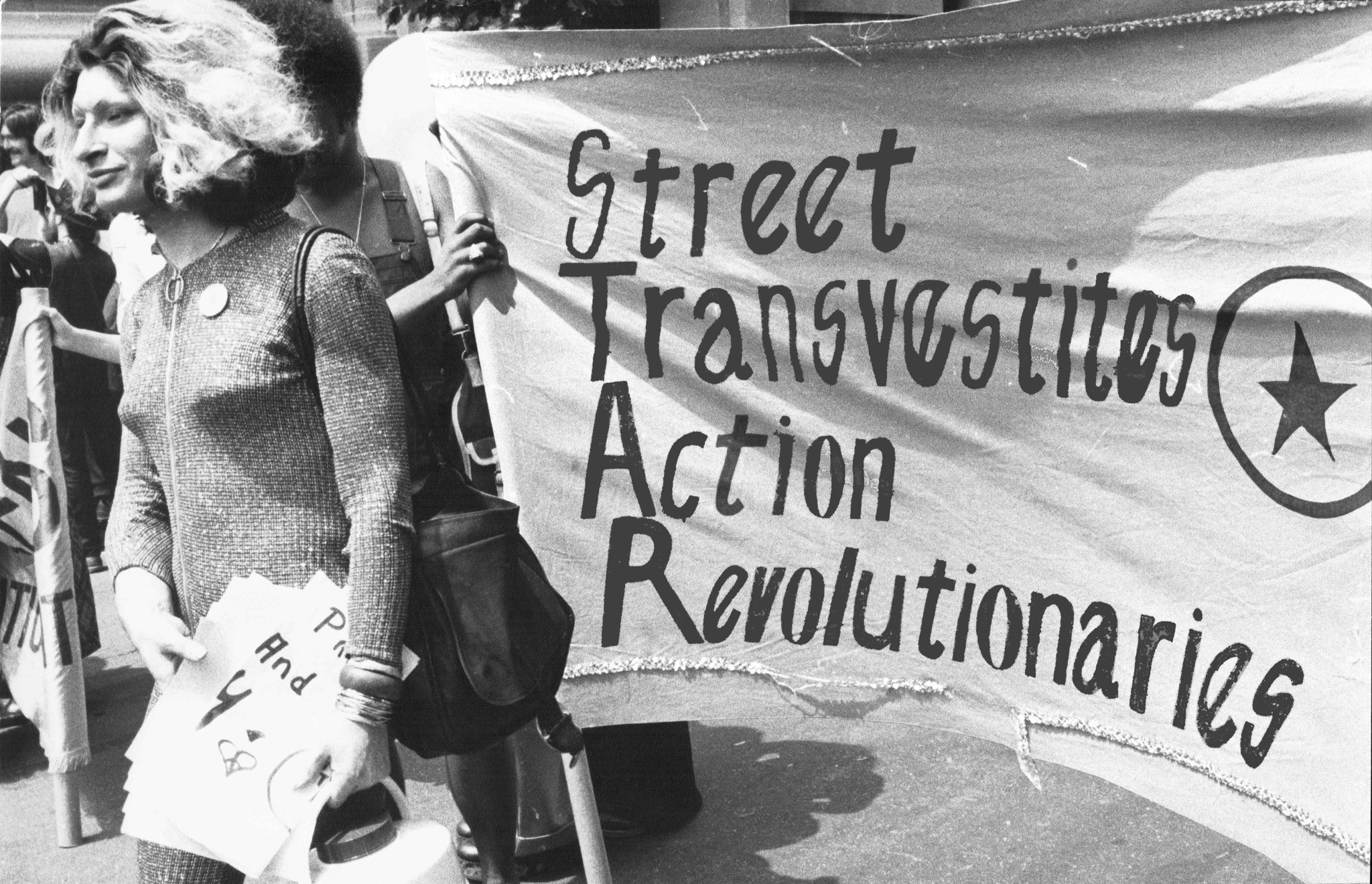
STAR Rally

Transgender activists played an important role in fighting for the bill early on. Sylvia Rivera was involved in the first efforts to get Intro 2 introduced into the City Council. In an interview, Rivera noted that she was the only activist who was arrested for petitioning people to sign for Intro 2, which Rivera claims originally included protections for the transgender community. However, in December 1973, an amendment was introduced to exclude “transvestism" from the list of people who would be protected from discrimination. Due to what Rivera described as a “backroom deal" in City Hall, lawmakers introduced an amendment excluding the transgender community in an effort to get it passed. As a result of the amendment, these transgender activists went on to continually push back against the exclusion and discrimination they have experienced from both the homosexual and heterosexual community. At a Gay Pride rally in June 1973, Sylvia Rivera spoke to the crowd on the ways that she fought for gay liberation but was not supported by the movement.

"I have been beaten, I have had my nose broken, I have been thrown in jail, I have lost my job, I have lost my apartment, for gay liberation. And you all treat me this way?...Men and women that belong to a white middle class, white club..that’s what you all belong to!"

-Sylvia Rivera at the 1973 Gay Pride Parade

Another notable figure was Marsha P. Johnson, who was involved in various gay rights groups, including the Gay Liberation Front and the Gay Activists Alliance, which actively worked to pass the GRB. Although she was involved in the earlier days of both groups, she grew frustrated with their exclusion of both transgender people and LGBTQ+ people of color. Along with Rivera, they founded STAR (Street Transvestite Action Revolutionaries) in 1970. They founded STAR as a safe haven to help transgender youth who had fallen on hard times. However, lack of support from gay rights organizations and economic circumstances eventually led to the dissolution of STAR. Despite this, it remained a great influence for many activists to follow and it was the first shelter of its kind for LGBTQ youth. Although transgender activists were instrumental in fighting for the Gay Rights Bill of 1986, it wasn't until 2002, that a separate civil rights bill was passed to ensure the rights of the transgender community in NYC. This later led to a more defined bill released in 2015, which explicitly detailed what is considered a violation under those laws. It sent a clear and concise message to the general public and also educated them on best practices in order to comply with them.
