= Gay USA =

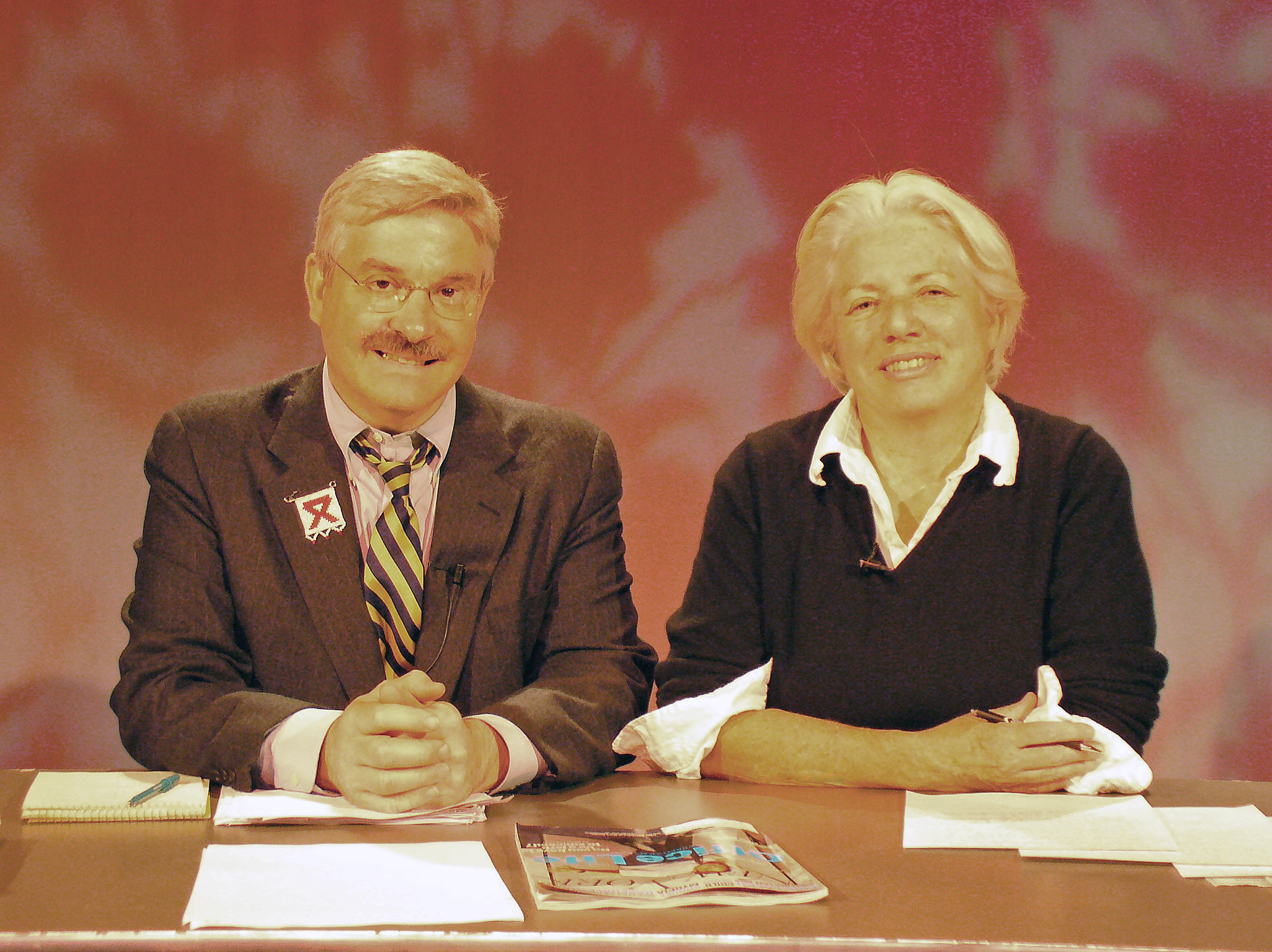
- Genre: News program
- Presented by: Andy Humm; Ann Northrop
- Country of origin: United States
- Original language: English

Production
- Producers: Bill Bahlman; Andy Humm; Ann Northrop
- Running time: 60 minutes

Original release
- Network: Manhattan Neighborhood Network; Free Speech TV
- Release: 1985

Related
- Pride and Progress

Gay USA is a weekly one-hour news program "...devoted to in-depth coverage of gay, lesbian, bisexual, and transgender issues" on a local, state, national, and international level. It is taped in the studios of, and aired by, Manhattan Neighborhood Network in Manhattan, New York. It airs on Manhattan Public-access television cable TV and Free Speech TV, and is available worldwide as a podcast at the show's website or to subscribe via iTunes.

== Current format ==
Typically, Gay USA begins with a quick introduction by hosts Andy Humm and Ann Northrop then moves into news segments as viewed from the gay perspective. Regular segments include gay news, AIDS news, and entertainment news. The anchors refer to notes kept in front of them on the table during this portion of the show. Hosts Humm and Northrop often interject their news delivery with accounts of personal experiences and "...light, snappy repartee and good-natured verbal sparring and banter." Following the news topics of the week, guests are interviewed and/or videos clips are presented for the second half of the show. Bill Bahlman, Associate Producer of Gay USA posts a weekly Podcast edition of the show which is available on iTunes and from the show's official website GayUSATV.org

== History ==
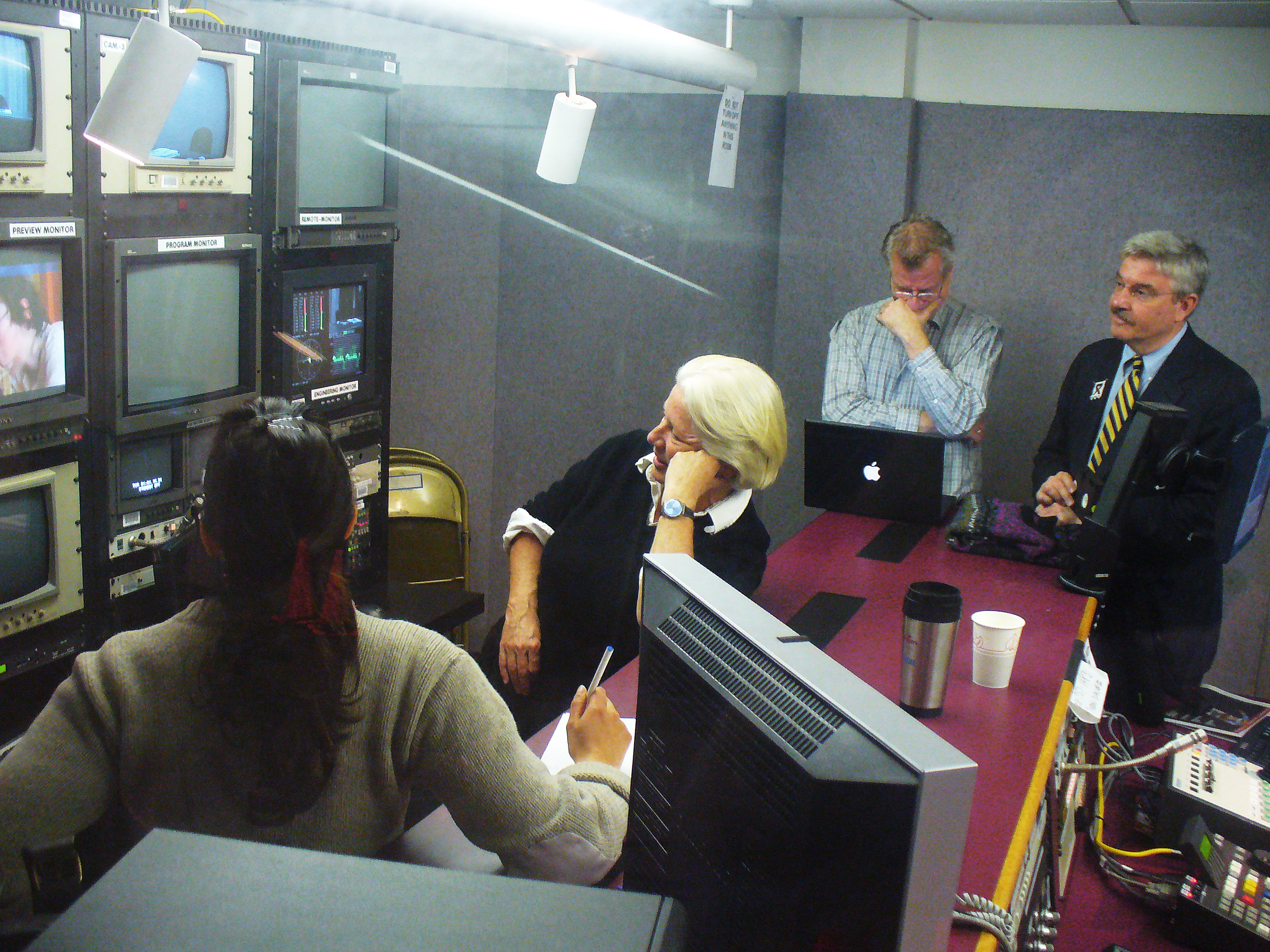
Northrop, Bahlman and Humm reviewing footage in the MNN production studio.

Gay USA was preceded by Pride and Progress which first aired in 1985 on the Gay Cable Network (GCN). Independently produced and supported by GCN owner Lou Maletta, Pride and Progress was hosted by journalist/activist Andy Humm. The program covered LGBTQ topics, including the Democratic and Republican National Conventions from a gay perspective.

In 1996, journalist/activist Ann Northrop began co-hosting Gay USA with Humm.

Bill Bahlman, Associate Producer of Gay USA has a long history as an LGBT Activist. Organizations he served with or helped found include the Gay Activists Alliance, GLAAD, CLGR, The Lavender Hill Mob, and ACTUP New York.

Since September 2001, the show has aired on Manhattan Neighborhood Network. In 2003, Gay USA became nationally available through Free Speech TV. Podcasts of the show became available in 2006.

On 21 February 2012 episode, show guest Daniel O'Donnell surprised hosts Andy Humm and Ann Northrop in presenting to each Pen Certificates signed by Governor Andrew Cuomo from the 2011 New York Marriage Equality Act, stating "I know of no one in the entire country who has done more for our community than the two of you". O'Donnell, a recurring guest, had introduced the same-sex marriage bill.

== Interviews and guests ==
Gay USA includes interviews of individuals regarding relevant projects, organizations or entertainment. Guests have ranged from an out-gay, and thus unemployed, priest to a gay male couple with adopted children to political figures and entertainers. Some of the program's notable guests have included:

- Edward Albee, three-time Pulitzer Prize–winning playwright
- Alison Bechdel, comic strip and graphic author, notably of Fun Home
- Wayne Besen, gay rights advocate
- Matthew Bourne, British choreographer
- Rev.Pat Bumgardner, Pastor of the Metropolitan Community Church
- Justice Edwin Cameron, senior South African official
- Thomas Duane, New York State Senator
- Martin Duberman, historian
- Marga Gomez, award-winning comedian
- Lesley Gore, singer and songwriter
- Alan Hollinghurst, author of award-winning The Line of Beauty
- Rabbi Sharon Kleinbaum, LGBT Synagogue
- Scott Long, executive director of LGBT Rights Project, Human Rights Watch
- Joseph Lovett, film maker, notably of Gay Sex in the 70s
- Michael Musto, columnist
- Christine Quinn, Speaker of the New York City Council
- Tully Satre, youth activist
- Sir Antony Sher, actor, novelist and artist
- Lily Tomlin, comedian who publicly came out on the show in 2000
- Tree, Stonewall Inn bartender
- Paula Vogel, Pulitzer Prize–winning playwright
- Kenji Yoshino, author as well as professor of intellectual life at Yale Law School

Organizations involved in LGBTQ rights and information dissemination have also been represented on the show by various guests. These include:

- ACLU Lesbian & Gay Rights Project: Litigation Director James Esseks; Matt Coles
- Equality Ride: Activists Haven Herrin & Jake Reitan
- Gay, Lesbian and Straight Education Network: Kevin Jennings
- Lambda Legal Defense and Education Fund: Attorney Alphonso David
- National Gay and Lesbian Task Force: Executive Director Matt Forman
- Sexuality Information and Education Council of the United States: Monica Rodriguez

== Gay USA Team ==
Frequently, the folks who work on and/or for Gay USA refer to themselves as the "Gay USA Team." In alphabetical order, the team currently consists of:

- Bill Bahlman – associate producer, photographer, archivist and activist
- Andy Humm – host, journalist/activist
- Ann Northrop – host, journalist/activist
- Rich Speziale – studio Director (employed by MNN)

== Guest co-hosts ==
Guest co-hosts who have filled in for either Humm or Northrop include:

- Corey Johnson, former speaker of the New York City Council
- Christian Cooper, science writer, comics writer and television personality

== See also ==
- Media of New York City
- Culture of New York City
- Sexuality and gender identity-based cultures
- The Soup
