= Manhattan Cable Television =

Manhattan Cable Television may refer to:

- HBO, an American television network and successor to Manhattan Cable Television
- Channel J, an American television channel distributed by Manhattan Cable Television
