= Channel J =

American public-access television channel

- Type: Public-access television
- Country: United States
- Broadcast area: New York City

Ownership
- Owner: Manhattan Cable Television

History
- Launched: 1976
- Closed: 1990

Channel J, operated by Manhattan Cable Television, was a public-access television channel broadcast from New York City from 1976 to 1990. It became famous and controversial for its lack of censorship and its depiction of marginalized communities and taboo themes. As a public access channel, every subscriber to cable television in Manhattan received the channel as part of basic cable service.

Channel J distributed The Emerald City, one of the first television series created by and for LGBTQ people. It also aired straight and gay pornography on shows such as Midnight Blue, The Robin Byrd Show, Men and Films, Blurbs, and Interludes After Midnight, a nude talk show. The channel's robust LGBTQ representation led to the saying "Gay on J."

Other shows that aired on Channel J include The Big Giveaway (New York cable television's first game show), The Live! Show, and The Ugly George Hour of Truth, Sex, and Violence.

Manhattan Cable Television provided free studio space for anyone to use on a first-come, first-served basis. Producers were simply required to pay an hourly rate of $50 for airtime (equivalent to $283 in 2025), with rights to resell the airtime to advertisers.

Channel J has been described as "a funhouse mirror of mainstream network programs" by The Wall Street Journal.

== Programming ==
=== The Big Giveaway ===
The Big Giveaway was a game show produced by 24-year-old Arnie Rosenthal that allowed subscribers the opportunity to win prizes by participating via telephone. According to The New Yorker, it was the first game show to air on cable television in New York. Rosenthal later started Score on the Financial News Network.

Title card for The Emerald City, one of the first-ever LGBTQ television shows

=== The Emerald City ===
The Emerald City was an American television series and self-proclaimed "world's first television show for gay men and women" that aired twice weekly on Channel J from 1976 to 1979. It began in New York City and was later syndicated to San Francisco and Los Angeles. Episodes were originally an hour long and then switched to half-hour in the fall of 1977.

The Emerald City was produced by Truth, Justice, and American Way Inc., which was overseen by Gene Stavis (executive producer), Frank O'Dowd (writer-director), James Chladek (co-producer), and Steven Bie, a former lover of O'Dowd (producer, advertising and marketing).

The show covered the LGBTQ movement, politics, and culture in the pre-AIDS era. It featured an assortment of national LGBTQ news, interviews, music videos, and live performances (such as cabaret and singing) recorded on compact cassette. Its on-air talent included journalists Arthur Bell, Vito Russo, and Brandon Judell.

Guests on the show included Arthur Bressan Jr, Divine, Casey Donovan, Wayland Flowers, Selma Hazouri, David Hockney, John Paul Hudson, Grace Jones, Jonathan Ned Katz, Ken Kilban, James Kirkwood Jr., Larry Kramer, Charles Ludlam, Jean O'Leary, Leonard Matlovich, Butterfly McQueen, Wakefield Poole, and John Waters.

The show was entirely supported by advertising proceeds. Its commercials predominantly featured LGBTQ businesses such as Man's Country bathhouse and Mandate magazine. Other advertisements promoted books by Wilhelm von Gloeden and Andrew Holleran, Jan Wallman's restaurant, and the pornographic film El Paso Wrecking Corp.

For many involved in the making of the show, The Emerald City was "about building up [gay] culture," not just profit. In a 2018 interview, Wakefield Poole said, "We were very happy to have […] a platform to put ideas out there and what [sic] life was really like to be gay." To Ken Kilban, "it was a liberating and elevating and enlightening experience. It was… a cultural event. It really had very little to do with sex." Steven Brie described a sense of optimism that the show imbued (a coming "great new world for gay people") and the excitement of celebrating successful people "not minding just saying matter of fact that they were gay."

Title card for Interludes After Midnight starring Dan Landers

=== Interludes After Midnight ===
Interludes After Midnight billed itself as a "nude TV talk show." It was hosted by Dan Landers, who owned a swingers club called "Midnight Interludes" and who interviewed his guests while naked at 10 P.M. on Mondays. A frequent guest was Ron Jeremy, then at the beginning of his porn star career. In 1989, the Chicago Tribune pilloried the show as a "loose, lewd, boring talk show featuring nude numbskull nobodies."

=== The Live! Show ===
The Live! Show, conceived and produced by Jaime Davidovitch, ran from 1979 to 1984. The variety show featured interviews with celebrities such as Laurie Anderson and Eric Bogosian, live performances by stars such as Robert Kushner, art lessons, and home shopping segments.

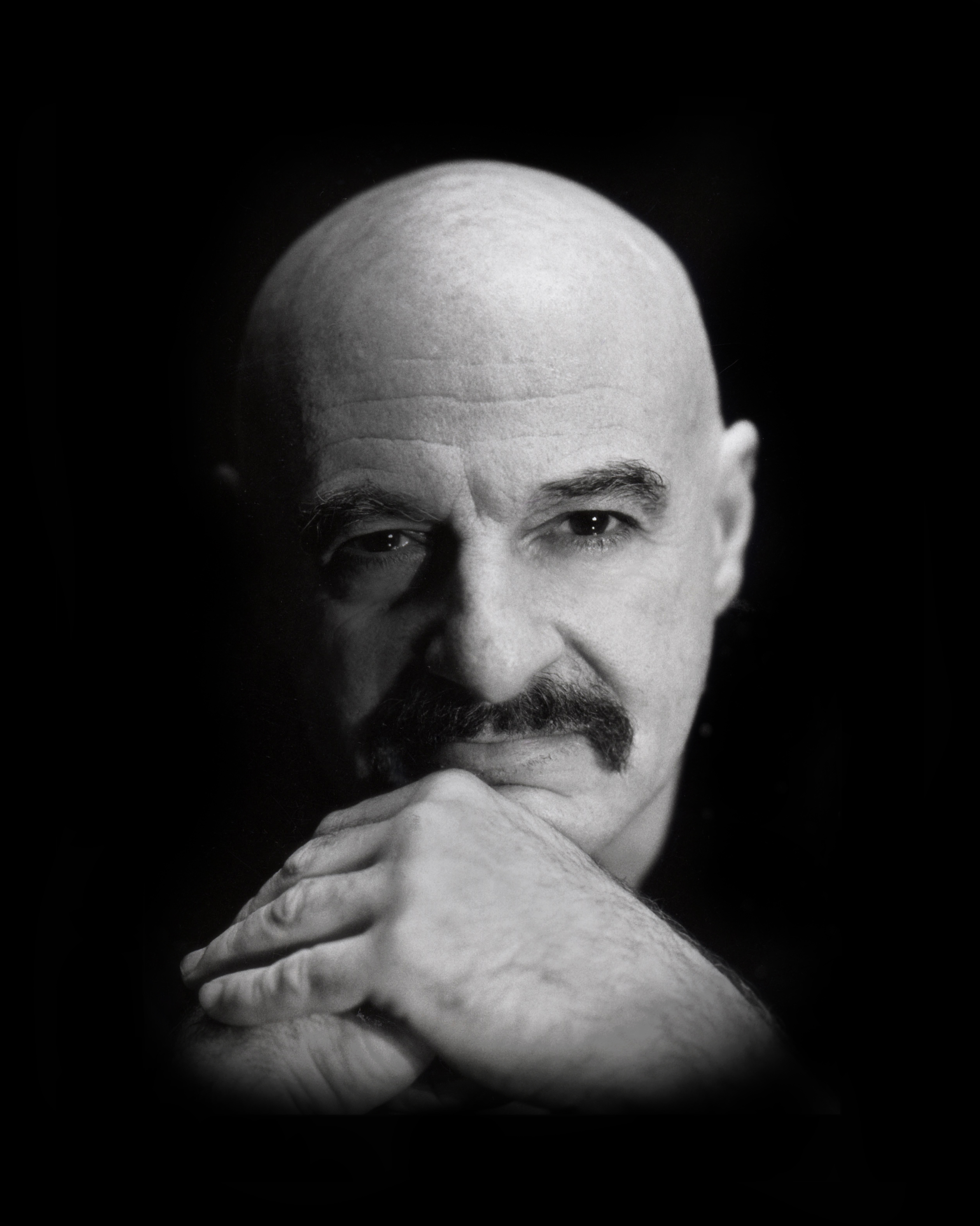
Lou Maletta created Men and Films, which debuted on Channel J in 1982.

=== Men and Films ===
Men and Films was created in 1982 by Lou Maletta, who later created the Gay Cable Network. On the show, Maletta interviewed gay porn stars and reviewed gay pornographic films, motivated in part to destigmatize gay sex. It aired at 11 P.M. on Thursdays.

=== Midnight Blue ===
Midnight Blue was produced by Al Goldstein, the publisher of Screw magazine. The show featured reviews of pornographic films, interviews with celebrities, and discussion of topics ranging from strippers to group sex. It ran from 1974 to 2003, later moving to Channel 35

=== The Robin Byrd Show ===
The Robin Byrd Show featured Robin Byrd interviewing other adult film stars. Like Interludes After Midnight, The Robin Byrd Show was later parodied on Saturday Night Live, with Cherie Oteri portraying Byrd. The show later moved to Channel 35

=== The Ugly George Hour of Truth, Sex, and Violence ===
The Ugly George Hour of Truth, Sex, and Violence, starring pornographer George Urban, ran from 1976 to 1982 (with sporadic reboots until 1991). Urban roamed the streets of New York urging women to take off their clothes on camera. He also interviewed celebrities (including John Lennon, Yoko Ono, and Michael Jackson) and interviewed politicians about the first amendment. He once recorded a segment inside the sex club Plato's Retreat.

== Controversy ==
Channel J's sex-positive programming was scandalized in mainstream discourse and subject to censorship efforts. The New York Times, for instance, reported in 1984 that late-night viewing on Channel J "has become identified with sex" owing to its depictions of "male frontal nudity," "clips from pornographic homosexual films," and other "explicit sexual" content. Morality in Media, an anti-pornography organization, called the shows "abominable."

At the time, state law prevented cable operators from restricting content, even sexually explicit content, except that which was considered obscene. In response to Channel J, the New York State Legislature passed a law in 1983 requiring cable companies to offer devices to block entire channels or programs that "viewers may find objectionable." According to Time magazine, only 19 such devices were ever installed.
