= Pillsbury Co. v. Milky Way Productions =

Court case about fair-use

Pillsbury Co. v. Milky Way Productions, US No. C78-679A (1981), is a precedent-setting case, decided on December 24, 1981, that established fair-use protections for publication of registered trademarks in sexually explicit parodies in the United States. Screw magazine, owned by Milky Way Productions, depicted a figure resembling the Pillsbury Dough Boy in various lewd sexual acts, including fellatio and sexual intercourse. The parody also featured Pillsbury's barrelhead trademark and two lines from the refrain of a two-stanza song entitled "The Pillsbury Baking Song." The picture was published in the February 20, 1978 issue of SCREW.

The Pillsbury Company filed an initial complaint several weeks after the original publication of the cartoon contending that the manner in which the magazine presented the picture implied that the plaintiff, Pillsbury, placed it in the magazine as an advertisement. The plaintiff alleged several counts of copyright infringement, federal statutory, common law trademark infringement, violations of the Georgia Uniform Deceptive Trade Practices Act and of the Georgia "anti-dilution" statute, and several counts of tortious tarnishment of its marks, trade characters, and jingle. The judge presiding in the case, William Clark O'Kelley, issued a temporary injunction against the defendant on April 21, 1978, which the defendant disobeyed.

In its final decision, the Atlanta Division of the United States District Court for the Northern District of Georgia held that the pictures were editorial or social commentary and, thus, protected under fair use. It's unclear whether the defendant would have prevailed under 2006's Trademark Dilution Revision Act.
