= Bernárd J. Lynch =

Irish Catholic priest and psychotherapist

The Reverend Dr. Bernárd J. Lynch
- Church: Catholic Church

Orders
- Ordination: 20 December 1971 by Eugene O'Doherty

Personal details
- Born: 1947 (age 78–79) Ennis, County Clare, Ireland
- Denomination: Catholicism
- Spouse: Billy Desmond (m. 2017)

Bernárd J. Lynch (born 1947) is an Irish Catholic priest and psychotherapist based in London, renowned for his human rights work with HIV/AIDS and with the LGBTQIA community. He is a former member of the Society of African Missions and was ordained in 1971.

Lynch is an "out" gay man. In 2006, he became the first Catholic priest in the world to have a civil partnership and married his husband in Ireland in 2017.

== Biography ==
Lynch attended the Christian Brothers' School in Ireland and began serving as an altar boy in the local Catholic church when only eight years old. In 1965, Lynch joined the Society of African Missions (SMA).

Lynch was ordained in Ireland in 1971. He has worked for the rights of LGBT people for more than forty years starting with his work in Dignity USA (New York Chapter), the LGBT Catholic group.

In 1982, Lynch founded the first AIDS ministry in New York City with Dignity USA (New York Chapter) as documented in the documentary films AIDS: A PRIEST’S TESTAMENT in 1987 and SOUL SURVIVOR in 1990. Lynch publicly campaigned in support of Mayor Ed Koch's Executive Order 50 in 1984, which compels City contractors not to discriminate on the basis of sexual orientation.

Lynch publicly testified in favour of New York City’s lesbian and gay rights bill that bans discrimination based on sexual orientation in jobs and public accommodations, seeing it through to passage by the New York City Council in 1986.

In 1988, Lynch was indicted for child sex abuse alleged to have occurred at Mount Saint Michael Academy in The Bronx in the mid 1980s. Lynch won total exoneration from Justice Burton Roberts in Bronx Supreme Court. As alleged in the documentary film A Priest on Trial, Lynch's support for LGBT rights brought down on him a false prosecution perpetrated by Church and government officials. He later moved to London and started a ministry for gay priests. He was expelled from the SMA order in 2012.

Lynch faced a civil lawsuit, filed in 2019, in New York for allegedly sexually abusing another teen student at Mount Saint Michael Academy 40 years ago. The 57-year-old plaintiff, 16 at the time of the alleged abuse, said it occurred in 1978 and 1979. In 2021, the lawsuit was dropped.

In November 2022, it was announced that the National Library of Ireland has acquired the personal papers from Lynch. The Fr Bernárd Lynch Collection represents the personal and public life of Lynch. Comprising letters, postcards, newspaper clippings, and legal testimonies, the archive spans more than 50 years.

== Personal life ==
In 2006, Lynch reportedly became the first Catholic priest in the world to have a civil partnership, after having his relationship officiated civilly in 1998. He civilly married his husband, Billy Desmond, in 2017 in County Clare, Ireland.

== Honors ==
Lynch was honoured with the Magnus Hirschfeld Award 1988 for outstanding service to the cause of Irish LGBT civil rights. In 2017, Lynch received a proclamation from the New York City Council honouring his more than 40 years of service to the LGBT and AIDS communities in the city. Lynch received Presidential Distinguished Service Awards for the Irish Abroad for 2019, in the Charitable Works category. The awards recognise the contribution of members of the Irish diaspora in the world. In 2023, Clare County Council hosted a Civic Reception acknowledging the remarkable influence exerted by Bernárd Lynch in his efforts in advocating for equal rights, particularly for the LGBTQIA+ community and individuals affected by HIV/AIDS. In January 2025, Lynch was given the Freedom of the City of London. In February 2026, Lynch was included in Attitude 101 2026, the annual list of influential figures across the global LGBTQ+ community.

== Publications ==
- Lynch, Bernard (1993). A Priest on Trial. London: Bloomsbury Pub Ltd. ISBN 0-7475-1036-9
- Lynch, Bernard (1995). "A Land Beyond Tears". In O'Carroll, Ide; Collins, Eoin (ed.). Lesbian and Gay Visions of Ireland: Towards the Twenty-first Century. London: Cassell. pp. 212–20. ISBN 0-304-33227-5
- Lynch, Bernard (1996). "Religious and Spirituality Conflicts". In Davies, Dominic; Neal, Charles (ed.). Pink Therapy: A Guide for Counsellors and Therapists Working with Lesbian, Gay and Bisexual Clients. Buckingham: Open University Press. pp. 199–207. ISBN 0-335-19145-2
- Lynch, Bernard (2003). "Love's Endeavour, Love Expense". In O'Brien, Glen (ed.). Coming Out: Irish Gay Experiences. Dublin: Currach Press. pp. 260–68. ISBN 1-85607-904-X
- Lynch, Bernard (2012). If It Wasn't Love, Sex Death & God. Winchester: Circle Books. ISBN 978-1-84694-918-0
- Lynch, Bernard (2022). "An Appreciation of the Life of my Dear Friend, Michael Kelly". In Brown, Andrew (ed.). Into Your Hands: Essays Inspired by Mystic, Prophet, and Activist Michael Bernard Kelly. Melbourne: Clouds of Magellan Press. pp. 125–128. ISBN 978-0-6453531-6-7

== Legacy ==
- AIDS: A Priest's Testament (1987, Director: Conor McAnally, A Strongbow/ Green Apple Production for Channel Four, UK)
- A Priest On Trial (1990, Director: Conor McAnally, A Green Apple Television Production for Channel Four, UK)
- Soul Survivor (1990, Director: Conor McAnally, A Green Apple Television Production for Channel Four, UK)
- Falsely Accused (2023, Producer / Programme Director: Padraic Flaherty, Clare FM). The documentary won Gold at 2023 New York Festivals Radio Awards.
