= Lou Maletta =

Media Executive and Activist

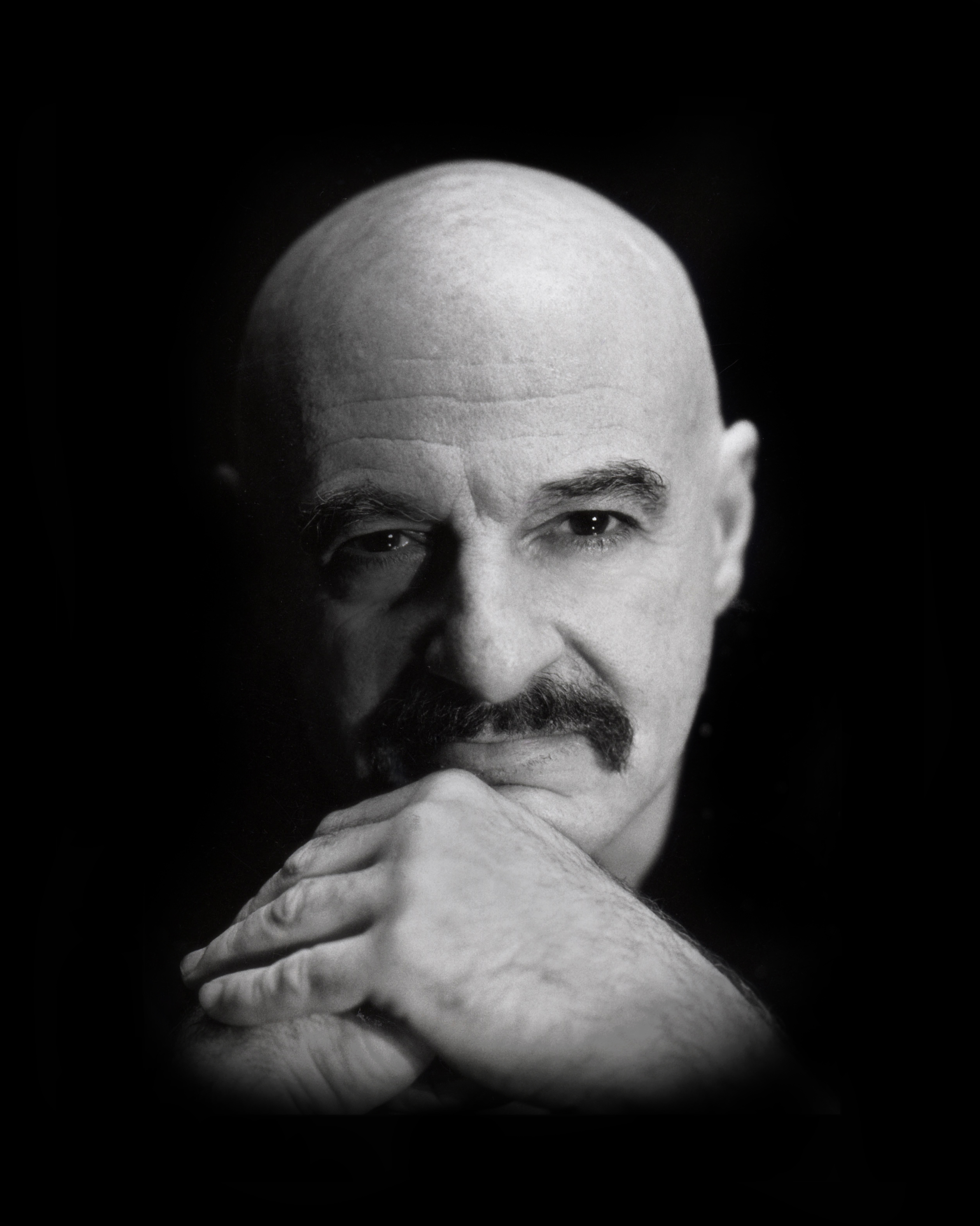
- Maletta in 1998
- Born: December 14, 1936; Brooklyn, New York, U.S.
- Died: November 2, 2011 (aged 74); Kingston, New York, U.S.
- Occupations: Media executive, LGBTQ activist

Louis Phillip "Lou" Maletta Jr. (December 14, 1936 – November 2, 2011) was an American media executive and LGBTQ rights activist. Maletta founded the Gay Cable Network in 1982.

== Life and career ==
Maletta was born in Brooklyn, New York and served in the United States Army. After his discharge, he worked as a freelance photographer and travel agent. Maletta married and had a daughter with his wife before divorcing and coming out as gay. He was with his partner Luke Valenti from 1974 until Maletta's death.

Maletta's start in media came with the show Men and Films on Manhattan Cable Television's Channel J, a show that evolved from showing edited gay pornography to covering events important in the community. He was inspired to start Gay Cable Network after seeing the effects AIDS had on a friend. The network went on to produce original programming, including coverage of Democratic National Conventions and Republican National Conventions between 1984 and 2000.

Andy Humm, then a GCN correspondent, recounted years afterward that Maletta's wearing of a "spandex, black leather jacket, the Gay Network T-shirt and a cowboy hat" at a backwoods Mississippi Hardee's while en route to the Republican National Convention caught the attention of other patrons, so much so that the place went "deadly silent. I didn’t think we’d get out alive, but perhaps the locals were just too shocked to react."

Gay Cable Network closed in 2001 upon Maletta's retirement. All 6,100 video tapes of GCN's archive were sold to the New York University's Fales Library for preservation in 2009.

Maletta was also the off-camera voice in a Calvin Klein campaign pulled in 1995 for racy content which some suggested had overtones of underage pornography. Maletta died of liver cancer in Kingston, New York.
