= Kęstutis Nakas =

American dramatist

Kestutis Nakas
- Born: 1953 (age 72–73)
- Education: Michigan State University (BA); New York University (MFA)
- Writing career
- Genre: playwright
- Notable work: 4 part farce When Lithuania Ruled the World

Kęstutis Nakas is an American playwright, author, performer, director, and teacher whose work has been presented at the New York Shakespeare Festival, Yale Repertory Theatre, La Mama, Dixon Place, P.S. 122, St. Mark's Church in the Bowery, 8 BC, The Kitchen, Highways, and numerous other national venues.

== Biography ==
Nakas was born in 1953 in the U.S. to Lithuanian emigrants. He was named after Kęstutis, a 14th-century monarch of Lithuania, a heritage which he describes as "...no joke. It's hard work. Like being an emotional verbose gesticulating Italian and a sullen depressed Scandinavian at the same time."

Nakas was active in New York's East Village performance scene and was artistic director of Gates of Dawn, which showcased cutting edge performers such as Holly Hughes. He has taught at New York University, University of California, Los Angeles, CUNY, and the University of New Mexico.

Nakas received his B.A. from Michigan State University's experimental Justin Morrill College and a M.F.A. from New York University.

His best-known piece is the 4-part historical comic farce When Lithuania Ruled the World. Parts I through III of the series combining Lithuanian history and mythology were produced in New York City in the 1980s and 1990s; Part IV was produced in Chicago in 2003.

According to The New York Times review of this play, "Mr. Nakas is a very clever subverter of all versions of history...Experiencing this dizzying spectacle is certainly different and quite exhilarating, perhaps like seeing all the operas of Wagner and Mussorgsky jammed together and staged in Grand Central Terminal at rush hour."

== Other works ==
Kestutis is the founder of a monthly live art performance event at i^3 productions I^3 hypermediain Chicago. Originally called "Word Of Mouth," and now "Follow Spot," this event is a "laboratory for original performance and live experiments of any nature." ()

- FOLLOW SPOT PASSING OF THE HAT CEREMONY at().
- Follow Spot on Facebook at ()
- Hunger and Lightning, play; New York Times review at().
- The Amazing Spear of Destiny, play; New York Times review at ().

== Professorship ==
Nakas is currently associate professor of theatre at The Theatre Conservatory of Chicago College of Performing Arts at Roosevelt University in Chicago.

== Family ==
He is married to the actress Audra Budrys and they have one child together. Kęstutis has two siblings, a brother, Al, and one younger sister, Ruta.

== Acting ==
As an actor, Nakas briefly appeared in the soap opera All My Children.
