= Gay Cable Network =

American cable television network

- Country: United States
- Broadcast area: New York
- Headquarters: New York City, New York, U.S.

Programming
- Language: English

History
- Launched: 1982
- Founder: Lou Maletta
- Closed: 2001

Gay Cable Network (GCN) was one of the first cable television networks which openly appealed to a gay and lesbian audience. It was established in 1982 in New York City by Lou Maletta, was broadcast on Manhattan Cable Television channel 35 and wound down operations circa 2000–2001. It initially broadcast a series titled Men and Films, which explored male erotica, and evolved to host a wider variety of content, including news and current affairs programs which covered political developments affecting the LGBTQ community and the HIV/AIDS epidemic. Throughout its time, GCN provided coverage of the Democratic and Republican National Conventions, with on-floor correspondents interviewing candidates and delegates, as well as coverage of the 1987 and 1993 LGBTQ rights marches on Washington. GCN also played music videos that highlighted LGBTQ artists, drag performances and LGBTQ allies. GCN not only played American LGBTQ artists but highlighted international artists and bands as well. A documentary that aired on GCN, Out in the 90's, earned the network a Special Recognition Award at the inaugural GLAAD Media Awards in 1990.

In 2009, New York University acquired from Maletta some 6,100 VHS tapes of GCN broadcasts from throughout its 19 years of operation for preservation.

== People ==
- George Bouzetos, hosted and co-created Pride and Progress and helmed coverage of the 1988, 1992 and 2000 party conventions, currently host of Gay USA with Ann Northrop.
- Kostis Chatzidakis (Selfed named as "The short one"), correspondent with GCN until his death in 1991. His brother Allen negotiated the preservation of GCN's archives with NYU.

== Programs ==
- Gay USA (1985 as Pride and Progress - present)
- Men in Films
- Be Our Guest
- In the Dungeon with "Slave Dale"
- Good Morning, Gaymerica!
- Men in Rims
- Inside/Out
- The Closet Case Show
- Lovie TV
- Men for Men
- Out! in the 90's
- Out on Wednesdays
- Dyke TV
- Party Talk
- Stonewall Place After Dark, a late-night talk show hosted by John Burke/Sybil Bruncheon, whose guests included singer Moi Renée
- Way Out!
- Music video block

== See also ==
- Channel J
- Here TV
- Logo
