= Mikhail Armalinsky =

American poet

Mikhail Izrailevich Armalinsky (né Peltsman; Russian: Михаил Израилевич Армалинский; born in Leningrad, Soviet Union) is a Russian poet, writer, blogger, and publisher of erotica. He caused scandal and outrage within Russian literary circles, following publication in 1986 of a pornographically toned diary, ostensibly by Alexander Pushkin. This led to him being described as "The Pushkin pornographer".

== Biography ==
On 23 April 1947, Armalinsky was born in Leningrad (now Saint Petersburg) in the Soviet Union, where he lived for the entirety of his early life. He received master's degree in Electrical Engineering from Leningrad Electro-Technical Institute (1964–1970) and actively participated in Leningrad literary underground. There, he published three samizdat books of poetry.

After emigrating to the US on 17 November 1976 and settling in Minneapolis, he worked as engineer in 1977 and started the machine building company Peltsman Corporation with his father, inventor Israel Peltsman, in 1979. At the same time Armalinsky kept working on his literary works and in 1984 started his own publishing house M.I.P. Company.

Armalinsky is of Russian-Jewish origins..

== Creative output ==
Armalinsky is the author of many books of poetry, prose, and essays (see § Selected publications).

In 1986, he published Secret Journal 1836–1837 by Alexander Pushkin in Russian and later in English as a translation. This book created a scandal in Russia and was published in 25 countries.

Excerpts from Secret Journal 1836–1837 were published in Penthouse Forum, February 1991, p. 50–53, 84, 86.

Response of Russian media to this book is documented in several editions of Parapushkinistika by David Bayevsky, published by Armalinsky's publishing house M.I.P. Company.

Banned in Russia, the Secret Journal was first published in 2001 by Moscow publishing house Ladomir that was threatened and prosecuted for publishing "pornographic blasphemy".

In 2006 Secret Journal was staged in Paris, France.

Some attributed the authorship of the Secret Journal to Armalinsky himself. Dr. Lee B. Croft wrote:

"The pornographic nature of those notes, clearly of a modern Western stripe, drew apoplectic reaction from the Soviet literary authorities who first encountered them. One legal authority, in a sidebar to an article on this "hoax" in Ogonek magazine, suggested that Armalinsky be castrated for so besmirching the hallowed name of Pushkin. ...his clear feeling of "kinship" with Pushkin and his choice of Pushkin's persona to gain attention for his own literary endeavors, which have, especially since his emigration to the United States in the early 1980s, taken on a pornographic character strikingly similar to the notes he attributes to Pushkin."

Since 1999, Mikhail Armalinsky publishes his blog in Russian named General Erotic (GE) where he publishes his short stories, observations, reviews and essays.

In 1989, a variation on the United States flag designed by Mikhail Armalinsky made the cover of New York weekly Screw.

== Selected publications ==
Russian

- Vrazumlenniye Strasty (Smart Passions), poems, Los Angeles; 1980, 72 p.
- Sostoyanie (The Status), poems, Sovremennik, Toronto, 1979, 94 p. No ISBN
- Mayatnik (The Pendulum), poems, Minneapolis, 1978, 128 p.
- Po napravleniyu k sebe (Towards Myself), poems, Los Angeles; 1980, 106 p.
- Posle proshlogo (After the Past), poems, Hermitage, Ann Arbor, 1982, 108 p.
- Muskulistaya smert (Muscular Death), short stories, Minneapolis, 1984, 150 p.
- Po obye storoni orgasma (On Both Sides of Orgasm), poems, Minneapolis, 1988, 150 p.
- Dobrovolniye Priznaniya – Vinuzhdenaya Perepiska (Voluntary Confessions – Forced Correspondence), novel, Minneapolis, 1991, 312 p.
- Dvoistveynnie Otnosheniya. Izlublennie Rasskazi (Ambivalent Relationships. Favorite Stories), Minneapolis, 1993, 68 p.
- Vplotnuyu (Close To), poems, Minneapolis, 1994, 100 p.
- Gonimoye Chudo (Expelled Miracle) Short stories, fairytale and essay, Minneapolis, 1996, 130 p.
- Zhizneopisaniye Mgnovenia (Biography of the Moment), Poems 1994 - 1997; Minneapolis, 1997, 92 p.
- Chtob znali! (So That Your Know!), Moscow, Ladomir, 2002, 860 p.
- Chto Mozhet Bit Luchshe? (What Can Be Better?), Moscow, Ladomir, 2012, 528 p.
- Aromat Griaznogo Belia. Zamislovatiye Biografii (The Scent of Dirty Laundry. Complicated Biographies) Moscow, Ladomir, 2013, 584 p.
- Maximalizmi. (Maximalizms) Moscow, Ladomir, 2013, 544 p.
- Pravota Zhelanii (Rightness of Desires), Moscow, Ladomir, 2017, 512 p.

Edited

- Soitiye. Almanak Russkoi Eroticheskoi Literaturi (Copulation. The Almanac of Russian Erotic Literature), Minneapolis, 1989, 184 p.
- Russkie Bestizhie Poslovitsi i Pogovorki (Russian Shameless Proverbs and Sayings), Minneapolis, 1995, 76 p.
- Detskii Eroticheski Folklor. (Children's Erotic Folklore), Minneapolis, 1995, 91 p.

Translations

- Markiz de Sad Filosofia v Buduare (Marquis de Sade. Philosophy in the Bedroom) Minneapolis, 1993, 196 p.

English

- The Deal, Short story, "Confrontation" Exile and the Writer, a literary journal of Long Island University Nos. 27–28, 1984
- Hero, Short story, Mid-American Review, a literary journal of Bowling Green State University, Volume VI, Number 2, 1986
- Nothing in Mail Short Story in “Bodies,” issue of Two Lines, A Journal of Translation, issue XII, San Francisco, 2005 p. 52–73
- Prostitution Divine. Short stories, movie script and essay (Kindle ebook), Minneapolis, 2014, 246 p.

== Other sources ==
Scholarly presentations in the US on Mikhail Armalinsky

- "Russia Fails at Pushkin: Mikhail Armalinsky’s Publication of Pushkin A .S. Secret Notes 1836-1837" by Jasmina Savic, University of Illinois, on 19 November 2016, at the ASEEES (Association for Slavic, East European and Eurasian Studies) Annual Convention.
- "Into the Bright Future: Mikhail Armalinsky’s Literary Revolution and Poetics of Porn" by Jasmina Savic, on 28 October 2016, at the University of Illinois, Noontime Scholar Lecture.
- "On The Battlefield of Porn: Mikhail Armalinsky’s publication of Pushkin A .S. Secret Notes 1836–1837" by Jasmina Savic, University of Illinois, on 23 October 2015, at Central Slavic Conference, Saint Louis University, St. Louis, Missouri
- "Seeking Mikhail Armalinsky: Constructing and Reading the Self in an Age of Digital Revolution" by Emily D. Johnson, University of Oklahoma, on 21 November 2013, at the Annual Convention of the Association for Slavic, East European, and Eurasian Studies (ASEEES) in Boston MA.
- Tatiana Shemetova PUSHKIN – «DON JUAN» IN THE INTERPRETATION OF P. HUBER AND M. ARMALINSKIY

see ANUARI DE FILOLOGIA. LLENGÜES I LITERATURES MODERNES (Anu.Filol.Lleng.Lit.Mod.) 9/2019, pp. 53–57, ISSN: 2014-1394

- Ph.D. Dissertation by Jasmina Savic (2019) Porno Ludens: Soviet literary pornography, 1970s – 1990s
