= Gene Stavis =

Film archivist

- Born: April 29, 1943; Boston, Massachusetts
- Died: December 30, 2013 (aged 70); New York City, US
- Other name: Eugene Benumen Stavis
- Occupation: Professor
- Known for: Film preservation, film archiving, film history, cinephilia, queer cinema

Eugene Benumen Stavis (29 April 1943 – 30 December 2013) was an American film archivist, cinephile and gay film pioneer. He was the producer of The Emerald City, the first gay-themed cable television show in New York, and a storied professor of film at the School of Visual Arts, which named a theater in his honor.

== Early life ==
Gene Stavis was born in Boston to Samuel Stavis and Sylvia Citron. The family relocated to Brookline, Massachusetts after the birth of their son Hillel Stavis and daughter Laurel Stavis.

Stavis attended Brookline High School and then Boston University. He founded the BU Film Society in the early 1960s.

== American cinematheque ==
During the 1970s, Henri Langlois made an effort to establish an American counterpoint to the Cinémathèque française, which he had established with Georges Franju and Jean Mitry. Stavis became Langlois's American counterpart for the venture, and served as its New York director. The building that was to house the American Cinematheque was conceptualized by the I. M. Pei, but the project never came to fruition due to lack of funding.

Stavis was in charge of the development and opening of the Visual Arts Theater on 23rd Street in Manhattan, which opened in 2008.

== Emerald City ==
In the mid-1970s, Stavis, along with Frank Dowd and Steve Bie, formed Truth, Justice, and the American Way, Inc., a company which produced the community-access cable television program The Emerald City. It was the first gay-themed cable television show in New York. It focused primarily on issues in the gay community, and aired on Channel J. The program was later syndicated in San Francisco.

== Teaching ==
Stavis taught cinema studies and film history at City University, John Jay College, LaGuardia College, the New School and Fordham before being appointed as the film history professor at the School of Visual Arts in New York City in 1981, where he instructed for 30 years. He was appointed to be the instructor for the freshman year film history class, hosting every incoming film student for weekly screenings of classics from the silent and early talkie eras of cinema.

Notable directors who studied under Stavis include Michael Cuesta, Craig Gillespie, Robert Kolodny, Morten Tyldum, and Ti West.

== Personal life ==
Stavis often hosted private, invite-only screenings for young cinefiles and industry aficionados at his Waterside Plaza apartment. He would project rare 16mm or 35mm prints. He kept a large-format, framed image of Henri Langlois in his living room. He was rumored to have discovered a lost student film by Orson Welles, titled The Hearts of Age.

Stavis died in New York City on December 30, 2013.
