= Midnight Blue (TV series) =

- Created by: Al Goldstein
- Starring: Al Goldstein
- Country of origin: United States

Original release
- Network: Channel J
- Release: 1974 – 2003

Midnight Blue is a sexually themed cable television program that aired on Manhattan Cable Television Channel J in New York City.

Al Goldstein, the founder of Screw magazine, started broadcasting Midnight Blue on public-access television in Manhattan in 1974, originally calling the program Screw Magazine of the Air. The show featured interviews with porn stars, topless women, and advertisements for escorts and phone sex services.

Midnight Blue was the subject of controversy when Goldstein testified before a United States District Court in 1995 as part of a lawsuit brought against Time Warner Cable's plan to scramble sexually explicit public access programs unless subscribers gave written consent for them. The Supreme Court ultimately ruled in Goldstein's favor in 2000.

Goldstein was the host and producer along with radio personality Alex Bennett. Bennett and Screw editor Bruce David were its creators and original producers.

Seven collections of show excerpts have been released on DVD by Blue Underground, together with added material about the actresses and scenes from their movies.
