= Ann Northrop =

American journalist and activist

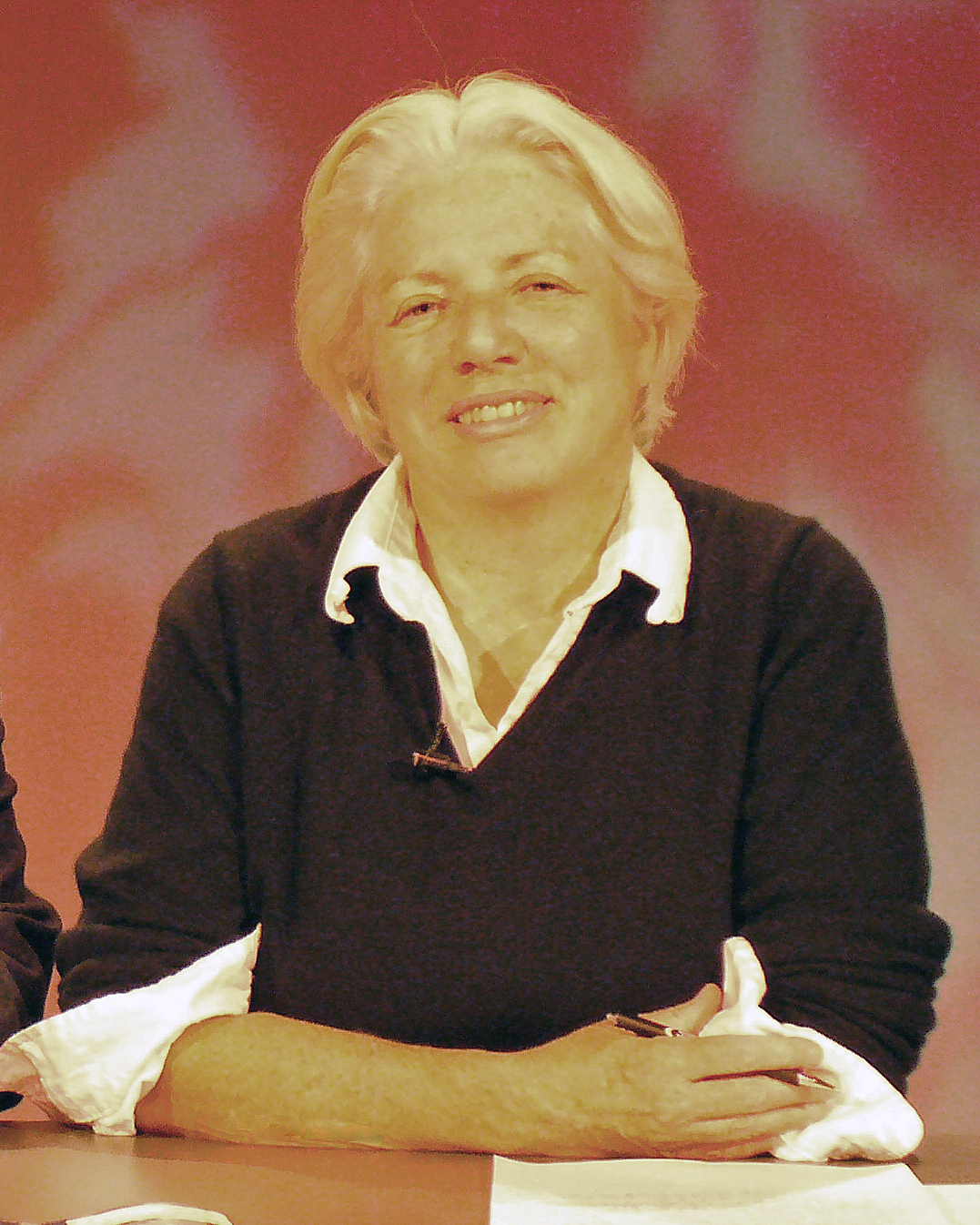
- Photo of Ann Northrop
- Born: 1948 (age 77–78); Hartford, Connecticut, U.S.
- Occupations: Journalist, television host

Ann Northrop (born 1948 in Hartford, Connecticut) is a journalist and activist, and the current co-host of TV news program Gay USA.

== Early life ==
Born in Hartford, Connecticut, Northrop is a native of her mother's hometown, Windsor. Northrop's father was an executive for United Airlines, and the family moved frequently, thus she spent most of her youth in the areas surrounding Hartford, Washington, D.C., Boston, Denver and Chicago. Northrop describes her childhood home as being "very Republican."

When Northrop left home to attend college in 1966, she considered herself to have been indoctrinated into a conservative viewpoint. College proved transformative for Northrop who said, "I’m one of those very dangerous converts – someone who discovered a radical, leftist point of view in my late teens and sort of traveled that road, ideologically, since." Northrop graduated from Vassar College in 1970, where she was instrumental in getting Gloria Steinem to be graduation speaker, during which Steinem quoted Black Panther Party co-founder Huey Newton.

The time Northrop spent studying at Vassar was where she found herself becoming exponentially involved with the political side of things by the late 1960s and early 1970s. She had partook in marches and protests regarding feminism and antiwar, which were conventional forms of activism as Northrop later characterized them. Her time spent playing field hockey influenced her desire to indulge in the world of activism, as she compared the environmental energy of collective protests to that of being a part of a team and participating habitually.

During the college years for Northrop, not only did she develop a knack for politics, her initial views had begun to change substantially. When she had initially been welcomed to Vassar in 1966, she possessed a political outlook that she deemed conservative but found herself becoming more and more influenced by all the political movements that took form and thus encountered at her college. The experiences Northrop had gone through during college as she navigated her way through that chapter of her life became a pivotal part of how she described the development surrounding her political view and her ensuing involvement in activism for antiwar and feminism.

== Career ==
After college, Northrop worked for the National Journal in Washington, D.C. She reported on all branches of the federal government which included The White House, Congress and the Supreme Court. After a year and a half, Northrop moved to New York City where she worked for WCBS-TV on a program called Woman.

After Woman ended, Northrop worked in WCBS-TV operations, was a freelance production assistant for ABC Sports, wrote for a nationally syndicated newspaper column as well as Ms. and other publications such as Ladies' Home Journal. Northrop acted as the New York officer for a study of thousands of straight and gay couples by Drs. Pepper Schwartz and Philip Blumstein titled "American Couples: Money-Work-Sex".

Northrop returned to regular television production in 1981 as a writer-producer for ABC's Good Morning America. She was then recruited by George Merlis to CBS News in 1982. For five years, Northrop was a producer for the CBS Morning News, planning, coordinating and executing the program on a daily basis. She worked with the show's hosts, including Diane Sawyer, Bill Kurtis, Forrest Sawyer, Maria Shriver, Phyllis George, Charlie Rose and Meredith Vieira.

In 1987, Northrop resigned her position at CBS, seeking a change. She chose to become an AIDS and homosexuality educator for New York City's Hetrick-Martin Institute for Lesbian and Gay Youth, working for them for four years.

In 1992, Northrop was the only openly lesbian or gay individual in the New York delegation to the Democratic National Convention. She was a board member of the Gay Games for four years. She serves on the board of advisors for the Institute for Gay and Lesbian Strategic Studies, a gay think tank which she helped found. Northrop also helped found the Lesbian and Gay Alumnae Association of Vassar College.

Northrop was a columnist for QW, a short-lived New York City gay magazine, and for LGNY, a NYC gay newspaper, from 1994 until 1998. Northrop was also regularly featured on Dyke TV, a nationally broadcast television program devoted to news, arts and culture from a lesbian perspective, in a political commentary section called Ann Northrop Mouths Off, first appearing on the show in June 1993.

In 1996, Northrop became a co-host of the television news program Gay USA. She and fellow anchor Andy Humm present news "...devoted to in-depth coverage of gay, lesbian, bisexual, and transgender issues" on a local, national and international level.

== Activism ==
Northrop was a demonstrator against the Vietnam War and became involved with the developing feminist movement during the late 1960s and early 1970s.

When Northrop became an AIDS and homosexuality educator, she "...realized the issues were the same that had engaged her as an activist against the Vietnam War and for the feminist movement". In February 1988, Northrop joined the AIDS Coalition to Unleash Power in New York City, known as ACT UP/New York. She was arrested approximately two dozen times for civil disobedience while participating in the group's direct action demonstrations.

In December 1989, Northrop participated in ACT UP's "Stop the Church" protest at St. Patrick's Cathedral in New York City by lying in the center aisle. During the action, over 4,500 activists interrupted Sunday Mass to protest the Catholic Church's opposition to AIDS prevention such as condom distribution and sex education. The documentary film How to Survive a Plague shows part of this action. She, along with 110 other protestors, was arrested. Northrop was later convicted on four misdemeanor charges. She described being in the cathedral on the LGBTQ&A podcast and said, "I happened to be the last person carried out, and by that time, everything had calmed down and was silent. So I started saying — and it was ringing through the cathedral — 'We're fighting for your lives, too. We're fighting for your lives, too,' which I hoped would be effective. Maybe, maybe not...I like to say I got home to watch the second half of the Giants/Broncos game."

Northrop also trained fellow activists on how to interact with news media and reporters.

=== Media Strategy ===
Alongside renowned journalist Michelangelo Signorile, Northrop was deemed a primary media strategist within ACT UP/New York by many fellow members and scholars. The background Northrop came from, which included five years working with the CBS Morning News as a network news producer, gave way for her prominent ability to anticipate the ways mainstream outlets would frame the organization's demonstrations, as cited by historians of ACT UP.

In the eyes of Northrop, the approach that ACT UP took to engage with outside institutions was stated as sequential due to the fact that the organization would typically first conduct a more direct negotiation with appropriate officials before the possibility of public demonstration.

Scholars identified this two-track approach as a key aspect of the broader organizational strategy of ACT UP, which would utilize both outside pressure and insider communication and combine them.

Northrop would regularly lead general meetings for ACT UP, which served as a primary venue for coordinating demonstration planning and message development. An archival initiative documenting ACT UP's operations through interviews with its members, also known as the ACT UP Oral History Project, displayed how her position, which was being both a journalist and an active participant, put herself into a new role as well. She began to oversee and advise certain actions of others in ACT UP's organization that would most likely be discussed by mainstream print media and television before these actions would be executed.

== Personal life ==
Northrop came out as a lesbian when she was about 28, working for Ms. magazine, and met a woman she fell in love with, Lynda. Northrop and Lynda were together for 17 years, and raised Lynda's two children from a previous marriage.
