= Theatre Conservatory (Chicago College of Performing Arts) =

Coordinates: 41°52′34″N 87°37′29″W

The Theatre Conservatory is a theater school at the Chicago College of Performing Arts at Roosevelt University in Chicago, Illinois, United States.

The school offers Bachelor of Fine Arts degrees in acting, Musical Theatre, and Musical Theatre Dance Emphasis as well as a Masters of Fine Arts in Directing offered during the summer. The conservatory currently holds classes and productions out of two theatres, the O'Malley Theatre and the Miller Studio Theatre. Both of which can be found on the Roosevelt University campus.

== Past and current productions ==
- Waiting for Lefty
- An Unkindness of Ravens (2007)
- Starting Here, Starting Now (2007)
- God's Country (2008)
- Peer Gynt (2008)
- The Wild Party (2008)
- Henry V (2008)
- The Furies (2008)
- Urinetown (2008)
- Ah, Wilderness (2009)
- Scapino (2009)
- Bells Are Ringing (2009)
- Pericles, Prince of Tyre (2009)
- Bury the Dead (2009)
- Jacques Brel is Alive and Well and Living in Paris (2009)
- Not About Nightingales (2010)
- A Flea in Her Ear (2010)
- Sweet Charity (2010)
- The Complete Works of William Shakespeare (Abridged) (2010)
- Execution of Justice (2010)
- Sweeney Todd (2010)
- Eurydice (2011)
- Spring Awakening- a play (2011)
- Best Little Whorehouse in Texas (2011)
- The Cradle Will Rock (2011)
- Our Town (2011)
- Rent (2011)
- The Life and Times of Tulsa Lovechild (2012)
- A Streetcar Named Desire (2012)
- How to Succeed in Business Without Really Trying (2012)
- The Tempest (2012)
- Rosencrantz and Guildenstern are Dead (2012)
- Lysistrata Jones (2012)
- Almost Maine (2013)
- The Grapes of Wrath (2013)
- Spring Awakening (2013)
- The Comedy of Errors (2013)
- Arms and the Man (2013)
- Cloud 9 (2013)
- Thoroughly Modern Millie (2014)
- As You Like It (2014)
- You Can't Take it With You (2014)
- Assassins (2014)
- A Funny Thing Happened on the Way to the Forum (2015)
- Picnic (2015)
- The Wild Party (2015)
- The Beaux' Stratagem (2015)
- The Plough and the Stars (2015)
- Henry V (2015)
- Hair (2015)
- The 39 Steps (2016)
- Legally Blonde (2016)
- The Baker's Wife (2016)
- A Midsummer Night's Dream (2016)
- Promises, Promises (2016)
- Godspell (2016)
- Cabaret (2017)
- Dogfight (2017)
- Angels in America: Part 1 (2017)
- Sunday in the Park with George (2017)
- The Seagull (2017)
- The Threepenny Opera (2017)
- A Touch Unnatural (2017)
- Goodnight Desdemona, Goodmorning Juliet (2017)
- The Man Who Came to Dinner (2017)
- Summer and Smoke (2018)
- Heddas (2018)
- Urinetown (2018)
- Pirates of Penzance (2018)
- Into The Woods (2025)
- Three Sisters (2025)
- Jesus Christ Superstar(2025)
- Urinetown (2025)
- The Misanthrope (2025)

== Notable alumni ==
- Tony Alcantar: American actor.
- Merle Dandridge:
  - Television: Greenleaf, Sons of Anarchy, The Night Shift
  - Broadway: Once on This Island (2017 Revival), Tarzan, Spamalot, Jesus Christ Superstar, Aida, Rent
- James Romney:
  - Broadway: Harry Potter and the Cursed Child
- Courtney Reed:
  - Broadway: ALADDIN
- Damon Gillespie:
  - Television: Rise, Inside Amy Schumer
  - Broadway: ALADDIN, NEWSIES
- Major Attaway:
  - Broadway: ALADDIN
- J. Michael Finley:
  - Film: I Can Only Imagine
  - Broadway: Les Miserables, The Book of Mormon
  - West End (London, UK): The Book of Mormon
- Angela Grovey:
  - National Tour: NEWSIES
- Parvesh Cheena: Los Angeles Actor.
- Barbara Zahora
- Shane Kenyon:
  - Film: Jessica, Olympia
  - Television: Chicago P.D., The Chicago Code
- Patrick Rooney
- Kyle Branzel

== Notable faculty ==
- Joel Fink
- Ray Frewen: Associate Dean of Theatre Conservatory
  - Television: Prison Break, Chicago Fire, Crime Story
  - Off-Broadway: The Foreigner
  - National Tour: Les Miserables
- Jane Lanier: Head of Musical Theatre Dance Emphasis Major
  - Television: Glee
  - Broadway: Sweet Charity (Revival), Jerome Robbins Broadway, Fosse: the Musical
- Dan Cooney: Head of Musical Theatre Major
  - Television: The Americans, The Following, Elementary (TV series), Kevin Can Wait
  - Broadway: Mamma Mia!, Bonnie and Clyde, 9 to 5, Les Misérables
  - Off-Broadway: Heathers the Musical
- Kestutis Nakas
  - Television: All My Children
- Kendall Kelley
- Nadine Gomes: Voice Faculty
- Rebecca Schorsch: Voice Faculty
- Michael Lasswell: Set Designer
- Steve Kruse: Master Carpenter
- Julie Mack: Resident Lighting Designer
- Daniel Drake
- Tim Stadler
- Caroline Brady Riley: Adjunct Voice Faculty
- Nancy Hess: Professor of Dance
  - Film: Center Stage, Smile
  - Broadway: Jerome Robbins Broadway, Chicago the Musical, Phantom of the Opera
- Tammy Mader: Professor of Dance
- Sarah Schafer: Professor of Dance
- Shane Kenyon: Adjunct Professor of Acting
  - Film: Jessica, Olympia
  - Television: Chicago P.D., The Chicago Code
- Barbara Zahora: Professor of Acting
