= Andy Humm =

Journalist and Activist

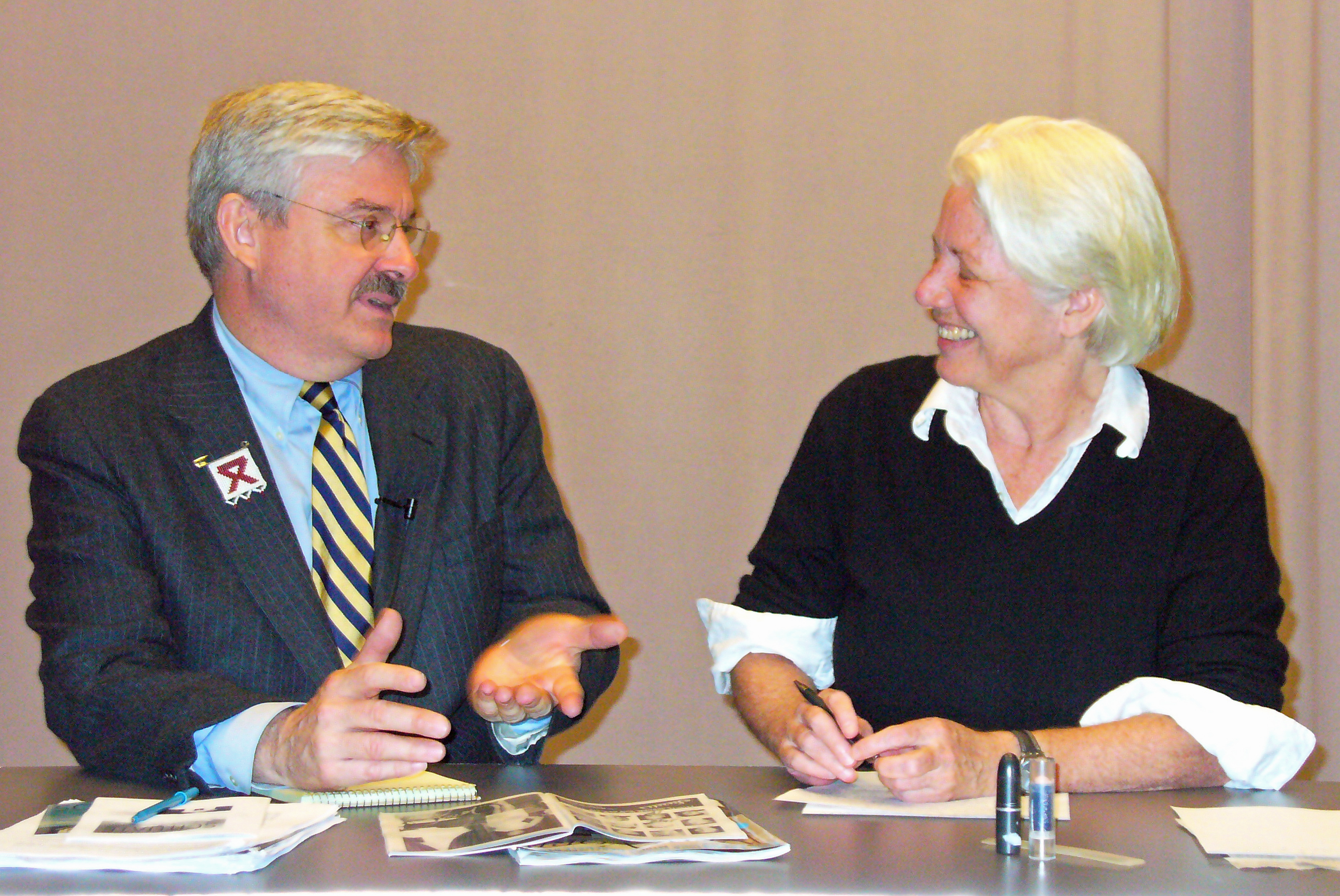
- Andy Humm and Ann Northrop by David Shankbone
- Born: October 19, 1953 (age 72); United States
- Occupations: Journalist, activist, television host

Andy Humm (born October 19, 1953) is a journalist, activist and currently co-host of TV news program Gay USA.

== Career ==
As a gay news reporter, Humm has covered virtually every major gay and AIDS news story since the 1980s. Humm began writing regularly for the gay press in the 1970s and 1980s when he worked for New York City News.

Humm began hosting gay news programs with Pride and Progress, aired on the Gay Cable Network (GCN), in 1985. He co-anchored GCN's nightly coverage of the 1988 Democratic and Republican National Conventions. Humm also did floor coverage of the 1992 Democratic National Convention. From 1986 to 1995, Humm was Director of Education at the Hetrick-Martin Institute for Lesbian and Gay Youth.

Following Pride and Progress, Humm became the host of Gay USA. In 1996, he began co-hosting the show with veteran journalist and activist Ann Northrop.

In 2000, Humm provided floor coverage of the Republican National Convention.

Humm has interviewed numerous people from both the public and private sectors. Politicians interviewed by Humm, titled according to their political position at the time of the interview, include Governors Bill Clinton and George Pataki; Senators Bill Bradley, Joseph Lieberman, Chuck Schumer, and Bob Dole; Representatives Newt Gingrich, Dick Cheney, and Richard Gephardt. Activists interviewed by Humm include Jesse Jackson, Gloria Steinem, Al Sharpton, and Larry Kramer. Humm has interviewed actors Matthew Broderick and Ian McKellen as well as authors Alan Hollinghurst, Ned Rorem, and Martin Duberman.

Humm has been interviewed on the CBS Evening News, the Geraldo Show, Charlie Rose, Fox TVs Hannity & Colmes, America's Talking with Chris Matthews, The Maury Povich Show, the Alan Colmes and Barry Farber radio shows, all New York City TV newscasts, and is a frequent guest on NY-1 TVs Inside City Hall. Humm's opinion-editorials have appeared in The New York Times, New York Post, Daily News and Newsday.

== Activism ==
Humm became President of the Gay Student Union at the University of Virginia in 1974, marking the beginning of his activism. From 1977 to 1991, Humm served as a spokesperson for the Coalition for Lesbian and Gay Rights which helped guide New York City's LGBT rights law through the City Council. He was a New York City Human Rights Commissioner from 1991 to 1993.

Humm's work in the HIV/AIDS and LGBTQ communities has been honored by the Human Rights Campaign, New York University, the AIDS and Adolescents Network, Advocates for Youth, the Parents and Friends of Lesbians and Gays, the Cincinnati Gay and Lesbian Coalition, the Office of the Public Advocate, the Bar Association for Human Rights of Greater New York, and the Arkansas Lesbian and Gay Task Force. In 1990, Humm was named an Arkansas Traveler by then-Governor Bill Clinton.

== See also ==
- Gay USA
