= John Paul Hudson =

American activist, writer & actor

- Born: March 21, 1929
- Died: February 18, 2002 (aged 72); Honesdale, Pennsylvania, U.S.
- Occupations: Gay activist; writer; actor

John Paul Hudson (March 21, 1929 – February 18, 2002) was an American gay activist, writer, and actor. He was one of the organizers of the first gay pride march in New York City and is recognized as one of the first gay activists and preservers of American gay history. He was also known by the pseudonym John Francis Hunter, a name under which Hudson wrote early gay travel guides for the United States.

== Early life ==
John Paul Hudson was born on March 21, 1929. As a young man, he chose to change his name to John Paul Hudson. His close family and friends called him "Jack".

== Career ==
=== Writing ===
As a journalist, Hudson was a longtime employee of Time Inc. and WarnerMedia. Hudson also freelanced, contributing to The Advocate, Gay, Gay News, Gaysweek, David, NewsWest, Flash, and Vector.

For his early literary works, he wrote under the pseudonym John Francis Hunter. Those early works were self-published and chronicled a largely promiscuous gay lifestyle of the early 1970s, providing travel guides to the New York and American gay scene. In spite of this apparent celebration of promiscuity, John Paul advocated total celibacy as being the responsible behavior required by the times during the AIDS crisis of the following decade. These books are credited as being among the first gay travel guides in the United States.

He co-wrote the novel SUPERSTAR MURDER: A Prose Flick. with Warren Wexler in 1976. This novel/screenplay was a murder-mystery romp based on the premise of a Bette Midler-styled drag queen being murdered at a bathhouse modeled after the Continental Baths in New York. The role of protagonist "Guido" was purportedly written to be played by David Cassidy.

Hudson was also a lyricist. He wrote "Love Is", based on the 13th chapter of St. Paul's "First Letter to the Corinthians".

=== Acting ===
As an actor, producer, and director, he was a member of the Screen Actors Guild, and was active in off-Broadway theater, television and film. In 1972, Hudson played “Smiley” in Robert Downey, Sr.'s comedy-western movie Greaser's Palace. Hudson appeared on New York's The Emerald City gay television talk show on July 1, 1978, along with Grace Jones.

=== Activism ===
On April 28, 1970, Hudson declared himself "awakening as a born-again radical." He celebrated his birthday annually on this day, in celebration of his activism.

John Paul Hudson was the librarian and archivist for the New York Chapter of the Mattachine Society. He was also a member of the Gay Activists Alliance and vice president of the National Coalition of Gay Activists. He later served as a co-Master-of-Ceremonies of the Pride Rally in Central Park in 1976, along with activist Karla Jay.

== Later life and legacy ==
Hudson was a Christian Scientist. He died February 18, 2002, in a retirement community in Honesdale, Pennsylvania.

Hudson's personal papers are held in the collection of the ONE National Gay and Lesbian Archives.

== Works by John Paul Hudson ==
- The gay insider : a hunter's guide to New York and a thesaurus of phallic lore. New York : The Traveller's Companion, Inc. (1971).
- The gay insider, USA. New York: Stonewall Publishing (1972).
- with Warren Wexler. SUPERSTAR MURDER. A Prose Flick. New York: Insider Press (1976).
- The Lost Commandment: How to Be Gay in the 21st Century. Self-published (2002). ISBN 1401030297
