= Jan Wallman =

American night club owner and producer

Jan Wallman (May 14, 1922 – October 8, 2015) was an American night club owner and producer.

== Life ==
She was born in Roundup, Montana. She studied at University of Minnesota. She managed the night club Upstairs-at-the-Duplex where notable performers like Barbra Streisand, Joan Rivers, and Woody Allen began their careers.

In 1986, a celebration was held in her honor at Carnegie Hall.
