= Coalition for Lesbian and Gay Rights =

The Coalition for Lesbian and Gay Rights was an umbrella organization based in New York City active from 1977 to 1994. It provided services to lesbian and gay groups trying to end discrimination based on sexual preference.
