= Hal Call =

American journalist

- Born: Harold Leland Call; September 20, 1917; Trenton, Missouri, US
- Died: December 18, 2000 (aged 83); San Francisco, California, US
- Education: University of Missouri
- Occupations: Businessperson, LGBT rights activist
- Known for: President of Mattachine Society
- Military career
- Allegiance: United States
- Branch: United States Army
- Service years: 1941–1945
- Rank: Captain
- Conflicts: Pacific War
- Awards: Purple Heart

Harold Leland "Hal" Call (September 20, 1917 – December 18, 2000) was an American businessperson, LGBT rights activist, and U.S. Army veteran. He served as president of the Mattachine Society. In the 1950s, he was one of the first gay activists to speak publicly on television. Call founded printing presses for LGBT publications and later opened gay adult shops and pornographic film screening venues. He received a Purple Heart for his service in the Pacific War.

== Early life and education ==
Born and raised in Grundy County, Missouri, Call enrolled in the University of Missouri in 1935 on a scholarship. He studied journalism. Call enlisted in the United States Army in June 1941 as a private. He was promoted to sergeant within the year and, after completing Officer Candidate School, was promoted to lieutenant. He saw combat in the Pacific War, where he was wounded and received the Purple Heart. Returning to the United States in 1945, Call left the army at the rank of captain and returned to the University of Missouri to complete his journalism degree.

== Career and activism ==
After graduating, Call worked for several news outlets, including the Kansas City Star. In August 1952, while working for the Star, Call was arrested for "lewd conduct" and paid an $800 bribe to have the charges dismissed. Call resigned his job, and he and his lover Jack moved to San Francisco.

With his arrival in the city, Call became involved with the Mattachine Society, the first sustained gay rights group in the United States. Following the resignations of the original leadership in 1953, Call became president of the Society. Call frequently appeared on local television programs in the 1950s as one of the few openly gay men who spoke about gay issues, and appeared both in The Rejected, the first-ever television documentary on homosexuality, and "CBS Reports: The Homosexuals", the first network broadcast on the subject.

In 1955, Call co-founded Pan Graphic Press, which printed The Mattachine Review, The Ladder and other homophile publications. During his time there, The Mattachine Review reached its historic peak of circulation in 1960, with 3,000 copies sold that year. He also founded Dorian Book Service, a gay and lesbian literature clearinghouse.

The June 1964 Paul Welch Life article entitled "Homosexuality In America" was the first time a national publication reported on gay issues; Life's photographer was referred to the gay leather bar in San Francisco called the Tool Box for the article by Call, who had long worked to dispel the myth that all homosexual men were effeminate. The article opened with a two-page spread of the mural of life size leathermen in the bar, which had been painted by Chuck Arnett in 1962. The article described San Francisco as "The Gay Capital of America" and inspired many gay leathermen to move there.

With the liberalization of US obscenity laws beginning in the late 1950s and early 1960s, Call began marketing gay erotica in 1967 through the Adonis Bookstore, the first gay adult shop in the United States. The next year he established Grand Prix Photo Arts, a film and photograph production business with a focus on erotic works. In 1973, he added the Cinemattachine theater (associated with Mattachine Society, Inc. and the Seven Committee) as a back room to Adonis.

He expanded the business to include peep shows, also adding the Rooster Room for chicken films which was later renamed to the Circle J club (which had no references to Mattachine) in the 1980s. Call also began filming pornographic "loops" of men masturbating on a gold couch in his office. These Gold Couch Capers became collector's items.

== Death and legacy ==
Call died of congestive heart failure in San Francisco on December 18, 2000, at the age of 83. He was survived by three brothers who did not approve of him. They visited Call a few months before his death to say goodbye. At Call's request, he was cremated and did not have a funeral.

Circle J continued as a venue for screening pornographic films and hosting "circle jerk" parties until 2005.

Season 2, episode 3 of the podcast Making Gay History is about Call, and features an interview between Call and Eric Marcus.
