= List of pre–Stonewall riots American television episodes with LGBTQ themes =

Most American television episodes with LGBTQ themes that aired before the 1969 Stonewall riots were on various local talk shows. Generally, these shows would gravely discuss the "problem" of homosexuality with a panel of "experts" on the subject, none of whom were identified as homosexual. These included such programs as Confidential File out of Los Angeles, which produced "Homosexuals and the Problems They Present" in 1954 and "Homosexuals Who Stalk and Molest Our Children" in 1955, and The Open Mind out of New York which aired "Introduction to the Problem of Homosexuality", "Homosexuality: A Psychological Approach" and "Male and Female in American Society" during its 1956–1957 season. One notable exception to this rule was Showcase, hosted out of New York by author Fannie Hurst beginning in 1958. Showcase presented several of the earliest well-rounded discussions of homosexuality and was one of the few programs on which homosexual men spoke for themselves rather than being debated by a panel of "experts". Hurst was praised by early homophile group the Mattachine Society, which invited Hurst to deliver the keynote address at the society's 1958 convention.

A brief break from this pattern came in 1961 with the production of The Rejected, the first documentary program on homosexuality aired on American television. The Rejected presented information on such topics as the Kinsey Reports and featured anthropologist Margaret Mead discussing homosexuality in ancient Greece and among Native American cultures. A representative from the Mattachine Society also appeared on-air. However, the old model quickly re-emerged with such broadcasts as "Society and the Homosexual" in 1962 from the Los Angeles-based Argument and Chicago's Off the Cuff, which in 1963 presented a discussion of lesbianism with an all-male panel. CBS became the first national network to broadcast a documentary hour, in 1967. CBS Reports: The Homosexuals featured men interviewed in shadow and from behind potted plants to conceal their identities and anti-gay psychologists Charles W. Socarides and Irving Bieber in a broadcast that has been described as "the single most destructive hour of antigay propaganda in our nation's history".

During the 1960s, a few fiction series broached the subject obliquely, with "coded" or repressed lesbians like Miss Brant from 1961's The Asphalt Jungle or discussion of characters who may or may not have been gay like Channing's Buddy Crown in 1963. Those episodes that featured identified lesbian or gay characters tended to present them as either victims or killers. Following the 1969 Stonewall riots, a seminal event in the American gay rights movement, gay activist groups began speaking out more forcefully, challenging how homosexuality was portrayed on-screen.

== Episodes ==
Year	Series	Network or station	Episode	Synopsis
1951	I Love Lucy	CBS	"Lucy Thinks Ricky is Trying to Murder Her"	Lucy Ricardo (Lucille Ball) is mistakenly under the impression that her husband, Ricky Ricardo (Desi Arnaz) will murder her to have affairs with several women and "Theodore." In reality, Theodore is a dog to be in Ricky's show.
1954	Max Liebman Presents	NBC	"Lady in the Dark"	Russell Paxton (Carleton Carpenter), a staff photographer, oohs and aahs over an attractive male movie star just like the office girls do. Russell is perhaps the first identifiably gay character on American television.
1954	Confidential File	KTTV	"Homosexuals and the Problems They Present"	Host Paul Coates was praised in Variety following the first episode for his tasteful treatment of the topic.
1955	Confidential File	KTTV	"Homosexuals Who Stalk and Molest Our Children"	This type of show did its part in perpetuating false and negative stereotypes.
1956	The Open Mind	WRCA	"Introduction to the Problem of Homosexuality"	Local talk show produced in New York City. The episodes covered topics including whether homosexuality should be treated as a criminal or a medical matter, nature vs. nurture as the cause of homosexuality, and how society indoctrinates young people into gender roles. According to host Richard Heffner, after the first episode Cardinal Francis Spellman threatened to have NBC affiliate WRCA's broadcasting license revoked.
1956	The Open Mind	WRCA	"Homosexuality: A Psychological Approach"	Local talk show produced in New York City. The episodes covered topics including whether homosexuality should be treated as a criminal or a medical matter, nature vs. nurture as the cause of homosexuality, and how society indoctrinates young people into gender roles. According to host Richard Heffner, after the first episode Cardinal Francis Spellman threatened to have NBC affiliate WRCA's broadcasting license revoked.
1957	The Open Mind	WRCA	"Male and Female in American Society"	Local talk show produced in New York City. The episodes covered topics including whether homosexuality should be treated as a criminal or a medical matter, nature vs. nurture as the cause of homosexuality, and how society indoctrinates young people into gender roles. According to host Richard Heffner, after the first episode Cardinal Francis Spellman threatened to have NBC affiliate WRCA's broadcasting license revoked.
1957	Confession	WFAA	1957 episode	Local program produced out of Dallas; a 1957 episode featured an interview with a 22-year-old transvestite.
1958	Local program	WTVS	Are Homosexuals Criminal?	Local program produced in Detroit, Michigan.
1958	Showcase	WABD; WNTA	Untitled	A general discussion of male homosexuality. Hurst planned a second show for the following day on lesbians but moments before going on the air WABD management ordered her panel not to discuss the topic. Hurst angrily excoriated station management on the air for what she saw as censorship. Following this and other clashes with the station, Hurst moved her show to WNTA.
1959	Showcase	WABD; WNTA	Untitled	Another introductory discussion of the topic of homosexuality.
1959	Showcase	WABD; WNTA	"Problems of the Teenager Who Doesn't Fit"	Homosexual youth. Showcase was cancelled shortly after this episode aired, in April 1959, although it is unclear whether it was this episode that led to the cancellation.
1959	Showcase	WABD; WNTA	Untitled	Discussion of psychological and sociological aspects of homosexuality.
1961	The Asphalt Jungle	ABC	"The Sniper"	Miss Brant (Virginia Christine) is a repressed lesbian who shoots girls on lovers' lane for making themselves available to boys. The show was inspired by the 1950 film The Asphalt Jungle.
1961	The Rejected	KQED	The Rejected	The first television documentary about homosexuality. Each segment of the documentary included "experts" discussing specific perspectives, like medical, social, legal, anthropological. Karl Bowman, a pioneer in the study of psychiatry, explained why homosexuality is not a mental illness. It received generally positive reviews from the press.
1962	Confidential File	KTTV	Title unrecorded	Covering the 1962 convention of the Daughters of Bilitis and aired after Confidential File became syndicated nationally, this is probably the first national broadcast that specifically covered lesbianism.
1962	Argument	KTTV	"Society and the Homosexual"	One of the few talk show entries that included a discussion of lesbianism, including an actual lesbian panelist.
1963	The Eleventh Hour	NBC	"What Did She Mean By Good Luck?"	High-strung actress Hallie Lambert (Kathryn Hays) is diagnosed by her psychiatrist with lesbian tendencies. She believes her director Marya Stone (Beverly Garland) hates her, but her psychiatrist realizes that Lambert is actually in love with Stone and channeling her confusion into hostility.
1963	Channing	ABC	"The Last Testament of Buddy Crown"	Buddy drowns while trying to swim across a lake. His father (David Wayne) believed Buddy was homosexual and Buddy was taunted by his peers for being different, although the episode does not specifically identify Buddy as having been gay.
1963	Off the Cuff	WBKB	"Homosexuality and Lesbianism"	Local talk show produced in Chicago.
1964	Kup's Show	WBKB	Title unrecorded	Host Irv Kupcinet devoted an episode to a conference held by the Chicago chapter of the Mattachine Society.
1964	The Les Crane Show	WABC	Title unrecorded	Host Les Crane interviewed gay activist Randy Wicker, who also took telephone calls from viewers.
1965	Alfred Hitchcock Presents	NBC	"An Unlocked Window"	A transvestite strangles nurses to death. The killer was portrayed by professional female impersonator T. C. Jones.
1965	Other Voices	NET	"Every Tenth Man"	An episode of the CBC Television series Other Voices syndicated to the United States. Information on this broadcast is minimal but it is known to have included an appearance by sexologist Albert Ellis. The episode is known to have been broadcast in Boston, Denver, New York City, Philadelphia and San Francisco.
1966	FYI	WTVJ	"The Homosexual"	Locally produced program that came out "against the homosexual child molester and toward the parent who never thought it could happen to his or her son". Guests included representatives of the Dade County Sheriff's Department, the Florida legislature and Richard Inman, president of the Mattachine Society of Florida.
1967	The David Susskind Show	Syndicated	"Are Homosexuals Sick?"	Susskind did indeed believe that homosexuals were mentally ill but also believed that they should be treated with compassion and not punished for it.
1967	CBS Reports	CBS	"CBS Reports: The Homosexuals"	The first network documentary about homosexuality, aired March 7, 1967. Gay men were interviewed in shadow and from behind potted plants. The episode was widely condemned, and anchor Mike Wallace later repudiated his participation.
1967	N.Y.P.D.	ABC	"Shakedown"	Police track down a blackmail ring targeting closeted gay men. Homophile leader Charles Spad (John Harkins) is most likely the first self-identified gay character on broadcast television. James Broderick plays a gay construction worker.
1967	The Joe Pyne Show	Syndicated	Title unrecorded	Pyne interviewed couple and early gay rights activists Harry Hay and John Burnside.
1967	My Three Sons	Syndicated	"The Chameleon"	Ernie's new playmate, Mike (Gina Picerni), is actually a girl named Michelle. Unfortunately, Michelle's father, (Paul Picerni) treats her like his son rather than his daughter, only talking about sports and other boy things, so the Douglas' try to bring out her feminine side.
1968	CBS Playhouse	CBS	"Secrets"	A mother (Eileen Heckart) is on trial for murdering her gay son and a man (Arthur Hill) refuses to say why he cannot serve on the jury. A supporting character, Cary (Barry Nelson), may be gay.
1968	Judd, for the Defense	ABC	"Weep the Hunter Home"	A father (Harold Gould) fears that his son's best friend (Peter Jason) is a homosexual and that he is trying to turn his son (Richard Dreyfuss) gay. The boys are mixed up in a phony kidnapping scheme.
1969	The Bold Ones: The Lawyers	NBC	"Shriek of Silence"	Barry Goram (Morgan Sterne) murders gubernatorial candidate and long-time friend Stephen Patterson (Craig Stevens) after Patterson discovers Goram is gay and fires him from his campaign staff.
1969	N.Y.P.D.	ABC	"Everybody Loved Him"	A successful film producer is murdered by a closeted and psychotic elevator operator (Walter McGinn).

== See also ==
- List of 1970s American television episodes with LGBTQ themes
- List of 1980s American television episodes with LGBTQ themes
- List of 1990s American television episodes with LGBTQ themes
- List of made-for-television films with LGBTQ characters
- Lists of television programs with LGBTQ characters
