= Lavender Scare =

Mid-20th century U.S. government discrimination against homosexuals

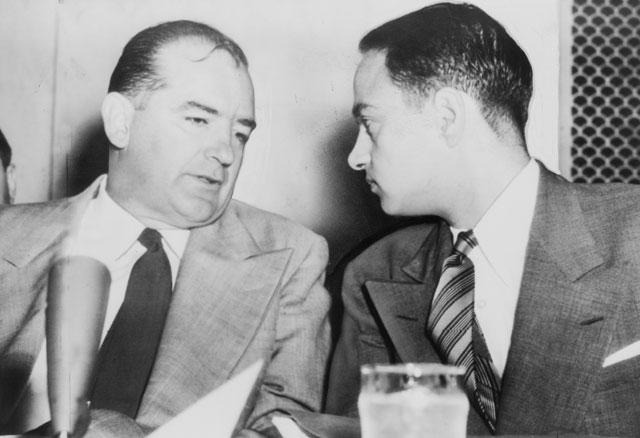
Joseph McCarthy and Roy Cohn during the Army–McCarthy hearings

The Lavender Scare was a moral panic about homosexual people in the United States government which led to their mass dismissal from government service during the mid-20th century. It contributed to and paralleled the anti-communist campaign which is known as McCarthyism and the Second Red Scare. Gay men and lesbians were said to be national security risks and communist sympathizers, which led to the call to remove them from state employment. It was also thought that due to the stigma around homosexuality, gay people were vulnerable to blackmail, which could lead to a breach in national security. Lesbians were at less risk of persecution than gay men, but some lesbians were interrogated or lost their jobs. The focus on persecuting homosexuals in state employment, through McCarthyism and the Second Red Scare, led to more alleged homosexuals being persecuted than alleged communists during the campaign.

The Lavender Scare normalized persecution of homosexuals through bureaucratic institutionalization of homophobia. Former U.S. senator Alan K. Simpson wrote: "The so-called 'Red Scare' has been the main focus of most historians of that period of time. A lesser-known element and one that harmed far more people was the witch-hunt McCarthy and others conducted against homosexuals."

== Etymology ==
The term for this persecution was popularized by David K. Johnson's 2004 book which studied this anti-homosexual campaign, The Lavender Scare. The book drew its title from the term "lavender lads", used repeatedly by Senator Everett Dirksen as a synonym for homosexual males. In 1952, Dirksen said that a Republican victory in the November elections would mean the removal of "the lavender lads" from the State Department. The phrase was also used by Confidential magazine, a periodical known for gossiping about the sexuality of politicians and prominent Hollywood stars.

== History ==
Well before the congressional investigations of 1950, U.S. institutions had already developed an intricate and effective system of regulations, tactics, and personnel to uncover homosexuals that would become enforcement mechanisms during the Lavender Scare. Naoko Shibusawa states this system was related to a general expansion of the bureaucratic state during the late nineteenth century, with institutions that increasingly systematically categorized people as unfit or fit, including homosexuals in the unfit category along with people who were designated as "criminally insane" or "morally depraved", even though they did not consistently take regulatory action on this until later. Margot Canaday and Michael S. Sherry have stated that Cold War homophobia (as well as a "moral sex panic" that dates back to the Great Depression) occurred in a context of "perceived shifts in gender relations, race relations, the ongoing dislocations of late capitalism, continuing urbanisation, economic and foreign crises, post-war adjustment, and the entrenchment of a consumer society and culture allegedly dominated by women." Despite this, exclusion of gays from the civil service, on the other hand, did not seem to be considered prior to the Cold War. In contrast to the military, the State Department was unconcerned about gays in war. The issue was not on the public's radar, either, except perhaps in the sense of perceptions of the diplomatic corps as consisting of effete, privileged types.

In 1947, at the beginning of the Cold War and the heightened concern about internal security, the State Department began campaigns to rid the department of communists and homosexuals, and they established a set of "security principles" that went on to inspire the creation of a dual loyalty-security test which became the model for other government agencies, as well as the basis for a government-wide security program under President Dwight D. Eisenhower's administration. Under the criteria of the State Department's security principles, "disloyal" persons included communists, their associates, and those guilty of espionage, along with persons known for "habitual drunkenness, sexual perversion, moral turpitude, financial irresponsibility or criminal record," and were to be denied federal employment. With the inclusion of "sexual perversion" among those considered unsuitable for federal employment, discrimination against homosexuals was implicitly built into State Department policy, and it was grandfathered into federal governmental protocol and procedure. Between 1947 and 1950, over 1700 applicants to federal jobs were denied the positions due to allegations of homosexuality.

The language of the Lavender Scare was purposely vague as instead of being referred to directly, homosexuals and perverts were often called "moral weaklings," "sexual misfits," "moral risks," "misfits," "undesirables," or persons with "unusual morals." The euphemistic term "security risk" was thought by many people at the time and many historians since assumed to be simply a lesser version of a Communist — someone with Communist sympathies but no outright party connections. "Loyalty risk" and "security risk" were considered very similar or essentially different terminology for the same thing. But when defining the difference between a loyalty risk and a security risk, government officials typically explained that "loyalty" involved a current state of mind, a willful desire to betray secrets, while "security" involved behaviors or associations that might lead one inadvertently or unwillingly to betray secrets in the future. Thus, the government and state department gave themselves the ability to expel government officials without any evidence of them being a communist, but by purely the risk they might be due to inadvertent tendencies and possibilities.

Even before the 1947 establishment of State Department security principles, the United States military had developed discriminatory policies targeting gay men and lesbians. In 1940, President Roosevelt and his Selective Service advisers were convinced by psychiatrists of the need to implement screening programs to determine the mental health of potential soldiers as to reduce the cost of psychiatric rehabilitation for returning veterans. Although the initial plan for psychiatric screenings of military recruits included no direct references to homosexuality, within a year, direct references were added – this development in military bureaucratic processes contributed towards the momentum of the military's preoccupation with homosexuality during World War II. The new psychiatric screening directives and procedures introduced to the military the idea that homosexuals were unfit to serve in the armed forces because they were mentally ill: a change from the military's traditional way of approaching homosexuality as a crime. During World War I, punishment of homosexual soldiers was first codified in American military law, and during World War II, final regulations were declared and homosexuals were banned from all branches of the military in 1943. Despite all of the regulations, the need for troops allowed for loopholes regarding the acceptance/rejection of homosexuals to fight in war. Around 4,000–5,000 out of 18 million men that had been in consideration were turned away. Those serving in the military were ordered to report homosexual acts by other soldiers that were serving. Between two thousand and five thousand soldiers were suspected to be homosexuals in the military, where women were discharged at a higher rate than men.

If the influx of people into Washington, D.C., during the New Deal created the urban and professional environments that allowed a gay and lesbian subculture to flourish, then World War II accelerated the process: for many lesbians and gay men, the war was a national coming out experience. Mobilization for World War II and the war experience gave birth to a new addition to the American social urban landscape – the lesbian and gay community. To many Americans, this visible homosexual subculture seemed to prove their suspicions that the war had loosened puritanical moral codes, broadened sexual mores and certainly represented a viable threat to ideals of puritanical gender roles, heterosexuality, and the nuclear family. After the war, as families were united and as Americans struggled to put their lives back together, a national narrative rigorously promoted and propagated idealized versions of the nuclear family, heterosexuality, and traditional gender roles in the home and the workplace.

In February 1950, Senator Joseph McCarthy claimed 205 communists were working in the State Department, Undersecretary of State John Peurifoy said that the State Department had allowed 91 homosexuals to resign. Only two of these were women. Following this, the administration of President Harry Truman was accused of not taking the "threat" of homosexuality seriously enough. In June 1950, an investigation by the Senate began into the government's employment of homosexuals. The results were not released until December, but in the meantime federal job losses due to allegations of homosexuality increased greatly, rising from approximately 5 to 60 per month. On April 19, 1950, the Republican national chairman Guy George Gabrielson said that "sexual perverts who have infiltrated our Government in recent years" were "perhaps as dangerous as the actual Communists". The danger was not solely because they were gay, however. Homosexuals were considered to be more susceptible to blackmail and thus were labeled as security risks. McCarthy hired Roy Cohn as chief counsel of his Congressional subcommittee. Together, McCarthy and Cohn – with the enthusiastic support of the head of the FBI, J. Edgar Hoover – were responsible for the firing of scores of gay men and women from government employment, and strong-armed many opponents into silence using rumors of their homosexuality. In 1953, during the final months of the Truman administration, the State Department reported that it had fired 425 employees for allegations of homosexuality. While the secretary of state, Dean Acheson, reportedly defended the employees of the State Department, calling McCarthy's antics a "filthy business", the department as a whole responded to the allegations against it with a concentrated effort to remove homosexuals from its ranks.

McCarthy often used accusations of homosexuality as a smear tactic in his anti-communist crusade, often combining the Second Red Scare with the Lavender Scare. On one occasion, he went so far as to announce to reporters, "If you want to be against McCarthy, boys, you've got to be either a Communist or a cocksucker." At least one recent historian has argued that, by linking communism and homosexuality with psychological imbalance, McCarthy was employing guilt-by-association when evidence for communist activity was lacking. Political rhetoric at the time often linked communists and homosexuals, and common beliefs among the public were similar, stating that both were "morally weak" or "psychologically disturbed," along with being godless and undermining traditional families.

For example, McCarthy spoke on the Senate floor about two individual people, "Case 14" and "Case 62," as communists who were "unsafe risks" which he directly linked to their homosexuality. He said a top intelligence official had told him "every active communist is twisted mentally or physically," and he implied that these people were vulnerable to recruitment by communists because of their "peculiar mental twists" of homosexuality.

McCarthy's Red Scare did not just persecute homosexuals as a byproduct, but as a main feature of the campaign, with more alleged homosexuals being caught than alleged communists.

Due to the image of the State Department now being tainted with homosexuality, many male employees became self-conscious about the possibility of being perceived as homosexual. They often refused to be seen in pairs, and made statements confirming their heterosexuality when introducing themselves. For example, one unnamed employee often said at parties, "Hi, I'm so-and-so, I work for the State Department. I'm married and I have three children."

=== Executive Order 10450 ===
In 1953, President Eisenhower signed Executive Order 10450, which set security standards for federal employment and barred homosexuals from working in the federal government. The restrictions set in place were cause for hundreds of gay people to be forcibly outed and fired from the State Department. The executive order was also the cause for the firing of approximately 5,000 gay people from federal employment; this included private contractors and military personnel. Not only did the victims lose their jobs, but also they were forced out of the closet and thrust into the public eye as lesbian or gay.

Specifically, Truman's loyalty program had been extended through this executive order: "sexual perversion" was added to a list of behaviors that would keep a person from holding a position in government. There were many new regulations and policies put into place to detect and remove gay, lesbian, and bisexual people. The new procedures to search out homosexuals were frequently used to interview and look for signs of sexual orientation. They also looked at places these individuals frequently visited, such as gay bars, and they even found people guilty by association. If their friends or family showed signs of being homosexual, they might also be suspected.

By the mid-1950s, similar repressive and oppressive policies had gone into effect in state and local governments which extended the prohibitions on the employment of lesbians and gay men to cover twelve million workers – more than twenty percent of the United States labor force – who now had to sign oaths attesting to their moral purity to get or to keep their jobs.

During the Vietnam War draft, men sometimes attempted to exploit Executive Order 10450 in order to avoid national military service- often by claiming to be homosexual, lying about being homosexual, adopting exaggerated stereotypical mannerisms of gay men, or providing letters from psychiatrists. While this was sometimes successful, other times men were sometimes drafted in spite of their proclaimed homosexuality. This was likely from a demand to fill draft quotas and out of concern that they were attempting to fraudulently dodge the draft.

In 1973, a federal judge ruled a person's sexual orientation could not be the sole reason for termination from federal employment, and, in 1975, the United States Civil Service Commission announced that they would consider applications by gays and lesbians on a case-by-case basis. Executive Order 10450 stayed partly in effect until 1995 when President Bill Clinton rescinded the order and put in place the "don't ask, don't tell" policy for admittance of gays into the military. In 1998, the order's language concerning employment and sexual orientation was also repealed when Clinton signed Executive Order 13087. And, in 2017, the order was explicitly repealed when President Barack Obama signed Executive Order 13764.

=== Association of communism with "subversives" ===
Both homosexuals and Communist Party members were seen as subversive elements in American society who all shared the same ideals of antitheism, rejection of bourgeois culture and middle-class morality, and lack of conformity. They were also seen as scheming and manipulative and, most importantly, would put their own agendas above others in the eyes of the general population. McCarthy also associated homosexuality and communism as "threats to the 'American way of life'." [Homosexuals and communists] were perceived as hidden subcultures with their own meeting places, literature, cultural codes, and bonds of loyalty. [They] were thought to recruit the psychologically weak or disturbed [and] many believed the two were working together to undermine the government. David K. Johnson notes that without an idealized traditional American moral fiber, any citizen could succumb to immoral temptations such as homosexuality; and they could ultimately be seduced by communism. The association of homosexuality with communism proved to be a convenient political tool to develop and implement homophobic discriminatory policy throughout the federal government. It was easy to convince a Congress dictated by a communist containment policy to respond to the perceived homosexual menace because they were already viewed to be not only subversive social elements of American culture, but subversive political elements. Homosexuality was directly linked to security concerns, and more government employees were dismissed because of their homosexual sexual orientation than because they were left-leaning or communist. George Chauncey noted that: "The specter of the invisible homosexual, like that of the invisible communist, haunted Cold War America," and homosexuality (and by implication homosexuals themselves) were constantly referred to not only as a disease, but also as an invasion, like the perceived danger of communism and subversives.

According to Naoko Shibusawa, visions of the larger world and America's role in it played into the heightened fear and loathing of gays during this period. Shibusawa states that the supposed threat in the rise of homosexuality utilised by competing political economies was compounded by an ideological element to the wave of homophobia that produced the Lavender Scare in post-war America with its connection to empire. Notions about sexuality were part of the narratives that shaped worldviews, defined relationships, and guided action; agitation about potentially traitorous gays, moreover, derived also from efforts to distinguish American civilization or modernity, not only from the Soviets, but also from the "masses" of the decolonizing world. According to Shibusawa, Americans had been convinced that moral decline was inevitable since the Enlightenment period and thought that the narrative of a successful advance toward progress and modernity always ended badly; since the country's earliest days, Americans looked for signs of "overcivilization," and increase in homosexuality was seen as a sign of overcivilization. Shibusawa states that sexuality was an elemental way in which hierarchies of power were rationalized in an imperialist framework: who was civilized/uncivilized or worthy/unworthy, and that, by the mid-twentieth century, these rationalizations were deeply informed by a Freudian theory that was ideological but taken and implemented as if it were purely objective science. Because of this, states Shibusawa, many domestically believed the United States now played a vital role "stabilising" the global arena formerly controlled by the European imperial powers, and such became a recurring theme in the larger public discourse. Shibusawa states this was evident not only in the Luce media, but also in another widely read publication: the magazine Reader's Digest, which served pedagogical, nationalist, and internationalist purposes during the Cold War.

Senator Kenneth Wherry similarly attempted to invoke a connection between homosexuality and anti-nationalism. He said in an interview with Max Lerner: "You can't hardly separate homosexuals from subversives." Later in that same interview, he drew the line between patriotic Americans and gay men: "But look, Lerner, we're both Americans, aren't we? I say, let's get these fellows [closeted gay men in government positions] out of the government."

The term "Homintern" was coined in the 1930s, possibly by Cyril Connolly, W. H. Auden, or Harold Norse, as a camp term playing off of "Comintern" (Communist International). It was first used to describe an imagined group of gay men who controlled the art world, and later used in reference to "a fantastical gay international that sought to control the world". In 1952, an article written by R. G. Waldeck argued that this conspiracy was a real and important reason to expel homosexual people from the State Department, even more important than the possibility of blackmail, and this article was read into the Congressional Record and cited by others.

While the Mattachine Society was founded by Harry Hay, a former member of the Communist Party USA, Hay resigned from the society when the membership condemned his politics as a threat to the organization he had founded.

An example of this connection of homosexuality and communism to subversion being used by McCarthy is with Dorothy Kenyon. Where Miss Kenyon was accused of having communist sympathies. The main evidence McCarthy presented being that a "security risk" homosexual federal worker had lost his job and then got reinstated under pressure by an official associated with Kenyon. Relating the idea of homosexual protection to communist sympathies.

=== Subcommittee on Investigations ===
The Subcommittee on Investigations was a subcommittee of the Committee on Expenditures in Executive Departments. This subcommittee chaired by Democratic senator Clyde R. Hoey from 1949 to 1952 investigated "the employment of homosexuals in the Federal workforce." A related report, known as the Hoey Report, stated that all of the government's intelligence agencies "are in complete agreement that sex perverts in Government constitute security risks." The congressional Wherry-Hill and Hoey Committee investigation hearings were held between March and May, and July and September 1950 respectively. Republican senator Kenneth Wherry and Democratic senator Lester Hill formed a subcommittee to make preliminary investigations into the "Infiltration of Subversives and Moral Perverts into the Executive Branch of the United States Government." No records of the Wherry-Hill investigation survive beyond press coverage and two published reports. One such report contained the statements of the head of the DC Metropolitan Police Department vice squad, Lieutenant Roy Blick, who testified that 5,000 homosexuals lived in Washington, D.C., and that around 3,700 were federal employees. Lt. Blick's comments, which were speculative at best, further fueled the media storm surrounding the gays-in-government controversy; the Wherry-Hill preliminary investigation convinced the Senate to launch a full-scale congressional exploration.

The recommended investigation was assigned to the Committee on Expenditures in Executive Departments, led by Senator Clyde Hoey, and the full Senate unanimously authorized the investigation into sexual perversion in the federal workforce; with outrage mounting to astronomical heights, no Senator dared speak out against it lest they risk their political career. Investigating the "Employment of Homosexuals and Other Sex Perverts in Government," the subcommittee came to be known as the Hoey Committee and while the White House under President Truman was heavily involved in managing its methodology and processes, the driving force behind the congressional investigation of homosexuals was its chief counsel, former FBI agent Francis Flanagan. The Hoey Committee consulted with and heard testimony from law enforcement, judicial authorities, military and governmental security officers, and medical experts. Rather than uncovering any evidence of any federal employee being blackmailed into revealing state secrets on account of their homosexuality, the investigation uncovered considerable differences of opinion, even within the government, over federal policy of homosexual exclusion and over whether foreign government agents had ever attempted to blackmail homosexuals.

The Hoey Committee's conclusive report, released in mid-December that year, ignored the ambiguities of testimony and deemed authoritatively that there was "no place in the United States Government for persons who violate the laws or the accepted standards of morality," especially those who "bring disrepute to the Federal service by infamous or scandalous conduct," stating that lesbians and gay men were "unsuitable" for federal employment because they were "security risks" as well as people engaged in illegal and immoral activities. The committee recommended that the military's policy and procedure should be used as the model; in the areas of explicit policies, standardized procedures, uniform enforcement, constant vigilance, and coordination with law enforcement agencies regarding homosexuals, the armed services set the precedent. Further, the Hoey Committee report stated that in the past, the federal government "failed to take a realistic view of the problem of sex perversion," and that to adequately protect the "public interest," the federal government must "adopt and maintain a realistic and vigilant attitude toward the problem of sex perverts in the Government."

The authoritative findings of the Wherry-Hill and Hoey Committee congressional investigations directly helped the Lavender Scare move beyond a strictly Republican rhetoric towards bipartisan appeal, and purging lesbians and gay men from federal employment quickly became part of standard, government-wide policy. The major purpose and achievement of the Wherry-Hill and Hoey Committees was the construction and promotion of the belief that homosexuals in the military and federal government constituted security risks who, as individuals or working in conspiracy with members of the Communist Party, threatened the safety of the nation.

=== Sexuality ===
When Cohn brought on G. David Schine as chief consultant to the McCarthy staff, speculation arose that Schine and Cohn had a sexual relationship. During the Army–McCarthy hearings, Cohn denied having any "special interest" in Schine or being bound to him "closer than to the ordinary friend." Joseph Welch, the Army's attorney in the hearings, made an apparent reference to Cohn's homosexuality. After asking a witness, at McCarthy's request, if a photo entered as evidence "came from a pixie", he defined "pixie" as "a close relative of a fairy". Though "pixie" was a camera-model name at the time, the comparison to "fairy," a derogatory term for a homosexual man, had clear implications. The people at the hearing recognized the slur and found it amusing; Cohn later called the remark "malicious," "wicked," and "indecent."

McCarthy's allegiance to Cohn also raised suspicions that the relation between the senator and his chief counsel was not merely professional, or that McCarthy was blackmailed by Cohn. Earlier in 1952, Nevada publisher Hank Greenspun wrote that McCarthy "often engaged in homosexual activities" and was a frequent patron at the White Horse Inn, a Milwaukee gay bar. McCarthy's FBI file also contains numerous allegations, including a 1952 letter from an Army lieutenant who said, "When I was in Washington some time ago, [McCarthy] picked me up at the bar in the Wardman [Hotel] and took me home, and while I was half-drunk he committed sodomy on me." J. Edgar Hoover conducted a perfunctory investigation of the senator's alleged sexual assault of the young man; his approach was that "homosexuals are very bitter against Senator McCarthy for his attack upon those who are supposed to be in the Government."

Additionally, Kinsey Institute author and researcher C. A. Tripp writes about McCarthy in his book The Homosexual Matrix, describing him as "predominantly homosexual". Tripp compares McCarthy's (and Cohn's) motivation behind the Lavender Scare to the anti-Semitism of certain Jews.

=== Contemporaneous views of homosexuality ===
Washington, D.C., had a fairly large and active gay community before McCarthy launched his campaign against homosexuals, but as time went on and the climate of the Cold War spread, so too did negative views of homosexuals. Because social attitudes toward homosexuality were overwhelmingly negative and the psychiatric community regarded homosexuality as a mental disorder, gay men and lesbians were considered susceptible to blackmail, thus constituting a security risk. U.S. government officials assumed that communists would blackmail homosexual employees of the federal government to provide them classified information rather than risk exposure. The 1957 Crittenden Report of the United States Navy Board of Inquiry concluded that there was "no sound basis for the belief that homosexuals posed a security risk" and criticized the prior Hoey Report: "No intelligence agency, as far as can be learned, adduced any factual data before that committee with which to support these opinions" and said that "the concept that homosexuals necessarily pose a security risk is unsupported by adequate factual data." The Crittenden Report remained secret until 1976. Navy officials claimed they had no record of studies of homosexuality, but attorneys learned of its existence and obtained it through a Freedom of Information Act request. As of September 1981, the Navy claimed it was still unable to fulfill a request for the Report's supporting documentation.

Shibusawa states that the Lavender Scare's logic was circular: homophobia supposedly made gays vulnerable and potential victims of blackmail, but the era's policies of increasing homophobia theoretically made gays even more vulnerable to blackmail. Reducing the social opprobrium directed at gays as a solution to their potential disloyalty appears never to have been seriously considered. She states that this did not seem to matter because of the factual precedent of a gay U.S. government employee or military man being blackmailed into betraying his nation by the Soviet enemy—or even by the recent Axis enemies—had not actually occurred; it was the association between homosexuality and potential disloyalty which meant distinction between the two became blurred. According to Shibusawa, in other words, if one could see who the traitor was, then the traitor could not commit treason, and so to cope with this paradox, the federal government's security regulations thus tried "to localise treason as a surreptitious evil by making it a function of other patent evils." Thus, states Shibusawa, the State Department followed the logic of categorising together those with putatively undesirable traits - however illogical such categorizations might have actually been.

Outside of government circles, the attitude to homosexuality was somewhat more relaxed, although no less negative. Amongst the general public, jokes about the perceived rampant homosexuality within the state department flourished, aided by satirical writers such as Westbrook Pegler. These jokes made the very name of the state department synonymous with homosexuality, and reflected wider American fears that the state department was becoming emasculated and weak.

Significant to wider views of homosexuality in America during the lavender scare were the attempts to "clean up" public spaces from the supposed moral threat of gay people. This manifested in the 'Pervert Elimination Campaign'. The U.S. Park Police on October 1, 1947, began the initiative to arrest gay men in known cruising areas across District of Columbia parkland. While most of the men could not be brought before a judge, most were kept long enough to be profiled and documented into their own "pervert file", officiating the process somewhat. This practice impacted men from across all walks of life—by 1950, two hundred men had been arrested and more than five hundred apprehended without arrest as a result of the 'Pervert Elimination Campaign'.

According to John Loughery, author of a study of gay identity in the 20th century, "few events indicate how psychologically wracked America was becoming in the 1950s ... than the presumed overlap of the Communist and the homosexual menace."

The research of Evelyn Hooker, presented in 1956, and the first conducted without a polluted sample (gay men who had been treated for mental illness) dispelled the illusory correlation between homosexuality and mental illness that prior research, conducted with polluted sampling, had established. Hooker presented a team of three expert evaluators with 60 unmarked psychological profiles from her year of research. She chose to leave the interpretation of her results to others, to avoid potential bias. The evaluators concluded that in terms of adjustment, there were no differences between the members of each group. Her demonstration that homosexuality is not a form of mental illness led to its eventual removal from the American Psychiatric Association's Diagnostic and Statistical Manual of Mental Disorders.

=== Experiences of men and women ===
Lesbians were generally targeted less than gay men due to women in general having less access to public spaces, as well as not being part of arrest records from prominently gay male spaces. However, women in governmental positions, such as Madeleine Tress, who worked for the Department of Commerce, were subject to an intense interrogation in April 1958 surrounding her sexuality which was subsequently followed by a confession of homosexual activity in her youth. Tress was forced to resign from her job. This continued in places of lower positions such as public servant units, most notably to Helen G. James. James faced intense examinations into her private and personal life on and off base by the OSI (Office of Special Investigation). Following her arrest, OSI investigators threatened to tell James' relatives and friends and forced her to sign her removal from the Air Force with an "undesirable" discharge.

Gay men and lesbians who were character references for one another would be investigated by association. Getting outed would lead to jobs being lost, social lives being exposed, and in many cases suicide. The experiences of these men and women led to the formation of underground communities in order to avoid government intervention.

== Resistance ==
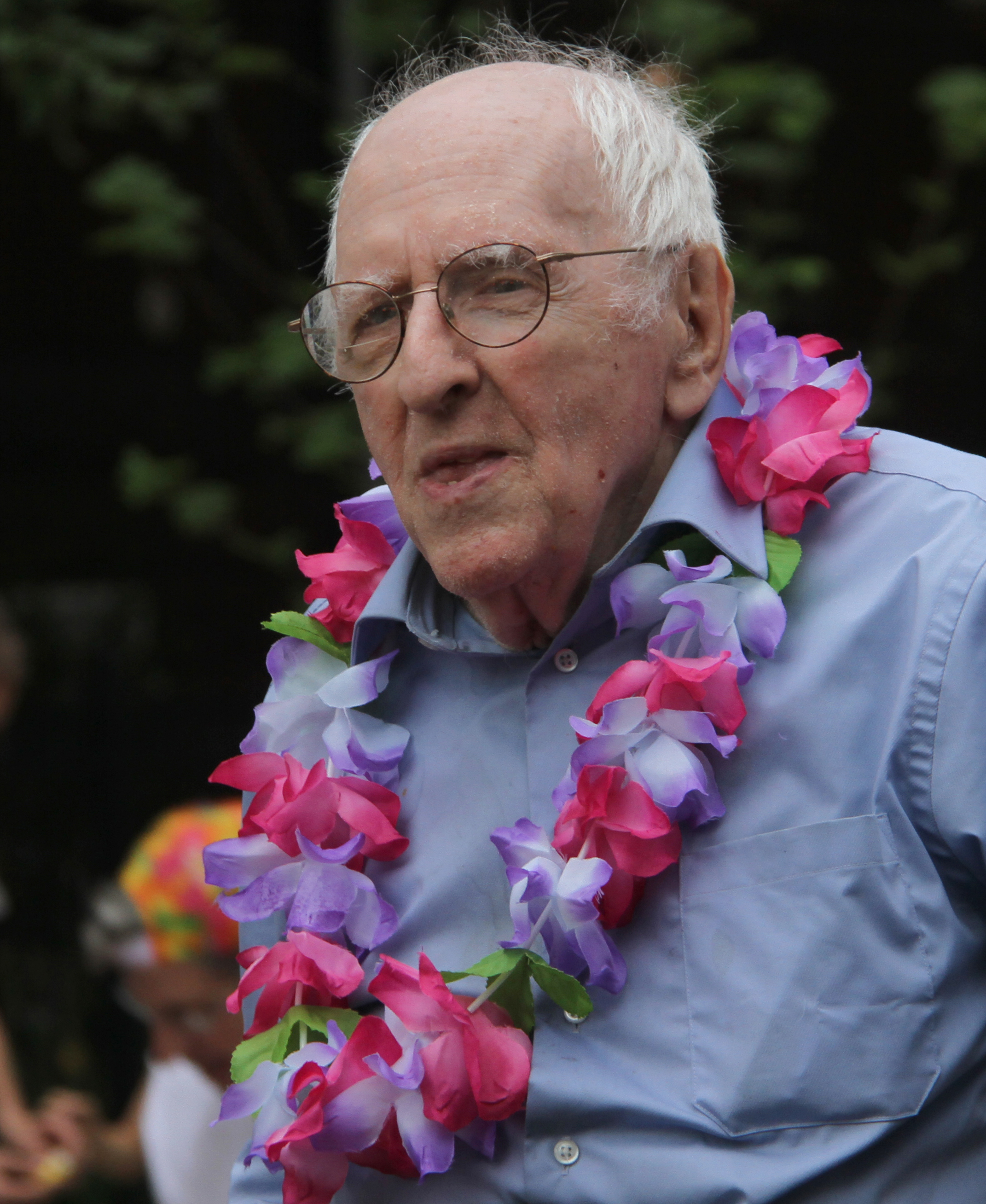
Frank Kameny

Frank Kameny, an influential early member of the gay rights movement, faced unemployment because of his sexual orientation in 1957. He was working as an astronomer for the United States Army Map Service, but was fired as a result of the Lavender Scare and could never find another job in the United States federal government again. This led to Kameny devoting his life to the gay rights movement. In 1965, four years before the Stonewall Riots, Kameny picketed the White House on the grounds of gay rights.

Kameny was also integral to setting up the Mattachine Society of Washington (MSW) in 1960. Distinct from the other Mattachine Societies established in California and other parts of the U.S. in the 1950s, Kameny's MSW held more militant values beyond assimilation into heterosexual culture. These values, in part, stemmed from Kameny's experiences of discrimination from Lavender Scare era policies.

Accompanying Kameny in his activism was his co-founder for the MSW - Jack Nichols. Nichols was particularly interesting as he was the son of an FBI agent of the same name - Douglas Charles has written in depth on their relationship and how the potential embarrassment that Nichols' sexuality could have caused the FBI led to the relationship dissolving between the pair. This guilt by association affected even those such as Nichols who did not fall victim to the Lavender Scare in losing his occupation.

According to Lillian Faderman, the LGBT community formed a subculture of its own in this era, constituting "not only a choice of sexual orientation, but of social orientation as well." The Mattachine Society and the Daughters of Bilitis, which formed the homophile movements of the U.S., were in many ways defined by McCarthyism and the Lavender Scare. They were underground organizations that maintained the anonymity of their members.

A group of eight lesbians in San Francisco formed a group called Daughters of Bilitis in September 1955. It was initially set up as way 'to meet and interact with other lesbians in a safe environment.' They later sought to change laws criminalizing homosexuality.

The homophile movement, including the Daughters of Bilitis and the Mattachine Society, has been considered the predecessor to the lesbian and gay liberation movement of the late 1960s and early 1970s.

Changes in popular culture also led to a rise in resistance against the homophobic nature of society. Fiction by authors including John Horne Burns, Truman Capote, Charles Jackson, Carson McCullers, Thomas Hal Phillips, Jo Sinclair, Tereska Torrès, and Gore Vidal led readers to question the nation's collective hostility to homosexuality. Homoeroticism became mainstream with the publication of physique photography magazines. In 1949, Cosmopolitan featured an article called "The Unmentionable Minority", which was about the struggle faced by homosexuals.

== Legacy ==
Though the main vein of McCarthyism ended in the mid-1950s when the 1956 Cole v. Young ruling severely weakened the ability to fire people from the federal government for discriminatory reasons, the movement that was born from it, the Lavender Scare, lived on. One such way was that Executive Order 10450, which was not rescinded until 1995, continued to bar gays from entering the military. Another form of the Lavender Scare that persisted was the Florida Legislative Investigation Committee, also referred to as the FLIC and the Johns Committee. The FLIC was founded in 1956 and was not disbanded until 1964. The purpose of the committee was to operate within Florida continuing the work of the Lavender Scare by investigating and firing public school teachers who were gay. During its active years the FLIC was responsible for more than 200 firings of alleged gay teachers. The FLIC was disbanded following the release of the Purple Pamphlet due to public outrage over its explicit and pornographic nature.

The witch-hunt over homosexuals was referred to as "A surviving McCarthyism", in that despite the main campaign of McCarthyism being over homosexual purges were still occurring even into 1964 with examples such as Walter Jenkins.

It has also been suggested that contemporary attitudes towards LGBT people in America have been shaped by the Lavender Scare. The 'Pervert Elimination Campaign' and the criminalization of gay men existing in public spaces demonstrates how attitudes towards LGBT people during the Lavender Scare shifted towards intolerance in public spaces. Brandon Andrew Robinson has suggested that this criminalization of LGBT people in public spaces has impacted how LGBT people now exist within America. Robinson has said that acceptance of LGBT people depends on their ability to assimilate as far as possible into American 'heteronormative institutions', in part due to the intolerant attitudes that developed towards LGBT people within public life during the years of the Lavender Scare.

In January 2017, the State Department formally apologized following suggestion by Senator Ben Cardin. Cardin also noted that investigations by the state department into homosexuality of federal employees continued as late as the 1990s.

== Documentary ==
The Lavender Scare, directed by Josh Howard and narrated by Glenn Close, is a documentary film that recounts the events of the Lavender Scare. David K. Johnson is part of the project, as the film is based on his book. To help with funding, Josh Howard created a Kickstarter that met its goal in donations. The film was completed, screened at more than 70 film festivals around the world, and opened at theaters in New York City and Los Angeles in 2019. PBS televised the film on June 18, 2019.

== In popular culture ==
The 2016 opera Fellow Travelers, based on the 2007 novel by Thomas Mallon, is set in McCarthy-era Washington D.C. and centers on the love affair between two men working for the federal government during the Lavender Scare.

The 2019 alternate history series For All Mankind features two NASA employees who pose as a couple to evade the Lavender Scare.

The 2023 mini-series Fellow Travelers, also based on the 2007 novel by Thomas Mallon, centers on the decades-long romance between two men who first meet during the height of McCarthyism.

== See also ==
- Sissy villain
- Advise and Consent
- Joseph Alsop
- Newton Arvin
- Blue discharge
- Boise homosexuality scandal
- Civil Service Reform Act of 1978
- Executive Order 11478
- Fellow Travelers (opera)
- Fellow Travelers (miniseries)
- Fruit machine (homosexuality test)
- Gay Purges (Canada)
- Gays and Lesbians in Foreign Affairs Agencies
- Heteronationalism
- Honey trapping
- Homosexual seduction
- Is Homosexuality a Menace?
- Walter Jenkins
- Last Night at the Telegraph Club
- LGBT history in the United States
- LGBT rights in the United States
- Martin and Mitchell Defection
- R. W. Scott McLeod
- Helen G. James
- Carmel Offie
- Samuel Reber
- Seduction of the Innocent
- Sexual orientation and the United States military
- Charles W. Thayer
- Arthur H. Vandenberg, Jr.
- Wright Commission on Government Security
- Lester C. Hunt
