= Lige =

Lige is a given name. Notable people with this name include:

- Lige Clarke (1942–1975), American activist
- Lige Conley (né Elijah Crommie; 1897–1937), American actor
- Lige (理格), Chinese name of Teodorico Pedrini (1671–1746), Italian priest and musician
- Lige Daniels (1904–1920), American victim of lynching

== See also ==
- Bernard Lige Austin (1902–1979), American admiral
