= The Fall of '55 =

- DVD cover
- Directed by: Seth Randal
- Written by: Seth Randal
- Produced by: Louise Luster (Executive producer); Seth Randal
- Narrated by: Claudia Weathermon
- Cinematography: Craig Franson; Jay Krajic; Brian Nelson
- Edited by: Jenessa Carson
- Music by: Randall Coryell
- Production company: Entendre Pictures
- Distributed by: Frameline
- Release date: June 10, 2006
- Running time: 82 minutes
- Country: United States
- Language: English
- Budget: US$40,000—50,000

The Fall of '55 (2006) is a documentary film about the Boise homosexuality scandal, a witch-hunt targeted at homosexuals in 1955 that resulted in a number of arrests and prison terms ranging anywhere from six months to life in prison.

The scandal began October 31, 1955 when a number of prominent Boise men were persecuted for alleged homosexual acts. The film covers the same subject matter as John Gerassi's book The Boys of Boise (1966), although Seth Randal, the film's writer, director, and producer, says he completed five years of independent research on the topic.

Some accounts of the incident claim that nearly 1,000 boys were seduced by a "ring" of men. A 1955 TIME magazine article said "Boiseans were shocked to learn that their city had sheltered a widespread homosexual underworld that involved some of Boise's most prominent men and had preyed on hundreds of teen-age boys for the past decade".

The film is narrated by former Boise television anchor Claudia Weathermon. The film premiered on 10 June 2006 at Newfest in New York City, at the Idaho International Film Festival at Boise's Egyptian Theater on 30 September 2006, and at the Spokane International Film Festival on 4 February 2007.
