= Boise homosexuality scandal =

Sex scandal in the United States

Boise residents read of the first arrests, igniting a moral panic in the town.

The Boise homosexuality scandal refers to a sweeping investigation of a supposed "homosexual underground" in Boise, Idaho that started in 1955. Beginning with the arrest of three men in October 1955, the investigation broadened to encompass allegations that more than 100 young men and teenage boys had been involved in sexual acts with a ring of adult homosexual men. By the time the investigation wound down in January 1957, some 1,500 people had been questioned, sixteen men faced charges, and fifteen of them were sentenced to terms ranging from probation to life in prison.

Reportage of the investigation and arrests set off a moral panic in Boise, fueled by incendiary editorials in the city's newspaper. Although framed in terms of "protecting children" from adult predators, the probe was not confined to investigating charges of men having sex with underage boys and some of those convicted and sentenced to prison were found guilty only of sexual encounters with other consenting adults. The scandal highlighted the tension between the perception of homosexuality as a mental illness requiring treatment and homosexual sex as a criminal act mandating punishment and led to an examination of the problems of juvenile delinquency.

The reasons behind both the start and the end of the investigation are unclear. In his book on the scandal, The Boys of Boise: Furor, Vice and Folly in an American City, journalist and academician John Gerassi suggests that the investigation began as a means for the wealthy elite of Boise to assert and maintain economic control of the city and the state. He asserts that a gay millionaire known as "The Queen" was the target of the probe, although he was never charged. With the son of the loudest proponent of the investigation implicated, Gerassi suggests that the forces behind the probe realized that homosexuals were at every level of society and that their wealth and power would not necessarily insulate them, leading them to quietly halt the investigation.

D'Emilio and Freedman, who are historians of sexuality, situate the Boise investigations within national Cold War politics that led to a national obsession with homosexuality across the US.

== Investigation and first arrests ==
The first arrests in the scandal came on October 31, 1955, following an investigation by private detective Howard Dice at the behest of an unnamed client. Those arrested were Ralph Cooper, a 33-year-old shoe repairman; Charles Brokaw, a 29-year-old freight worker; and Vernon Cassel, a 51-year-old store clerk. Cooper and Brokaw were charged with "lewd conduct with a minor child" (Cooper based on an incident from June 1954) and Cassel with "infamous crimes against nature", in other words, sodomy. When the arrests were announced, Ada County Probation Officer Emery Bess stated, without offering supporting evidence, that the investigation had only "scratched the surface" of "child molestation activities" in Boise involving several adults and over 100 teenagers.

According to Jim Brandon, at the time the chief of the Boise Police Department, the investigation began when the local YMCA became concerned about the number of transients who were staying at the facility and possible sexual improprieties. Dice's "unnamed client", a lawyer connected with the YMCA and who was connected to the power elite of Boise, hired Dice to investigate. Dice initially discovered nothing, then began speaking with some youths who told him about "juvenile delinquents" who congregated at the YMCA and who engaged in homosexual acts with adult men. With the involvement of underage males, probation officer Bess became involved and, according to Brandon, compiled a list of 75 youths supposedly involved in homosexual activity. Bess refused to turn over the list to the police or the prosecutor and Dice, operating under the direction of a local organization, the Allied Civic Group, continued the investigation that led to the three initial arrests.

The reasons behind the investigation are murky and complex. Gerassi asserts that a "power elite" in Boise, whom he refers to as the "Boise gang", sought to use the investigation (and the resulting scandal) as a means of maintaining control over the city of Boise and, by extension, the entire state of Idaho. He suggests that different members of this elite sought to aim the investigation at different targets. The editor of the Idaho Statesman, Jim Brown, and others wanted to undermine the current reform-minded mayor and his administration. Others targeted the Boise City Council, specifically Councilman Harold T. "Buck" Jones, (Note: Gerassi identified Buck with the pseudonym "Henry Morton" in 1966. In his 2001 introduction, Gerassi revealed Buck's identity because Buck was dead (Gerassi, p. xx).) whose son, Frank, (Note: Gerassi identified Frank with the pseudonym "Jim Morton" in 1966. In his 2001 introduction, Gerassi revealed not only Frank's identity, but also that Frank had committed suicide in 1982 (Gerassi, p. xxi).) was one of the youths involved in the scandal. Still other "Boise gang" members were after a fellow member, a wealthy homosexual known as "The Queen", who they believed was too powerful to be brought down by any other means. It is equally unclear what triggered the investigation. According to attorney J. Charles Blanton, who had worked in the County Prosecutor's office until September 1955 and who represented Cassel, the office did not routinely search for homosexual activity to prosecute. Between early September and late October, something unknown happened that caused the heightened pursuit leading to the three initial arrests.

== "Crush the Monster" ==
The Idaho Statesman, Boise's only daily newspaper, reported the arrests on November 2. News of the arrests ignited a panic in the citizens of Boise. In particular, mothers called the high school, the police and each other, turning in the names of suspected "perverts" and feeding their own and each other's fear. On November 3, the paper ran an editorial under the headline "Crush the Monster". In it, the editors called homosexuality everything from "moral perversion" to a "cancerous growth... calling for immediate and systematic cauterization". The Statesman then called for "the whole sordid situation" to be "completely cleared up, and the premises thoroughly cleaned and disinfected" using "the full strength of county and city agencies". The editorial increased the panic among Boise citizens, who decided that if the normally-staid Statesman was so alarmed at the situation then there must be good reason to be alarmed.

The panic increased anew with the announcement of the arrest of Joe Moore. Moore, then the vice-president of the Idaho First National Bank, was arrested for an "infamous crime against nature" committed with Lee Gibson, a 15-year-old boy who had also been the complaining witness against Cooper. With his arrest, the Statesman published another inflammatory editorial under the headline "This Mess Must Be Removed". The editors characterized homosexuals as a "scourge" that "ravage our youth", lamenting the "number of boys [who] have been victimized by these perverts". Claiming that those so "victimized" would "grow into manhood with the same inclinations of those who are called homosexuals", the Statesman concluded, "No matter what is required, this sordid mess must be removed from this community." Anonymous calls to the police turning in the names of any man who in the opinion of an observer seemed to pay too much attention to any young male flooded in and the city's gay residents realized that a witch hunt was in full swing. One man, a teacher, was so terrified upon reading of Moore's arrest over breakfast that he abandoned the city for San Francisco without informing the school or even finishing his eggs.

With Boiseans terrified of the "monster" in their midst and Ralph Cooper sentenced to life in prison, the Statesman abruptly reversed itself. In a November 20 editorial, the newspaper called for "shock and disgust" to be "replaced with calm and calculated analysis and consideration". Noting that homosexuality existed in every community and had existed "as long as the weaknesses of the human mind have been evident", the Statesman declared that homosexuals were not criminals and that incarceration was not an appropriate solution. It claimed that as long as the focus was on punishing the adult homosexual, then the involved boys, who had been "infected" by the adult men in the same way that the men had themselves been "infected" as children, would "travel the same path and carry the identical threat to the next generation of youth". The paper concluded that homosexuals should still be pursued "before they do more damage to youth", but with a goal of psychiatric treatment rather than imprisonment, and that plans for assistance to the boys must be made immediately "in order that they do not grow into manhood to become homosexuals". The editorial did nothing to abate the panic and the investigation continued.

== National news coverage ==
On December 12, 1955, Time magazine published an article called "Idaho Underworld" in which it recounted the initial arrests and convictions and claimed that a "widespread homosexual underground" had "preyed on hundreds of teen-age boys for the past decade". Time followed up on January 2, 1956, reporting additional arrests and sentencing and the suggestion from Boise psychiatrist John L. Butler, who had been appointed director of the Idaho Department of Mental Health in December 1955, that rather than sentencing the homosexual adults to prison terms, the state should instead "build up community supports for them... One alternative might be to let them form their own society and be left alone."

On December 22, 1955, the Boise city council issued a statement in which it announced the hiring of a new private investigator to take over the investigation, William Fairchild. (Note: Because the investigator was still operating in an undercover capacity in 1965, Gerassi assigned him the pseudonym "Bill Goodman".) Fairchild was known for his work investigating homosexuals employed by the State Department; the city, the county and the prosecutor's office jointly paid for his services. Fairchild expanded the investigation and quickly developed a list of 500 suspected homosexuals.

== The boys ==
When news of the arrests broke, Probation Officer Emery Bess claimed that close to 100 underage boys had been involved in sexual activity with adult men. Gerassi interviewed 28 men who had been enrolled in Boise High School during the scandal. They all disputed the notion that 100 underage boys were involved with adult men. Psychiatrist Butler agreed, stating his belief that only 65 boys were involved in any same-sex sexual activity, including mutual masturbation. There were only four or five boys whose sexual involvement with adults went as far as oral-genital contact. These boys were characterized by Butler as "tough gang members", who engaged in prostitution, making $5–$10 each time they engaged in sex, and blackmail, threatening to expose the men to the police if they refused to pay.

On December 15, 1955, three days after Time broke the story and in the wake of closing arguments in the sentencing hearing of Joe Moore, Boise residents held a meeting to discuss the problems of homosexuality and juvenile delinquency. Speakers included psychiatrist Butler; L. E. Clapp, the warden of the state penitentiary; Jim Fowler, the counselor from the local junior high school; and Boise lawyer Frank Church (who would go on to the United States Senate in 1957). The meeting, featuring contradictory remarks from the various speakers on the nature of homosexuality and the role of parents in the lives of their children in preventing delinquency, angered many in the community who felt that Butler in particular, whom they viewed as an outsider despite his roots in the city, was casting aspersions on their ability as parents and calling for government interference in the lives of their families.

One boy who was particularly affected by the scandal was Frank Anton Jones. Frank was the son of Boise city council member and strong investigation proponent Harold T. "Buck" Jones. Frank was named in a statement given to Blaine Evans by Melvin Dir, an actor and director who had left Boise for San Francisco in the early days of the investigation, in January 1956. Dir stated that he had engaged in mutual oral-genital contact with Frank once in the summer of 1953, when Frank was 14. Frank was in 1956 a cadet at West Point. Sheriff D. C. House flew out to retrieve Frank, who was separated from the academy. Frank was not tried for the relationship. Dir initially pleaded not guilty, then later switched to a guilty plea and was sentenced to probation. Frank's father Harold maintained that sending the sheriff after his son was "a political witch hunt... There were other names, big shots, involved—one very big name. But nothing happened to them."

== End of the investigation ==
The end of the investigation was perhaps as murky as its beginning. On December 29, 1955, William Harvey Baker admitted shooting and killing his father. Baker was convicted of manslaughter in June 1956 and sentenced to ten years in prison. Baker was a key prosecution witness against Moore and other defendants and his involvement in the shooting was one factor which seemed to shift public opinion regarding the witch-hunt. If Baker could kill his father, some of the public reasoned, his credibility as a witness was compromised.

Others in the community were embarrassed by the publicity and attention focused on Boise by the Time article. As a defense attorney later put it, "[I]t was as if there was a general feeling that the cases had gone far enough. Not only the court but the people of Boise felt this — I think."

Gerassi marks the sentencing of Melvin Dir on January 21, 1957, following a probation violation as the conclusion of the scandal. Along with the public unease over the Baker incident and the embarrassment of the Time publicity, Gerassi suggests that the crackdown was getting too close to people entrenched within the same power elite that had pushed the investigation in the first place. Boise police sergeant Don Jerome, speaking several years after the wind-down, concurred in this assessment. "The 1955–1956 scandal boomeranged. Too many people were hurt. The city's reputation was too drastically damaged." However, some of the men convicted in the crackdown dispute this interpretation. One stated, "The real big shots I knew as homosexuals never were arrested." Another agreed: "And they knew who that millionaire 'Queen' was. They knew all about him before they picked me up, because they asked me about him. And... I confirmed it." By the end of the investigation, 1,472 people had been interviewed.

== Arrests and convictions ==
| Defendant | Arrested | Charge | Result | Sentence |
|---|---|---|---|---|
| John Calvin Bartlett | December 11, 1955 | Infamous crimes against nature | Pleaded guilty | Six years of probation. |
| Charles Brokaw | October 31, 1955 | Lewd conduct with a minor | Pleaded guilty | Six months in prison plus probation. |
| Vernon Cassel | October 31, 1955 | Infamous crimes against nature | Pleaded guilty | Ten years in prison |
| Ralph Cooper | October 31, 1955 | Lewd conduct with a minor | Pleaded guilty | Life imprisonment. Served nine years. |
| Melvin Dir | January 7, 1956 | Lewd conduct with a minor | Pleaded guilty | Five years in prison, suspended. Later violates probation and is sentenced to seven years. |
| Charles Herbert Gordon | December 11, 1955 | Lewd and lascivious conduct | Pleaded guilty | 15 years in prison |
| Gordon Larsen | December 11, 1955 | Infamous crimes against nature | Tried, found guilty | Five years in prison |
| Paris Martin (Note: Martin is identified by the pseudonym "Mark Rome" in Gerassi's book.) | December 11, 1955 | Infamous crimes against nature | Tried, found not guilty | None |
| Joe Moore | November 14, 1955 | Infamous crimes against nature | Pleaded guilty | Seven years in prison. Loses appeal to the Idaho Supreme Court. |
| Charles Pruett | December 11, 1955 | Infamous crimes against nature | Pleaded guilty | Five years in prison |
| Reginald Shaffer | December 11, 1955 | Infamous crimes against nature | Pleaded guilty | 15 years in prison |
| Willard Wilson | December 11, 1955 | Infamous crimes against nature | Pleaded guilty | Five years in prison. Loses appeal to the Idaho Supreme Court. |

Four more men pleaded guilty to infamous crimes against nature and received probation. Gerassi does not identify these men by name in his book, stating that although they were convicted, they were sentenced to probation "and were therefore capable of establishing new lives without the stamp of ex-con, and perhaps without their convictions disclosed." Martin, Larsen and two others were charged only with contacts with adults 18 and older.

== Invasion of privacy lawsuit ==
In 1995, the 40th anniversary of the start of the scandal, The Idaho Statesman printed an account of the scandal that included a photograph of a statement written by Melvin Dir in which Dir claimed to have had a sexual affair with a cousin. The cousin was Fred Uranga, although he was not identified in the story. Uranga sued for invasion of privacy. The trial court dismissed the suit, citing the First Amendment rights of the newspaper, and the appellate court upheld the dismissal. The Idaho Supreme Court reinstated the suit but eight months later reversed itself and unanimously dismissed it. Uranga appealed to the United States Supreme Court, which in 2003 declined his appeal without comment.

== Media coverage ==
The most comprehensive account of the scandal written to date is The Boys of Boise, a 1966 book by John Gerassi. Gerassi uses the language of the day regarding homosexuality, which at the time was considered a mental illness. (Note: The American Psychiatric Association removed homosexuality from its diagnostic manual in 1973 (Hogan and Hudson, p. 647).) Gerassi deplored how the cases of those homosexuals who were "unchangeable" and only "broke the law" with other adults were handled while calling those who had had sexual contact with teenagers child molesters who were "sick and should have been treated". When his book was republished in 2001, Gerassi wrote in the introduction that his tone was "a bit too superior." He said no reviewer had criticized him for "sharing the common assumptions of the day." He took credit for getting the last remaining incarcerated man released from prison.

CBS Reports: The Homosexuals, a 1967 documentary and the first nationally broadcast program on homosexuality in America, includes a segment on the scandal. Producer Harry Morgan said that the case "illustrates the fact that homosexuality cannot be stamped out; that it is everywhere, not just in the big cities. Society must be made aware of the realities of homosexuality in order to evolve more educated means for dealing with the problem." The Fall of '55, a 2006 film written, directed and produced by Seth Randal, recounts the story, as does Boise U.S.A., a stage play written by Gene Franklin Smith and produced in 2008 by the Salem K Theatre Company in Los Angeles, California.

Former Idaho Senator Larry Craig's arrest in 2007 for lewd conduct prompted a brief flurry of attention to the Boise scandal. Craig was ten years old in 1955 and a college student in 1966 when Gerassi's book was released. Fall of '55 director Randal argues that there is little to no chance that Craig was not aware of the Boise scandal and suggests that Craig, in trying to withdraw his guilty plea, had absorbed a lesson from the original scandal: "sexual misconduct — or even the mere perception that one is gay — could ruin a man's reputation. But steadfast, straight-in-the-eye denial just might get him off the hook."

== Cold war politics ==
D'Emilio and Freedman, writing two decades after Gerassi's book, situate the Boise panic about homosexuals within the context of Cold War politics and the changes in family life experienced in the 1950s. They link the Boise investigations to similar witch hunts for homosexuals that occurred in cities and towns across the nation. In the District of Columbia and in Philadelphia, between 1000 and 1200 suspected homosexuals were arrested per year in the early 1950s. Police raids on gay bars in large cities resulted in hundreds of arrests, and newspaper stories about the raids frightened lesbians and gay men into abandoning their homes and fleeing.

D'Emilio and Freedman also discuss how the increasing visibility of gay and lesbian subcultures, particularly in urban areas such as Dallas, Baltimore, New York, Miami, New Orleans, and San Francisco, undermined one of the "props" of Cold War politics: the traditional, heterosexual, nuclear family and its norms of sexuality. Nationally, Americans had become "obsessed" with the alleged "homosexual menace," and its potential threats to American security and morality.

== See also ==
- Lavender scare, with links to articles about other investigations of homosexuals around the country in this period.
- Larry Craig scandal

== Bibliography ==
- D'Emilio, John, and Estelle Freedman. (2012). Intimate Matters: A History of Sexuality in America. (Third edition). University of Chicago Press. ISBN 9780226923802.
- Gerassi, John, with introduction by Peter Boag (1966, reprinted 2001). The Boys of Boise: Furor, Vice and Folly in an American City. University of Washington Press. ISBN 0-295-98167-9.
- Hogan, Steve and Lee Hudson (1998). Completely Queer: The Gay and Lesbian Encyclopedia. New York, Henry Holt and Company. ISBN 0-8050-3629-6.
- Miller, Neil (2002). Sex-crime Panic: A Journey to the Paranoid Heart of the 1950s. Los Angeles, Alyson Books. ISBN 1-55583-659-3.
- The Idaho Statesman original 1950s articles
