= San Francisco Sentinel =

LGBT online newspaper in California

- Type: Online newspaper
- Founded: 1974
- Language: English
- Headquarters: 285 Shipley Street, San Francisco, California
- Country: United States
- Price: free
- OCLC number: 26101396
- Website: www.sanfranciscosentinel.com

The San Francisco Sentinel is an online newspaper serving the LGBTQ communities of the San Francisco Bay Area. Originally a weekly print periodical, the Sentinel covers local San Francisco politics, news and social events, and international news of interest to the gay community.

== Background ==
Several San Francisco newspapers have held the name San Francisco Sentinel. One operated in the 1860s; another was started in 1890 by West-Indies-born Oxford-educated newspaper editor Robert Charles O'Harra Benjamin and his business manager partner L. B. Stephens. This second Sentinel focused on news and opinion of interest to African-American readers.

== Gay community news ==
The modern San Francisco Sentinel began in 1974 as a weekly periodical covering the gay community of San Francisco. It was published by Charles Lee Morris, an activist for gay rights and a local political leader. Morris produced the Sentinel as a weekly periodical paid for by subscriptions and advertisements. It appeared in magazine form with a cover illustration rather than articles in columns on the front. In 1975, Morris hired Randall H. "Randy" Alfred as news editor. Alfred wrote the column "Waves from the Left", and he responded to the first hate crime legislation passing in California by writing, "The days are gone when we can be taken for granted. We are tired of shabby, liberal gestures." Alfred left in 1977 to work for a competing gay newspaper, the San Francisco Bay Times.

In October 1980, the newspaper published a guest editorial written by U.S. presidential candidate John B. Anderson. Anderson wrote that, if elected, he would order the cessation of discrimination in the federal government based on sexual orientation. At the time, the Sentinel boasted a local circulation of 17,000, but the story was picked up by the Associated Press and United Press International wire services and printed in various papers across the country. Publisher Morris said that he thought this was "the first time a major presidential candidate" had written for a gay-oriented newspaper.

Morris moved to Denver in 1984 and died of AIDS in 1986 at the age of 46.

The paper went through several owners, including gay rights activist William "Bill" Beardemphl who bought it in 1981. At the time, Beardemphl was living in Geyserville, California, with his longtime partner John DeLeon. Beardemphl had earlier written a column—"From the Left"—for the Bay Area Reporter, a gay community newspaper founded in 1971 by Bob Ross. Managing Editor Gary Schwiekhart wrote that Beardemphl and Ross, both accomplished chefs, "deeply despised one another, both journalistically and culinarily, and frequently used their newspapers to launch vicious personal attacks" on each other.

Beardemphl hired Jack Nichols as his news editor, and in 1982 brought Alfred back, this time as Editor-in-Chief. Beardemphl refused to use the word gay, preferring homosexual, and he initially thought that the idea of a gay-related immune deficiency disease was a government plot to stop the gay community from having fun. Beardemphl wrote an April Fools' Day editorial in 1982 lampooning the new disease: "Gay Cancer Caused by Brunch". Historian Rodger Streitmatter in Unspeakable: The Rise of the Gay and Lesbian Press in America, writes that this tasteless headline was indicative of the Bay Area gay press's failure to call attention to the epidemic even after it was identified by the Centers for Disease Control and Prevention, though Bobbi Campbell had started a regular column in the Sentinel about AIDS a few months earlier. Beardemphl died of prostate cancer in 2002.

In September 1995, new owner Ray Chalker shut the paper down after trying to keep it afloat for one year.

=== Online news ===
In May 1999, Pat Murphy began publishing The District 6 Sentinel, renamed Sentinel to the San Francisco Sentinel expanding coverage from Supervisorial District 6 to all San Francisco. Murphy's previous website was called "District 6 Sentinel" and was listed as a San Francisco political committee. As a young man, Murphy worked as a cub reporter for the Richmond Independent, the Berkeley Daily Gazette and the San Francisco Chronicle before branching out into editing and advertising.

Murphy has been described as willing to accept money for positive coverage in the Sentinel. In 2005, Supervisor Chris Daly wrote on his official blog that Murphy offered him editorial oversight of articles about Daly, but Daly refused to pay the suggested $1,500. Murphy responded by saying he and his photographer partner, Luke Thomas, do not accept payment for positive coverage. He said the Sentinel makes money from advertising and from sales of photographs.

In September 2006, the Sentinel had gone offline for a brief period during which Thomas left the newspaper after 17 months as co-owner (the co-ownership with Thomas had not been consummated by legal contract) and Editor-in-Chief, writing that he did not wish to follow Murphy's direction in changing the Sentinel into a "pro-business publication". Murphy had removed Thomas' ability to publish immediately following Sentinel publication of a pro-Fidel Castro article about which Thomas neither informed nor consulted Murphy prior to that story's publication. Thomas moved on to found Fog City Journal. Amazon Watch wrote in 2008 that petroleum giant Chevron appeared to be paying Murphy to write positively about Chevron and negatively about its opponents in Ecuador and Nigeria. Amazon Watch described how the Chevron-related posts at the San Francisco Sentinel were Google bombed into much greater prominence than other Sentinel material which ranked very low locally.

On June 6, 2011, SFAppeal.com reported that Thomas hurried left a paid staged political promoting re-election of progressive Mayor Ed Lee: "Michael Petrelis stumbled upon political consultant Enrique Pearce of Left Coast Communications and one of his staffers outside the grocery co-op's 13th Street entrance, where Pearce and Luke Thomas — publisher of news website Fog City Journal and a freelance photographer — were documenting an "apparently homeless" man holding the aforementioned sign begging Ed Lee to run, according to Petrelis's blog. The situation broke up immediately as soon as the filmers realized they were being photographed, according to Petrelis."

In March 2009 while he was "laid low" with emphysema and cirrhosis, Murphy named Sean Martinfield publisher and editor. Murphy continues as owner. As of 2012, Murphy's emphysema remained constant at 30% breathing capacity loss under treatment by San Francisco Dr. Gary Apter. Apter's 2012 evaluation of Murphy's cirrhosis indicated adequate liver enzyme production adequate to continue normal life.

In March 2011, the San Francisco Police Department revoked the press passes of a number of independent online news outlets including the Sentinel. Josh Wolf wrote that the department's policy indicated the passes were for reporters who "regularly cover fires and breaking police news". Sentinel photographer Bill Wilson expressed dismay at losing his pass.

== See also ==
- Bay Area Reporter
- San Francisco Bay Times
- LGBT culture in San Francisco
