= Fernando Gerassi =

Turkish artist (1899–1974)

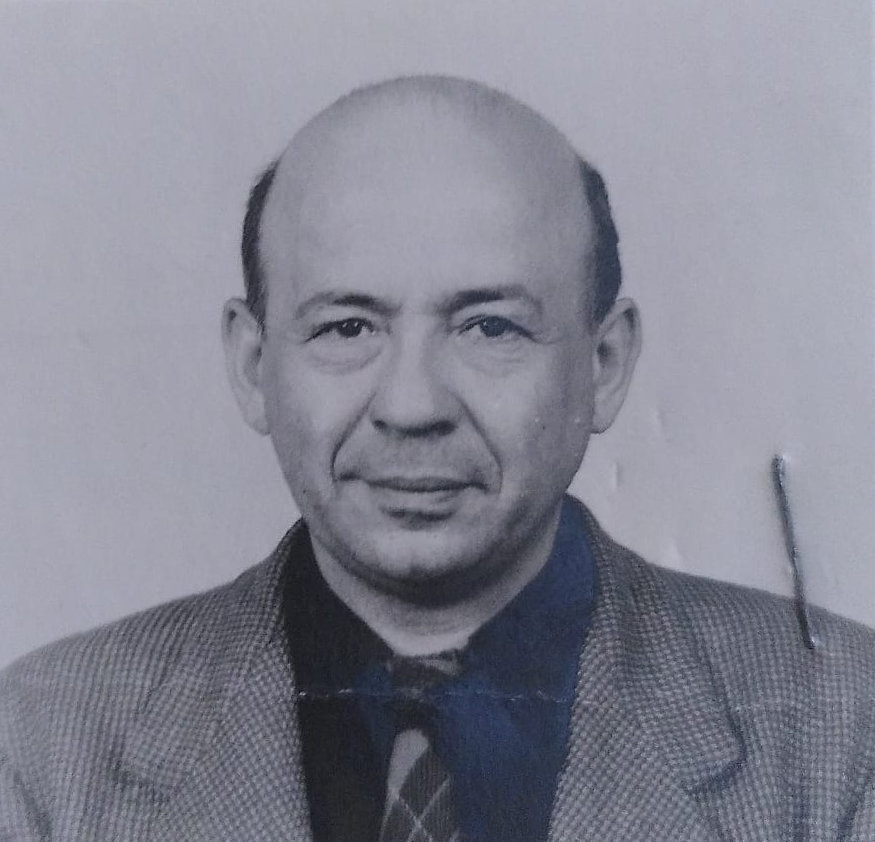
Fernando Gerassi, 1953

Fernando Gerassi (October 5, 1899 – 1974) was a Sephardic Jew born in Turkey. He was an accomplished artist who exhibited alongside Picasso before volunteering to fight in the Spanish Civil War.

== Personal life ==
In 1922 Gerassi met Stephania Avdykovych, a Ukrainian, in Berlin and they were married in 1929. In 1931, their son, John "Tito" Gerassi, was born in Paris.

Gerassi and his family moved to the United States at the start of World War II and he was hired by Carmelita Hinton, a progressive educator who was the founder and director of the Putney School in Vermont, to teach art at the school. Hinton also employed Gerassi's wife, Stepha, to teach "anything she wanted" and she would go on to teach a number of subjects during their years at the school, including French, Spanish, Russian, German, ancient history, Latin, and European history. In 1955 Time magazine reported that to support his family while establishing his art career, he tried "some 40 different jobs". From 1944 to 1964 Gerassi was harassed by the CIA who tried to blackmail him by threatening to deport his family if he would not agree to work for them. One of his friends eventually reported the harassment to Abe Fortas, then an aide to Lyndon Johnson. Fortas obtained the CIA file and passed it onto the United States Attorney General, Robert F. Kennedy, who immediately gave Gerassi and his family American citizenship and apologized "in the name of America".

== Art career ==
Gerassi's early work was influenced by Stanislas Stueckgold and Paul Cézanne.

In 1951 Gerassi shared an exhibit with American artist, Georgia O'Keeffe, and then in 1955 he exhibited alone, for the first time in 20 years. His solo exhibition at the Panoras Gallery in Manhattan "elicited rave reviews".

Gerassi returned to Putney School where he painted until his death in 1974.
