= Mattachine Society of Washington =

Distinct homophile movement of the 1960s

The Mattachine Society of Washington (MSW) was a gay rights organisation founded in August 1961 by Frank Kameny and Jack Nichols. While the organisation was named after the original, California-based Mattachine Society established in 1950, it was distinguished from other Mattachine Societies by its militancy.

== Founders ==
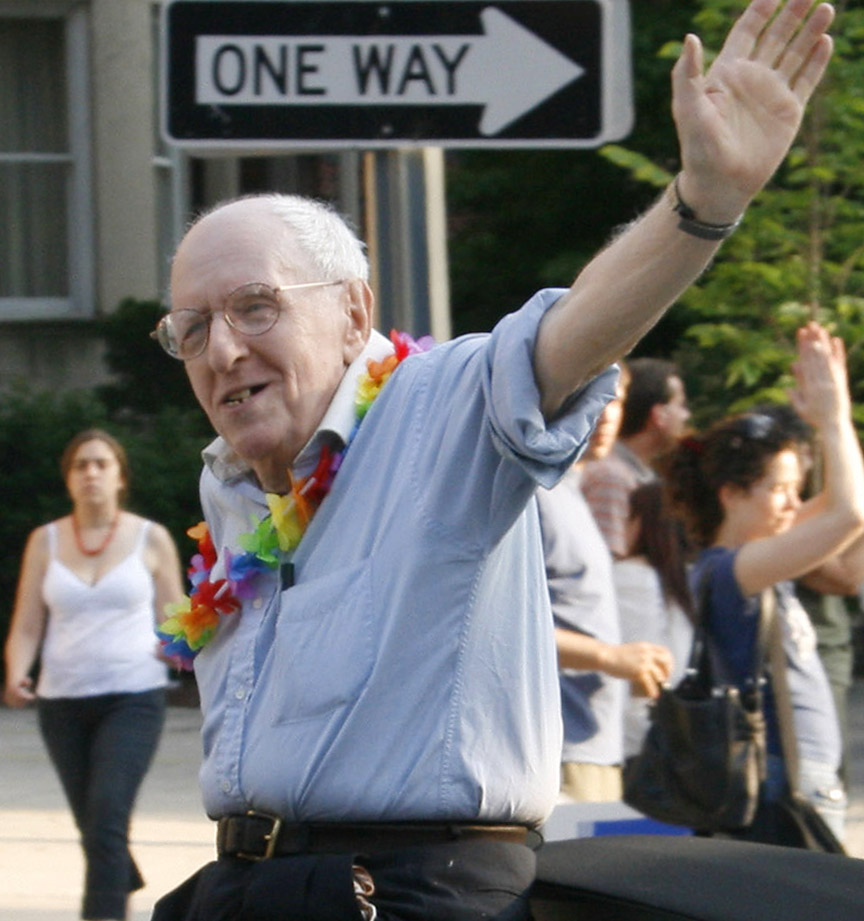
Frank Kameny

=== Frank Kameny ===
Frank Kameny was a gay rights activist who brought a new militancy to the gay rights movement from the late 1950s. Kameny had previously worked as an astronomer for the federal civil service before he was fired for his homosexuality. This experience inspired the militant values which he brought to the MSW.

Kameny's experience with being fired over concealing his homosexuality and a previous run-in with the San Francisco police when he applied for his position combined with the lengths he went to regain his job to no avail led him to try and confront the deeply homophobic prejudices that had entered American society along with the Lavender Scare. Kameny believed that the only way to tackle these prejudices was by tackling them head-on, a philosophy which underpinned the MSW under his presidency. The MSW would become nationally famous for its members picketing for gay rights at various federal sites, including the White House and the Pentagon. Kameny promoted the 'Gay Is Good' slogan while challenging what he viewed as the U.S. governments systematic exclusion of gays and lesbians.

Kameny continued to support and work with gay rights movements throughout the twentieth century. He was asked to sit on the board of directors for the National Gay Task Force in 1973 and worked with groups such as ACT UP and Queer Nation, participating in civil disobedience with them.

=== Jack Nichols ===
Jack Nichols was an American gay rights activist. Nichols co-founded the MSW with Kameny, eventually becoming its vice president. Nichols was key to the MSW as he forcefully argued for Kameny to work with other civil rights groups with 'parallel interests' - for example, other Mattachine Societies. While this troubled Frank and did not prevent the group from maintaining its distinct, militant values, it was a significant contribution from Nichols and reflected his values.

Nichols inconsistently supported the cause in its initial stages but committed to the MSW in January 1963. From this point, he continued to collaborate with Kameny, himself challenging the idea that homosexuality was an illness.

== Values ==
Previous Mattachine Societies had focused on more reserved activism within the deeply heterosexual American culture that they inhabited. This involved a focus on 'education, research and assimilation', rather than more radical activism. Kameny rejected this and attempted to fight what he saw as the cultural foundations of homophobia within America and American politics. Through this, the MSW's philosophy became that of achieving meaningful change, rather than placating what they considered to be a prejudiced culture.

Kameny did not believe that antigay prejudice had any basis in reason and instead blamed emotion. As a result, he did not put much effort into educating or persuading those who opposed him and rather relied upon civil disobedience.

The MSW argued that homosexuality was not an illness but rather an orientation or preference; this was radical at the time given that even some gay rights groups suggested that homosexuality was an illness.

== Actions ==
In order to achieve these values, the MSW participated in various methods of activism.

In the spring and summer of 1965, Kameny and Nichols organised a series of gay pickets outside government buildings in Washington D.C., including outside the white house. Kameny also organised a series of test discrimination cases in the courts.

MSW also protested against the U.S. military ban of gay people in 1965; they picketed outside the Pentagon and covered the building with flyers on "How to Handle a Federal Interrogation".

== Legacy ==
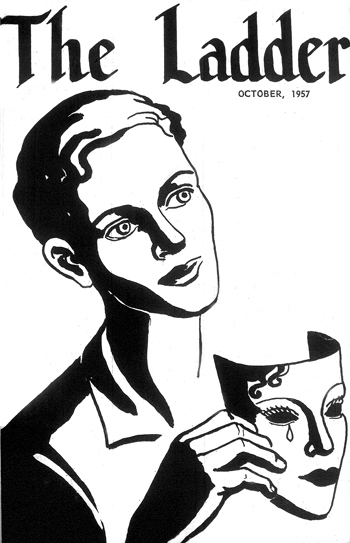
The October 1957 edition of The Ladder, mailed to hundreds of women in the San Francisco area, urged women to take off their masks. The motif of masks and unmasking was prevalent in the homophile era, prefiguring the political strategy of coming out and giving the Mattachine Society its name.

The MSW, alongside the other Mattachine Societies and lesbian civil rights groups such as the Daughters of Bilitis, made up the 1950s and 1960s homophile movement. This movement, partly inspired by the oppression of the Lavender Scare, inspired later LGBT rights movements in the U.S., including the late 1960s/ 1970s lesbian and gay liberation fronts.

A new Mattachine Society of Washington, dedicating themselves to the archival research of LGBT political history, formed in 2011.
