= Helen G. James =

American therapist (born 1927)

- Born: January 30, 1927 (age 99); Scranton, Pennsylvania, U.S.
- Military career
- Allegiance: United States
- Branch: Air Force
- Service years: 1952–1955
- Rank: Airman Second Class
- Other work: Physical Therapist

Helen Grace James (born January 30, 1927) is an American physical therapist and military veteran. She served in the United States Air Force, where she achieved the rank of Airman Second Class. She was discharged from the military as "undesirable" during the Lavender Scare campaign to remove lesbian and gay people from government employment in links with the anti-communist campaign. In 1960, she was able to upgrade her status from "undesirable" to "General Discharge under Honorable Conditions". In 2018, she successfully sued the U.S. Air Force to upgrade her discharge to "honorable,” which allowed her to receive full veteran benefits that were previously unavailable to her.

== Early life ==
Helen Grace James was born in Scranton, Pennsylvania on January 30, 1927. She was heavily inspired by her World War I veteran father, which ultimately led to her joining the United States Air Force at age 25 after concurrently enlisting in the Air Force Reserves.

James also received a Bachelor of Science degree in Health Education at East Stroudsburg State College and taught for several years before enlisting.

== Life and career ==
Helen G. James enlisted in the United States Air Force in 1952. She started as a radio operator and was later promoted to crew chief. Eventually she achieved the rank of Airman Second Class. In 1955, the Office of Special Investigations (OSI) started following and spying on her work and personal life during the Lavender Scare campaign to remove lesbian and gay people from government employment as communism began to increase and become an immediate risk in the United States. They placed James under arrest and began interrogation which lasted hours, threatening to disclose her sexuality to her relations and friends if she did not sign discharge papers from the Air Force. James received "undesirable" discharge from the US Air Force on the 3rd March, 1955. James was also stripped of her commission in the Air Force Reserves in August 1955, with another "undesirable" discharge.

After that, she moved to California, where she got an advanced degree in physical therapy from Stanford University. She has been a physical therapist ever since. From 1972 she was a member of the faculty at California State University, Fresno, until she went into private practice in 1989.

On the 8th April, 1960, she applied to upgrade her status from "undesirable" to "General Discharge under Honorable Conditions." However, the National Personal Records Center notified James that her military records were unable to be retrieved. This change was later made but the newfound status did not allow her to have access to basic services other veterans could receive, such as healthcare or banking benefits from the USAA. In 2018 she successfully sued the US Air Force to change her status to “honorable”, making her eligible for all veterans benefits, including access to healthcare from the U.S. Department of Veterans Affairs and burial in a national cemetery.

In January 2018, she decided to donate her album of photographs to the Smithsonian, to be featured in the National Air and Space Museum.
