= The Rejected =

- Dr. Karl Bowman explains the Kinsey scale in The Rejected. Bowman, a psychiatrist, disputed the notion that homosexuality was an illness and supported legal reforms.
- Directed by: Richard Christian
- Narrated by: James Day
- Country of origin: United States

Production
- Producer: John W. Reavis
- Running time: 60 min.
- Production company: KQED

Original release
- Network: KQED
- Release: September 11, 1961

The Rejected is a made-for-television documentary film about homosexuality, produced for KQED in San Francisco by John W. Reavis. Notable as the first documentary program on homosexuality broadcast on American television, KQED first aired the film on September 11, 1961. Later syndicated to National Educational Television (NET) stations across the United States, it received positive critical reviews.

== Production ==
Reavis, an independent producer who was apparently unconnected to the homophile movement, wrote up his idea for The Rejected in 1960. Reavis originally titled the documentary The Gay Ones. He explained his goals for the program in his proposal:

The object of the program will be to present as objective analysis of the subject as possible, without being overly clinical. The questions will be basic ones: who are the gay ones, how did they become gay, how do they live in a heterosexual society, what treatment is there by medicine or psychotherapy, how are they treated by society, and how would they like to be treated?

Thus, Reavis approached the topic from the standpoint of homosexuality being a social problem akin to alcoholism or prostitution. This echoed how many earlier programs, often produced as episodes of local talk shows, addressed homosexuality with shows bearing such titles as "Homosexuals and the Problems They Present" and "Homosexuality: A Psychological Approach". The Rejected focused exclusively on gay men, with no representation of lesbians. Reavis expressed his reluctance to include lesbians in his proposal:

First, the repugnance — or desire not to think about the problem — is even greater in society than that towards the problem of Gay men. Second, the number of persons involved is much smaller.... Third, the problems are vastly different, as are the solutions. For example, promiscuity is much less, relationships apt to be bilateral, economic and social sanctions are less, and the ability to carry on a relationship of this sort is greatly simplified.

Commercial stations turned down the program, as did sponsors. KQED bought the project in early 1961 under the new title. The documentary was shot entirely in the KQED studio except for one segment on location at the Black Cat Bar, a San Francisco gay bar that had been fighting state and police harassment since 1948. Reavis and co-producer Irving Saraf filmed The Rejected on a budget of less than $100.

Reavis and director Richard Christian utilized the talk show format, breaking down the subject matter into a series of smaller topics. Each segment included one or more subject matter experts discussing homosexuality from a different perspective. Within each segment, Reavis presented a stereotype about homosexuality and then challenged the validity of that stereotype through the expert interviews. His goal, as he noted in his original proposal, was to give the viewer "a feeling he is confused and that society as a whole is confused about homosexuality". Experts interviewed for the program included:

- Margaret Mead speaking from an anthropological standpoint. Mead spoke of the positive roles that homosexuality had played in the cultures of Ancient Greece and the South Sea Islands and in Inuit and Native American societies. She noted that it is society and not the individual that determines how homosexuality and homosexual behaviour are viewed.
- Psychiatrist Karl Bowman of the Langley Porter Psychiatric Institute, who explained the Kinsey scale of human sexuality and who spoke against a punitive approach to treating homosexual patients. Medical doctor Erwin Braff also addressed medical issues.
- Episcopal Bishop of San Francisco James Pike and rabbi Alvin Fine addressed religious topics. Each man espoused his belief that sodomy laws should be repealed because in his opinion homosexuality was a mental illness. Pike specifically compared homosexuality to chronic alcoholism, but called for homosexuals to be treated with "love and concern and interest" and for not condemning them as "evil".
- The city's district attorney, Thomas C. Lynch, covered legal issues along with lawyers J. Albert Hutchinson, Al Bendich, and Morris Lowenthal (who had previously defended the Black Cat Bar during its 15-year legal battle against police and government harassment).
- Openly gay Mattachine Society president Hal Call, Mattachine executive secretary Donald Lucas and Mattachine treasurer Les Fisher spoke for gay men. The Rejected was unusual for its time in that it included actual gay people as opposed to only presenting ostensibly heterosexual experts.

KQED station manager James Day opened the documentary by reading a statement from California's then-Attorney General Stanley Mosk:

With all the revulsion that some people feel toward homosexuality, it cannot be dismissed by simply ignoring its presence. It is a subject that deserves discussion. We might just as well refuse to discuss alcoholism or narcotics addiction as to refuse to discuss this subject. It cannot be swept under the rug. It will not just go away.

== Critical and popular response ==
The Rejected was critically and popularly well-received upon its initial airing. Variety described it as handling the topic in a "matter-of-fact down-the-middle manner, covering it quite thoroughly and, for the most part, interestingly". Terrence O'Flaherty, critic for the San Francisco Chronicle, concurred, praising KQED for its courage in addressing the subject matter, as did the San Francisco Examiner, which said the program "handled [the topic] soberly, calmly and in great depth". Of the letters KQED received, which numbered in the hundreds, 97% were positive and many of the writers encouraged the station to make more programs like it. Dorian Book Service of San Francisco published a transcript of The Rejected, and close to 400 people ordered copies. KQED syndicated The Rejected to NET channels across the country; it aired on as many of 40 of the 55 NET stations and was repeated on educational stations in 1963 and 1964. Conservative members of the gay community were pleased with how the Mattachine members presented themselves as ordinary people, an image that differed from the perception held by many outside the community. Some more radical activists, including Frank Kameny and Randy Wicker, found the program wanting for the apologetic tone it took toward homosexuality.

In 2002, the Gay & Lesbian Alliance Against Defamation presented KQED with the first Pioneer Award, in recognition of its production of The Rejected as the beginning of a long history of LGBT-related programming.

== Availability ==
KQED, after airing The Rejected, did not archive a hard copy of the documentary, and for many years, the full documentary was considered lost, with only transcripts available. Robert Chehoski, an archivist for KQED, and Alex Cherian, an archivist for the J. Paul Leonard Library at San Francisco State University, searched for any remaining hard copy for up to six years. Eventually, the two found that the film was owned by WNET, which funded the film, and a single 2-inch quad videotape was archived in the Library of Congress. The Library's Recording Laboratory had already remastered the film onto a digital format and provided the San Francisco Bay Area Television Archive with a copy, for the purpose of making it available online. The 60-minute film was released by the TV Archive online on May 22, 2015.

The co-producer of the film, Irving Saraf, also alluded to 30 extra minutes of unaired footage, including content filmed in the Black Cat Bar. This extra footage has not been recovered. Production correspondence written from March to July 1961 between KQED's Program Manager Jonathan Rice and NET's Director of TV Programming Donley F. Feddersen refer to scenes featuring the bar and its owner Sol Stouman that had been shot but were probably going to be cut from the final edit. These documents were preserved by the Wisconsin Historical Society.

== See also ==
- Lists of American television episodes with LGBT themes
- "The Homosexuals" (CBS Reports) (1967)
