= Lige Clarke =

American activist (1942–1975)

- Clarke in 1972
- Born: Elijah Haydn Clarke; February 22, 1942; Knott County, Kentucky, U.S.
- Died: February 10, 1975 (aged 32); Veracruz, Mexico
- Cause of death: Shot to death
- Education: Eastern Kentucky University
- Occupations: Activist; author; journalist
- Partner: Jack Nichols

Elijah Hadyn "Lige" Clarke (February 22, 1942 − February 10, 1975) was an American activist, journalist and author. He was the author of two books with his lover, Jack Nichols.

Clarke's early involvement in Stonewall and the first gay pride parade cemented him as an early proponent of the 1970s American LGBT movement. This, along with his handsome looks and well-known status, made him seemingly "the perfect cover boy" for the gay community at the time.

== Early life ==
Elijah Haydn Clarke was born on February 22, 1942, in Knott County, Kentucky, the third child born to James Bramlette Clarke and Corinne Hicks Clarke. Clarke had two siblings: his sister, Shelbiana Clarke, and his brother, George Clarke, who was at one point mayor of Hindman.

His family was of high social standing in the town, and were also well off economically. His grandfather, George Clarke, had founded both a Methodist church in Hindman and the Hindman Settlement School. His mother wrote for the town's local paper, and his father owned the Main Street grocery store.

He grew up in Cave Branch, an unincorporated community in Knott County, Kentucky, just outside of the town of Hindman, where he grew up and attended school. Clarke attended Knott County High School. During his teenage years, Clarke would pursue acting at Barter Theatre, in Abingdon, Virginia.

Clarke attended Alice Lloyd College before graduating from Eastern Kentucky University. He later left Kentucky and joined the United States Army.

== Career ==
By the early 1960s, Clarke worked for the United States Department of Defense in Washington, D.C. in the office of the Army Chief of Staff. He worked within the Pentagon, with nine separate top-level security clearances. His position had allowed him to spread pamphlets regarding gay rights during his time in the army.

The access and influence from his position would aid the efforts of Jack Nichols and the Mattachine Society, which Clarke had joined after the Lavender Scare, to pressure government legislature concerned with gay rights. Clarke and Nichols created new chapters of the Mattachine Society by producing the East Coast Homophile Organization (ECHO). The Mattachine Society was the first gay liberation organization in the United States. Clarke became a leader of the group's New York and Washington, DC chapters. Clarke helped to organize the first gay rights picket line outside of the White House in 1965, he even hand lettered the protest signs himself. Some of which read "Gay is good!", which in the mid-1960s became a sort of rallying cry to combat both the guilt and shame heaped on gay people by the larger society.

Clarke and Nichols created and wrote "The Homosexual Citizen" as a continuation to their original column written for The Mattachine Review beginning around 1965. It was published in Screw magazine. It was the first regular LGBTQ-interest column printed in a non-LGBTQ publication and hosted the first use of the term "homophobia" in a printed work (Clarke and Nichols cited the term in 1969, but it was first coined in 1965 by psychologist George Weinberg). By 1972 they edited Gay (which was affiliated with Screw), the first weekly national homosexual newspaper.

Clarke and Nichols authored two books about same-sex attraction.

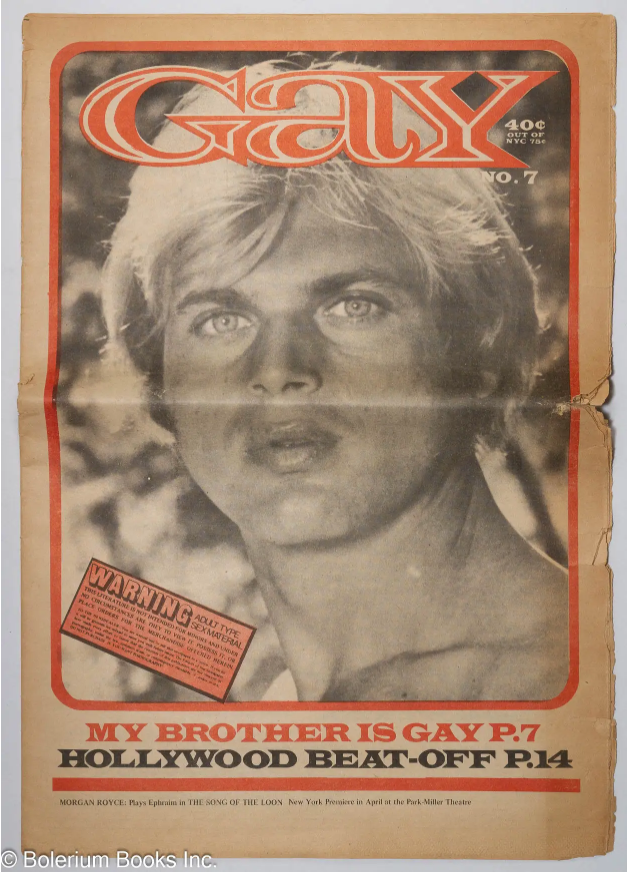
Gay: vol. 1, #7, March 1, 1970: My Brother Is Gay

== Gay newspaper ==
In 1972, Clarke and Nichols took the lead of Gay, one of the first weekly newspapers in the nation dedicated to homosexual news and issues. Gay was America's first national LGBTQ newspaper, that was originally founded in 1969 at the tail end of the Stonewall Riot. Gay was affiliated with Screw magazine, a pornographic newspaper. Clarke also used this platform to claim that, "the homosexual revolution is only part of a larger revolution, sweeping through all segments of society." Gay also sought to provide in-depth reporting and commentary for the LGBTQ community.

Gay was the first weekly newspaper in the U.S. to cover politics and culture from a gay perspective. The newspaper featured a diverse range of content, including contributions from prominent activists and writers. It covered significant events, such as the rise of the Gay Activists Alliance, and explored issues of identity, relationships, and societal challenges relevant to LGBTQ individuals.

Gay sought to reach a broad audience within the LGBTQ community. This readership growth demonstrated the increasing demand for LGBTQ-focused media.

The newspaper also documented the growing gay rights movement, providing a platform for diverse voices and perspectives. It reported on discrimination against LGBTQ people and covered controversial topics relevant to the community.

Clarke and Nichols, through their leadership, created a publication that contributed to the expanding landscape of LGBTQ media. Gay was one of the early publications to specifically address the LGBTQ community, paving the way for future publications. Gay became the most profitable gay newspaper in the country.

== Activism ==
Much of Clarke's activism was based on the East Coast; however, his work led to systemic change that shaped the lives and rights of LGBTQ+ people in the mountains of Eastern Kentucky, the Commonwealth, and across the country. To honor and celebrate his life and work, the Lige Clark Liberation Fund was created with Clarke's family, including artist Eric Rhein.

In the 1950s, Senator Joseph McCarthy inflicted mass fear and paranoia about gangs of gays taking over the American government from within - also known as the Lavender Scare. This led to mass firings of gays and lesbians from government jobs. This prompted Clarke and his network to take action.

Despite taking some of the most significant risks among his protesting peers, Clarke was often accused by others of not being serious enough about his activism. This discontent with the early queer movements held for Clarke was rooted in their lack of understanding of his Appalachian upbringing. Clarke's queer identity and his overall persona were widely influenced by his Appalachian roots. He often rejected the idea of marriage and had concerns for his cohorts' incessant pursuit of equality. For Clarke, liberation for queer folks would come only when society in general became sexually liberated. Discounting labels and cornering when asked what his sexual preference was, Clarke would respond with, "My preference is for Jack Nichols".

Through his understanding of the society around him and his patience for progress, Clarke was able to speak and write emphatically about both social and political developments within the queer community. In his book, I Have More Fun with You Than Anybody, co-authored by his partner, Jack Nichols, Clarke and Nichols allude to the inefficiency of extremism. From either or any side of a battle: "Right-wingers, we know, are only slightly more demented than left-wingers."

== Personal life and death ==
Clarke met Jack Nichols in 1964 in Washington, D.C. at a local gay bar named "The Hideaway." They soon became lovers. However, their relationship experienced a bit of turmoil, and the two had a break in mid-1967, when an exasperated Clarke walked out on the "first and only man" he had ever loved. This was due to Jack's deepening political focus on helping to "save the world" instead of savoring and spending time in the relationship that they shared. Furthermore, they also had different ideas of what their relationship should look like. Nichols wanted his relationship with Clarke to mirror that of heterosexual relationships with Nichols being the more "masculine," "head of the house" and with Clarke being the more "feminine" partner. Clarke rejected conforming to these traditional relationship ideals. However, the two reunited and remained together until Clarke's death. Clarke did not fully come out to most members of his family. The only exception was his sister, Shelbiana, to whom he was extremely close. Even then, he waited until 1970, to make it known to her, even though she had her suspicions.

Clarke and Nichols published a memoir about their lives together, which is titled I Have More Fun with You Than Anybody, in 1972. Whenever Clarke was not writing he was teaching Hatha Yoga in Manhattan and read poetry written by Walt Whitman. His sister, Shelbianna Rhein, described him as "everyone's favorite"; he was especially loved by his mother, nieces, and nephews. Clarke's upbringing in Appalachia was said, by his sister, to be a massive influence on his creative, free spirit. Shelbianna said, "Despite the lack of museums, dance studios, and other advantages children on the outside of the mountains enjoyed, we grew up in a nurturing environment with a rich culture of mountain ballads, art, simple values, and people who cared about each other."

Clarke and Nichols wrote their second book together entitled, Roommates Can't Always Be Lovers: An Intimate Guide to Male-Male Relationships". This book contained samplings of letters sent to them in the capacities as columnists for both Screw and editors of Gay, and their answers. The book was written to make the gay community more approachable to readers.

On February 10, 1975, Clarke was shot and killed in Mexico while traveling with a friend, Charlie Black. While driving near Veracruz, the two were pursued by four men on two motorcycles, the pillion riders armed with machine guns. Clarke died of multiple chest wounds; Black was only wounded.

With the help of Carl Perkins, a former U.S. Representative from Hindman, Clarke's father was able to have his remains airlifted home. Clarke's funeral was held at the family church, with Jack Nichols in attendance.

== Selected works ==
- Clarke, Lige; Nichols, Jack (1972). I Have More Fun With You Than Anybody. New York: St Martin's Press. ISBN 9780900997907. OCLC 993400702.
- Clarke, Lige; Nichols, Jack (1974). Roommates Can't Always Be Lovers: An Intimate Guide to Male-Male Relationships. New York: St. Martin's Press. OCLC 1054028.
