= Jack Nichols (activist) =

American gay rights activist (1938–2005)

- Jack Nichols in CBS Reports: The Homosexuals (1967)
- Born: John Richard Nichols; March 16, 1938; Washington, D.C., US
- Died: May 2, 2005 (aged 67); Cocoa Beach, Florida, US
- Other name: Warren Adkins
- Occupations: Journalist; LGBT rights activist
- Known for: Mattachine Society

John Richard "Jack" Nichols Jr. (March 16, 1938 – May 2, 2005) was an American gay rights activist. He co-founded the Washington, D.C., branch of the Mattachine Society in 1961 with Franklin E. Kameny. He appeared in the 1967 CBS documentary, CBS Reports: The Homosexuals, under the pseudonym Warren Adkins.

== Biography ==
Nichols was born on March 16, 1938, in Washington, D.C. His father was an FBI agent. Nichols was raised in Chevy Chase, Maryland, and came out as gay to his parents as a teenager. His parents divorced, and his mother was subsequently married to William B. Southwick, an abusive alcoholic who lived in Cocoa Beach, Florida, for six years. Nichols lived with the uncle and aunt of Iran's Shah Mohammad Reza Pahlavi for three years and learned Persian.

Nichols dropped out of school at 12. He was inspired at age 15 by the poems of Walt Whitman and the works of Robert Burns. He recalled to Owen Keehnen that, as early as 1955, he was sharing Donald Webster Cory's book The Homosexual in America with his gay friends.

== Activism ==
Nichols co-founded the Mattachine Society of Washington in 1961 with Frank Kameny, and the Mattachine Society of Florida in 1965. The Mattachine Society of Washington was independent of the national Mattachine Society, which had formally disbanded a few months earlier.

Beginning in 1963, he chaired the Mattachine Society of Washington's Committee on Religious Concerns, which later developed into the Washington Area Council on Religion and the Homosexual. This organization was pioneering in forging links between the gay rights movement and the National Council of Churches.

Nichols led the first gay rights march on the White House, in April 1965, and participated in the Annual Reminder pickets at Independence Hall in Philadelphia, held each July 4 from 1965 to 1969. He and other activists successfully lobbied the American Psychiatric Association to rescind its definition of homosexuality as a form of mental illness.

In 1967, Nichols became one of the first Americans to talk openly about his homosexuality on national television when he appeared in CBS Reports: The Homosexuals, a CBS News documentary. Though he allowed himself to be interviewed on camera, Nichols used the pseudonym "Warren Adkins" in the broadcast because of his father who was an FBI agent. His father had threatened him with death if the U.S. government found out Jack was his son and he lost his coveted security clearance. The use of the name "Warren" was in deference to one of Nichols' early lovers he met when visiting his aunt and uncle in Neptune Beach, Florida, in 1961. Nichols had an early taste for simple country lovers and his lover, Warren, was from West Virginia. Eventually this passion for "hillbillies" would lead to the first great love of his life, Lige Clarke, who was from Kentucky.

Due to his appearance in the documentary, Nichols was fired from his job at the International Inn located in Washington, D.C. the day after it aired.

== Writing career ==
With his partner Lige Clarke, Nichols began writing the column "The Homosexual Citizen" for Screw magazine in 1968. "The Homosexual Citizen", which borrowed its title from the newspaper published by Mattachine D.C., was the first LGBTQ-interest column in a non-LGBTQ publication.

In 1969, after moving to New York City, Nichols and Clarke founded GAY, the first weekly newspaper for gay people in the United States distributed on newsstands. The publication continued until early 1974. From 1977 to 1978, he served as the editor of Sexology. Nichols was hired in 1981 as the news editor of the San Francisco Sentinel.

From February 1997, Nichols was Senior Editor at GayToday.com, an online newsmagazine.

In November 2010, Jack Nichols' friend, Stephanie Donald, began LGBT-Today.com, in tribute to Nichols and the gay rights movement and got most of the original staff of GayToday.com together including Frank Kameny who wrote exclusively for LGBT-Today.com until his death on October 11, 2011.

== Death ==
He died on May 2, 2005, of complications from cancer of the saliva gland. His best friend, Steve Yates, was in attendance at the time of his death. Nichols's last request was to hear his favorite song, Rosemary Clooney's "Ev'ry Time We Say Goodbye", which Yates played as Nichols slipped away.

== Works ==
- Clarke, Lige; Jack Nichols (1971). I have more fun with you than anybody. St. Martin's Press.
- Clarke, Lige; Jack Nichols (1974). Roommates Can't Always be Lovers: An Intimate Guide to Male-male Relationships. St. Martin's Press.
- Jack Nichols (1975). Men's Liberation: A New Definition of Masculinity. Penguin. ISBN 0-14-004036-6.
- Jack Nichols (1976). Welcome to Fire Island. St. Martin's Press
- Jack Nichols (1996). The Gay Agenda: Talking Back to the Fundamentalists. Prometheus. ISBN 9781573921039. "The Gay Agenda: Talking Back to the Fundamentalists."
- Jack Nichols (2004). The Tomcat Chronicles: Erotic Adventures of a Gay Liberation Pioneer. Haworth Press. ISBN 1-56023-488-1.
