= John Gerassi =

French-American author, journalist, professor, and political activist (1931–2012)

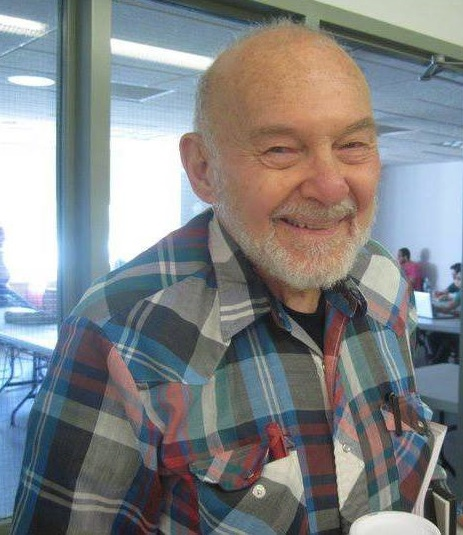
- Born: July 12, 1931; Paris, France
- Died: July 26, 2012 (aged 81); New York City, New York, U.S.
- Other name: Tito Gerassi
- Citizenship: French, Dominican, American
- Education: Columbia University (BA); London School of Economics (Doctorate)
- Occupations: Professor; journalist; author; scholar; political activist
- Children: 2
- Father: Fernando Gerassi
- Writing career
- Notable works: The Great Fear in Latin America; The Boys of Boise; The Premature Antifascists; Hated Conscience of His Century
- Military career
- Allegiance: United States
- Conflicts: Korean War

John Gerassi (July 12, 1931 – July 26, 2012), also known as Tito Gerassi or mononymously Tito, was a French-American professor, journalist, author, scholar, political activist, and revolutionary. Initially working as a journalist for Time magazine and later a foreign correspondent for The New York Times, he grew close to Che Guevara and Fidel Castro during the Cuban Revolution and analyzed the American policy against Latin America in his 1965 book The Great Fear in Latin America. In 1966, Tito would investigate the Boise homosexuality scandal in The Boys of Boise, exposing the persecution of homosexuals in the city that was carried out under the guise of a moral panic. Tito also used his close ties to figures to construct biographies, creating the only authorized biography of Sartre, Hated Conscience of His Century in 1989.

Tito also spent his life as an educator, teaching at institutions including San Francisco State University, The University of Paris (XII, Vincennes), the JFK Institute of the Free University of Berlin, UC Irvine, and Bard College. At the time of his death, he was the senior professor of Political Science at Queens College, City University of New York, where he had been teaching since 1978.

== Biography ==
=== Early life and background ===
John Gerassi was born in Paris on July 12, 1931, at the Clinique Tarnier to father Fernando Gerassi (d. 1974), a Turkish-born artist of Sephardic Jewish heritage, and Ukrainian-born mother Stépha Gerassi (née Stephania Awdykowicz; d. 1989), a writer and feminist and daughter of Klymentyna Avdykovych, a famous Lviv candy factory owner. Moving between Barcelona and the Montparnasse artistic hub in Paris, Tito's parents belonged to a cosmopolitan circle of artists and intellectuals who congregated in cafes to argue art and politics, and counted Jean-Paul Sartre and Simone de Beauvoir as close friends. At his birth, Fernando was socializing with Andre Breton, Marc Chagall, Alberto Giacometti, Simone de Beauvoir, and Joan Miro. Fernando was eventually coaxed into drinking until he passed out; Jean-Paul Sartre, the couple's best friend who recently arrived from his professorship at Le Havre, was the only sober member of the group and came in time to check on Stépha, who named the newborn Jean-Paul in his honor. When Fernando came to lucidity, he protested against the middle name, so Jean-Paul became Jean, John or Juan in Spanish, which was shortened to Juanito and then to the nickname Tito. Sartre became Tito's godfather, or "non-god father" because of his atheism.

When the Spanish Civil War broke out in Spain in 1936, at the agitation of André Malraux Fernando Gerassi joined the Loyalist forces under the International Brigade, and after distinguishing himself, was assigned by Colonel Georgy Zhukov under the Czech General Lukacz. After Lukacz's death, Fernando was promoted to a general. Fernando later served later as the inspiration for the figure of Gomez, the artist and revolutionary in Sartre's trilogy "The Roads to Freedom".

The situation for the Loyalists became untenable, but Fernando continued fighting until the fall of Barcelona. Fernando later became wary of the Molotov–Ribbentrop Pact and of the prospect of a new war, and went to Paris to insist on the establishment of Spanish Republican refugee divisions to fight the Germans. Rebuffed by the French government, when World War II became a reality, Fernando was assigned as a colonel to defend the Franco-German frontlines in the Vosges. Returning to Paris with his battalion, Fernando used his friendship with Dominican diplomat Porfirio Rubirosa to secure passports and visas for his friends and 8,000 Spanish refugees. After assuming the role of diplomats on behalf of the Dominican Republic after the flight of Rubirosa and his embassy, the family fled first to Lisbon, and after an assassination attempt from Franco's agents, finally arriving in New York City on September 3, 1941, as political refugees disguised as Dominican diplomats.

As the family were technically diplomats, Fernando was pressed into service for the Office of Strategic Services (OSS), serving in Latin America and later Spain and North Africa, earning a medal and commendation from William J. Donovan for his efforts in assisting the North African campaign. After Fernando left the OSS, the Gerassi family was harassed by the office's successor, the Central Intelligence Agency (CIA), who questioned the family in disguise as immigration agents into the presidency of Lyndon B. Johnson until Abe Fortas petitioned the government on the family's behalf and attorney general Bobby Kennedy apologized to the family and made them citizens.

After the family's emigration, Tito was raised in New York City and attended Columbia University. Tito was drafted to fight in the Korean War, and lost his best friend during the conflict, which, in addition to the conduct of American forces there, only fomented his radicalism. He spent a decade in journalism, worked as an editor for Time and, later, Newsweek before serving as a foreign correspondent for The New York Times. He left journalism at one point to pursue a career in academia and earned his doctorate at the London School of Economics.

=== Activism ===
As a New York Times correspondent he became a supporter of the Cuban revolution and a friend of Che Guevara. As a professor of political science at San Francisco State in 1968, he participated in (and was arrested during) the student strikes, which were led by the Black Student Union. Initiated in response to suspension of a radical Black Panther graduate student instructor, these strikes escalated into violent protests resulting in police confrontations and occupation and a complete four month long shut down of the university. During that period, Tito was also a co-founder and contributor to Ramparts magazine.

=== Later life ===
With Tito's termination from San Francisco State, he was blacklisted from other college teaching positions in the U.S. He subsequently moved to Paris in the early 70s, where he had an established a relationship with Jean-Paul Sartre and began conducting a series of interviews with Sartre. His intention was to help the world better understand Sartre's contribution to cultural and political thought beyond the realm of elite intellectuals and academics. He continued to teach American Foreign Policy at the University of Vincennes, where following the 1968 political uprising in Paris, its campus had been abandoned to various left wing factions debating the failure of the '68 revolution and American expatriates hoping to better understand U.S. imperialism and ways to oppose it.

The early 1970s were also significant for Tito's continued developing relationship with black nationalist leadership in the U.S. During this period, he maintained a dialogue with the various competing ideological factions that had developed within the Black Panther Party leadership. A portion of his extensive written correspondence and letters with George Jackson were published posthumously in "Blood in My Eye", four months after George Jackson was murdered during an alleged attempted escape from San Quentin prison.

John "Tito" Gerassi was admitted into hospice care in June 2012. He died at the age of 81 from cancer in the hospice care unit at the Mount Sinai Beth Israel hospital in New York City at 11:30 pm on July 26, 2012, watched over by two of his students. He died half an hour after the anniversary of the attack on the Moncada Barracks, led by Gerassi's acquaintance Fidel Castro, an event which signaled the start of the Cuban Revolution. Gerassi was survived by two daughters. At the time of his death, he was the senior professor of Political Science at Queens College, City University of New York, where he had been teaching since 1978.

== Bibliography ==
- John Gerassi. The Great Fear: The Reconquest of Latin America by Latin Americans. New York: Macmillan, 1963. According to WorldCat, the book is in 883 libraries
- John Gerassi. The Boys of Boise; Furor, Vice, and Folly in an American City. New York: Macmillan, 1966.
- John Gerassi. North Vietnam: a Documentary. Indianapolis: Bobbs-Merrill, 1968.
- John Gerassi, Venceremos! The Speeches and Writings of Ernesto Che Guevara, New York: The Macmillan Company, 1968.
- John Gerassi. The Coming of the New International: A Revolutionary Anthology. New York: The World Publishing Company, 1971{8)
- John Gerassi. Towards Revolution. London: Weidenfeld and Nicolson, 1971
- John Gerassi. The Premature Antifascists: North American Volunteers in the Spanish Civil War, 1936-39 : an Oral History. New York: Praeger, 1986.
- John Gerassi, Jean-Paul Sartre: Hated Conscience of His Century, Chicago: The University of Chicago Press, 1989. According to WorldCat, the book is in 807 libraries
- John Gerassi. The Anachronists. Cambridge: Black Apollo Press, 2006.
- John Gerassi. Talking with Sartre: Conversations and Debates. New Haven, CT: Yale University Press, 2009
- John Gerassi and Tony Monchinski, Unrepentant Radical Educator: The Writings of John Gerassi, Rotterdam: Sense Publishers, 2009.

TBC: List of Collections: audio recordings, letters and correspondence, news reportage and documentary footage - video/film/photography
