= Karl Bowman =

American psychiatrist (1888–1973)

Karl M. Bowman
- Born: November 4, 1888; Topeka, Kansas, United States
- Died: March 2, 1973 (aged 84); San Francisco, California, United States
- Education: Washburn University: University of California, Berkeley
- Known for: research into alcohol, drugs and sexuality, schizophrenia, insulin shock therapy
- Scientific career
- Fields: Psychiatry

Karl Murdock Bowman (November 4, 1888 – March 2, 1973) was a pioneer in the study of psychiatry. From 1944 to 1946 he was the president of the American Psychiatric Association. His work in alcoholism, schizophrenia, and homosexuality is particularly often cited.

== Family and education ==
Bowman was born in Topeka, Kansas, and graduated from Washburn University. His nickname in college was "Tommy," according to the school's 1910 yearbook. While at Washburn, he was a member and president of the Delta Phi Fraternity, forerunner of the Kansas Beta chapter of Phi Delta Theta fraternity. Bowman was initiated into Phi Delta Theta with the chapter's founding fathers on October 1, 1910. In 1913, he graduated from medical school at the University of California, Berkeley with his M.D.

Bowman was married to the former Eliza Abbot Stearns. Together they had four sons and 13 grandchildren.

During World War I, Bowman was a captain in the Army Medical Corps from 1917 to 1919.

== Psychiatric work ==
In the course of his career, Bowman conducted pioneering work on the psychiatric effects of alcohol, drugs, and sexuality. He also conducted research on schizophrenia and the use of insulin shock therapy. He testified at the trials of Nathan F. Leopold and Richard Loeb for the murder of Robert Franks in 1924 as well as in many other celebrated cases.

During his career, Bowman was the chief medical officer at the Boston Psychopathic Hospital; an assistant professor of psychiatry at Harvard Medical School (1921–1936); the chief of psychiatry at Bellevue Hospital (1936–1941); a professor of psychiatry at New York University Medical College (1936–1941); the first chairman and director of the Langley Porter Psychiatric Institute (1941–1956); and a professor at the University of California, Berkeley. He was also the head of the Laguna Honda Psychiatric Hospital in San Francisco (1941–1967)

As the retiring president of the American Psychiatric Association in 1946, he made headlines when he predicted that 10 million people in the United States would at some time in their lives require hospitalization for mental disorders. Bowman was also a board member of the American Board of Psychiatry and Neurology.

=== Alcoholism ===
Bowman was Head of the Department of Psychiatry at Bellevue Hospital in New York City when Dr. Allen Gregg (Director of the Rockefeller Foundation) asked him to participate in an alcoholism study he had been preparing. Bowman was interested in this project but wished to have a part in leading the study. In 1938, Bowman joined the Moore Group. This group founded the "Research Council on Problems of Alcohol" or the RCPA, which was an organization similar to Alcoholics Anonymous. Soon after it was created, Bowman became a leader of this organization. With E. Morton Jellinek, he co-wrote an influential 1941 article, "Alcohol Addiction and Its Treatment," synthesizing prior typologies of alcoholism and classifying alcoholics into four types, which was the basis of Jellinek's later five-stage typology. He also researched and wrote on marijuana.

=== Schizophrenia ===
Karl Bowman read his article "The Modern Treatment of Schizophrenia" at the New York Academy of Medicine in New York on February 17, 1939. During his reading, Bowman stated, "over one half of the population of State Hospitals" consisted of patients diagnosed with schizophrenia. He claimed that this psychological disorder did not shorten the lifespan of the patient, but resulted in the deterioration of the patient's brain. In his article, Bowman addresses many different methods that were used throughout history to help treat schizophrenia. For example, fever therapy consisted of inducing a fever in the patient using various methods, such as the malaria virus, but did not produce effective results in the treatment of schizophrenia. Sleep therapy was carried out using sleep-inducing substances such as marijuana, opium, and somnifen. Bowman also addresses stimulus therapy; this method had only temporary effects. Bowman recommended the insulin method as effective, with longer-lasting effects and more indications of long-term improvement. Bowman was optimistic about schizophrenia patients whose conditions had improved or had been cured and also about future treatment methods for schizophrenia patients.

=== Homosexuality ===
During the 1950s and 1960s, Bowman collaborated in a number of studies on homosexuality and wrote a report on it for the State of California. In 1953, in "The Problem of Homosexuality," co-authored with Bernice Engle, he argued for multiple causes, including genetics, but proposed that castration be studied as a cure. However, in 1961 he appeared in the television documentary The Rejected presenting the viewpoint that homosexuality is not a mental illness and should be legalized.

=== Legacy in the Philippines ===
In the 1920's, Bowman supervised Dr. Jose Fernandez, a Filipino physician and future clinical director of the National Psychopathic Hospital, in the Philippines. After the war, Dr. Bowman responded to appeals from his former trainee and sent "a small check and some books" while at the same time encouraging his colleagues to do the same.

== Selected works ==
=== Books ===
- Personal Problems for Men and Women. New York: Greenberg. 1931. OCLC 1114346.
  - Towards Peace of Mind: Everyday Problems of Mental Health. London: Unwin. 1936. OCLC 2475650. – reprint
- Final report on California sexual deviation research: March, 1954 (Report). Sacramento: State of California. 1954. OCLC 22124723.
- My years in psychiatry, 1915-1968: an interview with Karl M. Bowman, M.D., San Francisco, February 27 and 28, 1968. Sacramento: California State Department of Mental Hygiene. 1969. OCLC 58860757.

=== Articles ===
- Bowman, Karl (January 1928). "Factors Determining the Development of Natural and Unnatural Habit Movements". Dental Cosmos. 70 (1): 35–44.
- Bowman, Karl (September 1931). "Practical Clinical Psychiatry for Students and Practitioners". American Journal of Public Health. 21 (9): 1074–1075. doi:10.2105/AJPH.21.9.1074-b.
- Bowman, Karl (April 1933). "The Sciences of Man in the Making: An Orientation Book". American Journal of Public Health. 23 (4): 391. doi:10.2105/AJPH.23.4.391-a.
- Bowman, Karl (May 1939). "Modern Treatment of Schizophrenia". Bulletin of the New York Academy of Medicine. 15 (5): 338–353. PMC 1911385. PMID 19312108.
- Goldfarb, Walter; Bowman, Karl; Parker, Sam; Krautman, B. (September 1939). "The Treatment of Acute Alcoholism with Glucose and Insulin". Journal of Clinical Investigation. 18 (5): 581–584. doi:10.1172/JCI101070. PMC 434902. PMID 16694688.
- Bowman, Karl (1940). "Liquor, Servant of Man". American Journal of Public Health. 30 (3): 296. doi:10.2105/AJPH.30.3.296-a.
- Allentuck, Samuel; Bowman, Karl (1942). "The Psychiatric Aspects of Marihuana Intoxication". American Journal of Psychiatry. 99 (2): 248–251. doi:10.1176/ajp.99.2.248.
- Bowman, Karl; Jellinek, E. Morton (1941). "Alcohol Addiction and Its Treatment". Quarterly Journal of Studies on Alcohol. 2: 98–176. doi:10.15288/QJSA.1941.2.98.
  - Reprinted in Jellinek, E. Morton, ed. (1942). Alcohol Addiction and Chronic Alcoholism. Vol. 1: Effects of Alcohol on the Individual: A Critical Exposition of Present Knowledge. New Haven, CT: Yale University Press. OCLC 63622529.
- Bowman, Karl (1944). "Psychiatric Aspects of Marihuana Intoxication". Journal of the American Medical Association. 125 (5): 376. doi:10.1001/jama.1944.02850230056022.
- Ruesch, Jurgen; Bowman, Karl (September 1945). "Prolonged Post-Traumatic Syndromes Following Head Injury". American Journal of Psychiatry. 102 (2): 145–163. doi:10.1176/ajp.102.2.145.
- Bowman, Karl; Engle, Bernice (January 1953). "The Problem of Homosexuality" (PDF). Journal of Social Hygiene. 39 (1): 2–16.
- Gordon, Gene; Bowman, Karl (April 1953). "The Auxiliary Treatment of Psychotic Women—Group Therapy for Their Husbands". California Medicine. 78 (4): 303–308. PMC 1521800. PMID 13042665.
- Bowman, Karl; Engle, Bernice (Spring 1956). "A Psychiatric Evaluation of Laws of Homosexuality". Temple Law Quarterly. 29 (3): 273–326.
- Christman, Henry M., ed. (1970). A View of the Nation: An Anthology, 1955-1959. Books for Libraries Press. p. 146. ISBN 978-0-8369-1620-1.
