= Is Homosexuality a Menace? =

1957 book by Arthur Guy Mathews

Is Homosexuality a Menace? A Revealing Examination of Sex Deviation by a Physician and Criminologist
- Cover
- Author: Arthur Guy Mathews
- Language: English
- Subject: Homosexuality
- Publisher: Robert M. McBride Company
- Publication date: 1957
- Publication place: United States
- Media type: Print (hardcover)
- Pages: 302

Is Homosexuality a Menace? A Revealing Examination of Sex Deviation by a Physician and Criminologist is a book by Arthur Guy Mathews published in 1957. The book claimed that there were 7,000 homosexuals on the government payroll in each of Washington, D.C., and New York City, with many of those in New York having come from Washington to work at the United Nations headquarters.
