= Other Voices (Canadian TV program) =

- Genre: Current affairs
- Presented by: Don Francks
- Country of origin: Canada
- Original language: English
- No. of seasons: 1

Production
- Executive producer: Jim Guthro
- Producer: Richard Nielsen
- Running time: 30 minutes

Original release
- Network: CBC Television
- Release: 6 October 1964 – 29 June 1965

Other Voices is a Canadian current affairs television program that aired on CBC Television from 1964 to 1965.

== Premise ==
Don Francks hosted this program which sought to feature groups who did not usually receive significant television coverage such as First Nations people living on reserve, youth in the British Mods and Rockers subcultures, and homosexuals ("Every Tenth Man"). It also contained dramatic, musical or satirical sketches. The program also featured people such as author Wyndham Lewis, composer Charles Mingus, academic Marshall McLuhan, filmmaker Leni Riefenstahl, painter Frederick Varley and musician Joe Hill. Other Voices filled the current affairs void left by the cancellation of the previous season's Horizon.

== Scheduling ==
This half-hour program was broadcast on Tuesdays at 10:30 p.m. (Eastern) in two runs, from 6 October to 29 December 1964, then 6 April to 29 June 1965.

== Reception ==
The program attempted controversy, but an episode on cultural mediocrity drew criticism from one of its interview subjects, Gladys Taylor, who assumed the discussion was about the arts. Instead, when the programme aired, she unexpectedly found herself ridiculed as a "mediocrat".
