= The Homosexuals (CBS Reports) =

- CBS Reports episode
- Mike Wallace interviews a homosexual whose identity is concealed in shadow.
- Written by: Mike Wallace; William Peters; Harry Morgan
- Original air date: March 7, 1967
- Running time: 43 minutes

"The Homosexuals" is a 1967 episode of the documentary television series CBS Reports. The hour-long broadcast featured a discussion of a number of topics related to homosexuality and homosexuals. Mike Wallace anchored the episode, which aired on March 7, 1967. Although this was the first network documentary dealing with the topic of homosexuality, it was not the first televised in the United States. That was The Rejected, produced and aired in 1961 on KQED, a public television station in San Francisco.

Three years in the making, "The Homosexuals" went through two producers and multiple revisions. The episode included interviews with several gay men, psychiatrists, legal experts and cultural critics, interspersed with footage of a gay bar and a police sex sting. "The Homosexuals" garnered mixed critical response. The network received praise from some quarters and criticism from others for even airing the program.

== Production ==
The program was initially proposed in 1964. The first version was produced by William Peters, with production supervised by executive producer Fred W. Friendly. Upon accepting the assignment, Peters began his research by reading books and consulting with experts in the field. Peters suggested that the program focus exclusively on gay men and that he cover lesbians in a second program, and Friendly agreed. Principal filming took place starting in the fall of 1964 and continued through early 1965. Peters interviewed men in San Francisco, Philadelphia, Charlotte and New York City, accumulating 30 hours of footage. The identities of several of the men were obscured in some fashion, either in shadow or, in one instance, behind a large potted palm tree. Also interviewed were psychiatrist Charles Socarides, who strongly advocated the position that homosexuality is a mental disorder, and fellow psychiatrist Irving Bieber, who shared Socarides' opinion of homosexuality as pathology. Interspersed with these interview segments was footage, described as being in the cinéma vérité style, of the inside of a gay bar along with shots of hustlers working a street corner and a teenager being arrested in a public sex sting.

After assembling a rough cut, Peters approached Mike Wallace to anchor the hour. Wallace was initially reluctant but after viewing the program enthusiastically agreed. Despite his enthusiasm, Wallace's commentary disparaged homosexuals.

The average homosexual, if there be such, is promiscuous. He is not interested or capable of a lasting relationship like that of a heterosexual marriage. His sex life, his love life, consists of a series of one–chance encounters at the clubs and bars he inhabits. And even on the streets of the city — the pick-up, the one night stand, these are characteristics of the homosexual relationship.

Friendly generally approved of the first version but believed that it was necessary to include information on same-sex sexual practices. When those practices were explained to him, however, he changed his mind. While the documentary was still in production, Friendly was promoted to the presidency of CBS News but left soon after over a disagreement over the network's coverage of the Vietnam War. He was replaced by Richard S. Salant, who was known for his cost-consciousness, which put the future of the documentary and the CBS Reports series in question.

Salant did try to kill the documentary, but stories about it began appearing in the trade press, putting CBS into a potentially embarrassing situation were it not to air. In mid-1965, Salant gave Peters the go-ahead to complete the episode. Peters worked with the New York chapter of the Mattachine Society to secure interviews with two additional gay subjects, Lars Larson and Jack Nichols, both of whom were fully accepting of their sexuality. Nichols later recalled his encounter with Wallace:

[A]fter we finished and the camera was turned off, Mike Wallace sat down with me and talked for about half an hour. He said, "You know, you answered all of my questions capably, but I have a feeling that you don't really believe that homosexuality is as acceptable as you make it sound." I asked him why he would say that. "Because," he said, "in your heart I think you know it's wrong." It was infuriating. I told him I thought being gay was just fine, but that in his heart he thought it was wrong.

Peters added more footage of psychiatrists espousing that model along with scenes from the 1965 convention of the East Coast Homophile Organizations. CBS gave final approval to "The Homosexuals" and scheduled it to air in the spring of 1966.

Salant later pulled the episode from the schedule and assigned producer Harry Morgan to re-edit it. According to Wallace, Salant found the piece sensationalistic; however, C. A. Tripp, a psychologist who had put CBS in touch with his patient Larson, claimed that Salant felt the piece was pro-homosexuality. Morgan scrapped all but about 10 minutes of Peters' final cut. CBS felt that the self-accepting gay men made too favorable of an impression, so Morgan edited two of the interviews to make the men seem unhappier. According to Wallace, no sponsor would buy time during the episode because of the taboo nature of the subject matter. Commercial spots were filled by public service announcements for the Peace Corps and the Internal Revenue Service.

== Overview ==
The first interview subject was a gay man, Lars Larson, who appeared undisguised and who spoke positively about his sexuality. Following his interview, Wallace gave the results of a CBS News poll that found that Americans considered homosexuality more harmful to the United States than adultery, abortion or prostitution, that two-thirds of Americans described their reaction to homosexuality as "disgust, discomfort or fear" and that one in ten described their reaction as "hatred". Just ten percent believed homosexuality was a crime but the majority still believed it should be criminally sanctioned.

A gay man with his face hidden behind a potted plant

Following the poll, another gay man was interviewed from his psychiatrist's couch with his face obscured by shadow. He described coming out to his family, saying they treated him "like some wounded animal they were going to send to the vet." Following this man was another unobscured subject Jack Nichols (who had taken on the pseudonym "Warren Adkins" for the program), co-founder of the Washington, D.C. branch of the Mattachine Society. He contrasted the comments of the previous subject, saying that he had come out to his family at age 14 and, far from being treated like a sick animal, they treated him with warmth and understanding.

After remarks from Socarides advocating the disease model of homosexuality, Wallace discussed the legal aspects of homosexuality, noting that England was preparing to de-criminalize homosexual acts. Federal judge James Braxton Craven, Jr. from North Carolina advocated a re-evaluation of United States law, commenting, "Is it not time to redraft a criminal statute first enacted in 1533?" Following footage of Nichols and Mattachine D.C. co-founder Frank Kameny picketing Independence Hall and the State Department, Kameny, under his real name, advocated a re-examination of federal law that placed a blanket ban on known homosexuals receiving security clearances.

Next, Albert Goldman (then an English professor at Columbia University) and author and playwright Gore Vidal debated homosexuality, with an emphasis on the presence of homosexuals in the creative arts. Goldman asserted that homosexuality "is just one of a number of...things all tending toward the subversion, toward the final erosion, of our cultural values." Vidal, asserting that homosexuality is as natural as heterosexuality, countered by saying "The United States is living out some mad Protestant nineteenth-century dream of human behavior....I think the so-called breaking of the moral fiber of this country is one of the healthiest things that's begun to happen."

Wallace closed with an interview with a gay man, with a wife and two children, who claimed that the narcissism of gay men made it impossible for two men to form a long-term loving relationship. Wrapping up the hour, Wallace concluded:

The dilemma of the homosexual: told by the medical profession he is sick; by the law that he's a criminal; shunned by employers; rejected by heterosexual society. Incapable of a fulfilling relationship with a woman, or for that matter with a man. At the center of his life he remains anonymous. A displaced person. An outsider.

Also discussed were religious attitudes toward homosexuality and the Boise homosexuality scandal, a sweeping investigation of a supposed "homosexual underground" in Boise, Idaho, in 1955.

== Critical reaction ==
Critical response of the time to the program was mixed. The New York Times, The Washington Star, and the Chicago Daily News praised CBS for addressing the subject. George Gent of the Times, however, commented on the anti-gay bias of the show, noting that it would "have been better to give the minority viewpoint that homosexuals are just as normal as anyone else a chance to speak for itself." The Chicago Tribune titled its review "TV No Spot to Unload Garbage" and attacked CBS for presenting such material to young and impressionable viewers.

More recent critical attention to "The Homosexuals" has also been mixed, trending to the negative. In one corner, anchor Mike Wallace is praised for debunking negative stereotypes about gay men. In the other, Wallace's commentary is condemned as "a string of gross generalizations and negative stereotypes [that] sounds as if it was scripted by Rev. Jerry Falwell." In noting that approximately 20% of television viewers in the United States saw the program, LGBT activist Wayne Besen labels the broadcast "the single most destructive hour of antigay propaganda in our nation's history." He says that the episode "not only had a devastating effect on public opinion but also was a nuclear bomb dropped on the psyches of gay and lesbian Americans, who, prior to this show, had never been represented as a group on national television."

== Participants' response and personal consequences ==
Lars Larson, the first interview subject, was infuriated after seeing the finished program. He had been led to believe that the episode would present a far more positive picture of American gay life. Larson, whose interview had been altered to make him seem less happy, filed a formal fraud complaint and withdrew his release. "They had some rather nasty, angry anti-gay people on there who were treated as professionals," he said. "I had no problem with Harry Morgan or Mike Wallace because they were thorough. But obviously others in the decision-making process were truly upset with homosexuality. They saw it as a threat to the human race and were out to kill as best they could." Jack Nichols was fired from his job as a hotel sales manager the day after the program aired.

For his part, anchor Mike Wallace came to regret his participation in the episode. "I should have known better," he said in 1992. Speaking in 1996, Wallace stated, "That is — God help us — what our understanding was of the homosexual lifestyle a mere twenty-five years ago because nobody was out of the closet and because that's what we heard from doctors — that's what Socarides told us, it was a matter of shame." However, Wallace was at the time of broadcast close friends with noted designer James Amster (creator of the landmark Amster Yard courtyard in New York City) and Amster's male long-term companion, men whom Wallace later described as "a wonderful old married couple" and "[b]oth people that [he] admired". Despite this personal knowledge, Wallace relied on the American Psychiatric Association's categorization of homosexuality as a mental illness rather than his own experience in creating the episode. As recently as 1995, Wallace told an interviewer that he believed homosexuals could change their orientation if they really wanted to.
