= Furnald Hall =

Coordinates: 40°48′27″N 73°57′50″W

- Interactive map of the Furnald Hall area

General information
- Location: 2940 Broadway, New York City, New York
- Named for: Royal Blacker Furnald
- Opened: 1913
- Owner: Columbia University

Technical details
- Floor count: 10

Design and construction
- Architect: McKim, Mead & White

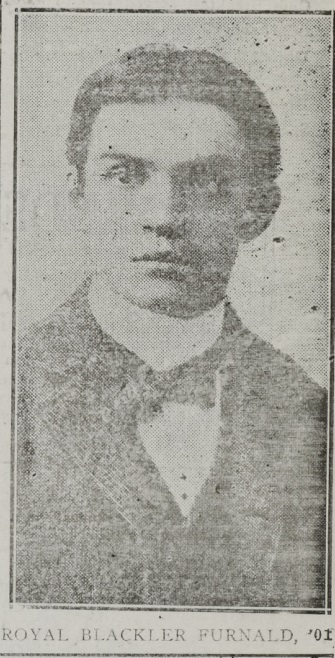
Royal Blacker Furnald, Columbia College, Class of 1901 for whom the building is named.

Furnald Hall is a dormitory located on Columbia University's Morningside Heights campus and currently houses first-year students from Columbia College as well as the Fu Foundation School of Engineering and Applied Science. It is dedicated in memory of Royal Blacker Furnald, of the Columbia College Class of 1901.

== History ==
In 1907, New York real estate developer Francis Furnald (1847–1907) left funds in his will to erect a residence hall at Columbia University in memory of his son, Royal Blacker Furnald (1880–1899) who would have graduated with the class of 1901. However, the money was meant to be transferred to the university only after the death of Furnald's wife, Sarah E. Furnald (d. 1920). To build the dormitory, Columbia offered Mrs. Furnald annual payments for life equivalent to the annual interest on the investment if she would advance the funds, totaling $300,000, to the university. Mrs. Furnald accepted the offer and the building was constructed in 1912–13, designed by McKim, Mead & White.

In 1924, Furnald Hall was the site of a cross-burning incident by men wearing Ku Klux Klan robes, targeting a black Columbia law student, Frederick W. Wells, who recently moved into a room in the building. While the cross was burning on the lawns outside the building, white students ran through the corridors, hurling derogatory and threatening remarks at Wells. In the following days, Wells also received death threats from the KKK. The incident received widespread national media attention from The New York Times to the Los Angeles Times, but according to Columbia researchers, was "effectively nonexistent" in the university's institutional records. In 2022, the university administration erected a marker on the building as part of a campus-wide effort to acknowledge the school's legacy of slavery and racism and commemorate the struggles of its African American students.

During World War II, the building was used as a dorm for naval reserve officers in the United States Naval Reserve Midshipmen's School.

In the 1968 Columbia University protests, the building witnessed violent clashes between police and students protestors and policy brutality against student bystanders.

In 1971, gay students at Columbia, led by Morty Manford, later head of the Gay Activists Alliance and son of PFLAG founder Jeanne Manford, took over an unused space in the dormitory basement and eventually obtained permission from school officials to use the space as a gay lounge, which has been operational until recently as the Stephen Donaldson Lounge.

The basement of Furnald Hall was also the site of a nonprofit grocery store from 1976 to 1989, founded by students from Columbia and Barnard in response to rising food prices on campus. In its final year of operation, on December 20, 1988, Columbia security guard Garry Germain was shot and killed while patrolling the area between the Furnald Grocery and what is now Pulitzer Hall. The grocery store was closed temporarily until March 1989 in the aftermath of the murder, and closed permanently in December 1989. As of 2023, the murder of Germain remains unsolved.

== Notable residents ==
- Federico García Lorca - Spanish poet, lived in room 617
- Herman Wouk - American writer, lived on the top floor of the dormitory
- Armen Donelian - jazz musician
- Brad Gooch - writer
- Andrei Markovits - professor of political science at University of Michigan
- Eric Garcetti - former Mayor of Los Angeles, United States Ambassador to India
- John Kennedy Toole - novelist
- Hu Shih - Chinese philosopher, former president of Peking University and Chinese ambassador to the United States
- Robert Lax - American poet
- Talât Sait Halman - Turkish writer, historian, Turkey's first Minister of Culture
- Leslie Frost Ballantine - author of children's books and daughter of Robert Frost
- Evan S. Connell - American writer
- Karl Katz - Israeli art historian, curator, director of the Israel Museum

== In popular culture ==
Furnald Hall was prominently featured in Herman Wouk's novel The Caine Mutiny, since the building serves as the residence of the protagonist, Willis Seward "Willie" Keith, who was attending naval midshipman's school at Columbia.
