= Marty Robinson (gay activist) =

American gay activist (1942–1992)

- Born: Martin Robinson; November 25, 1942; Brooklyn, N.Y.
- Died: March 19, 1992 (aged 49); Brooklyn, N.Y.
- Education: New York University
- Occupation: Gay Activist
- Organization(s): Gay Activists Alliance, Gay Liberation Front

Martin "Marty" Robinson (November 25, 1942 – March 19, 1992) was an American gay activist, "known for his provocative protests."

== Activism ==
On June 28, 1969, Robinson was a participant in the Stonewall Riot, which focused his activism on gay rights. Activist Mark Segal recounts that Robinson and Martha Shelley stood and made speeches from the front door of the Stonewall on June 29, 1969, the second night of the riot. Segal says, they "made the point clear that we were oppressed. We needed to do something. And that meant fight back."

Robinson was a member of the Mattachine Action Committee and co-founded the Gay Liberation Front, where he wrote for their newsletter Come Out!, and co-founded the Gay Activists Alliance (GAA) later that year. He was also a founding member of ACT UP, the National Gay Task Force, and GLAAD. Robinson was one of the "initial fundamental players in T&D", the Treatment and Data group in ACT UP. T&D focussed on getting existing experimental drugs released quickly, letting people with AIDS know where these trials were and how to get into them, and insist that new drugs be developed.

Robinson is credited with developing political "zaps" while at Gay Activists Alliance and was known as "Mr. Zaps". Zaps were chaotic and theatrical interventions intended to attract the attention of the press. GAA's first zaps were aimed at New York's then-mayor, John Lindsay. The group relentlessly interrupted Lindsay's speeches at the Metropolitan Opera and during live TV interviews. Eventually, Lindsay met with the GAA and he announced his support for a bill that prohibited discrimination against LGBTQ people in New York in 1971. "The fact that Lindsay responded to pressure tactics from gays is exciting and frightening. It signals the political potential of our movement. Gays are now wielding political power and eventually they will wield much more power. And that's scary — to be a part of big-time power politics," Robinson said.

On June 24, 1970, with his partner Tom Doerr and three others, he was arrested at a GAA sit-in at the Republican State Committee; they became known as the Rockefeller Five. In November 1970, Robinson appeared with Arthur Evans and Dick Leitsch (President of the Mattachine Society New York) on The Dick Cavett Show to explain the goals of the Gay Liberation Font. They made the group among the first openly gay activists to be prominently featured on a national TV program.

In 1986 he left GLAAD and founded the Lavender Hill Mob because he felt existing pressure groups were not sufficiently radical to effect policy change required by the AIDS crisis.

== Personal ==
Robinson had been a hippie and had dropped out of Brooklyn College where he was majoring in biology. He worked as a union carpenter, specializing in residential remodeling.

Robinson died of AIDS in March 1992. An archive of his papers is held by the New York City LGBT Center. He was Jewish.
