= Inner Circle (parody group) =

American parody group

The Inner Circle is an American musical parody group made up of seasoned reporters, bloggers, web journalists, and television and radio personalities from the New York City metro area.

It hosts an annual fund-raising gala event in the spring, all of whose proceeds go to journalism and educational non-profits, as well as other charities. Each year's show has a different theme. The gala features a two-act performance by the group, which lampoons local, state, and national politics and cultural issues. That performance is then followed by a "rebuttal" performance by the mayor of New York City. There is a strict "No Professional Talent" rule for Inner Circle group members. That rule does not apply to the mayor's rebuttal, which often features nationally known professional entertainers.

== History ==
The Inner Circle was established in 1922 by New York City newspaper reporters covering City Hall. The organization is a successor to Amen Corner and the Association of City Hall Reporters, two groups of reporters who would parody local politicians at what were called "stunt dinners". The Inner Circle sought to expand the reach of the group by satirizing national politicians as well.

=== Women in the Inner Circle ===
Prior to 1973, women were not permitted to join the Inner Circle or take part in the show, and female guests were relegated to the balcony. Dorothy Schiff, owner and publisher of the New York Post, refused to attend in protest, and Mayor Lindsay's wife Mary would flick peanuts from her balcony table at the men seated below.

In 1972, the Inner Circle held a meeting to discuss whether or not they should permit women to join. George Douris, of the Long Island Press, and Mickey Carroll argued in favor of admitting women. Two Daily News newsmen, Eddie O'Neill and Owen Fitzgerald, argued against. The meeting concluded with a decision that a vote would be conducted by mail. The mailed-in vote was 69-to-15 in favor of the motion, and it was decided that the four new members for the 1973 show would be women. The first women to be admitted to the Inner Circle were Edith Evans Asbury of The New York Times, Marcia Chambers of the Associated Press, Jean Crafton of the Daily News, and Maureen O'Neill of Newsday. The show began with the following announcement: "... the Inner Circle, 50 years old and they've just learned about girls". This was followed by the first four female members singing the Maurice Chevalier song, "Thank Heaven for Little Girls".

=== The 1972 debacle ===
On April 15, 1972, the Gay Activists Alliance (GAA) used the annual show to hand out leaflets to raise awareness about gay rights issues. The leaflets accused the news media and New York City government of discriminating against gay people. The GAA expected the Inner Circle audience to be largely made up of journalists and members of the press. However, the journalists were backstage, preparing for the show, and the actual audience consisted mostly of politicians, judges and labor union people. Several fights broke out between people in the audience and the activists: as the judge would comment in a resulting trial, testimony varied and left the origin of the scuffle unclear. One activist, Morty Manford, was injured and taken to the hospital. Mickey Maye, the leader of the firefighter's union at the time and a former Golden Gloves boxer, was arrested and charged with harassment: he was later acquitted. Inner Circle members did not find out about this until it was written about in the news. This incident led to the founding of Parents and Friends of Lesbians and Gays by Manford's mother, Jeanne Manford.

== Structure of the show ==
The Inner Circle show is divided into two acts.

- The first act focuses on lampooning the current New York City Mayor
- The second act attacks state and national politics. During the 1990s, the Inner Circle also began to focus on celebrities

The show is followed by a rebuttal from the current mayor of New York.

== Highlights ==
- 1923: The first ever Inner Circle satirized Governor Alfred E. Smith in a musical comedy called "The Supersmith".
- 1947: Governor Thomas E. Dewey and Mayor William O'Dwyer were parodied in "The Axeman Cometh".
- 1954: Governor Dewey and Mayor Robert F. Wagner, Jr. were lampooned in "Ringmaster".
- 1960: Mayor Wagner cut his vacation in the Bahamas short so that he would be able to attend the Inner Circle show.
- 1962: President Kennedy, Governor Rockefeller and Mayor Wagner were parodied with a song called "The Unsinkable Bobby Wagner, or How to Succeed in Politics Without Really Trying".
- 1967: Mayor Lindsay appeared in a sequined tie, dancing such then-popular dance moves as The Frug and The Swim.
- 1968: Mayor Lindsay was portrayed as an airplane hijacker trying unsuccessfully to land in Cuba, but whom the Cubans would not allow to land because they "had enough of their own troubles already".
- 2000: Mayor Rudy Giuliani was dressed in drag and flirts with real estate developer, and later President, Donald Trump. The scene culminates with Trump nuzzling his face into Giuliani's fake breasts, with the mayor exclaiming "Oh, you dirty boy, you!", slapping Trump in the face, and distancing himself to add "Donald, I thought you were a gentleman!" Trump replied, "Can't say I didn't try!"
- 2008: The Inner Circle enacted a last-minute change to the show after Governor Eliot Spitzer became embroiled in a prostitution scandal. Several jokes about the scandal were incorporated into the show, including the addition of a song called "Love Client Number 9" (a spoof of "Love Potion No. 9").
- 2011: In "Meet the Focker-Uppers", the Inner Circle unknowingly predicted the Anthony Weiner sexting scandals, by superimposing Weiner's face onto a shirtless photo of Representative Chris Lee, who recently had resigned after soliciting a woman on Craigslist; Inner Circle's then-president, Mark Lieberman, joked that Weiner was "picking up where Congressman Lee left off".
- 2016: Then-Mayor of New York City Bill de Blasio explained his delay in endorsing Democratic Party nominee Hillary Clinton for president as his operating on "C.P. time." The actor Leslie Odom Jr., starring in the Broadway show Hamilton, then replied, "I don't like jokes like that, Bill," after which Clinton delivered the punch line, that CPT stood for "cautious politician time." This skit was widely criticized, with The Root calling it "cringeworthy" while the conservative outlet TownHall pointed to a double standard that, "It's only racist if Republicans do it." In response, during the 2016 White House Correspondents' Dinner later that month, President Barack Obama jokingly apologized for being late because of "running on C.P.T." adding that this stands for "jokes white people should not make".

=== Mayoral rebuttals ===
A screenshot of footage from the Mayor's Inner Circle Press Roast, depicting Rudy Giuliani, dressed in drag, flirting with Donald Trump.

For the first few decades of the Inner Circle, the incumbent New York Mayor would deliver a rebuttal to the show in the form of a humorous speech. This changed in 1966, when Mayor John Lindsay instead performed a song-and-dance routine with actress Florence Henderson, setting a precedent which continues into the present day.

- Ed Koch emerged from the mouth of a man-eating plant from the Broadway show Little Shop of Horrors. In 1984, then-Mayor Koch appeared in drag, in a gold lamé bodysuit with a mechanical pigeon on his head.
- Mayor David Dinkins put on a comedic newscast with Mary Tyler Moore and Gregory Hines.
- In 1997, Rudy Giuliani's appeared in a pink gown, blond wig, high heels and makeup, calling himself "Rudia", and proceeded to sing "Happy Birthday, Mr. President" in falsetto. Later, in 2000, he was dressed on stage in male disco garb, spoofing John Travolta in Saturday Night Fever, but also appeared as Rudia in taped video clips, in which he flirted with real-estate mogul Donald Trump, and later had an exchange with Joan Rivers about Hillary Clinton.
- Mayor Michael Bloomberg has appeared with the casts of the Broadway shows Chicago, Spamalot, Mary Poppins, and Mamma Mia!. He has also been accompanied by Caroline Kennedy and quarterback Eli Manning, and once made his exit astride a donkey which he dubbed "The Burro of Manhattan". In 2010, the Mayor, in full hippie regalia, performed in "Mair", a sendoff of Hair.
- In 2026, Mayor Zohran Mamdani performed a skit with rival mayoral candidate Curtis Sliwa, revolving around cat allergy shots that the mayor had to get prior to bringing a cat into Gracie Mansion. The skit's collaborative nature drew ire from some traditional Democrats and Republicans.
