= GLAAD =

American LGBT media monitoring group

- Founded: 1985; 41 years ago (as Gay & Lesbian Alliance Against Defamation)
- Founders: Vito Russo; Jewelle Gomez; Gregory Kolovakos; Darrell Yates Rist; Marcia Pally; Allen Barnett; Barry Adkins; Arnie Kantrowitz; Marty Robinson; Jim Owles; Bruce Michael-Gelbert; Hal Offen
- Purpose: Discrimination in media
- Locations: New York City, New York, U.S.; Los Angeles, California, U.S.
- Region served: United States
- Method: Media monitoring
- Key people: Sarah Kate Ellis (President)
- Revenue: US$25,260,000 (2023)
- Expenses: US$21,160,000 (2023)
- Employees: 74 (in the US)
- Website: www.glaad.org

GLAAD (/ɡlæd/) is an American non-governmental media monitoring organization. Originally founded as a protest against defamatory coverage of gay and lesbian demographics and their portrayals in the media and entertainment industries, it has since expanded to queer, bisexual, and transgender people.

== History ==
Formed in New York City as the Gay & Lesbian Alliance Against Defamation in 1985 to protest against what it saw as the New York Post's defamatory and sensationalized AIDS coverage, GLAAD put pressure on media organizations to end what it saw as homophobic reporting. Initial meetings were held in the homes of several New York City activists as well as after-hours at the New York State Council on the Arts.

This core founding group included film scholar Vito Russo; translator Gregory Kolovakos, then on the staff of the NYS Arts Council and who later became the organization's first executive director; Jewelle Gomez, the organization's first treasurer; writers Darrell Yates Rist, Marcia Pally and Allen Barnett; New York Native then-editor Barry Adkins; Russo's fellow Gay Activists Alliance veterans Arnie Kantrowitz, Marty Robinson, Jim Owles and Hal Offen; and music critic Bruce Michael-Gelbert.

In 1987, after a meeting with GLAAD, The New York Times changed its editorial policy to use the word "gay" instead of harsher terms referring to homosexuality. GLAAD advocated that the Associated Press and other television and print news sources follow. GLAAD's influence soon spread to Los Angeles, where organizers began working with the entertainment industry to change the way the gay and lesbian community was portrayed on screen.

Entertainment Weekly has named GLAAD as one of Hollywood's most powerful entities, and the Los Angeles Times described GLAAD as "possibly one of the most successful organizations lobbying the media for inclusion".

Within the first five years of its founding in New York as the Gay and Lesbian Anti-Defamation League (soon after changed to "Gay & Lesbian Alliance Against Defamation" after legal pressure by the Anti-Defamation League), GLAAD chapters had been established in Los Angeles and other cities, with the LA chapter becoming particularly influential due to its proximity to the California entertainment industry. GLAAD/NY and GLAAD/LA would eventually vote to merge in 1994, with other city chapters joining soon afterward; however, the chapters continue to exist, with the ceremonies of the GLAAD Media Awards being divided each year into three ceremonies held in New York City, Los Angeles and San Francisco.

Following the 2011 resignation of Jarrett Barrios from the GLAAD presidency, Mike Thompson served as interim president until the announcement of Herndon Graddick, previously GLAAD's vice-president of Programs and Communications, to the presidency on April 15, 2012. Graddick is the younger son of Charles Graddick of Mobile, a circuit court judge and the former attorney general of Alabama.

=== 2013 name change ===
On March 24, 2013, GLAAD announced that they had formally dropped "Gay & Lesbian Alliance Against Defamation" from their name and would now be known only as GLAAD to reflect their work more accurately. The name change was a commitment to incorporate bisexual and transgender people in their efforts to support the LGBTQ+ community in its entirety. Jennifer Finney Boylan was chosen as the first openly transgender co-chair of GLAAD's National Board of Directors.

=== Executives ===
Sarah Kate Ellis is the current president and CEO of GLAAD. Ellis took the positions in 2014 and under her leadership GLAAD's revenue grew by 38%. In 2015, Ellis promoted Nick Adams to the newly created position of director of transgender media & representation. Adams started working at GLAAD in 1998 and had previously been GLAAD's director of communications & special projects.

In 2022, Ellis renegotiated her contract with GLAAD, receiving a $150,000 signing bonus and a base salary of $441,000 per year with automatic 5% annual increases through 2027, plus performance and discretionary bonuses that the New York Times reported could bring total annual compensation into the high six or low seven figures (GLAAD stated that the upper end was "practically impossible").

In August 2024, the New York Times published an investigation into a "pattern of lavish spending" at GLAAD, much of it by Ellis. Reviewing expense reports and receipts from January 2022 through June 2023, the paper reported more than 30 first class flights, stays at luxury hotels including the Waldorf Astoria, expensive car services, a $25,000 annual allowance for a summer rental in Provincetown, Massachusetts, and approximately $18,000-$20,000 to remodel Ellis's home office (including a chandelier and other furnishings). The organization also covered costs associated with a week-long stay at a seven-bedroom chalet near the World Economic Forum in Davos and travel to the Cannes Lions festival. Nonprofit experts cited by the Times said some of the spending and how it was treated may have conflicted with GLAAD's internal policies and IRS rules on executive compensation and benefits for tax-exempt organizations. Former GLAAD chief financial officer Emily Plauché had raised internal concerns about the spending.

GLAAD defended Ellis's leadership and the expenses as necessary to the organization's work, stating that some items (including the Davos lodging) were covered by external donors and that certain costs were later reimbursed or policy changes were made. A subsequent Washington Blade op-ed by former GLAAD vice-president Zeke Stokes contested the Times' reporting as "riddled with bad reporting, innuendo, lies, mistruths, facts out of context, and misinformation."

GLAAD/NY executive directors (1985–1994)

- Gregory Kolovakos (1985–1987)
- Craig Davidson (1987–1990)
- Ellen Carton (1991–1995)

GLAAD early board members/officers

- Christopher Borden Paine (1985–?)
- Amy Bauer (1986–?)

GLAAD/LA executive directors (pre-1994)

- Richard Jennings and Jehan Agrama (1989–1992)
- Peter M. Nardi (1992–1993)
- Fhag Höt (1992–1994)
- Lee Werbel (1993–1994)

Post-merger (1994–present)

- William Waybourn (as national managing director; 1995 – 1997)
- Joan M. Garry (1997 – June 2005)
- Neil Giuliano (September 2005 – June 2009)
- J. Michael Durnil (interim; June – September 2009)
- Jarrett Barrios (September 2009 – June 2011)
- Mike Thompson (acting) (June 2011 – 2012)
- Herndon Graddick (April 2012 – May 2013)
- Kurt Wentzell (June 2000 - September 2022)
- Dave Montez (May 2013 – November 2013)
- Sarah Kate Ellis (2013 – present)

Other executives

- Scott Seomin
- John Sonego

== Programs ==
=== GLAAD Media Awards ===
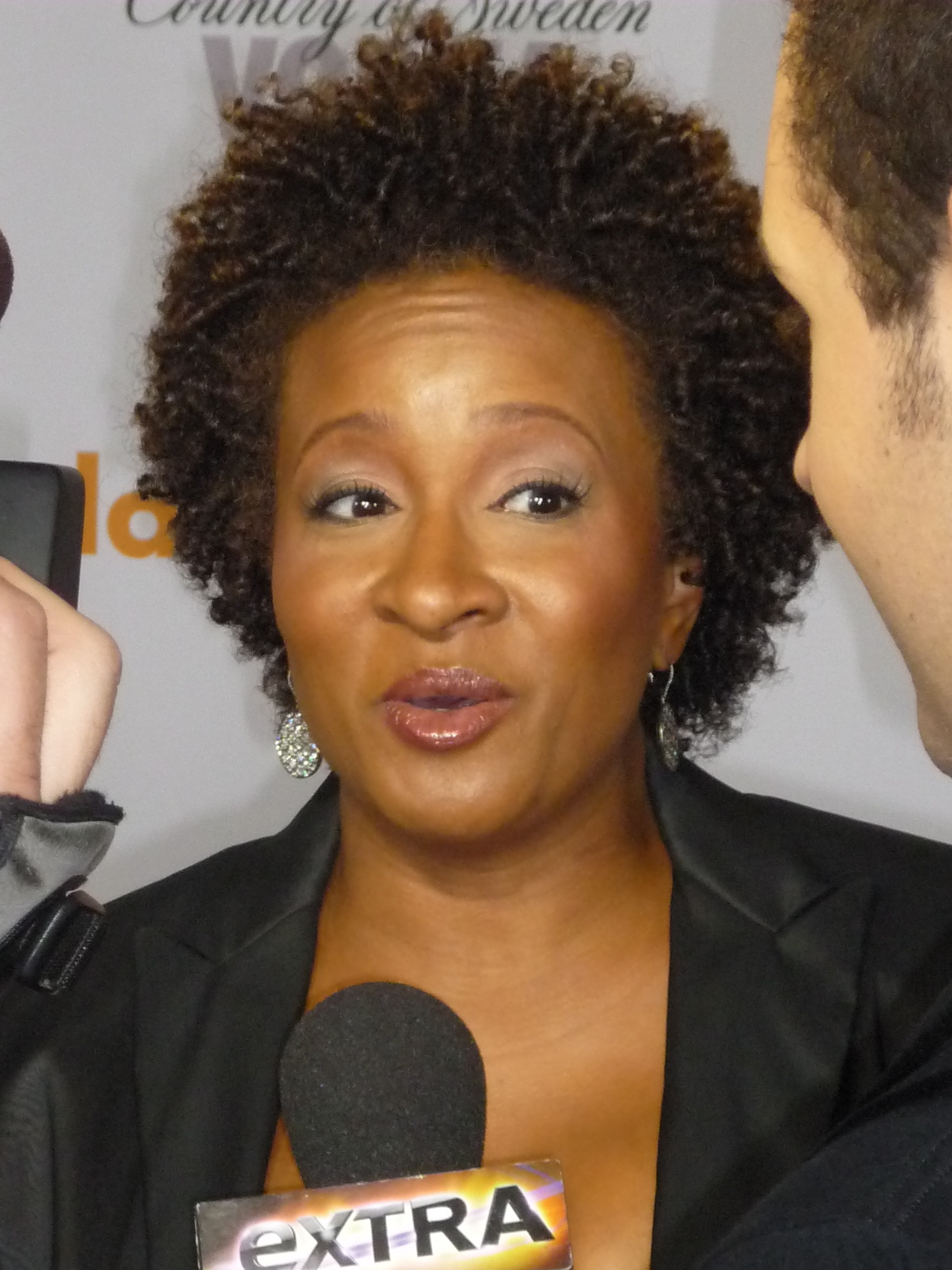
Comedian Wanda Sykes at the 2010 GLAAD Media Awards

The GLAAD Media Awards were established in 1989. Ceremonies are held annually in New York City, Los Angeles and San Francisco.

=== Announcing Equality Project ===
Established in 2002, GLAAD's Announcing Equality project has resulted in more than 1,000 newspapers including gay and lesbian announcements alongside other wedding listings.

=== Commentator Accountability Project ===
In March 2012, GLAAD launched the Commentator Accountability Project, which seeks to index and document frequent contributors, guests and pundits who regularly express anti-LGBTQ bias and misinformation in their contributions to journalism outlets.

=== Studio Responsibility Index ===
In August 2013, GLAAD launched its first annual Studio Responsibility Index, which indexes "the quantity, quality and diversity of images of LGBTQ people in films released by six major motion picture studios".

=== GLAAD Media Reference Guide ===
The GLAAD Media Reference Guide is a style guide of recommendations for writers, especially journalistic outlets, to reference in positive, inclusive depiction of LGBTQ people. It has been published since the 1990s (then known as the GLAAD Media Guide to the Lesbian and Gay Community), with the 11th edition, being the most recent, published in 2022.

=== Social Media Safety Index ===
The 2021 GLAAD Social Media Safety Index, based on an analysis of Facebook, Instagram, TikTok, Twitter and YouTube, assessed that social media was "effectively unsafe for LGBTQ users."

== Campaigns ==
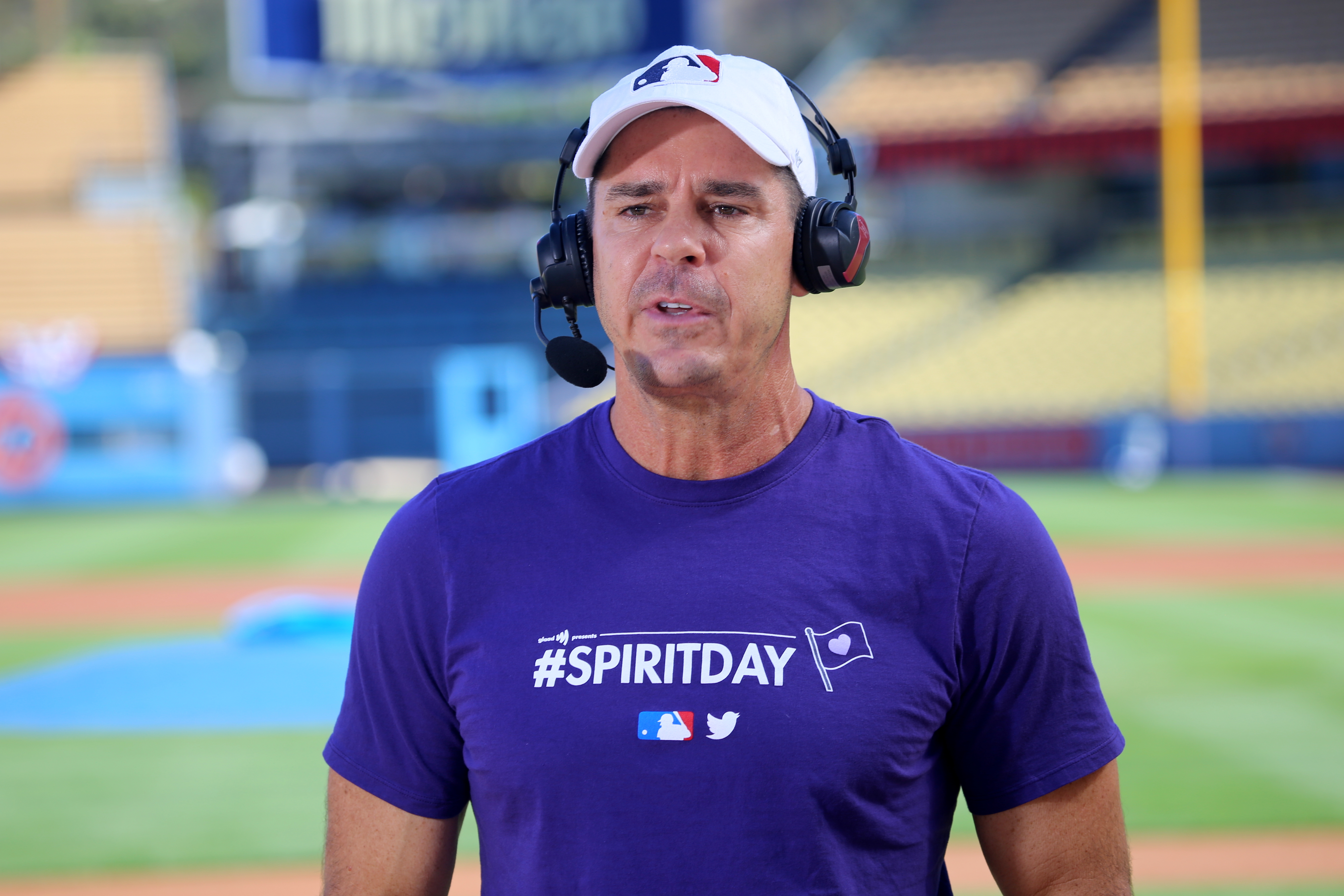
Billy Bean, MLB's VP of social responsibility and inclusion, discusses #SpiritDay with MLB Network.

Spirit Day

In 2010, GLAAD launched Spirit Day with Canadian teenager Brittany McMillan. Spirit Day is a national day of action, observed annually on the third Thursday in October, to show LGBTQ youth that they are not alone.

In 2016, Spirit Day was the world's largest and most visible anti-bullying campaign. The campaign works to bring anti-bullying resources to classrooms all around the world by inspiring educators to take action against bullying through hosting events and rallies. The campaign also created a GLAAD's Spirit Day kit for use in classrooms, which is available in 6 languages.

On social media, people are encouraged to wear purple or go purple online in order to stand united against bullying. Large media companies such as NBC Universal and Viacom show support for Spirit Day on the airwaves, and change their on-air logo to purple for the day. They also enlist people who wear purple during the day's broadcast. The hashtag #Spirit Day has become a trending topic on Twitter and Facebook every year. On social media, people such as Oprah Winfrey, Ellen DeGeneres and President Barack Obama have shown their support for the campaign.

Past Campaigns

In 2017, GLAAD launched the Together Movement, which encouraged all to join in support of those discriminated against including women, Muslims, immigrants and members of the LGBTQ+ community.

== Media consultation ==
GLAAD regularly works with companies and studios in a consultative role to help with the depiction of LGBTQ characters and themes in specific projects.

TV and Film

In 2023, GLAAD began consulting with the producers of the Netflix documentary Will & Harper before it was submitted to the Sundance Film Festival. The documentary is about Will Ferrell and his close friend Harper Steele as they drive cross-country following Harper's disclosure that she is a transgender woman. Director Josh Greenbaum said "We partnered with GLAAD on this film, and they were really helpful in giving us feedback as we’re bringing the film out in the world."

In 2021, GLAAD helped Oprah Winfrey prepare for the first TV interview with Elliot Page, after disclosing that he is transgender. "I was more nervous about this interview than anything. I wanted to get it right," Oprah told GLAAD's Nick Adams over Zoom following the interview.

In 2019, the third season of the animated television series Young Justice consulted GLAAD on the subject of representing minority characters and narratives.

In 2004, Fox provided GLAAD with an advance copy of their reality television special Seriously, Dude, I'm Gay for review. Upon review of the special, GLAAD condemned it as "an exercise in systematic humiliation." The special was shelved only hours before a scheduled meeting between GLAAD and Fox entertainment president Gail Berman to discuss the network's on-air depictions of gay men. Ray Giuliani, an executive producer of Seriously, Dude, I'm Gay, largely attributed the special's cancellation to pressures that Fox faced from GLAAD. Following the cancellation of the special, Fox organized another meeting with GLAAD for discussion over how to improve their on-air representations of the LGBTQ community. Following the cancellation of Seriously, Dude, I'm Gay the executive producers of the TBS series He's a Lady consulted GLAAD for review of the transgender representation in their own program.

Gaming

Tell Me Why is an episodic narrative adventure game developed by French studio Dontnod Entertainment and published by Xbox Game Studios in 2020. The game focuses on twin siblings Alyson and Tyler Ronan, who is a transgender man. Tell Me Why was the first playable Triple-A game to feature a transgender protagonist. GLAAD helped in creating Tyler's character, with the game's director Florent Guillaume described GLAAD as "invaluable" in developing Tyler's character and making him a "realistic hero". GLAAD's Nick Adams served as consultant who, amongst other areas, helped ensure that Tyler would be played by a trans actor; August Black. Adams described authentic representations of trans people in media as a "powerful tool for acceptance and understanding".

The crossover fighting game Street Fighter X Tekken, developed by Japanese video game developer and publisher Capcom, was released in 2012. The game features Poison, who is a transgender woman, as a playable character. GLAAD worked with Capcom on the game's script "to ensure that gaming’s most famous transgender character was portrayed with respect" and that "anything that might be offensive has been very tailored to not be."

== See also ==
- All About Trans
- List of LGBTQ rights organizations
- Transgender Day of Remembrance
- Trans Media Watch
- Violence against LGBTQ people
