= Judy Bowenwiener =

American transgender activist

- Born: September 3, 1944 (age 81)
- Other name: Judy Bowen Wiener
- Occupations: Trans Rights Activist; Journalist
- Organization(s): Transsexuals and Transvestites, Transsexual Anonymous

Judy Bowenwiener (born September 3, 1944), also known as Judy Bowen, is an American transgender rights activist. She was active in the LGBTQ scene in Greenwich Village and marched with the Gay Activists Alliance in the Christopher Street Liberation Day March. She founded multiple organisations dedicated to the transgender community. Nowadays, she is active in Nevada where she works alongside various agencies also related to the transgender community.

== Personal life ==
Bowenwiener grew up in Knoxville, Tennessee, where she realized very early on that she was transgender. She moved from Tennessee to New York City in the 1960s and became active in the Greenwich Village LGBTQ scene.In 1967, she moved to Christopher Street in the West Village neighborhood of New York. That same year, she consulted Dr. Harry Benjamin, an endocrinologist and sexologist known for his work with transgender people, who helped her in her transition. Following her gender affirming surgery, she suffered complications and legally sued her doctor for malpractice.

After her arrest at the Long Island gay club, she was bailed out by the people she was living with, who subsequently kicked her out. This left her with no place to live in until she met Philip Brea, who allowed her to stay at his apartment while he was away.

In 1999, she moved to Las Vegas Nevada, where she still resides today.

Bowenwiener grew up a Christian and still considers herself to be religious to this day.

== Career ==
As a teenager, she wrote for an evangelical newspaper called The Daily Beacon. She then received a scholarship to study journalism at the University of Tennessee. In the 1970s, she co-founded the Weekly Queens Gazette, a New York based newspaper.

Bowenwiener had a small career as an actor in the 90s: She acted in the 1993 TV Show “You Wrote it, You Watch it”, in the fifth episode of season one. She also appeared as herself in a waitress role in the short film “Café”(1990), and in the adult video “New York’s Finest” (1998), also as a waitress.

She initially worked in clubs owned by the mafia, one of which was the Tango palace in New York City, but at the advice of a friend who was an attorney, sought other business opportunities.

== Activism ==
In the 1960s she became active in the Greenwich Village LGBTQ scene. She marched with the Gay Activists Alliance in the Christopher Street Liberation Day March. During this time, she met with influential LGBTQ figures including Andy Warhol, Candy Darling, Sylvia Rivera, and Marsha P. Johnson.

In 1970, she founded and presided over Transvestites and Transsexuals (TAT), in New York City, but the group only lasted a few months. Bowenwiener had different political opinion from transvestites (mostly drag queens) whom she considered too radical in their want for gay liberation. She claimed that transsexual individuals wanted to be accepted as their chosen gender by society more than they wanted gay liberation. In 1971, she created the group Transsexuals Anonymous, which was dedicated to trans individuals. The first meeting of Transexuals Anonymous was held in the office of the plastic surgeon Benito Rish, and was attended by about twenty people, most of whom were male to female individuals.

During a police raid at a Long Island gay club, multiple people were arrested, including Bowenwiener. The violent arrest left her bruised up for three months. This event, amongst many, is what pushed her to get more involved in trans rights activism.

In 1999, after she moved to Las Vegas, she became an active member of the LGBTQ+ Center of Southern Nevada and pushed for the creation of the Safety Dorm for unhoused transgender people at The Salvation Army. She is a part of Trans United, an international group that works to increase communication among transgender individuals and organizations.

She was a recipient of the Las Vegas 2023 Trans Icon Award, the 2024 Miss International Queen USA Guiding Light Award.
