= Jeanne Manford =

American schoolteacher and activist

Jeanne Sobelson Manford
- Born: December 4, 1920; Flushing, Queens, New York
- Died: January 8, 2013 (aged 92); Daly City, California
- Known for: co-founder of PFLAG

Jeanne Sobelson Manford (December 4, 1920 – January 8, 2013) was an American schoolteacher and activist. She co-founded the support group organization, PFLAG, for which she was awarded the 2012 Presidential Citizens Medal.

== Family ==
Born Jean Sobelson in Flushing, Queens in 1920, the third of five daughters of Sadie, a housewife, and Charles Sobelson, a salesman, she studied for a short time in Alabama before stopping her studies to return home after her father's death. She married Jules Manford, had three children (Charles, Morty and Suzanne) and returned to college in her 30s, earning her bachelor's degree from Queens College and joining the faculty of PS 32 in Queens in 1964. She lived in New York until 1996 when she moved to Minnesota to care for her great-grandchild while her granddaughter attended medical school. She then went on to live with her daughter in California.

== Founding of PFLAG ==
I have a homosexual son and I love him.

— Jeanne Manford, Letter to the Editor, New York Post, April 29, 1972

In April 1972, Manford and her husband Jules were at home in Flushing, Queens, when they learned from a hospital's telephone call that her son Morty Manford, a gay activist, had been beaten while distributing flyers inside the fiftieth annual Inner Circle dinner, a political gathering in New York City. Reports stated that Morty was "kicked and stomped" while being led away by police. In response, she wrote a letter of protest to the New York Post that identified herself as the mother of a gay protester and complained of police inaction. She gave interviews to radio and television shows in several cities in the weeks that followed, always accompanied by her husband or son.

On June 25, she participated with her son in the New York Pride March, carrying a hand-lettered sign that read "Parents of Gays Unite in Support for Our Children". At the time, homosexuality was still considered a mental illness and sodomy a crime, and California Senator Mark Leno has subsequently reflected that "[f]or her to step into the street to declare support for her mentally ill, outlaw son - that was no small act ... But it was what a mother's love does." Manford recalled in a 1996 interview the cheers she received in the parade, and that the "young people were hugging me, kissing me, screaming, asking if I would talk to their parents ... [as] few of them were out to their parents for fear of rejection." Prompted by this enthusiastic reception, Manford and her husband developed an idea for an organization of the parents of gays and lesbians that could be, she later said, "a bridge between the gay community and the heterosexual community". They were soon holding meetings for such parents, with her husband participating as well. She called him "a very articulate person ... a much better speaker than I. He was right along with me on everything." The first meeting of the group—then called Parents of Gays—was attended by about 20 people, and was held at the Metropolitan-Duane Methodist Church, now the Church of the Village.

Morty's attacker went on to testify for gay rights on behalf of teamsters' union president Barry Feinstein more than a decade later, and formed a cordial relationship with Morty, regularly joining him for coffee and pastry.

== Later life ==
President Obama speaking at the 2009 Human Rights Campaign dinner

In June 1991, Manford was grand marshal of New York City's Gay Pride March. In 1993, she was the grand marshal of the first pride parade in Queens and organized a local chapter of PFLAG in Astoria. After teaching at Flushing's PS 32 for 26 years, Manford retired in 1990 at 70 years of age. Her son Morty, who became an assistant New York State attorney general, died of AIDS at age 41 in 1992, while her son Charles had died in 1966 and her husband Jules had died in 1982. She relocated to Rochester, Minnesota, in 1996 to be near her family. In October 2009, U.S. President Barack Obama recounted Manford's founding of PFLAG in a televised speech before the annual Human Rights Campaign dinner.

Jeanne Manford died at home in Daly City, California, on January 8, 2013, aged 92. A collection of Manford's papers is archived at the New York Public Library. James Martin, Catholic Jesuit priest and editor of America, paid tribute to her: "No matter what you think about the hot-button issue of same-sex marriage, no matter what religion you are, no matter what political party you favor, I hope that you say a prayer for Mrs. Manford. For she loved prophetically."

== Honors and legacy ==
In June 1991, Manford was grand marshal of New York City's Gay Pride March.

In 1993, she was the grand marshal of the first pride parade in Queens, New York.

In February 2013, it was announced that President Barack Obama was to honor Manford posthumously with the 2012 Presidential Citizens Medal, the second highest civilian award given by the United States, for her work in co-founding PFLAG and ongoing years of LGBT advocacy. She was one of 18 Americans selected to receive the award from more than 6000 nominations. It recognizes "exemplary deeds of service for their country and their fellow citizens". On February 15, 2013, Manford's daughter, Suzanne Manford Swan, accepted the award on her behalf at a White House ceremony at which Obama said: "These folks participate, they get involved, they have a point of view. They don't just wait for somebody else to do something, they go out there and do it, and they join and they become part of groups and they mobilize and they organize." The President described the founding of PFLAG and continued: "This was back in 1972. There was a lot of hate, a lot of vitriol toward gays and lesbians and anyone who supported them. But instead, she wrote to the local newspaper and took to the streets with a simple message: No matter who her son was — no matter who he loved — she loved him, and wouldn't put up with this kind of nonsense". He said "that simple act" provided the impetus for a national organization "that has given so much support to parents and families and friends, and helped to change this country".

On April 26, 2014, 171st Street between 33rd and 35th Avenues in the Flushing neighborhood of Queens, New York, was named "Jeanne, Jules, Morty Manford PFLAG Way".

On May 20, 2017, the US Post Office-Jackson Heights Station was dedicated to Jeanne and Jules Manford.

In June 2019, Manford was one of the inaugural fifty American "pioneers, trailblazers, and heroes" inducted on the National LGBTQ Wall of Honor within the Stonewall National Monument (SNM) in New York City’s Stonewall Inn. The SNM is the first U.S. national monument dedicated to LGBTQ rights and history, and the wall's unveiling was timed to take place during the 50th anniversary of the Stonewall riots.

Season 1, episode 6 of the podcast Making Gay History is about Manford and her son Morty, and season 3, episode 11 of that podcast is solely about Morty. She has spoken concerning her son and the founding of PFLAG on the podcast All Gay Long.
