= Morty Manford =

American gay rights activist (1950–1992)

Jeanne Sobelson Manford
- Born: December 4, 1950; Flushing, Queens, New York
- Died: May 14, 1992 (aged 41); Flushing, Queens, New York

Morty Manford (September 17, 1950 — May 14, 1992) was an American gay rights activist who served as assistant Attorney General of New York.

== Early life ==
Manford was born in 1950 to Jules and Jeanne Manford. His mother was an activist who founded the predecessor of Parents and Friends of Lesbians and Gays (later shortened to PFLAG). Morty Manford attended Bayside High School in Queens. As an undergraduate student at Columbia University, Manford and Robert Martin founded Gay People at Columbia University as one of the first campus groups for LGBTQ people in the United States. The original space in Furnald Hall was moved to the Stephen Donaldson Lounge in Schapiro Hall in September 2017, named after Martin's alias.

On his 21st birthday in 1971, Manford interrupted a speech by New York City Mayor John Lindsay to protest the New York City Police Department's violent raids on businesses that catered to LGBTQ patrons. After the 1973 UpStairs Lounge arson attack in New Orleans, Manford and Morris Kight traveled to Louisiana to establish a memorial fund. After graduating from Columbia in 1975, he attended the Benjamin N. Cardozo School of Law.

== Activism ==
After involvement with the 1969 Stonewall riots, Manford founded the Gay Activists Alliance as its inaugural president. In 1972, Manford led a protest of the Inner Circle's annual dinner, leading firefighter Michael Maye to violently attack Manford. While a judge ultimately acquitted Maye of state charges, the incident raised public support for the eventual passage of the New York City Gay Rights Bill of 1986.

From 1981 to 1985, Manford worked for The Legal Aid Society, followed by work as assistant Attorney General of New York until his death from complications from HIV/AIDS on May 14, 1992, at his home in Flushing, Queens. Later that month, journalist Anna Quindlen opined in The New York Times that Jeanne Manford's lifelong support for her son represented an ideal for all parents. In 1993, Jeanne donated her son's papers to the New York Public Library.
