= PFLAG China =

- 同性恋亲友会
- Abbreviation: 亲友会
- Formation: 2008
- Founder: Hu Zhijun, Wu Youjian
- Type: NGO
- Purpose: serve and support LGBT individuals in China
- Headquarters: Guangzhou, Guangdong, China
- Region served: People's Republic of China
- Chief Executive Officer: Hu Zhijun
- Website: http://www.pflag.org.cn

PFLAG China (同性恋亲友会 in Chinese), founded in Guangzhou on June 28, 2008, is an NGO formed by LGBT individuals, their parents, friends and supporters to serve and support LGBT people. PFLAG China is an independent organization, named after the American organization called PFLAG.

== History ==
- June 28, 2008
  - Founded in Guangzhou, China;
- January 2009
  - Held 1st National LGBT Conference in Guangzhou, China
- December 2009
  - Held 2nd National LGBT Conference in Guangzhou, China
- August 2010
  - Held 3rd National LGBT Conference in Beijing, China
- August, 2011
  - Launched Guangzhou office
- October 2011
  - Held 4th National LGBT Conference in Guangzhou
- November 2011
  - Held Regional LGBT Conference in Wuhan, Hubei Province
- February 2012
  - Launched first 400 Hotline for LGBT people
- April 2012
  - Held Regional LGBT Conference in Hangzhou, Zhejiang Province
- June 2012
  - Held Regional LGBT Conference in Shenyang, Liaoning Province
- September 2012
  - Held 5th National LGBT Conference in Chengdu, China

=== National LGBT Conference ===
PFLAG China holds a National LGBT Conference annually in different cities of China from 2009. The Conference provides a chance for LGBT people, their parents and friends to communicate together, help LGBT individuals to be accepted by parents and friends and improve their self-identity. The Conference also attracts more LGBT people, parents and friends to participate in LGBT Rights movement, and creates more healthy and dignified social environment.

=== 400 Hotline ===
PFLAG China launched the first 400 hotline for LGBT people and their parents. It is answered by parents of gays and lesbians as well as psychiatrists in order to provide correct information and support to help them with their difficulties.

== See also ==
- China Rainbow Media Awards
- LGBT rights in the People's Republic of China
