= China Rainbow Media Awards =

The China Rainbow Media Awards is a series of awards given to media artisans and publication outlets for their coverage or featuring of lesbian, gay, bisexual and transgender people in the People's Republic of China. It is organized by the Aibai Culture & Education Center and the Beijing Gender Health Education Institute, and the inaugural ceremony was held on December 9, 2011, in Beijing.

== Presenters ==
Among the presenters for the 2011 event was a 72-year-old man named Old Paris who was jailed 3 times in his life by the government for his homosexuality (under the "hooliganism" charge). Old Paris presented the Special Contribution Award to sexologist and National People's Congress member Li Yinhe. Li, who was part of the organizing committee for the event, was not able to attend, but submitted a video expressing her support.

Another presenter at the 2011 ceremony was Lu Rong (also known as "Auntie Ou"), a 61-year-old retired worker who had recently obtained Internet access and became an acquaintance to gay men online. She is the author of "Those Gay Children of Mine", which was published in 2011, and is a member of the Beijing chapter of PFLAG China.

== 2011 winners ==
=== Best news reports ===
- Newspaper: China's first research report on domestic violence among lesbians indicates issues that can't be ignored, Du Xiao, Legal Weekly
- Magazine: Homosexual Spouses report series, Hong Hu et al., Southern Metropolis Weekly
- Television: "Grasp a Dream", Phoenix Television
- Internet: "Women Submitting Proposals", Wangyi Nvren Pindao
- English: "The Loveless Marriages of China's Gay Men", Yang Dingdu et al., Xinhua News

=== LGBT Salute Awards ===
- Newspaper: Southern Weekend and the China Daily
- Magazine: Time Out and Southern Metropolis Weekly
- Columns: Dinah Gardner, for her columns in Time Out

=== Other awards ===
- Special Contribution Award: Li Yinhe

== 2016 Winners ==
=== Best news reports ===
- Magazine/newspaper – Vista Kan Tianxia: "She Talked with Officials of the Ministry of Education about Homosexuality" in Textbooks"
- Online – Net Ease News: "Images of China's Gay Community"
- Video – Phoenix Television: "Phoenix Big Vision: In My Name – Authentic Records of the Gay Community"
- English – Global Times: "No pride on campus"
- People's Choice – NetEase News: "Seven Chinese Gay Couples Go to the United States to Marry."

The People's Choice Award was for the story of the seven same-sex couples who entered an online contest sponsored by Alibaba, and won a destination wedding to Los Angeles, where they were married by West Hollywood mayor, Leslie Horvath. GLAAD supported this campaign by sharing the story of the couples with media, as well as photos of the wedding. One couple returned to the United States in November to tell their story at the GLAAD San Francisco gala.

=== Other awards ===
- Special Contribution Award: Qiu Qiming

The Rainbow Media Awards recognized CCTV host Qiu Qiming as the China Rainbow Media Special Contribution Award. Qiming has paid attention to LGBTI issues for many years. He publicly supports LGBT communities and tirelessly promotes an accepting society; a society moving away from conservatism and traditionalism; a society embracing diversity. His programs have enabled a better public understanding of LGBTI issues, and have contributed positively to the elimination of stigma and prejudice.

In his Special Contribution Award acceptance video, Qiu Qiming states: "Discrimination itself is not that scary, yet when discrimination becomes normalized, it runs counter to justice and fairness. The gay community should be able to enjoy the sunshine, just like everybody else."

== See also ==
- GLAAD Media Award
