= Shirley Willer =

American feminist and activist

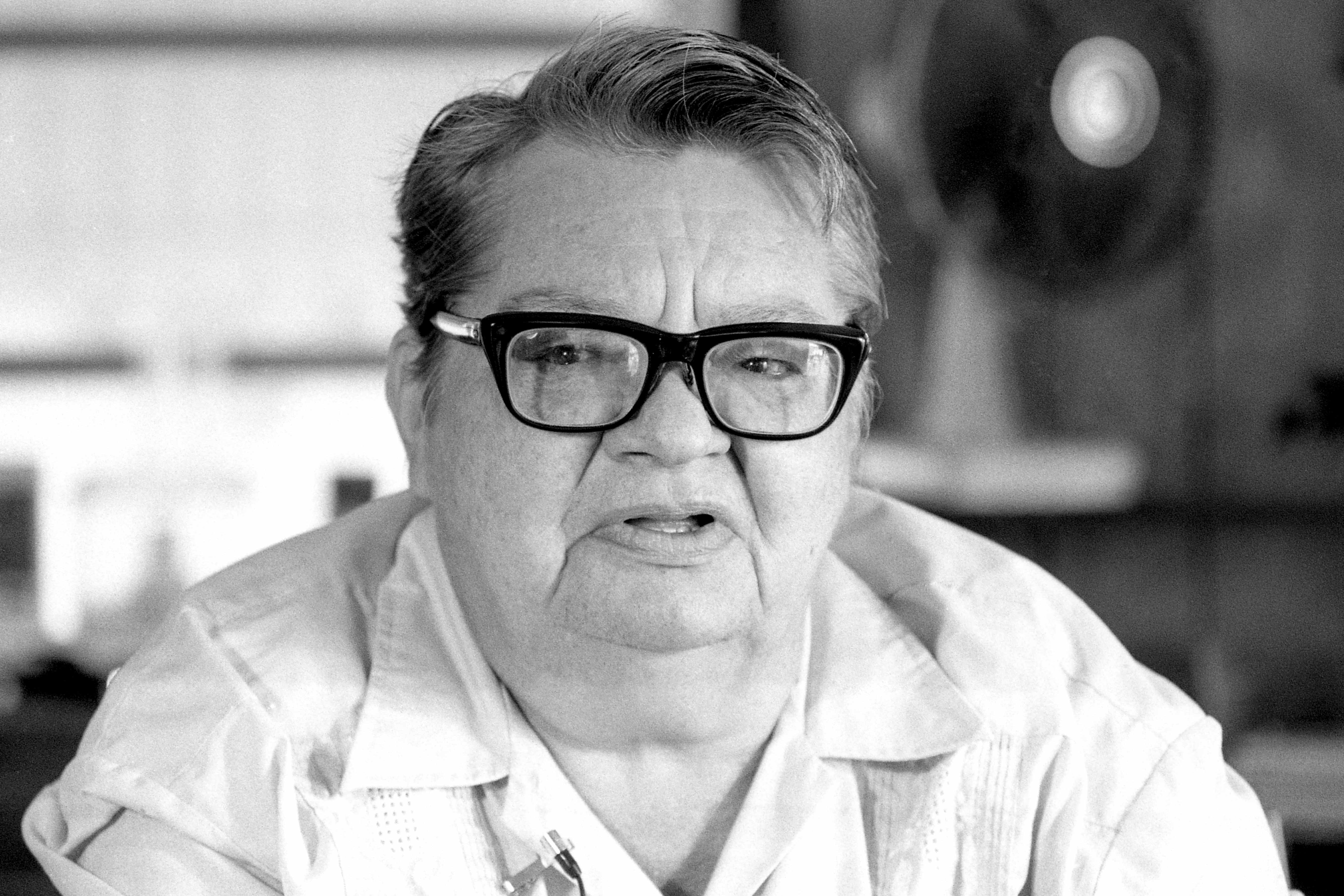
- Shirley Willer photo by Morgan Gwenwald
- Born: September 26, 1922; Chicago, Illinois, U.S.
- Died: December 31, 1991 (aged 69); Key West, Florida, U.S.
- Education: University of Chicago, University of Iowa
- Occupation: Nurse
- Movement: Lesbian and gay rights
- Partner: Marion Glass (1960s–1980s)

Shirley Willer (September 26, 1922 – December 31, 1991) was an American feminist and activist. Born in Chicago, Illinois, Willer joined the Daughters of Bilitis (DOB) in the 1950s and became the president of the organization a few years after. Because of her energy and dedication, she helped to revolutionize the homophile movement in the 1960s and helped pave the way for future civil rights advancements for the gay community.

== Family, career, and personal life ==
Shirley Willer was born on September 26, 1922, in Chicago, Illinois. Willer's family consisted of her father, Arthur C. Willer, her mother, Theresa, and her younger sister, Doris. While her father was a native of Illinois, her mother was originally from Austria and received American citizenship in 1919. Her father worked as a salesman for the Prudential Life Insurance Company in Chicago for many years before he became a judge. Arthur, a heavy drinker, often beat his wife and so, in 1931, Willer's mother packed her and her younger sister into the family car and fled. To make ends meet, her mother worked split shifts as a nurse, leaving Willer to manage household activities.

Willer obtained a bachelor's degree in nursing at the University of Chicago. She later went back to school at the University of Iowa to obtain her master's degree in nursing. In 1941, at age 19, Willer discovered she was a lesbian during a nursing class lecture about mental hygiene. The lecture discussed common terms used to describe people who find individuals of the same sex attractive. The professor stated that lesbians are not attracted to men and oftentimes develop crushes on women. Willer reflected on the lecture and realized that she was a lesbian. Later in an interview, Willer stated that at this moment, she thought to herself "Oh, gee, I'm one of those things!" She had thought everyone was like that. She never understood why other girls got excited about going out on dates when she preferred the company of other women. After the lecture, Willer spoke with her professor about identifying as a lesbian. Her professor, appalled by her statement, sent her to a psychiatrist who Willer saw for six months. When Willer returned home that evening, she came out to her mother. Disgusted, her mother stated, "Where did I go wrong?" It took a few weeks before Willer's mother began to accept the fact that her daughter was a lesbian. Willer's mother gave her the book titled The Well of Loneliness, which discussed other lesbians’ experiences on coming out. After reading through the book, Willer was disturbed to find that related words for her sexuality were described as "pervert" and "queer." She developed romantic feelings towards her cousin. Her aunt did not approve and forbid Willer to see her daughter ever again.

For most of her life, Willer worked as a registered nurse at the Albert Merritt Billings Hospital in Chicago. She often worked 16-hour shifts due to nursing shortages due to World War II. During her time as a nurse, she filled many different positions, ranging from psychiatric nursing to working with Argonne National Laboratory. Argonne National Laboratory contributed to the Manhattan Project, which helped build America's atomic bomb. After living in Chicago, Willer visited California and lived in San Francisco.

In 1962, after living in California, Willer moved to New York City. Soon after, she joined the Daughters of Bilitis (DOB), the first lesbian civil and political rights organization in the United States. During her first DOB event, she met founding member Marion Glass (also known as Meredith Grey) and they became a couple. Though Willer and Glass remained together for their entire lives, they never married. For Willer, marriage was unnecessary, "We don't believe in possession of people" she declared. However, she always emphasized the importance of commitment: "You're a couple of people who love each other... if I am stronger than you I'm going to lift that heavier thing."

Willer eventually became president of the DOB but left the organization during the late 1960s. After leaving the DOB, Willer and Glass moved to Key West, Florida, where they spent the last years of their lives together. They opened a rock shop which was quite profitable. They both took part in the growing lesbian and gay community in Key West, with Willer serving as an active member until she died of heart failure on December 31, 1999.

== Activism ==
Willer's activism was inspired by the mistreatment and violence she and her friends experienced as members of the gay community. While living in Chicago, Willer was the victim of police brutality. She was walking down Rush Street trying to go to The Seven Seas, a gay bar. The officer assumed she was gay and proceeded to harass her, picking her up by the front of her shirt and slapping her back and forth. He called her names saying, "You god-damned pervert. You queer. You S.O.B." Willer mentioned in an interview that she became so angry at the policeman that she could have killed him. Though she was angry, she was not frightened and later clearly stated that "the policeman had no right to do that to me."

In 1947, while still living in Chicago, Willer's close friend Barney was badly burned in a fire. He received inadequate treatment of his wounds by the doctors because he was known to be gay. In addition to this maltreatment, transfer to a facility that could have more adequately tended to his injuries was delayed, and he died as a result. Later Willer commented, "I think anybody who calls themselves an American, who believes in any kind of religion, to deliberately allow someone to die or force them into a position where they're going to die, it's unforgivable."

These injustices, and Barney's death in particular, inspired Willer to advocate for lesbian and gay rights. She was a proudly out lesbian and refused to work for anyone who did not accept her sexuality. She hoped to inspire others, especially young people, to be similarly open about their sexuality—even in the face of parental anger and rejection. Always compassionate, Willer opened up her apartment in San Francisco to lesbians whose families had disowned them. "They were usually younger", Willer explained. "Their parents had thrown them out, they were on the street... I had bedrolls all over the place."

== Daughters of Bilitis ==
Some of Willer's most significant activism occurred during her time as a member and leader of the DOB. She became the president of the New York chapter in 1963 and became the National President in 1966. Willer was the first national president who did not live in San Francisco, where the DOB headquarters were located. After Willer became president of the DOB, a close friend of hers (whose name remains unknown), also a lesbian, became an anonymous sponsor of the movement. With $3,000 checks distributed to each member, the money initially contributed to the printing of The Ladder, a nationally distributed lesbian publication. To increase membership and awareness of the movement, Willer and Glass began traveling the country to advocate for gay and lesbian civil rights while opening additional chapters.

During her presidency, she held classes for psychiatrists to help them understand gay identity. As a result of this, Willer explained that before the 12 years were up the psychiatrists had removed the term lesbian from the lexicon of mental illness. Also the New York Times finally printed the word "homosexual" and not "pervert". Despite its success, the organization needed restructuring due to the lack of coordination and communication between higher-level officers.

In the late 1960s, Willer and Glass pulled the DOB out of ECHO (East Coast Homophile Organization) because its delegates voted in favor of picketing for civil liberties. Soon after, Glass challenged the vote but the national office did not comply, resulting in the DOB's permanent withdrawal from ECHO. Willer and Glass introduced a plan to decentralize the DOB and allow chapters to make their own policies. DOB members thought that the plan needed more consideration which ultimately led to Willer and Glass leaving the organization. There are conflicting opinions on whether they quit the DOB themselves or were thrown out.

== Legacy ==
During Willer's lifetime, openly gay people were subject to homophobic treatment. As a result of this, the DOB found it difficult to recruit members due to the risks of associating with homosexuals. Most lived discreetly, preferring to pass as heterosexual in public, and often even in private. Willer's openness about her relationship with Marion Glass was a dangerous move at the time. Yet the visibility of her love life endured both in and outside of the community. This openness encouraged other couples to follow her and Glass' example, increasing visibility for homosexual couples in the United States. Her work in the DOB increased acceptance of the gay community in general. She later noted a decrease in personal discrimination and police harassment as a result of the DOB's work within the New York chapter. The effect of Willer's work created a sharp distinction between older and younger generations, the former operating with discretion and the latter with open acceptance.

At Willer's encouragement, the DOB worked closely with the Mattachine Society, an LGBT civil rights organization founded in 1950 that initially focused largely on the rights of gay men. The DOB was originally created as a counterpart to this organization and to provide a space for lesbian women. Willer created general guidelines for interacting with the male section of the gay community, and despite some initial struggle, her guidelines ultimately benefited both groups. After the DOB and Mattachine Society disbanded, Willer's efforts to bring gay men and lesbians together helped to form the modern LGBT community.

During Willer's tenure as the president of the DOB, she attempted to convince the group to have a more aggressive political stance. But, despite Willer's efforts, the DOB stayed closer to its accommodationist roots. The DOB's reputation for emphasizing accommodation reduced potential membership as alternatives appeared. But the organization's failure prompted other movements to learn from its mistakes. Although decentralization played a part in the organization's downfall, it planted the seeds for the demonstration at Stonewall and the post-Stonewall gay liberation movement.

Some chapters of the DOB remained active even after The Ladder stopped production in 1972. The organization established a $4,000 need-based scholarship fund for members of the gay community. It also created a legal defense fund of $6,000, necessary for the multitude of legal penalties charged to homosexuals living in New York City at the time. Willer primarily drove the fundraiser efforts for these trusts.

Season 2, episode 2 of the podcast “Making Gay History” is about Willer.
