= Paulette Goodman =

American LGBTQ activist (1933–2021)

Paulette Goodman (June 30, 1933 – August 15, 2021) was the President of Parents, Friends and Family of Lesbians and Gays (PFLAG) from 1988 to 1992. She led the campaign to get PFLAG ads displayed on DC Metro buses.

== Life ==
Paulette Goodman was born in June 1933 to a Jewish family and grew up in Nazi-occupied Paris. Her family moved to the United States in 1949. In 1980, she moved to Silver Spring, Maryland. Her daughter came out in 1981, and Goodman helped found the Metro Washington DC-area chapter of PFLAG, PFLAG Metro DC in 1983. During her tenure, she counseled families of LGBTQ people, answered calls on the PFLAG helpline, and led the campaign to get PFLAG ads displayed on DC Metro buses.

Goodman appeared on radio, TV, and in print, and gave talks and workshops at colleges, in faith communities, and other public forums. She lobbied in Annapolis and on Capitol Hill for LGBTQ equality, and helped start PFLAG chapters in Delaware, Maryland, Virginia, and West Virginia. In 1991 Goodman was honored by the Association of Gay and Lesbian Psychiatrists for PFLAG, and with the Public Service Award of the Greater New York Bar Association for Human Rights. She also served as the DC Pride Parade Grand Marshal in 1989.

In 1989, Goodman sent a series of letters to Barbara Bush asking for her support. The first lady replied personally, stating, "I firmly believe that we cannot tolerate discrimination against any individuals or groups in our country. Such treatment always brings with it pain and perpetuates intolerance." The reply, inadvertently passed on to the Associated Press, caused a political maelstrom and may have been the first gay-positive comments to come from the White House.

In 2005 Goodman founded PFLAG Riderwood—a satellite support group under the umbrella of PFLAG Metro DC—a first-of-its-kind PFLAG group based in a retirement home at Riderwood Community. Since its founding, the group has actively inspired other support groups to start in retirement homes.

In March 2013, she received recognition for her work with PFLAG from both Montgomery County, Maryland and Martin O'Malley, the Governor of Maryland.

She died of natural causes on August 15, 2021, at the age of 88.

== Legacy ==
Season 3, episode 9 of the podcast “Making Gay History” is about her.
