= Herb Selwyn =

American attorney and businessperson

- Born: April 25, 1925; Hollywood, California, US
- Died: February 3, 2016 (aged 90)
- Education: University of California, Los Angeles; USC Gould School of Law
- Occupations: Attorney, businessperson
- Known for: LGBTQ rights advocacy
- Children: 4

Herbert E. Selwyn (April 25, 1925 - February 3, 2016) was an American attorney and businessperson. Selwyn worked as a criminal defense attorney and was counsel to the American Civil Liberties Union in the 1950s. His role as an LGBT rights advocate led to the incorporation of the first gay organization, the Mattachine Society.

== Early life and education ==
Selwyn was born on April 25, 1925, in Hollywood to Leo and Lily Seligmann. He was raised in West Hollywood, California, and graduated from Fairfax High School. Selwyn entered University of California, Los Angeles (UCLA) before enlisting in the United States Army Air Corps during World War II. Selwyn served in England, France, and Germany. He later reentered UCLA and graduated from USC Gould School of Law. Selwyn was admitted to the State Bar of California in 1950.

== Career ==
Selwyn set up a law practice and was a member of the American Civil Liberties Union (ACLU). He was a criminal defense attorney and taught at local law schools. Selwyn was passionate about civil rights, social and economic justice, and strongly opposed to the death penalty. At the request of one of his father's patients, a lesbian member of the Mattachine Society, Selwyn began providing legal support and expertise to the LGBT community. In the 1950s, he was counsel for the ACLU and assisted in the development of the organization's policy on LGBTQ rights. He assisted in incorporating the first gay organization, and helped in obtaining a permit for the first gay pride parade in Los Angeles. Selwyn served as chairman of the democratic council in California's 24th congressional district. In 1974, he was a candidate for the democratic nomination for the 24th congressional district. John Anson Ford endorsed Selwyn's candidacy. Towards the end of his career, Selwyn did arbitration and pro bono work.

== Personal life ==
Selwyn was married and had four children. He enjoyed tennis, music, reading, and travelling. Selwyn was a member of Mensa International and the Plato Society at UCLA. His son, Christopher, predeceased him. Selwyn died on February 3, 2016, after battling a long illness. He was survived by his wife, Lidia, and three children from a previous marriage.

== Legacy ==
Selwyn's role in the LGBTQ rights movement is featured in season 2, episode 7 of the podcast Making Gay History.
