= Adele Starr =

American gay rights activist

Adele Starr (February 10, 1920 – December 10, 2010) organized the Los Angeles chapter of Parents and Friends of Lesbians and Gays in 1976.

== Biography ==
Ida Seltzer, later Adele Starr, was born in Brooklyn, New York, on February 10, 1920, the daughter of an accountant and a homemaker.

Adele Starr, at the time in Brentwood, California, and a mother of five, became an activist for gay rights and marriage equality in 1974 after her second son, Philip Starr, told her he was gay.

Los Angeles P-FLAG, founded in 1976, received more than 7,500 letters requesting information. Every letter was answered by a member of the chapter.

In 1981, members decided to launch a national organization. The first PFLAG office was established in Los Angeles under founding president Adele Starr, who remained president until 1986.

She died on December 10, 2010, at 90 years old.
