= Lavender Hill Mob (gay activist group) =

Gay activist group

The Lavender Hill Mob was a militant gay rights activist group operating in the United States in the 1980s in response to the treatment of the AIDS pandemic. It was founded and led by Marty Robinson.

The Mob had a dozen members, four of them women, and in addition to Robinson included Henry Yaeger, Bill Bahlman, Michael Petrelis, Sara Belcher, Jean Elizabeth Glass and Buddy Noro. Initially known as the Swift & Terrible Retribution Committee it began to take form in summer 1986 after founders broke away from the Gay and Lesbian Alliance Against Defamation. A group of radical activists persuaded approximately 3,000 protesters at a July 1 rally against the US Supreme Court's ruling on sodomy to block traffic in Sheridan Square. Robinson and several friends then led a parade of 7,000 from Battery Park to Greenwich Village, and a demonstration by 2,500 at Lincoln Center. By fall they decided they would be more effective as a named independent group and called themselves after the British comedy film The Lavender Hill Mob.

Robinson often used political "zaps", chaotic and theatrical interventions intended to attract the attention of the press. In October 1986, the Mob disrupted the Alfred E Smith Dinner, a charity event attended by wealthy New York Roman Catholics and Cardinal John O'Connor. They distributed leaflets and shouted, "Gays and lesbians will not be silenced!" To gain entry to the dinner Robinson wrote a check but stopped payment on it before it could be cashed. In November of that year, the group disrupted a mass at St. Patrick's Cathedral in New York City. Two members dressed as priests and another nine unfurled a banner as O'Connor gave his sermon.

In February 1987, they interrupted a conference in Atlanta put on by the US federal government that included a number of other gay rights organizations, causing the event to shut down early. Some wearing gray uniform shirts with stenciled numbers and the pink triangle to evoke the internment of gays in concentration camps, the Mob accused the panelists, who were speaking on how to address the AIDS pandemic, of being Nazis and perpetrating a genocide. They were particularly concerned that the discussion did not include black and Hispanic representatives.

The group published a newsletter in 1987, Lavender Hill News. Robinson died of AIDS in March 1992.

== Works cited ==
- Faderman, Lillian (2015). The Gay Revolution: The Story of the Struggle. Simon & Schuster. ISBN 978-1-4516-9411-6.
- Kahn, Arthur D. (2005). AIDS, The Winter War: A Testing of America. Temple University Press. ISBN 978-1-56639-018-7.
