= Gregory Kolovakos =

American literary translator, best known as translator of Latin American literature

Gregory Kolovakos (July 30, 1951 – April 16, 1990) was an American literary translator and activist, best known as a translator of Latin American literature by writers such as Jorge Luis Borges, Julio Cortázar, José Donoso and Mario Vargas Llosa, and as the founding executive director of the Gay and Lesbian Alliance Against Defamation.

He was also director of the literature program for the New York State Council on the Arts, a board member of the Lesbian and Gay Community Service Center, and a founder of the AIDS Treatment Project and the PEN Fund for Writers and Editors with AIDS.

He died of AIDS on April 16, 1990, at his home in Upper East Side, Manhattan. He was survived by his partner Bruce Becker. Following his death, the PEN American Center's Gregory Kolovakos Award and the Lambda Literary Foundation's Gregory Kolovakos Award for AIDS Literature were named in his honour.
