= Tom Doerr =

American gay rights activist (1947–1987)

- Born: Thomas L. Doerr; 1947
- Died: August 2, 1987 (aged 39–40)
- Known for: Introducing the lambda symbol into the gay movement
- Partner: Marty Robinson

Thomas L. Doerr (1947 – August 2, 1987) was an American gay activist. In 1970, he introduced the lambda symbol into the gay rights movement when the image was used to represent the political work of the Gay Activists Alliance. The lambda became "a sign for gay liberation in general".

== Early life ==
Thomas L. Doerr was born in 1947 to Charles W. Doerr (1922–2002) and Elizabeth F. Doerr (1922–1994).

== Career ==
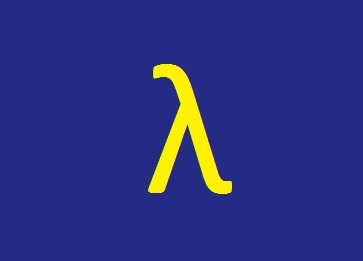
Tom Doerr's lambda

In the days after the Stonewall riots in 1969, Doerr became known as an activist who helped others understand the political implications of their actions.

He was a founding member of the Gay Activists Alliance (GAA) in New York. He introduced the lambda symbol for the gay movement. He meant the lambda to symbolize the liberation achievable through activism, the link because in chemistry, the lambda is a sign for a catalyst and in Doerr's concept, it symbolized an "exchange of energy." Originally, the sign was colored chrome yellow – a reference to the Aldous Huxley novel Crome Yellow – on a dark blue field.

In 1970, ten GAA members occupied the Republican State Committee headquarters to demand that Governor Nelson Rockefeller support gay rights. A Kay Lahusen photo shows Marty Robinson and Tom Doerr snuggling under an American flag.

== Personal life ==
Tom Doerr was a lover of Martin "Marty" Robinson (1943–1992). Born in Brooklyn, Robinson attended New York University and worked as a union carpenter. Robinson, writing Doerr's obituary, said:

Anything that I had been able to contribute towards human liberation (self-acceptance) came from his love. I and many of your friends, Tom, will find it much harder to stumble on without you. A somewhat reticent, gentle prophet died this week... We are crushed at losing you... Fortified in having known you.

Doerr died on August 2, 1987, and is buried with his parents at Centre County Memorial Park, State College, Pennsylvania.

Vito Russo designed the panel honoring Tom Doerr for the NAMES Project AIDS Memorial Quilt, a blue shirt with the lambda yellow sign and underneath it the words: "In memory of Tom Doerr, who designed the Lambda as the symbol of the Gay Liberation Movement".
