= United States Post Office (Jackson Heights, Queens) =

Historic post office in Queens, New York

- US Post Office-Jackson Heights Station
- U.S. National Register of Historic Places
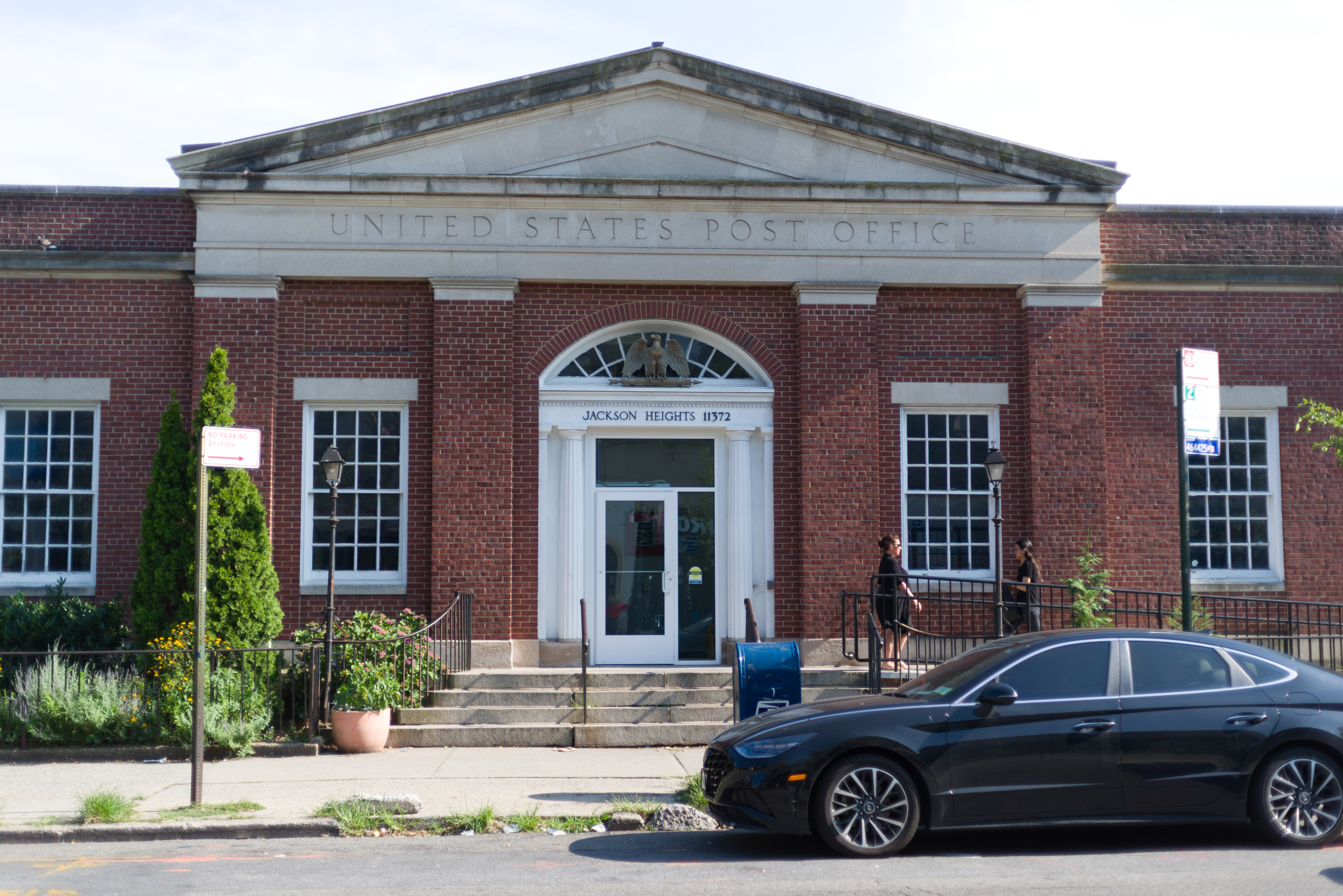

- Location within New York City Location within New York Location within the United States
- Location: 7802 37th Ave., Jackson Heights, Queens
- Coordinates: 40°44′57″N 73°53′15″W
- Area: less than one acre
- Built: 1936
- Architect: Benjamin C. Flournoy, Peppino Mangravite
- Architectural style: Colonial Revival
- MPS: US Post Offices in New York State, 1858-1943, TR
- NRHP reference No.: 88002504
- Added to NRHP: November 17, 1988

US Post Office-Jackson Heights Station is a historic post office building located at Jackson Heights in Queens County, New York, United States. The original section was built in 1936–1937, and was designed by architect Benjamin C. Flournoy (1876-ca. 1939) as a consultant to the Office of the Supervising Architect. The original section is a symmetrically massed one story brick building with a nine bay wide principal facade in the Colonial Revival style. It features a three bay entrance pavilion with four simple brick Doric order pilasters which support a limestone triangular pediment. The building was extended four bays to the east in 1964. The interior features a 1940 mural by Peppino Mangravite depicting scenes from the history of Jackson Heights.

It was listed on the National Register of Historic Places in 1988.

In 2021 the post office was featured in an episode of Sesame Street.
