= PFLAG =

American LGBTQ organization

PFLAG National
- Formation: March 11, 1973
- Founder: Jeanne Manford
- Founded at: New York City, US
- Purpose: LGBTQ activism
- Headquarters: Washington, D.C.
- Region served: United States
- Method: Campaigning; advocacy; support groups; public speaking; education
- Website: Official website

PFLAG is an LGBTQ advocacy organization founded and led by friends and family of LGBTQ people. PFLAG is a national organization presiding over decentralized local and regional chapters. PFLAG has over 360 chapters across the United States, with more than 550,000 members and supporters.

PFLAG (pronounced /ˈpiːflæɡ/ PEE-flag) was originally an acronym, standing for Parents and Families of Lesbians and Gays (later broadened to Parents, Families and Friends of Lesbians and Gays). Until 1993, the name was hyphenated as P-FLAG. In 2014, the organization's members voted to make PFLAG the group's only official name and drop the phrase for which it previously stood, citing wider advocacy for groups beyond homosexual people.

== History ==
Jeanne Manford marching with her later famous sign. Reactions to this sign led Manford to create a support group, which evolved into PFLAG.

The organization was founded by Jeanne Manford and her husband after their son, a gay man and gay rights activist, was beaten at a protest in 1972. On June 25, she participated with her son in the NYC Pride March, carrying a hand-lettered sign that read "Parents of Gays Unite in Support for Our Children". Manford soon founded the organization as "a bridge between the gay community and the heterosexual community".

The first formal meeting of Parents of Gays (later PFLAG) took place on March 11, 1973, at the Metropolitan-Duane United Methodist Church in Greenwich Village (MDUMC – later the Church of the Village). Approximately 20 people attended. Rev. Ed Egan of MDUMC (1971–1977) was one of the founding members of "Parents of Gays". Parents of Gays continued to meet monthly at MDUMC until at least 1984.

The organization spread through regional chapters. In 1976, PFLAG LA had their first meeting of 30 parents. Following the 1979 National March on Washington for Lesbian and Gay Rights, representatives from these groups met for the first time in Washington, DC.

By 1980, PFLAG, then known as Parents FLAG, began to distribute information to educational institutions and communities of faith nationwide, establishing itself as a source of information for the general public. In 1981, members decided to launch a national organization. The first PFLAG office was established in Los Angeles under founding president Adele Starr.

In 1982, the Federation of Parents and Friends of Lesbians and Gays, Inc., then representing some 20 groups, was incorporated in California and granted nonprofit, tax-exempt status. In 1987, PFLAG relocated to Denver, under President Elinor Lewallen. During this time, PFLAG began advocating for lesbians and gay men in the military, where they were still formally banned under the Don't Ask Don't Tell rules. PFLAG expanded to new communities in this time, including rural areas.

In 1990, following a period of significant growth, PFLAG employed an Executive Director, expanded its staff, and moved to Washington, DC. Also in 1990, PFLAG President Paulette Goodman sent a letter to Barbara Bush asking for Mrs. Bush's support. Bush's letter was inadvertently given to the Associated Press, leading to significant controversy for its perceived support of PFLAG.

PFLAG later expanded its advocacy to include bisexual and transgender people. In particular, in 1998, gender identity, including transgender people, was added to the mission of PFLAG after a vote at their annual meeting in San Francisco. PFLAG was the first national LGBTQ organization to officially adopt a transgender-inclusive policy. In 2002, PFLAG's Transgender Network, also known as TNET, became PFLAG's first official "Special Affiliate", recognized with the same privileges and responsibilities as regular chapters. In 2013, TNET was replaced by the Transgender and Gender Nonconforming (TGNC) Advisory Council.

In 2004, PFLAG/Chicago was inducted into the Chicago Gay and Lesbian Hall of Fame as a Friend of the Community.

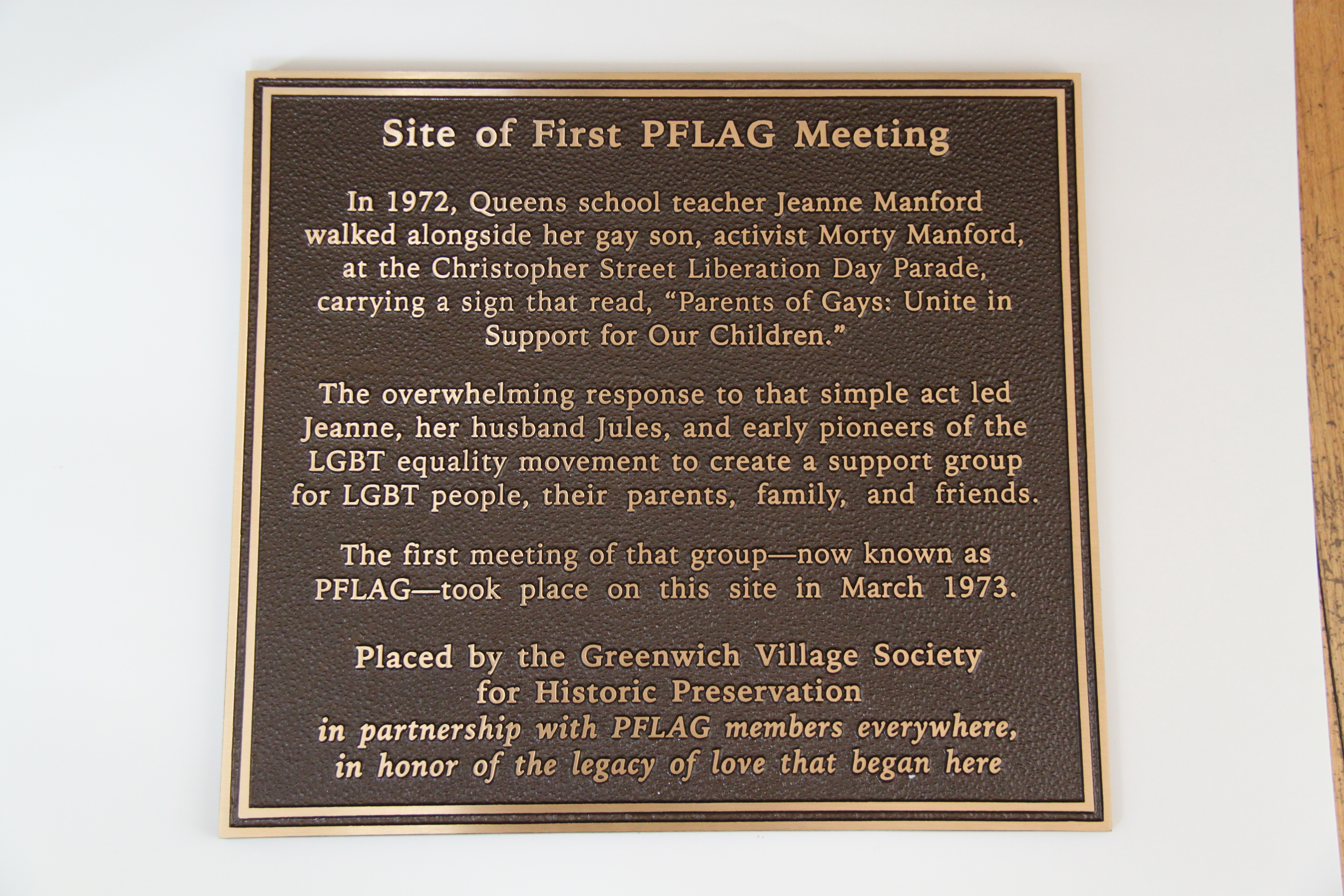
The plaque unveiled by Greenwich Village Society for Historic Preservation in 2013 at Church of the Village

In 2013, Jeanne Manford was awarded the Presidential Citizens Medal by then President Barack Obama.

In 2013, a bronze plaque was installed at The Church of the Village in Greenwich Village, memorializing the first meeting of PFLAG at the church. The plaque reads,

In 1972, Queens schoolteacher Jeanne Manford walked alongside her gay son, activist Morty Manford, at the 1972 Christopher Street Liberation Day Parade, carrying a sign that read 'Parents of Gays: Unite in Support of Our Children.' The overwhelming response to that simple act led Jeanne, her husband Jules, and early pioneers of the LGBTQ equality movement to create a support group for LGBTQ people, their parents, family, and friends. The first meeting of that group—now known as PFLAG—took place on this site in March 1973. Placed by the Greenwich Village Society for Historic Preservation in partnership with PFLAG members everywhere, in honor of the legacy of love that began here.

In 2017, PFLAG celebrated the 45th anniversary of founder Jeanne Manford's famous march with her son, gay-rights activist Morty Manford.

== Programs ==
Straight for Equality is a national outreach and education project created by PFLAG National to empower new straight allies and trans allies who, unlike a more traditional PFLAG member, do not necessarily have a family or friend connection to the LGBTQ community. The Straight for Equality project was launched in 2007. This nationwide initiative expanded the organization's efforts to include more people in the equality movement. Since its launch, Straight for Equality in the Workplace has been PFLAG's most successful initiative, with an array of workshops available to corporations in the US. In 2009, PFLAG launched Straight for Equality in Healthcare to educate and engage healthcare providers in all disciplines to be more culturally inclusive in their work. In 2012, PFLAG launched Straight for Equality in Faith Communities, which features faith-focused resources and tools for people of all denominations to start having critical conversations in their faith communities to create more welcoming institutions. And in 2014, PFLAG launched a new trans ally program through Straight for Equality.

Each year since 2009, PFLAG National has held the Straight for Equality Awards Gala, the only awards gala that exclusively celebrates the contributions of straight allies to the movement for LGBTQ equality. Past winners include civil rights pioneers, including: Maya Angelou and Johnnetta B. Cole; entertainer Liza Minnelli; actors Rosie Perez, Patrick Stewart, Martha Plimpton, and Sigourney Weaver; Broadway stars Audra McDonald and Will Swenson; sports icons Brendon Ayanbadejo, Scott Fujita, Chris Kluwe, and Hudson Taylor; authors Charlaine Harris and John Irving; faith leaders like Jay Bakker; and organizations including IBM, KPMG, MetLife, Sodexo, and Whirlpool.

The Faith in Our Families program provides "practical approaches for maintaining faith while supporting a child", whereas its Our Children support group offers Q&A sessions for parents. PFLAG also holds local chapter meetings for parents of faith, helping them navigate ways to preserve religious beliefs while supporting their children.

PFLAG Connects was created in April 2020 in response to the COVID-19 pandemic. Hundreds of PFLAG's local chapters moved their in-person support meetings to virtual meetings. PFLAG National also launched PFLAG Connects: Communities which are national support group meetings for a variety of BIPOC communities.

The PFLAG NYC chapter supports Asian American communities via programs such as its AAPI Rainbow Parents Circle.

== Campaigns ==
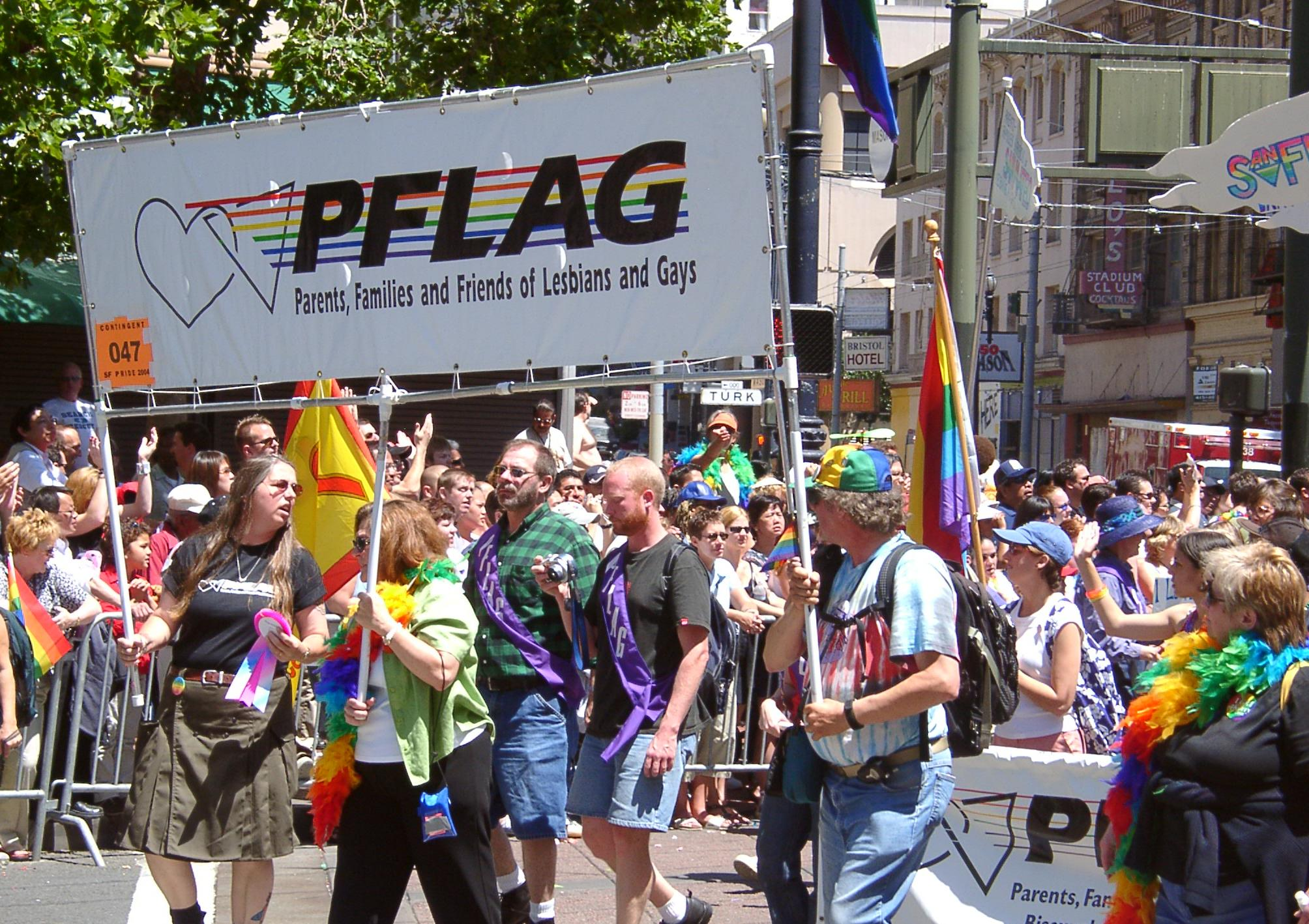
PFLAG contingent at San Francisco Pride, 2004

In the mid-1990s, "Project Open Mind" caused some controversy from Pat Robertson. He threatened to sue PFLAG and any television station that aired the project's ads, which showed clips of anti-LGBTQ quotes from several people, including Robertson, Jerry Falwell, and United States Senator Jesse Helms. The ads can currently be seen on the Commercial Closet webpage.

== Advocacy work ==
PFLAG National and the PFLAG chapter network engages in advocacy at the local, state and federal level and has issued public policy statements on a wide variety of issues. In the early 1990s, PFLAG chapters in Massachusetts helped pass the first Safe Schools legislation in the country. By the mid-1990s a PFLAG family was responsible for the Department of Education's ruling that Title IX protects gay and lesbian students from harassment based on sexual orientation. When Pat Robertson threatened to sue any station that carried Project Open Mind advertisements, the resulting media coverage drew national attention to PFLAG's message linking hate speech with hate crimes and LGBTQ teen suicide. PFLAG National campaigned to repeal "don't ask, don't tell" and in the fight for marriage equality in the United States—including filing an amicus brief with the United States Supreme Court. It continues working to end the practice of conversion therapy, to combat laws that permit discrimination under the guise of religious freedom such as the Religious Freedom Restoration Act, and more.

== List of presidents ==
Years of service	Name
1981–1987	Adele Starr
1987–1988	Elinor Lewellen
1988–1992	Paulette Goodman
1992–1996	Mitzi Henderson
1996–1998	Nancy N. McDonald
1998–2000	Paul Beeman
2000–2002	Arnold Drake
2002–2006	Sam Thoron
2006–2010	John R. Cepek
2010–2014	Rabbi David M. Horowitz
2014–2018	Jean Hodges
2018–2022	Kathy Godwin
2022–2024	Susan Thronson
2024–present	Edith Guffey

== Outside the United States ==
Similarly purposed (and sometimes similarly named) organizations have been established outside the United States since PFLAG's 1973 establishment, although the majority of such organizations are unaffiliated with each other or with the PFLAG National in the U.S. (the founding organization). Inspired by PFLAG, one of the first group gathered 1974 in Switzerland (Elternkontakstelle, active from 1974 to 1984, a forerunner of fels). Most recently, a PFLAG organization in People's Republic of China, PFLAG China, was established in June 2008 by Wu Youjian in Guangzhou after she accepted her son's homosexuality.

=== Other organizations ===
- AGedO (Italy)
- Association of Fathers and Mothers of Gays and Lesbians (Spain)
- Collectif des Familles d'Enfants Homosexuels (Cameroun)
- BEFAH (Germany)
- Chapter Four Uganda
- CONTACT (France)
- Elternkontaktstelle (1974-1985, loose coalition surrounding Irma Krieg-Morath)
- Families and Friends of Lesbians and Gays (United Kingdom)
- Families for Sexual Diversity (Latin America)
- FELS (Switzerland)
- PFLAG Canada (Separately originated, similarly named)
- PFLAG (Vietnam)
- PFLAG China (People's Republic of China)
- PFLAG Australia
- PFLAG South Africa
- PFLAG Myanmar/Burma
- Stolta föräldrar (Sweden)
- Tehila (Israel)
- Tels Quels (Belgium)
