= Gay Activists Alliance =

U.S. gay rights organization (1969–1981)

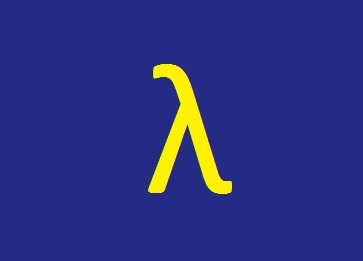
- Lower-case lambda designed by Tom Doerr, symbol of the Gay Activist Alliance
- Abbreviation: GAA
- Formation: December 21, 1969; 56 years ago
- Founder: Lee Deacon
- Purpose: LGBT rights
- Headquarters: New York City, US

The Gay Activists Alliance (GAA) was founded in New York City on December 21, 1969, almost six months after the Stonewall riots, by dissident members of the Gay Liberation Front (GLF). In contrast to the Liberation Front, the Activists Alliance solely and specifically served to gay and lesbian rights, declared themself politically neutral and wanted to work within the political system.

== History ==
The group was incorporated by Hal Weiner, Esq., of Coles & Weiner, a two-person firm, after Weiner defended Sylvia Rivera in a criminal court proceeding where she had been arrested in Times Square while obtaining signatures on a petition for the first proposed LGBTQ legislation in the New York City Council, Intro 475, and charged with soliciting for the purpose of sex, rather than exercising a civil right to petition. The corporate certificate was rejected by the New York State Division of Corporations and State Records, on the grounds that the name was not a fit name for a New York corporation because of the connotation in which the word "gay" was being used, and that the corporation was being formed to violate the sodomy laws of New York. It took five years to win the right to incorporate under that name.

The founding members, seven men and one woman, of the Gay Activists Alliance were dissatisfied members of the Gay Liberation Front. Some of the founding members included Fred Orlansky, Arthur Bell, Arthur Evans, Marty Robinson, Tom Doerr, Peter Marleau, Kay Tobin Lahusen, and Fred Cabellero. The group members wanted to form a "single issue, politically neutral [organization]", whose goal would be to "secure basic human rights, dignity and freedom for all gay people". The political neutrality and single-themedness stood in contrast to the Gay Liberation Front, which allied itself with the radical Black Panther Party, criticized the Vietnam War and had a hard left-wing, anti-capitalistic stance. GAA was most active from 1970 to 1974.

In one action in March 1970, the GAA organized protests against the police raid on the Snake Pit bar in Greenwich Village and the injuries suffered by Diego Viñales in the resulting chaos. These protests helped spark interest in the upcoming Christopher Street Liberation Day events already planned for 28 June. This event, scheduled to commemorate the first anniversary of the Stonewall riots, was the first Pride march celebration in the United States.

In 1973, the GAA challenged television host Jack Paar over remarks it regarded as derogatory toward gay people. After GAA president Bruce Voeller complained to Paar and ABC about his use of anti-gay stereotypes and terminology, Paar contacted the organization and invited representatives to appear on Jack Paar Tonite. Voeller, Arnie Kantrowitz, and Nathalie Rockhill appeared on the March 8 broadcast. The discussion became contentious as Paar defended some of his language, objected to gay people who “proselytize”, and questioned objections to the word “fairy”, while Kantrowitz explained why such terminology was offensive and reinforced stereotypes.

In 1973 three GAA members, Tom Wilson Weinberg, Dan Sherbo and Bern Boyle, opened the gay bookstore Giovanni's Room at 232 South Street. It was named after James Baldwin's gay novel Giovanni's Room. The store was closed shortly afterward due to a homophobic landlord. The store changed hands to lesbian activist Pat Hill in 1974 and then to Ed Hermance and Arleen Oshan in 1976. Hermance and Olshan moved the store first to 1426 Spruce Street and then to its final location on 12th and Pine in 1979. It has been called the "center of gay Philly". Philly AIDS Thrift took over the store after the owner retired in 2014 and so the store is now called Philly AIDS Thrift at Giovanni's Room, also known as PAT @ Giovanni's Room.

The GAA published the Gay Activist newspaper until 1980. GAA first met at the Church of the Holy Apostles (9th Ave. & 28th St.). Their next New York City headquarters, the Firehouse at 99 Wooster Street in Soho, was occupied in May 1971 and burned down by arsonists on October 15, 1974. "By 1980 GAA had begun to sound like the Gay Liberation Front in 1969. After Activists met to officially disband the Alliance a year later..."

GAA members performed zaps (first conceived by Marty Robinson), raucous public demonstrations designed to embarrass a public figure or celebrity while calling the attention of both gays and straights to issues of LGBT rights. Some of their more visible actions included protests against an anti-gay episode on the popular TV series Marcus Welby, M.D., many zaps of Mayor John Lindsay at the Metropolitan Museum of Art and later at Radio City Music Hall, a zap against Governor Nelson Rockefeller (the "Rockefeller 5"), a zap at the Marriage License Bureau demanding marriage rights for gays, a zap against Fidelifacts, which provided anti-gay information to employers, a zap at the NYC Taxi Commission (which required gay cab drivers to get an OK from a psychiatrist before being employed), and a zap at the New York Daily News, which printed a scurrilous editorial attacking "queers, lezzies, pansies, call them what you will." Four were arrested. Although, GAA was nominally non-violent, zaps could sometimes involve physical altercations and vandalism. GAA co-founder Morty Manford got into scuffles with security and administration during his successful effort to found the student club Gay People at Columbia University in 1971, as well as at a famous protest against homophobia at the elite Inner Circle event in 1972. GAA was associated with a series of combative zaps against homophobic politicians and anti-gay activists in the summer of 1977. Although Time magazine derided them as "Gay goons", the actions succeeded in keeping the conservative backlash of the late-1970s out of New York state.

The GAA Firehouse on Wooster Street also served as a community center and had extremely popular dances that helped fund the organization. The stairwell was decorated with a photomontage agitprop mural created by the British artist Mario Dubsky (1939–85) and the American painter John Button (1929–82) both of whom were early victims of AIDS. The Mural was destroyed in the fire that destroyed the centre in 1974. The symbol of the Gay Activists Alliance was the lower case Greek letter lambda (λ).

== Gay Activist Alliance Committees ==
The Gay Activist Alliance formed multiple sub-committees that allowed the organization to intensely focus on multiple gay and lesbians issue at one time. The committees were named after the issue they were devoted to. The following list of several different sub-committees illustrate the wide-ranging topics the subcommittees covered: Political projects, police power, municipal fair employment law, fair tax, municipal government committee, state government, legal committee, news, leaflets and graphics, fundraising, social affairs, orientations, speakers bureau and agitprop committee.

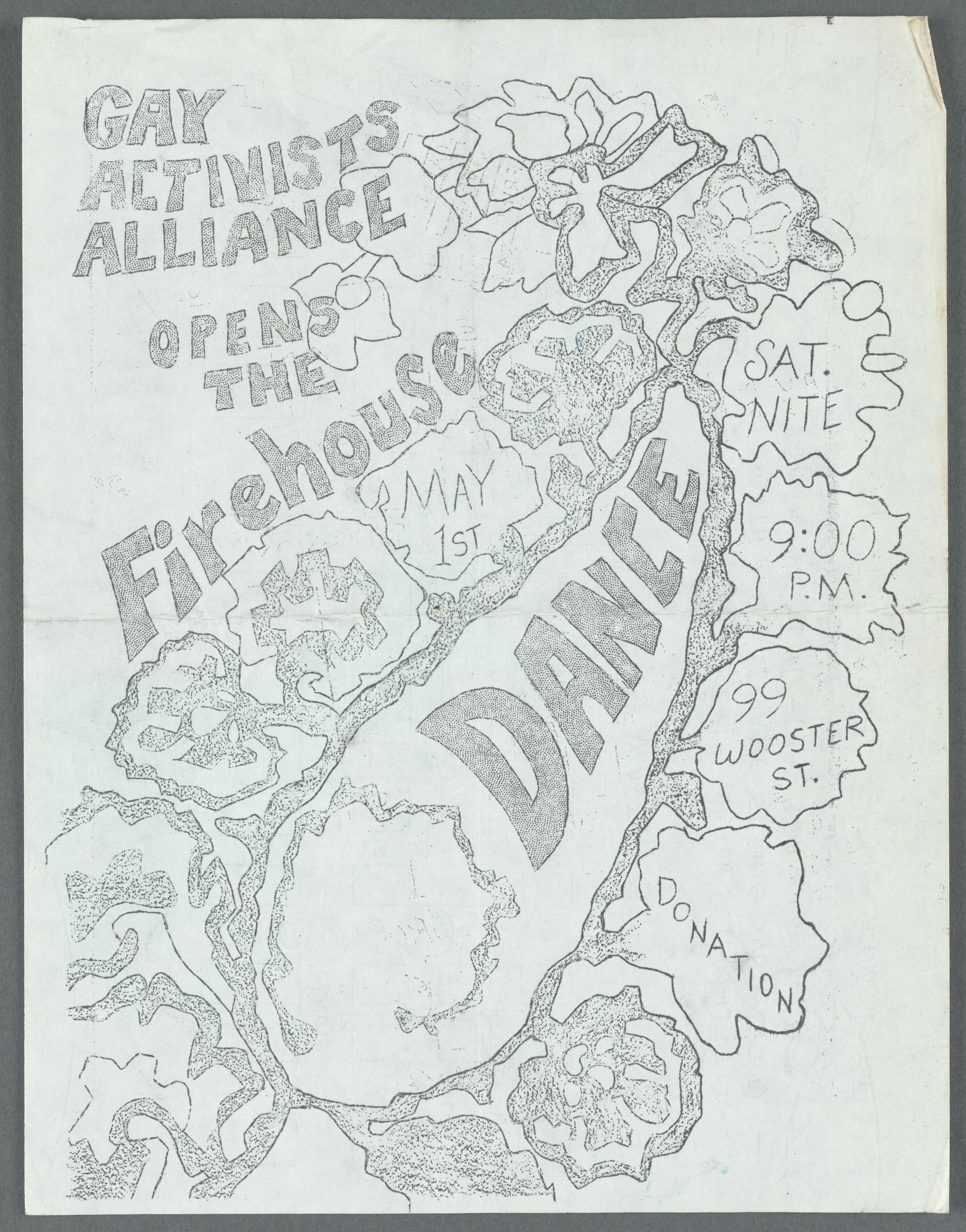
Flier from the Gay Activist Alliance advertising their Saturday night dances at the Firehouse, which were both social and fundraising events.

=== Firehouse Committee ===
This committee was dedicated to the upkeep of the Firehouse, which became its headquarters in 1971. The Firehouse Committee was in charge of organizing its iconic dances that aided in "fostering Gay solidarity and understanding through social contact among all members of good will in the gay community." On the LGBTQ&A podcast, Charles Silverstein said, "It was paid for through our Saturday night dances where people paid us $2.00 to come to the dance, and all the soda or beer that you want for the night. Through that, they paid the rent. It's not like there was a lot of fancy furniture in there...I mean, the furniture were the rejects from the street." Silverstein says GAA meetings drew 200-300 people and the dances drew "easily 1,000".

=== Lesbian Liberation Committee ===
While the majority demographic of the Gay Activist Alliance were men, this sub-committee was important because it was devoted to planning events in order "to support a sense of community among all lesbians."

=== Municipal Fair Employment Law ===
This sub-committee was dedicated to outlawing homosexual job discrimination in both the public and private sector. The purpose of this committee was "to recommend strategy to GAA for demonstrations and lobbying in order to effect passage in the City Council."

=== Police Power ===
Similar to the Municipal Fair Employment Law sub-committee, this sub-committee recommended strategies to the rest of the GAA for resisting oppression and discrimination against the gays and lesbian committee.

=== Political Projects ===
This committee oversaw all other political sub-committees in the GAA, because this sub-committee's purpose was to recommend the formation of new sub-committees, and also changes in mandates to pre-existing political sub-committees.

=== Social Affairs ===
This sub-committee was in charge of organizing and hosting various social events in order to unite the gay and lesbian community. More importantly, it helped raise money for the GAA from admission fees to the social events.

=== Youth Information Service ===
This sub-committee is just one example of the Gay Activist Alliance's commitment to gay and lesbian youth. The Youth Information Service was dedicated to offering representatives of the GAA to speak "on the topic of Gay Liberation for youthful or youth-orientated groups or organizations especially including high schools and colleges."

== See also ==
- List of LGBT rights organizations
- Gay liberation
- Gay Liberation Front
